= List of ZX Spectrum games =

This is a list of video games for the ZX Spectrum home computer. There are currently 1893 games on this list.

Title	Publisher	Licensed from	Release date	Reference
10th Frame	U.S. Gold	Access Software	1987	^{[a]}
180	Mastertronic Added Dimension		1986	^{[a]}
19 Part One: Boot Camp	Cascade Games		1988	^{[a]}
1942	Elite Systems	Capcom	1986	^{[a]}
1943: The Battle of Midway	Go!	Capcom	1988	^{[a]}
1999	Summit Software		1987	
1st Division Manager	Codemasters		1991	
2 Player Soccer Squard	Cult Games		1991	^{[a]}
2088	Zeppelin Games		1988	^{[a]}
3-D Monster Chase	Romik Software		1984	
3D Construction Kit	Domark		1991	^{[a]}
3D Grand Prix	Zeppelin Games		1991	
3D Pool	Firebird Software	Maltese Joe Barbara	1989	^{[a]}
3D Seiddab Attack	Hewson Consultants		1984	^{[a]}
3D Snooker	Players Premier Software		1990	
3D Space Wars	Hewson Consultants		1983	
3D Starfighter	Codemasters		1988	^{[a]}
3D Stock Car Championship	Firebird Software		1988	^{[a]}
3D Stock Cars II	Challenge Software		1992	^{[a]}
3D Tank Duel	Realtime Games Software		1984	
3D Tanx	DK'Tronics		1982	^{[zx]}
3D Tunnel	New Generation Software		1983	^{[zx]}
3DC	Hit-Pak		1987	
4 Soccer Simulators	Codemasters		1988	
4x4 Off-Road Racing	U.S. Gold	Epyx	1988	^{[a]}
720°	U.S. Gold	Atari Games	1987	^{[a]}
750cc Grand Prix	Codemasters		1991	
A Question of Sport	Elite Systems	BBC	1989	^{[a]}
A View to a Kill	Domark	United Artists/Eon Productions	1985	^{[a]}
A Day in the Life	Micromega		1985	^{[a]}
A.M.C.: Astro Marine Corps	Dinamic Software		1989	^{[a]}
Aaargh!	Melbourne House		1989	^{[a]}
Abracadabra	Proein Soft Line		1988	
Abyss	Cases Computer Simulations		1984	
Academy	CRL Group		1987	^{[a]}
Ace	Cascade Games		1986	^{[a]}
Ace 2	Cascade Games		1987	^{[a]}
ACE 2088	Cascade Games		1989	
Ace of Aces	U.S. Gold	Artech Digital Entertainment	1986	^{[a]}
Acrojet	U.S. Gold		1986	^{[a]}
Action Biker	Mastertronic	KP Skips	1985	^{[a]}
Action Fighter	Firebird Software	Sega	1989	^{[a]}
Action Force	Virgin Games		1987	^{[a]}
Action Force II	Virgin Games	Milton Bradley Company	1988	^{[a]}
Adidas Championship Football	Ocean Software	Adidas	1990	^{[a]}
Adidas Championship Tie-Break	Ocean Software	Adidas	1990	^{[a]}
Advanced Dungeons & Dragons: Heroes of the Lance	U.S. Gold	SSI	1988	
Advanced Lawnmower Simulator	Your Sinclair		1988	^{[a]}
Advanced Pinball Simulator	Codemasters		1988	^{[a]}
Advanced Soccer Simulator	Mastertronic Plus		1989	
Adventure 1	Abersoft		1982	
Adventure A: Planet of Death	Artic Computing		1982	^{[zx]}
Adventureland	Adventure International		1985	
After Burner	Activision	Sega	1988	^{[a]}
After the War	Dinamic Software		1989	^{[a]}
Aftermath	Alternative Software		1988	
Agent Orange	A&F Software		1987	^{[a]}
Agent X	Mastertronic		1986	^{[a]}
Agent X II: The Mad Prof's Back	Mastertronic		1987	^{[a]}
Ah Diddums	Imagine Software		1983	^{[zx]}
Airborne Ranger	MicroProse		1988	^{[a]}
Airwolf	Elite Systems		1985	^{[a]}
Alchemist	Imagine Software		1983	^{[a]}
Alien	Mind Games	20th Century Fox	1984	^{[a]}
Alien 8	Ultimate Play the Game		1985	^{[a]}
Alien Highway	Vortex Software		1986	^{[a]}
Alien Storm	U.S. Gold	Sega	1991	^{[a]}
Alien Swarm	Titan Programs		1982	^{[zx]}
Alien Syndrome	ACE Software	Sega	1988	^{[a]}
Aliens: The Computer Game	Electric Dreams Software	20th Century Fox	1986	^{[a]}
Aliens	Electric Dreams Software	20th Century Fox	1986	^{[a]}
All-American Basketball	Zeppelin Games		1992	^{[a]}
All or Nothing	Abbex Electronics		1984	^{[a]}
Alpine Games	Atlantis Software		1987	
Altered Beast	Activision	Sega	1989	^{[a]}
Alternative World Games	Gremlin Graphics		1987	^{[a]}
Amaurote	Mastertronic Added Dimension		1987	^{[a]}
Amazônia	JVA Microcomputadores Ltda		1985	
American 3D Pool	Zeppelin Games		1992	^{[a]}
American Tag-Team Wrestling	Zeppelin Games		1992	^{[a]}
Android Two	Vortex Software		1983	
Andy Capp: The Game	Mirrorsoft	Mirror Group Newspapers	1988	^{[a]}
Angel Nieto Pole 500	Opera Soft	Ángel Nieto	1990	
Angler	Virgin Games		1983	
Annals of Rome	Personal Software Services		1986	
Ant Attack	Quicksilva		1983	^{[a]}
APB	Domark	Tengen/Atari	1989	
Apocalypse: The Game of Nuclear Devastation	Red Shift	Games Workshop	1983	^{[a]}
Aquaplane	Quicksilva		1983	^{[zx]}
Aquasquad	Atlantis Software		1988	^{[a]}
Arcade Flight Simulator	Codemasters		1989	^{[a]}
Arcade Fruit Machine	Zeppelin Games		1990	^{[a]}
Arcade Trivia Quiz	Zeppelin Games		1989	^{[a]}
Arcadia	Imagine Software		1982	^{[zx]}
Archon II: Adept	Electronic Arts	Free Fall Associates	1989	
Archon: The Light and the Dark	Ariolasoft	Electronic Arts	1985	^{[a]}
Archon: The Light and the Dark	Electronic Arts	Free Fall Associates	1989	^{[a]}
Arcticfox	Electronic Arts		1988	^{[a]}
Arkanoid	Imagine Software	Taito	1987	^{[a]}
Arkanoid: Revenge of Doh	Imagine Software	Taito	1988	^{[a]}
Arkos	Zigurat		1988	
Armageddon	Ocean Software		1983	
Army Moves	Dinamic Software		1986	^{[a]}
Arnhem	Cases Computer Simulations		1985	^{[a]}
Arquimedes XXI	Dinamic Software		1987	
Artura	Gremlin Graphics		1989	^{[a]}
Ashkeron!	Mirrorsoft		1985	
Aspar GP Master	Dinamic Software	Jorge Martínez	1988	
Assault Course	Players Premier Software		1990	
Asterix and the Magic Cauldron	Melbourne House	René Goscinny & Albert Uderzo	1986	^{[a]}
Astroball	Digital Reality		1992	
ATF	Digital Integration		1988	
Athena	Imagine Software	SNK	1987	^{[a]}
Atic Atac	Ultimate Play the Game		1983	
Atom Ant	Hi-Tec Software	Hanna-Barbera	1990	^{[a]}
Attack of the Killer Tomatoes	Global Software	NAI Entertainment	1986	^{[a]}
ATV Simulator	Codemasters		1987	
Auf Wiedersehen Monty	Gremlin Graphics		1987	^{[a]}
Austerlitz 1805	Cases Computer Simulations		1989	^{[a]}
Australian Games	U.S. Gold		1990	
Australian Rules Football	Again Again		1989	
Autocrash	Zigurat		1991	
Automonopoli (a.k.a. Go to Jail)	Automata UK		1983	^{[zx]}
Avalanche: The Struggle for Italy	Cases Computer Simulations		1991	
Avalon	Hewson Consultants		1984	
B.C. Bill	Imagine Software		1984	^{[a]}
B.C.'s Quest for Tires	Software Projects	Sierra On-Line	1983	
Back to Skool	Microsphere		1985	^{[a]}
Back to the Future	Electric Dreams Software	Amblin Entertainment	1985	^{[a]}
Back to the Future Part II	Image Works	Amblin Entertainment	1990	^{[a]}
Back to the Future Part III	Image Works	Amblin Entertainment	1991	^{[a]}
Backpackers Guide to the Universe	Fantasy Software		1984	
Badlands	Domark	Atari/Tengen	1990	^{[a]}
Ballblazer	Activision	Lucasfilm Games	1986	^{[a]}
Ballbreaker II	CRL Group		1988	^{[a]}
Banger Racer	Cult Games		1990	^{[a]}
Bangers & Mash	Alternative Software	FilmFair/CITV	1992	^{[a]}
Barbarian	Melbourne House	Psygnosis	1988	^{[a]}
Barbarian II: The Dungeon of Drax	Palace Software		1988	^{[a]}
Barbarian: The Ultimate Warrior	Palace Software		1986	^{[a]}
Barmy Burgers	Blaby Computer Games		1983	
Barry McGuigan World Championship Boxing	Gamestar	Barry McGuigan	1985	
Basil the Great Mouse Detective	Gremlin Graphics	The Walt Disney Company	1987	^{[a]}
Batman	Ocean Software	DC Comics	1986	^{[a]}
Batman: The Movie	Ocean Software	Warner Bros.	1989	^{[a]}
Batman: The Caped Crusader	Ocean Software	DC Comics	1988	^{[a]}
Battle 1917	Cases Computer Simulations		1983	
Battle Command	Ocean Software		1990	^{[a]}
Battle for Midway	Personal Software Services		1985	^{[a]}
Battle of Britain	Personal Software Services		1986	^{[a]}
Battle of the Planets	Mikro-Gen		1986	^{[a]}
Battle of the Toothpaste Tubes	K-Tel Productions		1983	
Battle Ships	Encore		1988	^{[a]}
Battle Valley	Rack-It		1988	
Battle-Field	Atlantis Software		1988	
Battlecars	Games Workshop/Summit Software		1984	
Battlefield Germany	Personal Software Services		1987	^{[a]}
Battleships	Elite Systems		1987	^{[a]}
Battlezone	Quicksilva	Atari	1984	
Batty	Hit-Pak		1987	^{[a]}
Bazooka Bill	Melbourne House		1986	^{[a]}
Beach Buggy Simulator	Silverbird Software		1988	^{[a]}
Beach Head II: The Dictator Strikes Back	U.S. Gold	Access Software	1985	^{[a]}
Beach Volley	Ocean Software	Warner Bros.	1989	
Beach-Head	U.S. Gold	Access Software	1984	^{[a]}
Beaky and the Egg Snatchers	Fantasy Software		1984	^{[a]}
Beamrider	Activision		1984	^{[a]}
Bear Bovver	Artic Computing		1983	^{[a]}
Beatle Quest	Number 9 Software	ATV Music	1985	^{[a]}
Bedlam	Go!		1988	^{[a]}
Belegost	Golden Triangle		1989	
Benny Hill's Madcap Chase	DK'Tronics	Thames Television	1985	^{[a]}
Bestial Warrior	Dinamic Software		1989	
Beverly Hills Cop	Tynesoft	Paramount Pictures	1990	^{[a]}
Beyond the Ice Palace	Elite Systems		1988	^{[a]}
Biff	Beyond Belief		1992	^{[a]}
Big Nose's American Adventure	Codemasters		1992	^{[a]}
Big Trouble in Little China	Electric Dreams Software	20th Century Fox	1986	^{[a]}
Bigfoot	Codemasters		1988	^{[a]}
Bionic Commando	Go!	Capcom	1988	^{[a]}
Bionic Ninja	Zeppelin Games		1989	
Bismarck	Personal Software Services		1987	^{[a]}
Black Beard	Topo Soft		1988	
Black Crystal	Carnell Software		1982	^{[zx]}
Black Lamp	Firebird Software		1988	^{[a]}
Black Magic	U.S. Gold	Datasoft	1987	
Black Tiger	Go!	Capcom	1989	^{[a]}
Blade Runner	CRL Group	Warner Bros. Pictures	1985	^{[a]}
Blade the Warrior	Cable Software		1984	
Blade Warrior	Codemasters		1988	^{[a]}
Blasteroids	Image Works	Atari Games	1989	^{[a]}
Blazing Thunder	Hi-Tec Software		1990	^{[a]}
Blinky's Scary School	Zeppelin Games		1990	^{[a]}
Blitzkrieg	Cases Computer Simulations		1988	^{[a]}
Blobbo	Continental Software		1983	
Blood Brothers	Gremlin Graphics		1988	^{[a]}
Bloody Paws	G.LL. Software		1990	
Bloodwych	Image Works		1990	^{[a]}
Blue Max	U.S. Gold	Synapse Software	1984	^{[a]}
BMX Freestyle Simulator	Codemasters		1989	^{[a]}
BMX Kidz	Firebird Software		1988	^{[a]}
BMX Ninja	Alternative Software		1988	
BMX Simulator	Codemasters		1987	^{[a]}
BMX Simulator 2	Codemasters		1989	^{[a]}
Bob's Full House	TV Games	BBC	1988	^{[a]}
Bobby Bearing	Edge Software		1986	^{[a]}
Bomb Jack	Elite Systems	Tehkan	1986	^{[a]}
Bomberman	Hudson Soft		1983	
Bombfusion	Mastertronic		1989	
Bonanza Bros.	U.S. Gold	Sega	1992	^{[a]}
Booty	Firebird Software		1984	^{[a]}
Bored of the Rings	Delta 4		1985	
Bosconian '87	Mastertronic		1987	^{[a]}
Boulder Dash	Front Runner	First Star Software	1984	^{[a]}
Boulder Dash Construction Kit	Databyte	First Star Software	1988	^{[a]}
Boulder Dash II	First Star Software		1985	^{[a]}
Boulder Dash III	American Action AB		1986	
Bounces	Beyond Software		1985	^{[a]}
Bounder	Gremlin Graphics		1987	^{[a]}
Bounty Bob Strikes Back!	U.S. Gold		1985	^{[a]}
Boxing Manager 2	D&H Games		1988	
Brad Blasts the Galactic Barbarians	Express Software		1983	
Brainache	Codemasters		1987	^{[a]}
BraveStarr	U.S. Gold	Group W. Productions	1987	^{[a]}
BreakThru!	U.S. Gold	Data East	1986	^{[a]}
Brian Bloodaxe	Edge Software		1985	^{[a]}
Brian Clough's Football Fortunes	CDS Micro Systems	Brian Clough	1987	^{[a]}
Brian Jacks Superstar Challenge	Martech		1985	^{[a]}
Bride of Frankenstein	39 Steps		1987	
Bristles	State Soft		1984	^{[a]}
British Super League	Cult Games		1989	
Bruce Lee	U.S. Gold	Datasoft	1984	^{[a]}
Bubble Bobble	Firebird Software	Taito	1987	^{[a]}
Bubble Dizzy	Codemasters		1991	^{[a]}
Bubbler	Ultimate Play the Game		1987	^{[a]}
Buck Rogers: Planet of Zoom	U.S. Gold	Sega	1985	^{[a]}
Budokan: The Martial Spirit	Dro Soft	Electronic Arts	1991	
Buffalo Bill's Wild West Show	Tynesoft		1989	
Bugaboo (The Flea)	Quicksilva		1983	^{[a]}
Buggy Boy	Elite Systems	Tatsumi	1988	^{[a]}
Buggy Ranger	Dinamic Software		1990	
Bugsy	CRL Group		1986	^{[a]}
Bully's Sporting Darts	Alternative Software	Central Television/Chatsworth Television	1993	^{[a]}
Bumpy	Loriciels		1989	
Butch – Hard Guy	Advance Software		1987	^{[a]}
Butcher Hill	Gremlin Graphics		1989	^{[a]}
By Fair Means or Foul	Superior Software		1989	^{[a]}
Cabal	Ocean Software	TAD Corporation	1989	^{[a]}
California Games	U.S. Gold	Epyx	1987	^{[a]}
Camelot Warriors	Dinamic Software		1985	^{[a]}
Canyon Warrior	Mastertronic Plus		1989	^{[a]}
Capitán Sevilla	Dinamic Software		1988	
Capitan Trueno	Dinamic Software	Víctor Mora	1990	
Captain America in: The Doom Tube of Dr. Megalomann	Go!	Marvel Comics	1988	^{[a]}
Captain Blood	Exxos		1988	^{[a]}
Captain Dynamo	Codemasters		1992	^{[a]}
Captain Fizz	Psyclapse		1989	^{[a]}
Captain Planet and the Planeteers	Mindscape		1991	^{[a]}
Carlos Sainz: Campeonato del Mundo de Rallies	Zigurat	Carlos Sainz	1990	
Carrier Command	Rainbird Software		1989	^{[a]}
Cassette 50	Cascade Games		1983	
Castle Master	Incentive Software		1990	^{[a]}
Castle of Terror	Melbourne House		1984	
Cauldron	Palace Software		1985	^{[a]}
Cauldron II: The Pumpkin Strikes Back	Palace Software		1986	^{[a]}
Cavemania	Atlantis Software		1990	^{[a]}
Cavern Fighter	Bug-Byte		1983	^{[a]}
Centipod	Challenge Software		1990	
Cerius	Atlantis Software		1988	^{[a]}
Championship 3D Snooker	Zeppelin Games		1992	^{[a]}
Championship Baseball	Gamestar	Activision	1987	^{[a]}
Championship Golf	D&H Games		1988	^{[a]}
Championship Jet Ski Simulator	Codemasters		1989	
Championship Run	Impulze		1991	^{[a]}
Championship Sprint	Electric Dreams Software	Atari Games	1988	^{[a]}
Chaos: The Battle of Wizards	Games Workshop		1985	^{[a]}
Charlie and the Chocolate Factory	Hill MacGibbon	Roald Dahl	1985	^{[a]}
Chase H.Q.	Ocean Software	Taito	1989	^{[a]}
Chase HQ II: Special Criminal Investigation	Ocean Software	Taito	1990	^{[a]}
Chequered Flag	Sinclair Research		1983	^{[a]}
Chevy Chase	Hi-Tec Software		1991	
Chicago's 30	Topo Soft		1988	^{[a]}
Chimera	Firebird Software		1985	^{[a]}
Chip's Challenge	U.S. Gold	Epyx	1990	^{[a]}
Cholo	Firebird Software		1987	
Chronos: A Tapestry of Time	Mastertronic		1987	^{[a]}
Chubby Gristle	Grandslam Entertainment		1988	^{[a]}
Chuck Yeager's Advanced Flight Trainer	Electronic Arts	Chuck Yeager	1989	^{[a]}
Chuckie Egg	A&F Software		1984	
Chuckie Egg 2	A&F Software		1985	^{[a]}
Circus Games	Tynesoft		1988	^{[a]}
Cisco Heat	Image Works	Jaleco	1991	^{[a]}
CJ in the USA	Codemasters		1991	
CJ's Elephant Antics	Codemasters		1991	
Classic Axiens	Bubble Bus Software		1988	
Classic Muncher	Bubble Bus Software		1987	
Clever & Smart	Magic Bytes		1988	^{[a]}
Cobra	Ocean Software	Warner Brothers	1986	^{[a]}
Cobra Force	Players Premier Software		1989	
Cobra's Arc	Dinamic Software		1986	
Codename MAT	Micromega		1984	
Codename MAT II	Domark		1984	^{[a]}
Colin the Cleaner	IJK Software		1987	
Coliseum	Topo Soft		1988	
Collision Course	Americana Software		1987	
Colony	Bulldog		1987	^{[a]}
Colossus 4 Chess	CDS Micro Systems		1986	^{[a]}
Colossus Bridge 4	CDS Software		1986	^{[a]}
Colour Clash	Romik Software		1983	
Comando Tracer	Dinamic Software		1989	
Combat Lynx	Durell Software		1984	^{[a]}
Combat School	Ocean Software	Konami	1987	^{[a]}
Combat Zone	Alternative Software		1988	
Commando	Elite Systems	Capcom	1985	^{[a]}
Confuzion	Incentive Software		1985	^{[a]}
Contact Sam Cruise	Microsphere		1986	^{[a]}
Continental Circus	Virgin Mastertronic	Taito	1989	^{[a]}
Cookie	Ultimate Play the Game		1983	
Corridors of Genon	New Generation Software		1983	^{[zx]}
Corruption	Rainbird Software		1988	
Corsarios	Opera Soft		1989	
Cosmic Cruiser	Imagine Software		1984	
Cosmic Debris	Artic Computing		1983	^{[zx]}
Cosmic Guerilla	Crystal Computing		1983	^{[zx]}
Cosmic Pirate	Byte Back		1989	^{[a]}
Cosmic Sheriff	Dinamic Software		1990	
Cosmic Wartoad	Ocean Software		1985	^{[a]}
Cosmo Police Galivan	Nichibutsu		1985	^{[a]}
Count Duckula	Alternative Software	Cosgrove Hall Productions	1989	^{[a]}
Count Duckula 2	Alternative Software	Cosgrove Hall	1992	^{[a]}
Countdown to Doom	Topologika	Acornsoft	1988	
County Cricket	D&H Games		1989	
Cowboy Kidz	Byte Back		1989	
Crack Down	U.S. Gold	Sega	1990	^{[a]}
Crack-Up	Atlantis Software		1989	
Crazy Cars	Titus Software		1988	^{[a]}
Crazy Cars II	Titus Software		1988	^{[a]}
Crete 1941	Cases Computer Simulations		1991	^{[a]}
Cricket Captain	D&H Games		1988	^{[a]}
Cricket Captain	Hi-Tec Software		1990	
Crime Busters	Players Software		1988	^{[a]}
Critical Mass	Durell Software		1985	^{[a]}
Cromwell at War 1642-1645	Cases Computer Simulations		1991	^{[a]}
Crossfire	Atlantis Software		1989	
Crosswize	Firebird Software		1988	^{[a]}
Crusader	SPE		1988	
Crux 92	Ultrasoft		1992	
Crystal Castles	U.S. Gold	Atari	1986	^{[a]}
Crystal Kingdom Dizzy	Codemasters		1992	^{[a]}
Cup Football	Cult Games		1988	
Curro Jimenez	Zigurat	Televisión Española	1989	
Curse of the Seven Faces	Classic Computing		1984	
Cyber Police ESWAT	U.S. Gold	Sega	1990	^{[a]}
Cyberball	Domark	Atari/Tengen	1990	^{[a]}
Cyberknights	CRL Group		1988	^{[a]}
Cybernoid	Hewson Consultants		1988	^{[a]}
Cybernoid II: The Revenge	Hewson Consultants		1988	^{[a]}
Cyberun	Ultimate Play the Game		1986	^{[a]}
Cyclone	Vortex Software		1985	^{[a]}
D.N.A. Warrior	Cascade Games		1989	^{[a]}
Dalek Attack	Alternative Software	BBC Enterprises	1992	^{[a]}
Daley Thompson's Decathlon	Ocean Software	Daley Thompson	1984	^{[a]}
Daley Thompson's Olympic Challenge	Ocean Software	Daley Thompson/Adidas/Lucozade	1988	^{[a]}
Daley Thompson's Supertest	Ocean Software	Daley Thompson	1986	^{[a]}
Dan Dare II: Mekon's Revenge	Virgin Games	Eagle	1988	^{[a]}
Dan Dare III: The Escape	Virgin Games	Eagle	1990	^{[a]}
Dan Dare: Pilot of the Future	Virgin Games	Eagle	1986	
Dandy	Electric Dreams Software		1986	^{[a]}
Danger Mouse in Double Trouble	Creative Sparks	Cosgrove Hall	1984	^{[a]}
Danger Mouse in Making Whoopee!	Creative Sparks	Cosgrove Hall	1985	^{[a]}
Danger Mouse in the Black Forest Chateau	Creative Sparks	Cosgrove Hall	1984	^{[a]}
Darius+	The Edge	Taito	1990	^{[a]}
Dark Fusion	Gremlin Graphics		1988	^{[a]}
Dark Sceptre	Firebird Software		1987	^{[a]}
Dark Side	Incentive Software		1988	^{[a]}
Dark Star	Design Design		1984	^{[a]}
Darkman	Ocean Software	Universal Pictures	1991	^{[a]}
Days of Thunder	Mindscape	Paramount Pictures	1990	^{[a]}
Deactivators	Reaktor		1986	^{[a]}
Dead or Alive	Alternative Software		1987	
Deadenders	Top Ten Software		1989	
Deadly Evil	Players Premier Software		1990	
Death Before Dishonour	Alternative Software		1987	
Death or Glory	CRL Group		1987	^{[a]}
Death Stalker	Codemasters		1989	^{[a]}
Death Wish 3	Gremlin Graphics	Cannon Group	1987	^{[a]}
Deathchase	Micromega		1983	
Defender	Atari, Inc.		1981	
Defenders of the Earth	Enigma Variations	King Features Syndicate	1990	^{[a]}
Deflektor	Gremlin Graphics		1987	^{[a]}
Deliverance: Stormlord II	Hewson Consultants		1990	^{[a]}
Delta Charge	Thalamus		1990	^{[a]}
Demon's Revenge	Firebird Software		1988	^{[a]}
Denizen	Players Software		1988	^{[a]}
Desert Rats: The North Africa Campaign	Cases Computer Simulations		1985	
Desolator	U.S. Gold	Alpha Denshi/Sega	1988	^{[a]}
Destiny Mission	Williams Technology		1990	
Deus Ex Machina	Automata UK		1984	^{[a]}
Devastating Blow	Beyond Belief		1991	^{[a]}
Deviants	Players Software		1987	^{[a]}
Di-Lithium Lift	Hewson Consultants		1983	
Diamond	Destiny Software		1988	^{[a]}
Dick Tracy	Titus Software	Touchstone Pictures	1990	^{[a]}
Dictator	DK'Tronics		1983	^{[zx]}
Die Alien Slime	Mastertronic Plus		1989	
Dimension Destructors	Artic Computing		1983	
Dimension Omega	Positive		1989	
Dirk Track Racer	Zeppelin Games		1991	^{[a]}
Dizzy Down the Rapids	Codemasters		1991	^{[a]}
Dizzy Panic	Codemasters		1991	
Dizzy – The Ultimate Cartoon Adventure	Codemasters		1987	^{[a]}
Dizzy: Prince of the Yolkfolk	Codemasters		1991	^{[a]}
DJ Puff's Volcanic Caper	Codemasters		1992	^{[a]}
Do Not Pass Go	Work Force		1982	^{[zx]}
Doc the Destroyer	Melbourne House		1987	^{[a]}
Dominator	System 3		1989	
Don Quijote	Dinamic Software		1987	
Don't Buy This	Firebird Software		1985	
Donald's Alphabet Chase	Disney Software		1991	
Donkey Kong	Ocean Software	Nintendo	1986	^{[a]}
Doomdark's Revenge	Beyond Software		1985	^{[a]}
Doomsday Castle	Fantasy Software		1983	^{[a]}
Double Dare	Alternative Software	MTV/Viacom/BBC	1991	^{[a]}
Double Dragon	Melbourne House	Taito/American Technos	1989	^{[a]}
Double Dragon 3: The Rosetta Stone	Storm Software	American Technos	1991	^{[a]}
Double Dragon II: The Revenge	Virgin Mastertronic	American Technos	1989	^{[a]}
Downtown	Atlantis Software		1991	^{[a]}
Draconus	Zeppelin Games		1988	^{[a]}
Dracula	CRL Group		1986	^{[a]}
Dragon Breed	Activision	Irem	1990	^{[a]}
Dragon Spirit	Domark	Tengen/Namco	1989	^{[a]}
DragonNinja	Imagine Software	Data East	1988	^{[a]}
Dragonia	Astros Productions		1988	
Dragons of Flame	U.S. Gold	SSI/TSR	1990	^{[a]}
Dragontorc	Hewson Consultants		1985	^{[a]}
Dragon's Lair	Software Projects	Magicom/Cinematronics	1986	^{[a]}
Dream Warrior	U.S. Gold	Tarann	1988	^{[a]}
Driller	Incentive Software		1987	^{[a]}
Drive-In	Fantasy Software		1984	
Droidz	Silverbird Software		1988	
Drop a Brick	Sinclair Research Ltd		1982	
Druid	Firebird Software		1986	^{[a]}
Druids Moon	Alternative Software		1987	
Dun Darach	Gargoyle Games		1985	^{[a]}
Dusty Droid and the Garbage Gobblers	Pirate Software		1988	
Dyna Star	Pirate Software		1988	
Dynamic Duo	Firebird Software		1989	^{[a]}
Dynamite Dan	Mirrorsoft		1985	^{[a]}
Dynamite Dan II	Mirrorsoft		1985	^{[a]}
Dynamite Düx	Activision	Sega	1989	^{[a]}
Dynamix	Virgin Mastertronic		1989	
Dynasty Wars	U.S. Gold	Capcom	1990	
E-Motion	U.S. Gold		1990	^{[a]}
Earth Shaker	Your Sinclair		1990	
Earthlight	Firebird Software		1988	^{[a]}
Echelon	U.S. Gold	Access Software	1988	^{[a]}
Edd the Duck	Impulze	BBC	1990	^{[a]}
Eddie Kidd Jump Challenge	Martech	Eddie Kidd	1984	^{[a]}
Elevator Action	Quicksilva	Taito	1986	^{[a]}
Eliminator	Hewson Consultants		1988	^{[a]}
Elite	Firebird Software	Ian Bell, David Braben	1985	^{[a]}
Elven Warrior	Players Premier Software		1989	
Emerald Isle	Level 9		1984	^{[a]}
Emilio Butragueno Futbol	Topo Soft/Ocean Software		1988	
Emilio Sanchez Vicario Grand Slam	Zigurat	Emilio Sánchez	1990	
Emlyn Hughes Arcade Quiz	Audiogenic Software	Emlyn Hughes	1990	^{[a]}
Emlyn Hughes International Soccer	Audiogenic Software	Emlyn Hughes	1989	^{[a]}
Empire!	Firebird Software		1986	
Encyclopedia of War: Ancient Battles	Cases Computer Simulations		1989	
End Zone	Alternative Software		1987	
Enduro	Activision		1984	^{[a]}
Enduro Racer	Activision	Sega	1987	^{[a]}
Enigma Force	Beyond Software		1986	^{[a]}
Equinox	Mikro-Gen		1986	^{[a]}
Eric and the Floaters (1984 re-release of Bomberman)	Sinclair Research		1984	
Erik the Viking	Mosaic Publishing		1984	
Escape	New Generation Software		1982	^{[zx]}
Dragon's Lair II: Escape from Singe's Castle	Software Projects	Magicom/Cinematronics	1987	^{[a]}
Escape from the Planet of the Robot Monsters	Domark	Atari/Tengen	1990	^{[a]}
Espionage	Grandslam Entertainment		1988	
Eureka!	Domark		1984	^{[a]}
Euro Boss	Challenge Software		1991	
European 5-a-Side	Silverbird Software		1988	^{[a]}
European Champions	E&J Software		1988	
European Soccer Challenge	Players Software		1990	
European Superleague	CDS Micro Systems		1991	^{[a]}
Evening Star	Hewson Consultants		1987	^{[a]}
Everest Ascent	Richard Shepherd Software		1983	^{[zx]}
Every Second Counts	TV Games	BBC	1988	
Everyone's a Wally	Mikro-Gen		1985	
Excalibur: Sword of Kings	Alternative Software		1987	
Exolon	Hewson Consultants		1987	^{[a]}
Exploding Fist +	Firebird Software		1988	^{[a]}
Exploding Wall	Byte Back		1989	
Express Raider	U.S. Gold	Data East	1987	^{[a]}
Exterminator	Audiogenic Software	Gottlieb	1991	^{[a]}
Extreme	Digital Integration		1991	^{[a]}
F-15 Strike Eagle	MicroProse		1987	^{[a]}
F-16 Combat Pilot	Digital Integration		1991	^{[a]}
F-16 Fighting Falcon	Codemasters		1989	^{[a]}
F1 Tornado	Zeppelin Games		1991	^{[a]}
Fairlight	Edge Software		1985	^{[a]}
Fairlight II	Edge Software		1986	^{[a]}
Falcon Patrol II	Virgin Games		1985	^{[a]}
Falklands '82	Personal Software Services		1986	^{[a]}
Fallen Angel	Screen 7		1989	^{[a]}
Fantasia Diamond	Hewson Consultants		1984	^{[a]}
Fantastic American Football	Zeppelin Games		1990	
Fantasy World Dizzy	Codemasters		1989	^{[a]}
Fast Food	Codemasters		1989	^{[a]}
Fat Worm Blows a Sparky	Durell Software		1986	^{[a]}
Father of Darkness	Central Solutions		1984	
Fernandez Must Die	Image Works		1988	^{[a]}
Fernando Martín Basket Master	Dinamic Software	Fernando Martín	1987	
Feud	Bulldog		1987	^{[a]}
Fiendish Freddy's Big Top o' Fun	Mindscape	Gray Matter	1990	^{[a]}
Fighter Bomber	Activision		1990	^{[a]}
Fighter Pilot	Digital Integration		1983	
Fighting Soccer	Activision	SNK	1989	^{[a]}
Fighting Warrior	Melbourne House		1985	^{[a]}
Final Assault	U.S. Gold	Epyx	1988	^{[a]}
Final Fight	U.S. Gold	Capcom	1991	^{[a]}
Finders Keepers	Mastertronic		1985	^{[a]}
Fire and Forget	Titus Software		1988	^{[a]}
Firebirds	Softek		1983	^{[zx]}
Firefly	Ocean Software		1988	^{[a]}
Firelord	Hewson Consultants		1986	^{[a]}
Fireman Sam: The Hero Next Door	Alternative Software	BBC Enterprises	1992	
First Past the Post	Cult Games		1988	
Fish!	Rainbird Software		1989	^{[a]}
Flak	U.S. Gold		1985	^{[a]}
Flash Gordon	Mastertronic	King Features Syndicate	1987	^{[a]}
Flight Simulation	Sinclair Research		1982	^{[zx]}
Flunky	Piranha Software		1987	^{[a]}
Flyer Fox	Bug-Byte		1986	^{[a]}
Flying Shark	Firebird Software	Taito	1987	^{[a]}
Football Champions	Cult Games		1990	^{[a]}
Football Frenzy	Alternative Software		1987	
Football Manager	Addictive Games		1982	^{[zx]}
Football Manager 2	Addictive Games		1988	^{[a]}
Football Manager 3	Addictive Games		1991	^{[a]}
Football Manager: World Cup Edition	Addictive Games		1990	^{[a]}
Footballer of the Year 2	Gremlin Graphics		1989	^{[a]}
For Gold or Glory	Alternative Software		1988	
Forgotten Worlds	U.S. Gold	Capcom	1989	^{[a]}
Formula One	CRL Group		1985	^{[a]}
Foxx Fights Back	Image Works		1988	^{[a]}
Fraction Fever	Spinnaker Software		1984	
Frank Bruno's Boxing	Elite Systems	Frank Bruno	1985	^{[a]}
Frankenstein	CRL Group		1987	^{[a]}
Frankie Goes to Hollywood	Ocean Software	Frankie Goes to Hollywood	1985	^{[a]}
Fred	Indescomp		1983	^{[a]}
Freddy Hardest	Dinamic Software		1987	^{[a]}
Freddy Hardest in South Manhattan	Dinamic Software		1989	
Freedom Fighter	Power House, The		1988	^{[a]}
Frenzy	Spectrum Games		1983	
Friday the 13th: The Computer Game	Domark	Paramount Pictures	1986	^{[a]}
Frightmare	Cascade Games		1988	^{[a]}
Frogger	A&F Software		1983	^{[zx]}
Frontline	Zeppelin Games		1988	^{[a]}
Fruit Machine Simulator	Codemasters		1987	^{[a]}
Fruit Machine Simulator 2	Codemasters		1990	^{[a]}
Full Throttle	Micromega/Zeppelin Games		1984	^{[a]}
Full Throttle 2	Zeppelin Games		1990	^{[a]}
Fun School 2	Database Educational Software		1989	^{[a]}
Fun School 3	Database Educational Software		1991	
Fun School 4	Europress Software		1992	^{[a]}
Future Bike Simulator	Hi-Tec Software		1990	^{[a]}
Future Knight	Gremlin Graphics		1986	^{[a]}
G-LOC: R360	U.S. Gold	Sega	1992	^{[a]}
G.I. Hero	Firebird Software		1988	^{[a]}
Galactic Games	Activision		1988	^{[a]}
Galactic Invasion	Sinclair Research Ltd		1984	
Galaxian	Atarisoft	Namco	1984	^{[a]}
Galaxians	Artic Computing		1982	^{[zx]}
Galaxy Force	Activision	Sega	1989	^{[a]}
Galletron	Bulldog		1987	
Game Over	Dinamic Software		1987	^{[a]}
Garfield: Big Fat Hairy Deal	The Edge	United Features Syndicate	1988	^{[a]}
Garfield: Winter's Tail	The Edge	United Features Syndicate	1990	^{[a]}
Gary Lineker's Hot-Shot!	Gremlin Graphics	Gary Lineker	1988	^{[a]}
Gary Lineker's Superskills	Gremlin Graphics	Gary Lineker	1988	^{[a]}
Gary Lineker's Superstar Soccer	Gremlin Graphics	Gary Lineker	1987	^{[a]}
Gauntlet	U.S. Gold	Atari Games	1987	^{[a]}
Gauntlet II	U.S. Gold	Atari Games	1988	^{[a]}
Gauntlet III: The Final Quest	U.S. Gold	Atari Games	1991	^{[a]}
Gauntlet: The Deeper Dungeons	U.S. Gold	Atari Games	1987	^{[a]}
Gazza II	Empire Software	Paul Gascoigne	1990	^{[a]}
Gazza's Super Soccer	Empire Software	Paul Gascoigne	1990	^{[a]}
GBA Championship Basketball: Two-on-Two	Gamestar	Activision	1987	
Gee Bee Air Rally	Activision		1988	^{[a]}
Gemini Wing	Virgin Mastertronic	Tecmo	1989	^{[a]}
GFL Championship Football	Gamestar	Activision	1987	
Ghost Hunters	Codemasters		1987	^{[a]}
Ghost Town	Virgin Games		1983	^{[a]}
Ghostbusters	Activision	Columbia Pictures	1984	^{[a]}
Ghostbusters II	Activision	Columbia Pictures	1989	^{[a]}
Ghosts 'n Goblins	Elite Systems	Capcom	1986	^{[a]}
Ghouls 'n Ghosts	U.S. Gold	Capcom	1989	^{[a]}
Giant Killer	Topologika		1988	
Gift from the Gods	Ocean Software		1984	^{[a]}
Gilbert: Escape from Drill	Again Again		1989	^{[a]}
Gilligan's Gold	Ocean Software		1984	
Give My Regards to Broad Street	Mind Games	Twentieth Century-Fox	1985	^{[a]}
Gladiator (48K and 128K)	Domark		1985	^{[a]}
Glider Rider	Quicksilva		1986	^{[a]}
Global Commander	Martech		1987	
Glug Glug	CRL Group		1984	^{[a]}
Gnome Ranger	Level 9		1987	^{[a]}
Count and Add	Scetlander		1990	
Henrietta's Book of Spells	Scetlander		1990	
Hooray for Henrietta	Scetlander		1990	
Mix and Match with Maggie	Scetlander		1990	
Golden Axe	Virgin Games	Sega	1990	^{[a]}
Golden Basket	Opera Soft		1990	
Gonzzalezz	Opera Soft		1989	
Good Luck	Top Ten Software		1987	
Goody	Opera Soft		1987	
Graeme Souness Soccer Manager	Zeppelin Games	Graeme Souness	1992	^{[a]}
Nemesis	Konami	Konami	1987	^{[a]}
Graham Gooch's Test Cricket	Audiogenic Software	Graham Gooch	1986	^{[a]}
Grand National	Elite Systems		1985	^{[a]}
Grand Prix	D&H Games		1989	^{[a]}
Grand Prix Challenge	Challenge Software/Holburn Software		1992	^{[a]}
Grand Prix Circuit	Accolade		1990	
Grand Prix Manager	Silicon Joy		1984	
Grand Prix Simulator	Codemasters		1987	^{[a]}
Grand Prix Simulator 2	Codemasters		1989	
Grand Prix Tennis	Mastertronic Added Dimension		1988	^{[a]}
Grange Hill	Argus Press Software		1987	^{[a]}
Granny's Garden	4Mation Educational Resources		1983	
Great Britain Ltd	Hessel Software		1982	^{[zx]}
Great Gurianos	Hit-Pak	Taito	1987	^{[a]}
Gregory Loses His Clock	Mastertronic Plus		1989	^{[a]}
Grell and Fella	Codemasters		1992	^{[a]}
Gremlins 2: The New Batch	Topo Soft/Elite Systems	Amblin Entertainment/Warner Bros.	1990	^{[a]}
Gremlins: The Adventure	Adventure International	Warner Bros. Pictures	1985	^{[a]}
Grid Iron 2	Alternative Software		1989	
Ground Attack	Silversoft		1982	^{[zx]}
Grumpy Gumphrey Supersleuth	Gremlin Graphics		1985	^{[a]}
Gryzor	Ocean Software	Konami	1987	^{[a]}
Guadalcanal	Activision		1987	^{[a]}
Guardian II: Revenge of the Mutants	Hi-Tec Software		1990	
Guerrilla War	Imagine Software	SNK	1988	
Guillermo Tell	Opera Soft		1989	
Gun.Smoke	Topo Soft	Capcom	1987	^{[a]}
Gunboat	Accolade		1990	^{[a]}
Gunfighter	Atlantis Software		1988	^{[a]}
Gunfright	Ultimate Play the Game		1985	^{[a]}
Gunship	MicroProse		1987	^{[a]}
Gutz	Ocean Software		1988	^{[a]}
Gyroscope	Melbourne House		1985	^{[a]}
H.A.R.D	IJK Software		1987	
H.A.T.E.: Hostile All-Terrain Encounter	Gremlin Graphics		1989	^{[a]}
H.E.R.O.	Activision		1984	^{[a]}
Hacker	Activision		1985	^{[a]}
Hacker II: The Doomsday Papers	Activision		1987	^{[a]}
Hades Nebula	Nexus Productions		1987	^{[a]}
Halls of the Things	Crystal Computing		1983	^{[zx]}
Hammer Boy	Dinamic Software		1991	
Hammer-Head	Zigurat		1992	
Hammerfist	Activision		1990	^{[a]}
Hampstead	Melbourne House		1984	^{[a]}
Hard Cheese	DK'Tronics		1983	^{[zx]}
Hard Drivin'	Domark	Tengen/Atari	1989	^{[a]}
HardBall!	Advance Software	Accolade	1986	^{[a]}
Hareraiser	Haresoft	Kit Williams	1984	
Harrier Attack	Durell Software		1983	
Havoc	Players Premier Software		1990	
Hawk Storm	Players Software		1991	^{[a]}
Head over Heels	Ocean Software		1987	^{[a]}
Headcoach	Addictive Games		1986	^{[a]}
Headstart	Bug-Byte		1987	
Heartbroken	Atlantis Software		1989	^{[a]}
Heartland	Odin Computer Graphics		1986	^{[a]}
Heavy Metal	U.S. Gold	Access Software	1990	^{[a]}
Heavy on the Magick	Gargoyle Games		1986	^{[a]}
Hellfire Attack	Martech		1989	^{[a]}
Helter Skelter	Audiogenic Software	The Assembly Line	1991	^{[a]}
Hercules	Power House, The	Interdisc	1986	^{[a]}
Hercules: Slayer of the Damned	Gremlin Graphics		1988	^{[a]}
HeroQuest	Gremlin Graphics	Milton Bradley Company	1991	^{[a]}
Hi Q. Quiz	Blue Ribbon Software		1989	^{[a]}
Hideous	Alternative Software		1992	^{[a]}
High Frontier	Activision		1987	^{[a]}
High Steel	Screen 7		1989	^{[a]}
Highlander	Ocean Software	Thorn EMI Screen Entertainment	1986	^{[a]}
Highway Encounter	Vortex Software		1985	^{[a]}
Hijack	Electric Dreams Software		1986	^{[a]}
Hobgoblin	Atlantis Software		1991	^{[a]}
Hong Kong Phooey	Hi-Tec Software	Hanna-Barbera	1990	^{[a]}
Hopper Copper	Silverbird Software		1988	^{[a]}
Hoppin' Mad	Elite Systems	Tatsumi	1988	^{[a]}
Horace and the Spiders	Psion		1983	^{[zx]}
Horace Goes Skiing	Psion		1982	^{[zx]}
Hostages	Infogrames		1990	^{[a]}
Hot Rod	Activision	Sega	1990	^{[a]}
HotShot	Addictive Games		1988	^{[a]}
How to Be a Complete Bastard	Virgin Games	Adrian Edmondson	1987	^{[a]}
Howard the Duck	Activision	Lucasfilm	1987	^{[a]}
Hudson Hawk	Ocean Software	Columbia Pictures	1991	^{[a]}
Human Killing Machine	U.S. Gold		1988	^{[a]}
Humphrey	Zigurat		1988	
Hunchback	Ocean Software	Century Electronics	1984	^{[a]}
Hundra	Dinamic Software		1988	
Hungry Horace	Psion		1982	^{[zx]}
Hunter	Atlantis Software		1991	
Huxley Pig	Alternative Software	FilmFair	1991	^{[a]}
Hydra	Domark	Tengen/Atari Games	1991	^{[a]}
Hydrofool	Faster Than Light		1987	^{[a]}
Hypaball	Odin Computer Graphics		1986	
Side Arms	Go!	Capcom	1988	^{[a]}
Hyper Sports	Imagine Software	Konami	1985	^{[a]}
Hysteria	Software Projects		1987	^{[a]}
I Alien	CRL Group		1988	
I, Ball	Firebird Software		1987	
I, Ball 2: Quest for the Past	Firebird Software		1987	^{[a]}
Ian Botham's Test Match	Tynesoft	Ian Botham	1985	
Ice Breaker	Topo Soft		1990	
iD	Nu Wave Software		1986	
Ikari Warriors	Elite Systems	SNK	1988	^{[a]}
Impact	Audiogenic Software		1988	^{[a]}
Implosion	Cascade Games		1987	
Impossamole	Gremlin Graphics		1990	^{[a]}
Impossible Mission	U.S. Gold	Epyx	1985	
Impossible Mission II	U.S. Gold	Epyx	1988	^{[a]}
Incredible Shrinking Fireman	Mastertronic		1986	
Incredible Shrinking Sphere	Electric Dreams Software		1989	^{[a]}
Indiana Jones and the Fate of Atlantis	U.S. Gold	LucasArts	1992	
Indiana Jones and the Last Crusade: The Action Game	U.S. Gold	Lucasfilm/Paramount Pictures	1989	
Indiana Jones and the Temple of Doom	U.S. Gold	Atari Games	1987	
Indoor Sports	Advance Software	SportTime/DesignStar Consultants	1987	
Infiltrator	U.S. Gold		1986	
Ingrid's Back	Level 9		1988	^{[a]}
Insector Hecti in the Interchange	Hi-Tec Software		1991	^{[a]}
Inside Outing	The Edge		1988	^{[a]}
Inspector Gadget and the Circus of Fear	Melbourne House	Lexington Broadcast Services Company	1987	
Intensity	Firebird Software		1988	^{[a]}
Interalia	Atlantis Software		1990	
Intergalactic Cage Match	Entertainment USA		1988	
International 3D Tennis	Palace Software		1990	^{[a]}
International 5 A Side Football	Zeppelin Games		1992	
International Football	Cult Games		1989	^{[a]}
International Karate	System 3		1985	
International Karate +	System 3		1987	^{[a]}
International Match Day	Ocean Software		1985	
International Ninja Rabbits	Micro Value		1991	
International Rugby Simulator	Codemasters		1988	^{[a]}
International Speedway	Silverbird Software		1988	^{[a]}
International Tennis	Zeppelin Games		1992	
Into the Eagle's Nest	Pandora		1987	^{[a]}
Invaders	Artic Computing		1982	^{[zx]}
Invasion	Bulldog		1987	
Invasion Force	Artic Computing		1982	^{[zx]}
Invasion Force	Cases Computer Simulations		1990	^{[a]}
Invasion of the Body Snatchas!	Crystal Computing		1983	
Iron Lord	Ubisoft		1989	^{[a]}
It's Only Rock 'n' Roll	K-Tel Productions		1983	^{[a]}
Italian Supercar	Codemasters		1990	^{[a]}
Italy 1990	U.S. Gold		1990	^{[a]}
Iwo Jima	Personal Software Services		1986	
Jack the Nipper	Gremlin Graphics		1986	^{[a]}
Jack the Nipper II: In Coconut Capers	Gremlin Graphics		1987	^{[a]}
Jack the Ripper	CRL Group		1987	
Jackal	Konami	Konami	1986	^{[a]}
Jackle & Wide	Bulldog		1987	
Jahangir Khan's World Championship Squash	Krisalis Software	Jahangir Khan	1991	^{[a]}
Jail Break	Konami	Konami	1987	
Jason's Gem	Mastertronic		1985	
Jaws	Screen 7	Universal Pictures	1989	^{[a]}
Jet Bike Simulator	Codemasters		1988	^{[a]}
Jet Set Willy	Software Projects		1984	^{[a]}
Jet Set Willy II: The Final Frontier	Software Projects		1985	^{[a]}
Jetpac	Ultimate Play the Game		1983	^{[zx]}
Jewels of Darkness	Rainbird Software		1986	
Jimmy's Soccer Manager	Beyond Belief		1991	
Jimmy's Super League	Beyond Belief		1992	
Jinxter	Rainbird Software		1987	^{[a]}
Jocky Wilson's Compendium of Darts	Zeppelin Games	Jocky Wilson	1991	^{[a]}
Jocky Wilson's Darts Challenge	Zeppelin Games	Jocky Wilson	1989	^{[a]}
Joe Blade	Players Software		1987	
Joe Blade 2	Players Software		1988	
Joe Blade 3	Players Premier Software		1989	^{[a]}
John Elway's Quarterback	Virgin Games	Leland Corporation	1990	
Jonah Barrington's Squash	New Generation Software		1985	^{[a]}
Jonny Quest: Cover-Up at Roswell	Hi-Tec Software	Hanna-Barbera	1991	^{[a]}
Judge Dredd	Melbourne House	2000 AD	1987	
Judge Dredd	Virgin Mastertronic		1991	^{[a]}
Jumbly	DK'Tronics		1983	^{[a]}
Jump	Zigurat		1991	
Jumping Jack	Imagine Software		1983	
Jungle Trouble	Durell Software		1983	
Jungle Warrior	Zigurat		1990	
Kamikaze	Codemasters		1991	^{[a]}
Kane	Mastertronic		1986	^{[a]}
Karateka	Dro Soft	Broderbund	1990	
Karnov	Electric Dreams Software	Data East	1988	^{[a]}
Karyssia: Queen of Diamonds	Incentive Software		1987	^{[a]}
Kayleth	U.S. Gold		1986	^{[a]}
Kemshu	Cult Games		1989	^{[a]}
Kendo Warrior	Byte Back		1989	^{[a]}
Kenny Dalglish Soccer Manager	Cognito Software	Kenny Dalglish	1989	^{[a]}
Kenny Dalglish Soccer Match	Impressions Games	Kenny Dalglish	1990	^{[a]}
Kentilla	Micromega		1984	^{[a]}
Kentucky Racing	Alternative Software		1991	^{[a]}
KGB Superspy	Codemasters		1989	
Kick Box Vigilante	Zeppelin Games		1991	^{[a]}
Kick Off	Anco Software		1989	^{[a]}
Kick Off 2	Anco Software		1990	^{[a]}
Kids on Keys	Spinnaker Software		1984	
Kikstart 2	Mastertronic		1988	^{[a]}
Killed Until Dead	U.S. Gold		1987	^{[a]}
Killer Kong	Blaby Computer Games		1983	
King Arthur's Quest	Hill MacGibbon		1984	
Kirel	Addictive Games		1986	^{[a]}
Klax	Domark	Tengen/Atari Games	1990	^{[a]}
Knight Driver	Hewson Consultants		1984	^{[a]}
Knight Force	Titus Software		1990	^{[a]}
Knight Lore	Ultimate Play the Game		1984	^{[a]}
Knight Orc	Rainbird Software		1987	
Knight Rider	Ocean Software		1986	^{[a]}
Knight Tyme	Mastertronic Added Dimension		1986	^{[a]}
Knightmare	Activision	ITV	1987	^{[a]}
Knot in 3D	New Generation Software		1983	^{[zx]}
Knuckle Busters	Melbourne House		1987	^{[a]}
Kobyashi Naru	Mastertronic		1987	^{[a]}
Kokotoni Wilf	Elite Systems		1984	^{[a]}
Kong Strikes Back!	Ocean Software		1984	^{[a]}
Kong's Revenge	Zigurat		1991	
Kontrabant	ZOTKS		1984	
Kontrabant 2	Radio Student		1984	
Koronis Rift	Activision	LucasArts	1987	^{[a]}
Kosmos	Atlantis Software		1989	^{[a]}
Krakatoa	Abbex Electronics		1984	
Krakout	Gremlin Graphics		1987	^{[a]}
Kung Fu Knights	Top Ten Software		1988	^{[a]}
Kung-Fu Master	U.S. Gold	Data East	1986	^{[a]}
Kwik Snax	Codemasters		1990	^{[a]}
La Abadía del Crimen	Opera Soft		1988	
LA Drugs Bust	Players Software		1990	
Lancelot	Mandarin Software		1988	^{[a]}
Las Vegas Casino	Zeppelin Games		1989	^{[a]}
Laser Snaker	Poppy Soft		1983	^{[zx]}
Laser Squad	Blade Software		1988	^{[a]}
Last Duel	U.S. Gold	Capcom	1989	^{[a]}
Last Mission	Data East		1987	^{[a]}
Last Ninja 2	System 3		1988	^{[a]}
Last Ninja Remix	System 3		1990	
Lazy Jones	Terminal Software		1984	
Leader Board	U.S. Gold		1987	^{[a]}
Leaderboard Tournament	U.S. Gold	Epyx	1988	^{[a]}
League Challenge	Atlantis Software		1988	^{[a]}
League Football	Cult Games		1991	
Learning with Leeper	Software Projects	Sierra On-Line	1985	^{[a]}
LED Storm	Go!	Capcom	1988	^{[a]}
Lee Enfield Space Ace	Infogrames		1988	^{[a]}
Legend of the Amazon Women	U.S. Gold/Mastertronic		1986	^{[a]}
Legions of Death	MC Lothlorien		1987	
Lemmings	Psygnosis		1991	^{[a]}
Leviathan	English Software		1987	
Licence to Kill	Domark	United Artists	1989	^{[a]}
Life-Term	Alternative Software		1987	^{[a]}
Light Force	Faster Than Light		1986	^{[a]}
Lightning Simulator	Silverbird Software		1988	^{[a]}
Line of Fire	U.S. Gold	Sega	1990	^{[a]}
Little Computer People	Activision		1987	^{[a]}
Little Puff in Dragonland	Cartoon Time		1990	^{[a]}
Live and Let Die	Domark	United Artists/Eon Productions	1988	^{[a]}
Livingstone Supongo II	Opera Soft		1989	
Loco	Alligata		1986	^{[a]}
Lode Runner	Software Projects	Broderbund	1984	
Lone Wolf – The Mirror of Death	Audiogenic Software	Joe Dever/Gary Chalk	1991	^{[a]}
Loopz	Audiogenic Software		1991	^{[a]}
Lop Ears	Players Software		1991	^{[a]}
Lord of the Rings: Game One	Melbourne House	J. R. R. Tolkien	1986	^{[a]}
Lords of Chaos	Blade Software		1990	^{[a]}
Lords of Time	Level 9		1983	
Lorna	Topo Soft	Alfonso Azpiri	1990	
Los Angeles SWAT	Entertainment USA		1987	
Lost Caves	Players Premier Software		1989	
Lotus Esprit Turbo Challenge	Gremlin Graphics	Lotus Cars	1990	^{[a]}
Luna Crabs	Micromega		1983	^{[zx]}
Lunar Jetman	Ultimate Play the Game		1983	
MASK III: VENOM Strikes Back	Gremlin Graphics	Kenner	1988	
Macadam Bumper	Personal Software Services		1985	
Mach 3	Loriciels		1989	
Mad Mix 2	Topo Soft	Alfonso Azpiri	1990	
Mad Mix Game	Topo Soft		1988	^{[a]}
Mad Nurse	Firebird Software		1987	^{[a]}
Madballs	Ocean Software	Amtoy	1988	
Magic Johnson's Basketball	Dro Soft	Broderbund	1990	
Magic Meanies	CDS Micro Systems		1983	
Magicland Dizzy	Codemasters		1990	^{[a]}
MagMax	Imagine Software	Nichibutsu	1987	^{[a]}
Magnetron	Firebird Software		1988	^{[a]}
Majik	Mastertronic		1988	
Manchester United	Krisalis Software	Manchester United F.C	1990	^{[a]}
Manchester United Europe	Krisalis Software	Manchester United F.C.	1991	^{[a]}
Mandragore	Infogrames		1984	
Manic Miner	Bug-Byte		1983	^{[a]}
Mantronix	Probe Software		1986	
Marauder	Hewson Consultants		1988	^{[a]}
Marble Madness	Melbourne House	Atari Games	1986	^{[a]}
Mario Bros.	Ocean Software	Nintendo	1987	
Marsport	Gargoyle Games		1985	^{[a]}
Martianoids	Ultimate Play the Game		1987	^{[a]}
Master of Magic	Mastertronic Added Dimension		1986	^{[a]}
Masters of the Universe: The Arcade Game	U.S. Gold	Mattel	1987	^{[a]}
Masters of the Universe: The Movie	Gremlin Graphics	Mattel	1987	^{[a]}
Masters of the Universe: The Super Adventure	U.S. Gold	Mattel	1987	
Match Day	Ocean Software		1984	^{[a]}
Match Day II	Ocean Software		1987	^{[a]}
Match of the Day	Zeppelin Premier	BBC	1992	^{[a]}
Match Point	Sinclair Research		1984	
Maze Mania	Hewson Consultants		1989	^{[a]}
Maziacs	DK'Tronics		1983	^{[zx]}
Mega-Apocalypse	Martech		1988	^{[a]}
Megabucks	Firebird Software		1986	^{[a]}
Meganova	Dinamic Software		1988	^{[a]}
Megapede	Softek		1983	^{[zx]}
Megaphoenix	Dinamic Software		1991	^{[a]}
Mercenary	Novagen Software		1987	
Mercs	U.S. Gold	Capcom	1991	^{[a]}
Merlin	Firebird Software		1988	^{[a]}
Mermaid Madness	Electric Dreams Software		1986	^{[a]}
Metal Army	Players Software		1988	^{[a]}
Metalyx	Alternative Software		1987	
Metaplex	Addictive Games		1988	^{[a]}
Meteoroids	DK'Tronics		1982	^{[zx]}
Metro-Cross	U.S. Gold	Namco	1987	^{[a]}
Metropolis	Power House, The		1988	^{[a]}
Metropolis	Topo Soft		1989	
Miami Chase	Codemasters		1991	^{[a]}
Miami Cobra GT	Players Software		1991	
Miami Vice	Ocean Software	NBC	1986	^{[a]}
Michael Jackson's Moonwalker	U.S. Gold	Warner Bros. Pictures/Michael Jackson	1989	^{[a]}
Michel Futbol Master	Dinamic Software	Míchel	1989	
Mickey Mouse: The Computer Game	Gremlin Graphics	Kenner	1988	^{[a]}
Micro Mouse Goes Debugging	MC Lothlorien		1983	
Micro Mouse Goes De-Bugging	Mastertronic Plus		1989	^{[a]}
Microball	Alternative Software		1988	^{[a]}
MicroProse Soccer	MicroProse		1989	^{[a]}
Midnight Resistance	Ocean Software	Data East	1990	^{[a]}
MiG Busters	Players Premier Software		1990	
MiG-29: Soviet Fighter	Codemasters		1989	
Mike Gunner	Dinamic Software		1988	
Mike Read's Pop Quiz	Elite Systems	BBC	1989	^{[a]}
Mikie	Imagine Software	Konami	1985	^{[a]}
Milk Race	Mastertronic		1987	^{[a]}
Millionaire	Incentive Software		1984	^{[a]}
Mindfighter	Activision		1988	^{[a]}
Mindshadow	Activision		1985	^{[a]}
Mindtrap	Mastertronic		1989	^{[a]}
Mined-Out	Quicksilva		1983	^{[zx]}
Mini-Putt	Accolade		1988	^{[a]}
Mission Elevator	Kixx		1988	
Mission Jupiter	Codemasters		1987	
Mission Omega	Mind Games		1986	^{[a]}
Mithos	Opera Soft		1990	
Molar Maul	Imagine Software		1983	^{[zx]}
Molecule Man	Mastertronic		1986	^{[a]}
Moley Christmas	Gremlin Graphics/Your Sinclair		1987	
Monopoly	Leisure Games	Parker Brothers/Waddingtons	1985	^{[a]}
Monsters in Hell	Softek		1983	^{[zx]}
Monte Carlo Casino	Codemasters		1989	
Monty Is Innocent	Gremlin Graphics		1985	
Monty on the Run	Gremlin Graphics		1985	^{[a]}
Monty Python's Flying Circus: The Computer Game	Virgin Games		1990	^{[a]}
Moon Cresta	Incentive Software	Nichibutsu	1985	^{[a]}
Moonlight Madness	Bubble Bus Software		1986	^{[a]}
Moontorc	Atlantis Software		1991	^{[a]}
Morris Meets the Bikers	Automata UK		1983	
Mortadelo y Filemon II	Dro Soft	Francisco Ibáñez Talavera	1990	
Moto Cross Simulator	Codemasters		1989	
Motor Massacre	Gremlin Graphics		1989	^{[a]}
Motorbike Madness	Mastertronic		1988	^{[a]}
Motorcycle 500	Cult Games		1990	
Motos	Mastertronic Added Dimension	Namco	1987	^{[a]}
Mountain Bike Racer	Positive		1990	
Mountain Bike Racer	Zeppelin Games		1990	^{[a]}
Mountain Bike Simulator	Codemasters		1991	^{[a]}
Movie	Imagine Software		1986	^{[a]}
Moving Target	Players Premier Software		1989	^{[a]}
Mózgprocesor	Computer Adventure Studio		1989	
Mr Freeze	Firebird Software		1984	
Mr. Heli	Firebird Software	Irem	1989	
Mr. Wimpy	Ocean Software	Wimpy	1984	^{[a]}
Mr. Wino	Silverbird Software		1988	
Mrs Mopp	Computasolve		1984	
Ms. Pac-Man	Atarisoft	Namco/Atari Games	1984	^{[a]}
Mugsy	Melbourne House		1984	^{[a]}
Mugsy's Revenge	Melbourne House		1986	^{[a]}
Multi-Player Soccer Manager	D&H Games		1991	^{[a]}
Mundial de Fútbol	Opera Soft		1990	
Murder off Miami	CRL Group		1987	
Murphy	Pirate Software		1988	^{[a]}
Murray Mouse Supercop	Codemasters		1992	^{[a]}
Mushroom Alley	Mogul Communications		1984	
Mutant Fortress	Players Premier Software		1989	^{[a]}
Mutant Zone	Opera Soft		1989	^{[a]}
My Name Is Uncle Groucho, You Win a Fat Cigar	Automata UK		1983	
Mystery of the Indus Valley	Alternative Software		1988	
Mystical	Infogrames		1991	^{[a]}
Myth	Rainbird Software		1989	
Myth: History in the Making	System 3		1989	^{[a]}
N.E.I.L. Android	Alternative Software		1988	
N.O.M.A.D	Ocean Software		1985	^{[a]}
Narc	Ocean Software	Williams Electronics	1990	^{[a]}
Narco Police	Dinamic Software		1990	^{[a]}
NATO Assault Course	CRL Group		1988	
Navy Moves	Dinamic Software		1988	^{[a]}
Navy SEALS	Ocean Software	Orion Pictures	1991	^{[a]}
Nebula	Red Shift		1984	
Nebulus	Hewson Consultants		1987	^{[a]}
Necris Dome	Codemasters		1987	
Neighbours	Impulze	Grundy Television	1992	^{[a]}
Nemesis the Warlock	Martech	2000 AD	1987	^{[a]}
Nether Earth	Argus Press Software		1987	^{[a]}
Netherworld	Hewson Consultants		1988	^{[a]}
New York Warriors	Virgin Games		1990	^{[a]}
Nigel Mansell's Grand Prix	Martech	Nigel Mansell	1988	^{[a]}
Nigel Mansell's World Championship	Gremlin Graphics	Nigel Mansell	1993	^{[a]}
Night Gunner	Digital Integration		1983	^{[a]}
Night Hunter	Ubisoft		1990	^{[a]}^{[a]}
Night Shift	U.S. Gold	Lucasfilm Games	1991	^{[a]}
Nightbreed	Ocean Software		1990	^{[a]}
Night Raider	Gremlin Graphics		1988	
Nightshade	Ultimate Play the Game		1985	^{[a]}
Ninja Commando	Zeppelin Games		1989	^{[a]}
Ninja Hamster	CRL Group		1987	^{[a]}
Ninja Massacre	Codemasters		1989	^{[a]}
Ninja Master	Firebird Software		1986	^{[a]}
Ninja Scooter Simulator	Silverbird Software		1988	^{[a]}
Ninja Spirit	Activision	Irem	1990	^{[a]}
Nodes of Yesod	Odin Computer Graphics		1985	^{[a]}
Nonterraqueous	Mastertronic		1985	^{[a]}
Norman	Power House, The		1988	^{[a]}
North & South	Infogrames	Dupuis	1991	^{[a]}
North Star	Gremlin Graphics		1988	^{[a]}
Nosferatu the Vampyre	Piranha		1986	^{[a]}
Nuclear Countdown	Atlantis Software		1987	^{[a]}
O.K. Yah	Pirate Software		1988	
Obliterator	Melbourne House	Psygnosis	1989	^{[a]}
Octagon	Budgie Budget Software		1987	^{[a]}
Odyssey 1	Perfection Software		1983	
Oh Mummy	Gem Software		1984	^{[a]}
Olli & Lissa 3: The Candlelight Adventure	Cartoon Time		1989	^{[a]}
Olli & Lissa II: Halloween	Silverbird Software		1990	
Olli & Lissa: The Ghost of Shilmore Castle	Firebird Software		1986	^{[a]}
Ometron	Software Projects		1985	
On the Bench	Cult Games		1988	^{[a]}
One Man and His Droid	Mastertronic		1985	^{[a]}
Operation Gunship	Codemasters		1989	
Operation Hanoi	Players Premier Software		1990	
Operation Hormuz	Again Again		1989	^{[a]}
Operation Thunderbolt	Ocean Software	Taito	1989	^{[a]}
Operation Wolf	Ocean Software	Taito	1988	^{[a]}
Orbix the Terrorball	Streetwise		1986	^{[a]}
Orc Attack	Creative Sparks		1984	
Oriental Games	Micro Style		1990	^{[a]}
Oriental Hero	Firebird Software		1987	
Ostron	Softek		1983	^{[zx]}
Out of the Shadows	Mizar Computing		1984	
Out Run	U.S. Gold	Sega	1987	^{[a]}
Out Run Europa	U.S. Gold	Sega	1991	^{[a]}
Outlaw	Players Premier Software		1990	^{[a]}
Overkill	Atlantis Software		1988	^{[a]}
Overlander	Elite Systems		1988	^{[a]}
Overlord	Cases Computer Simulations		1988	^{[a]}
P47 Thunderbolt	Firebird Software	Jaleco	1990	^{[a]}
Pac-Land	Grandslam Entertainment/Quicksilva	Namco	1989	^{[a]}
Pac-Man	Atarisoft	Namco/Atari Games	1984	^{[a]}
Pac-Mania	Grandslam Entertainment	Namco	1988	^{[a]}
Pandemonia	CRL Group		1983	
Panther	Mastertronic		1989	^{[a]}
Paperboy	Elite Systems	Atari Games	1986	^{[a]}
Paperboy 2	Mindscape	Tengen/Atari	1992	^{[a]}
Para Academy	Zeppelin Games		1990	
Para Assault Course	Zeppelin Games		1988	
Paris to Dakar	Codemasters		1991	^{[a]}
Paris-Dakar	Zigurat		1988	
Park Patrol	Firebird Software		1987	
Passing Shot	Image Works	Sega	1989	^{[a]}
Pasteman Pat	Silverbird Software		1989	
Pedro	Imagine Software		1984	^{[a]}
Pegasus Bridge	Personal Software Services		1988	^{[a]}
Penalty Soccer	Gamebusters		1990	
Penetrator	Melbourne House		1982	^{[zx]}
Pentagram	Ultimate Play the Game		1986	^{[a]}
Perico Delgado Maillot Amarillo	Topo Soft	Pedro Delgado	1989	
Periscope Up	Atlantis Software		1989	
Perseus and Andromeda	Digital Fantasia		1983	
Peter Beardsley's International Football	Grandslam Entertainment	Peter Beardsley	1988	^{[a]}
Peter Pack Rat	Silverbird Software	Tengen/Atari Games	1989	
Peter Pan	Hodder & Stoughton		1984	^{[a]}
Peter Shilton's Handball Maradona	Grand Slam		1986	^{[a]}
Phantom Club	Ocean Software		1988	^{[a]}
Pheenix	Megadodo Software		1983	
Phileas Fogg's Balloon Battles	Zeppelin Games		1991	
PHM Pegasus	Electronic Arts	Lucasfilm Games	1988	^{[a]}
Pi-balled	Automata UK		1983	
Pick 'n Pile	Ubisoft		1991	^{[a]}
Pictionary	Domark		1989	^{[a]}
Piggy	Bug-Byte		1988	^{[a]}
Pimania	Automata UK		1982	^{[zx]}
Pinball Power	Mastertronic Plus		1989	^{[a]}
Ping Pong	Imagine Software	Konami	1986	^{[a]}
Pink Panther	Gremlin Graphics	United Artists	1988	^{[a]}
Pipe Mania	Empire Software	The Assembly Line	1990	^{[a]}
Pirate Adventure	Adventure International		1984	
Piromania (a.k.a. Infernal Combustion)	Automata UK		1984	
Piso Zero	Zigurat		1991	
Pit-Fighter	Domark	Tengen/Atari Games	1991	^{[a]}
Pitfall II: Lost Caverns	Activision		1984	
Planet 10	Mastertronic		1989	
Plasma Ball	Atlantis Software		1989	
Platoon	Ocean Software	Hemdale Film Corporation	1988	^{[a]}
Play for Your Life	Imagine Software/Your Sinclair		1988	
Plotting	Ocean Software	Taito	1990	^{[a]}
Pogostick Olympics	Silverbird Software		1988	^{[a]}
Pogotron	Gamebusters		1989	
Pole Position	Atarisoft	Atari Games	1984	^{[a]}
Popeye 2	Alternative Software	King Features Syndicate	1991	^{[a]}
Popeye 3	Alternative Software	King Features Syndicate	1992	^{[a]}
Poseidon: Planet Eleven	Hi-Tec Software		1990	
Postman Pat	Alternative Software	BBC/Woodland Animations	1989	
Postman Pat 2	Alternative Software	BBC/Woodland Animations	1989	^{[a]}
Postman Pat 3: To the Rescue	Alternative Software	BBC Enterprises/Woodland Animations	1992	
Potsworth & Co.	Hi-Tec Software	Hanna-Barbera/Sleepy Kids	1992	^{[a]}
Potty Painter	Rabbit Software		1983	
Potty Pigeon	Gremlin Graphics		1984	
Power Drift	Activision	Sega	1989	^{[a]}
Power Magic	Zigurat		1990	
Power Pyramids	Grandslam Entertainment		1988	
Powerama	Power House, The		1988	
Powerplay: The Game of the Gods	Players Software		1988	
Predator	Activision	20th Century Fox	1987	^{[a]}
Predator 2	Image Works	20th Century Fox	1991	^{[a]}
President	Activision		1987	^{[a]}
Prince Clumsy	Cartoon Time		1990	^{[a]}
Prison Riot	Players Premier Software		1990	^{[a]}
Pro Golf Simulator	Codemasters		1990	^{[a]}
Pro Mountain Bike Simulator	Alternative Software		1989	^{[a]}
Pro PowerBoat Simulator	Codemasters		1989	
Pro Tennis Simulator	Codemasters		1990	
Pro Tennis Tour	Ubisoft		1990	^{[a]}
Prodigy	Electric Dreams Software		1986	^{[a]}
Professional BMX Simulator	Codemasters		1988	^{[a]}
Professional Footballer	Cult Games		1991	^{[a]}
Professional Go-Kart Simulator	Zeppelin Games		1990	^{[a]}
Professional Skateboard Simulator	Codemasters		1989	^{[a]}
Professional Ski Simulator	Codemasters		1987	^{[a]}
Professional Snooker Simulator	Codemasters		1987	^{[a]}
Professional Soccer	CRL Group		1989	^{[a]}
Project Stealth Fighter	MicroProse		1990	^{[a]}
Proof of Destruction	Mastertronic		1988	
Protector	Mastertronic Plus		1989	^{[a]}
Prowler	Mastertronic		1988	^{[a]}
Pssst	Ultimate Play the Game		1983	^{[zx]}
Psycho City	Players Software		1989	
Psycho Hopper	Mastertronic		1990	^{[a]}
Psycho Pigs U.X.B.	U.S. Gold	Jaleco	1988	^{[a]}
Psycho Soldier	Imagine Software	SNK	1987	^{[a]}
Psytron	Beyond Software		1984	^{[a]}
Pub Trivia	Codemasters		1990	^{[a]}
Pud Pud in Weird World	Ocean Software		1985	
Puffy's Saga	Ubisoft		1989	^{[a]}
Pulsator	Martech		1987	^{[a]}
Pulse Warrior	Mastertronic		1988	
Pulsoids	Mastertronic		1988	
Punch & Judy	Alternative Software		1989	
Punchy	Mr. Micro		1983	
Purple Saturn Day	Exxos		1989	
Puszka Pandory	None (independent)		1986	
Puzznic	Ocean Software	Taito	1990	^{[a]}
Pyjamarama	Mikro-Gen		1984	^{[a]}
Pyracurse	Hewson Consultants		1986	^{[a]}
Q10 Tankbuster	Zeppelin Games		1992	^{[a]}
Quackers	Rabbit Software		1983	^{[a]}
Quartet	Activision	Sega	1987	^{[a]}
Quazatron	Hewson Consultants		1986	^{[a]}
Quest Adventure	Hewson Consultants		1983	
Questprobe featuring Human Torch and the Thing	Adventure International	Marvel Comics	1986	^{[a]}
Questprobe featuring Spider-Man	Adventure International	Marvel Comics	1984	
Questprobe featuring The Hulk	Adventure International	Marvel Comics	1984	
Quick Draw McGraw	Hi-Tec Software	Hanna-Barbera	1991	
R-Type	Electric Dreams Software	Irem	1988	^{[a]}
R.A.M.	Topo Soft	Alfonso Azpiri	1990	
R.B.I. 2 Baseball	Domark	Tengen/Atari Games	1991	^{[a]}
Rad Ramp Racer	Mastertronic		1990	^{[a]}
Raid over Moscow	U.S. Gold	Access Software	1985	^{[a]}
Raider of the Cursed Mine	Arcade Software		1983	
Rainbow Islands: The Story of Bubble Bobble 2	Ocean Software	Taito	1990	^{[a]}
Rally Cross	Anco Software		1989	
Rally Simulator	Zeppelin Games		1989	^{[a]}
Rallycross Simulator	Codemasters		1990	^{[a]}
Rambo	Ocean Software	Carolco Pictures	1985	^{[a]}
Rambo III	Ocean Software	Carolco Pictures	1988	^{[a]}
Rampage	Activision	Bally Midway	1988	^{[a]}
Ramparts	Go!	Capcom	1988	^{[a]}
Ranarama	Hewson Consultants		1987	^{[a]}
Rastan Saga	Imagine Software	Taito	1988	^{[a]}
Raster Runner	Mastertronic		1990	^{[a]}
Rasterscan	Mastertronic		1987	^{[a]}
Raw Recruit	Mastertronic Added Dimension		1988	
Ready Steady Go	Alternative Software		1988	
Realm of Impossibility	Ariolasoft	Free Fall Associates	1985	^{[a]}
Reaper	Ubisoft		1991	^{[a]}
Rebel Planet	U.S. Gold		1986	^{[a]}
Rebelstar	Firebird Software		1986	^{[a]}
Rebelstar II	Silverbird Software		1988	^{[a]}
Rebelstar Raiders	Red Shift		1984	
Reckless Rufus	Alternative Software		1992	^{[a]}
Red Heat	Ocean Software	Carolco Pictures	1989	^{[a]}
Red LED	Starlight Software		1987	^{[a]}
Red Moon	Level 9 Computing		1985	^{[a]}
Renegade	Imagine Software	Taito	1987	^{[a]}
Renegade III: The Final Chapter	Imagine Software		1989	^{[a]}
Repton Mania	Superior Software/Alligata		1989	^{[a]}
Repulsar	Softek		1983	^{[zx]}
Rescate Atlantida	Dinamic Software		1989	
Rescate en el Golfo	Opera Soft		1990	
Rescue	Mastertronic		1987	^{[a]}
Rescue on Fractalus!	Activision	Lucasfilm Games	1986	^{[a]}
Return of the Jedi: Death Star Battle	Parker Software/Sinclair Research		1984	
Return to Eden	Level 9		1984	
Reveal	Mastertronic		1989	^{[a]}
Revolution	U.S. Gold		1986	^{[a]}
Revolver	Alternative Software		1988	
Rex	Martech		1988	^{[a]}
Rick Dangerous	Firebird Software		1989	^{[a]}
Rick Dangerous 2	Micro Style		1990	^{[a]}
Riddler's Den	Electric Dreams Software		1985	^{[a]}
Rigel's Revenge	Bulldog		1987	^{[a]}
Rik the Roadie	Alternative Software		1988	
Ring Wars	Cascade Games		1989	^{[a]}
River Raid	Activision		1984	
River Rescue	Thorn EMI Computer Software		1984	
Road Runner	U.S. Gold	Atari Games	1987	^{[a]}
Road Runner and Wile E. Coyote	Hi-Tec Software	Warner Bros.	1991	
RoadBlasters	U.S. Gold	Atari Games	1988	^{[a]}
Roadwars	Melbourne House		1987	^{[a]}
Robin Hood – Legend Quest	Codemasters		1993	^{[a]}
Robin of Sherlock	Silversoft		1985	^{[a]}
Robin of Sherwood: The Touchstones of Rhiannon	Adventure International		1985	^{[a]}
Robin of the Wood	Odin Computer Graphics		1985	^{[a]}
Robin Smith's International Cricket	Challenge Software	Robin Smith	1990	
RoboCop	Ocean Software	Orion Pictures Corporation	1988	^{[a]}
RoboCop 2	Ocean Software	Orion Pictures Corporation/Tobor Productions	1990	^{[a]}
RoboCop 3	Ocean Software	Orion Pictures Corporation	1992	^{[a]}
Robon	Softek		1983	^{[zx]}
Robozone	Image Works		1991	^{[a]}
Rock 'n' Roll	Rainbow Arts		1989	^{[a]}
Rock Star Ate My Hamster	Codemasters		1989	^{[a]}
Rock'n Roller	Topo Soft		1988	
Rock'n Wrestle	Melbourne House		1985	^{[a]}
Rockfall	Top Ten Software		1988	^{[a]}
Rockford	Mastertronic Added Dimension		1987	^{[a]}
Rocman	Alligata	Magic Team	1986	
Rod Land	Storm Software	Jaleco	1991	^{[a]}
Rogue	Mastertronic		1988	
Rogue Trooper	Piranha Software	2000 AD	1986	^{[a]}
Rollaround	Mastertronic		1988	^{[a]}
Roller Coaster	Elite Systems		1986	^{[a]}
Rolling Thunder	U.S. Gold	Namco	1988	^{[a]}
Rommel's Revenge	Crystal Computing		1983	
Round the Bend	Impulze	Hat Trick Productions/Yorkshire Television	1991	^{[a]}
Roundheads	Argus Press Software		1987	^{[a]}
Roy of the Rovers	Gremlin Graphics	Fleetway Publications	1988	^{[a]}
Rubicon	Bug-Byte		1987	
Ruff & Reddy in the Space Adventure	Hi-Tec Software	Hanna-Barbera	1990	^{[a]}
Rugby Boss	Alternative Software		1989	
Rugby Coach	Cult Games		1991	^{[a]}
Rugby League Manager	Mastertronic Plus		1989	
Run Baby Run	Firebird Software		1983	
Run the Gauntlet	Ocean Software	ITV	1989	^{[a]}
Rupert and the Ice Castle	Bug-Byte	Daily Express (Rupert Bear)	1986	
Rupert and the Toymaker's Party	Quicksilva	Daily Express (Rupert Bear)	1985	^{[a]}
Rygar	U.S. Gold	Temco	1987	^{[a]}
S.M.A.S.H.E.D.	Alternative Software		1987	
S.T.I.	Bug-Byte		1988	
S.T.U.N. Runner	Domark	Tengen/Atari Games	1990	^{[a]}
Sabotage	Zeppelin Games		1988	^{[a]}
Saboteur	Durell Software		1986	
Saboteur II: Avenging Angel	Durell Software		1987	^{[a]}
Sabre Wulf	Ultimate Play the Game		1984	^{[a]}
Sai Combat	Mirrorsoft		1986	^{[a]}
Saigon Combat Unit	Players Premier Software		1989	^{[a]}
Sailing	Activision		1987	^{[a]}
Saimazoom	Dinamic Software		1984	
Saint and Greavsie	Grandslam Entertainment	ITV	1989	^{[a]}
Saint Dragon	Storm Software	Jaleco	1990	^{[a]}
Salamander	Konami	Konami	1987	^{[a]}
Samantha Fox Strip Poker	Martech	Samantha Fox	1986	^{[a]}
Samurai Warrior: The Battles of Usagi Yojimbo	Firebird Software	Stan Sakai	1988	^{[a]}
Santa's Xmas Caper	Zeppelin Games		1991	^{[a]}
Sanxion	Thalamus		1989	^{[a]}
SAS Combat Simulator	Codemasters		1989	^{[a]}
Satan	Dinamic Software		1989	^{[a]}
Satcom	Atlantis Software		1987	^{[a]}
Savage	Firebird Software		1988	^{[a]}
Scalextric: The Computer Edition	Leisure Genius	Hornby Hobbies	1985	^{[a]}
Scapeghost	Level 9		1989	^{[a]}
Sceptre of Bagdad	Atlantis Software		1987	^{[a]}
Schizofrenia	Quicksilva		1985	
Survival	Macmillan Software/Sinclair Research		1984	
Scooby-Doo	Elite Systems	Hanna-Barbera	1986	^{[a]}
Scooby-Doo and Scrappy-Doo	Hi-Tec Software	Hanna-Barbera	1991	^{[a]}
Scott Adams Scoops	U.S. Gold		1987	
Scramble Spirits	Grandslam Entertainment	Sega	1990	^{[a]}
Scuba Dive	Durell Software		1983	^{[a]}
Scuba Kidz	Silverbird Software		1988	^{[a]}
Scumball	Bulldog		1988	^{[a]}
SDI	Activision	Sega	1988	^{[a]}
Seabase Delta	Firebird Software		1986	
Seahawk	Atlantis Software		1990	
Seas of Blood	Adventure International	Puffin Books	1985	^{[a]}
Senda Salvaje	Zigurat		1990	
Sergeant Seymour Robot Cop	Codemasters		1992	^{[a]}
Seymour Goes to Hollywood	Codemasters		1991	
Shackled	U.S. Gold	Data East	1988	^{[a]}
Shadow Dancer	U.S. Gold	Sega	1991	^{[a]}
Shadow of the Beast	Gremlin Graphics	Psygnosis	1990	^{[a]}
Shadow Warriors	Ocean Software	Temco	1990	
Shadowfire	Beyond Software		1985	^{[a]}
Shadows of Mordor: Game Two of Lord of the Rings	Melbourne House	J. R. R. Tolkien	1987	^{[a]}
Shaken but Not Stirred	Richard Shepherd Software		1982	^{[zx]}
Shanghai Karate	Players Software		1988	^{[a]}
Shanghai Warriors	Players Software		1989	^{[a]}
Shao-lin's Road	Edge Software	Konami	1986	^{[a]}
Shard of Inovar	Bulldog		1987	^{[a]}
Shark	Players Premier Software		1989	
Sharkeys Moll	Zeppelin Games		1991	^{[a]}
Sherlock	Melbourne House		1984	^{[a]}
Shinobi	Virgin Games	Sega	1989	^{[a]}
Shockway Rider	Faster Than Light		1987	^{[a]}
Shoot-Out	Martech		1989	^{[a]}
Short Circuit	Ocean Software	Columbia TriStar Pictures	1987	^{[a]}
Sidewinder II	Mastertronic Plus		1989	^{[a]}
Sidewize	Firebird Software		1987	^{[a]}
Sigma 7	Durell Software		1987	^{[a]}
Silent Service	MicroProse		1987	^{[a]}
Silent Shadow	Topo Soft		1988	
Silicon Dreams	Level 9		1986	^{[a]}
Silkworm	Virgin Games	Tecmo	1989	^{[a]}
SimCity	Infogrames	Maxis	1990	^{[a]}
Simulador Profesional de Tenis	Dinamic Software		1990	
Sir Lancelot	Melbourne House		1984	
Sirwood	Opera Soft		1990	
Sito Pons 500cc Grand Prix	Zigurat	Sito Pons	1990	
Skate Crazy	Gremlin Graphics		1988	
Skate or Die!	Electronic Arts		1989	^{[a]}
Skateball	Ubisoft		1988	^{[a]}
Skateboard Construction System	Players Software		1988	
Skateboard Joust	Silverbird Software		1989	
Skateboard Kidz	Silverbird Software		1988	^{[a]}
Skatin' USA	Atlantis Software		1989	^{[a]}
Skool Daze	Microsphere		1985	^{[a]}
Skull & Crossbones	Domark	Tengen/Atari Games	1991	^{[a]}
Sky High Stuntman	Codemasters		1991	
Sky Runner	Cascade Games		1987	^{[a]}
Skyfox	Ariolasoft	Electronic Arts	1985	^{[a]}
Slaine, the Celtic Barbarian	Martech	2000 AD	1987	^{[a]}
Slap Fight	Imagine Software	Taito	1987	^{[a]}
Sleepwalker	Zeppelin Games		1992	^{[a]}
Slightly Magic	Codemasters		1991	^{[a]}
Slug	Alternative Software		1988	
Sly Spy	Ocean Software	Data East	1990	^{[a]}
Smaily	Zigurat		1991	
Smash TV	Ocean Software	Williams Electronics	1991	^{[a]}
Smrkci (Strumpfovi)	Xenon		1985	
Snare	Beyond Belief/Holburn Software		1992	^{[a]}
Snowball	Level 9		1983	
Snoball in Hell	Atlantis Software		1989	
Snooker	Visions Software Factory		1983	^{[a]}
Snooker Management	D&H Games		1989	^{[a]}
Snooker Manager	Image Software		1989	^{[a]}
Snookered	Top Ten Software		1988	^{[a]}
Snoopy	The Edge	United Features Syndicate	1990	^{[a]}
Snowstrike	U.S. Gold	Epyx	1990	^{[a]}
Soccer 7	Cult Games		1989	
Soccer Challenge	Alternative Software		1990	
Soccer Pinball	Codemasters		1992	^{[a]}
Soccer Q	Cult Games		1989	^{[a]}
Soccer Rivals	Cult Games		1991	
Soccer Star	Cult Games		1989	
Soft & Cuddly	Power House, The		1987	^{[a]}
Soft Aid	Quicksilva		1985	
Software House	Cult Games		1988	
Software Star	Addictive Games		1985	
Soldier of Light	ACE Software	Taito	1988	^{[a]}
Soldier of Fortune	Firebird Software		1988	^{[a]}
Sol Negro	Opera Soft		1989	
Solo	Opera Soft		1989	
Solomon's Key	U.S. Gold	Tecmo	1987	^{[a]}
Son of Blagger	Alligata		1984	^{[a]}
Sonic Boom	Activision	Sega	1990	^{[a]}
Sootland	Zafiro Software Division		1988	
Sooty and Sweep	Alternative Software		1990	^{[a]}
Sophistry	CRL Group		1988	^{[a]}
Sorcerer Lord	Personal Software Services		1987	^{[a]}
Sorcery	Virgin Games		1984	^{[a]}
Soul of a Robot	Mastertronic		1985	^{[a]}
Southern Belle	Hewson Consultants		1985	^{[a]}
Soviet	Opera Soft		1990	
Space Crusade	Gremlin Graphics	Games Workshop/Milton Bradley	1992	^{[a]}
Space Gun	Ocean Software	Taito	1992	^{[a]}
Space Harrier	Elite Systems	Sega	1986	^{[a]}
Space Harrier II	Grandslam Entertainment	Sega	1990	^{[a]}
Space Jack	Power House, The		1988	^{[a]}
Space Racer	Loriciels		1988	
Space Rider Jet Pack Co.	Hi-Tec Software		1990	
Space Shuttle: A Journey into Space	Activision		1984	
Spaghetti Western Simulator	Zeppelin Games		1990	^{[a]}
Spectipede	R&R Software		1983	^{[zx]}
Spectrum Safari	CDS Micro Systems		1983	
Speed Zone	Mastertronic		1988	
Speedboat Assassins	Mastertronic Plus		1989	^{[a]}
Spellbound	Beyond Software		1984	
Spellbound	Mastertronic		1985	^{[a]}
Spellbound Dizzy	Codemasters		1991	
Spherical	Rainbow Arts		1989	^{[a]}
Spike in Transylvania	Codemasters		1991	^{[a]}
Spindizzy	Electric Dreams Software		1986	^{[a]}
Spitfire	Encore		1989	^{[a]}
Spitfire 40	Mirrorsoft		1985	^{[a]}
Spitting Image	Domark	Central Independent Television	1988	^{[a]}
Splat!	Incentive Software		1983	^{[zx]}
Split Personalities	Domark		1986	^{[a]}
Spooked	Players Premier Software		1989	^{[a]}
Spooky Castle	Atlantis Software		1991	
Spore	Bulldog		1988	^{[a]}
Sport of Kings	Mastertronic Added Dimension		1986	
Sporting Triangles	CDS Micro Systems	Central Independent Television/ITV	1989	^{[a]}
Spy Hunter	U.S. Gold	Bally Midway	1985	^{[a]}
Spy Snatcher	Topologika		1988	
Spy vs Spy	Beyond Software	First Star Software	1984	
Spy vs Spy II: The Island Caper	Databyte	First Star Software	1987	^{[a]}
Spy vs Spy III: Arctic Antics	Databyte	First Star Software	1988	
Sqij!	Power House, The		1987	
Stack Light Rifle	Stack Computer Services		1983	
Stack-Up	Zeppelin Games		1991	
Stalingrad	Cases Computer Simulations		1988	^{[a]}
Star Control	Accolade		1991	^{[a]}
Star Farce	Mastertronic		1988	^{[a]}
Star Paws	Software Projects		1988	^{[a]}
Star Raiders II	Electric Dreams Software	Atari	1987	^{[a]}
Star Runner	Codemasters		1987	^{[a]}
Star Wars	Domark	Atari	1987	^{[a]}
Star Wars: Droids	Mastertronic Added Dimension	Lucasfilm	1988	^{[a]}
Star Wars: The Empire Strikes Back	Domark	Tengen/Atari	1988	
Star Wreck	Alternative Software		1987	
Starclash	Micromega		1983	
Stardust	Topo Soft		1987	
Starfire	Virgin Games		1983	^{[zx]}
Starfox	Reaktor		1987	
Starglider	Rainbird Software		1986	
Starglider 2	Rainbird Software		1989	^{[a]}
Starquake	Bubble Bus Software		1985	^{[a]}
Steel Eagle	Players Premier Software		1990	
Steg	Codemasters		1992	^{[a]}
Steve Davis Snooker	CDS Micro Systems	Steve Davis	1984	
Stifflip & Co.	Palace Software		1987	^{[a]}
Stir Crazy Featuring Bobo	Infogrames	Paul Deliège/Maurice Rosy	1990	^{[a]}
Stonkers	Imagine Software		1983	
Stop the Express	Sinclair Research		1983	
Stormbringer	Mastertronic		1987	^{[a]}
Stormlord	Hewson Consultants		1989	^{[a]}
Strangeloop	Virgin Games		1984	
Streaker	Bulldog		1987	^{[a]}
Street Cred Boxing	Players Premier Software		1989	
Street Cred Football	Players Premier Software		1989	
Street Fighter	Go!	Capcom	1988	^{[a]}
Street Fighter II: The World Warrior	Go!	Capcom	1992	^{[a]}
Street Gang	Players Software		1989	
Street Gang Football	Codemasters		1989	^{[a]}
Street Hassle	Melbourne House		1988	^{[a]}
Street Hawk	Ocean Software	Universal City Studios	1986	^{[a]}
Street Sports Basketball	U.S. Gold	Epyx	1988	^{[a]}
Strider II	U.S. Gold	Capcom	1990	^{[a]}
Strike Force Harrier	Mirrorsoft		1986	^{[a]}
Strike Force: Cobra	Piranha Software		1986	^{[a]}
Striker	Cult Games		1989	
Striker Manager	Cult Games		1991	^{[a]}
Strontium Dog: The Killing	Quicksilva	2000 AD	1984	^{[a]}
Stryker – In the Crypts of Trogan	Codemasters		1992	^{[a]}
Stunt Bike Simulator	Silverbird Software		1988	^{[a]}
Stunt Car Racer	Micro Style		1989	^{[a]}
Stuntman Seymour	Codemasters		1992	
Styx	Bug-Byte		1983	
Subbuteo	Electronic Zoo	Waddingtons	1990	^{[a]}
Submariner	Atlantis Software		1988	
Subsunk	Firebird Software		1985	
Subway Vigilante	Players Premier Software		1989	
Summer Games	U.S. Gold	Epyx	1988	^{[a]}
Summer Games II	U.S. Gold	Epyx	1988	
Super Car Trans Am	Codemasters		1989	
Super Cars	Gremlin Graphics		1990	
Super Cycle	U.S. Gold	Epyx	1987	^{[a]}
Super Dragon Slayer	Codemasters		1989	^{[a]}
Super G-Man	Codemasters		1987	
Super Gran	Tynesoft Computer Software		1985	
Super Gran: The Adventure	Tynesoft	ITV (Super Gran)	1985	
Super Hang-On	Electric Dreams Software	Sega	1986	^{[a]}
Super Hero	Codemasters		1988	^{[a]}
Super League	Players Premier Software		1989	
Super Monaco GP	U.S. Gold	Sega	1991	^{[a]}
Super Nudge 2000	Mastertronic		1989	
Ivan 'Ironman' Stewart's Super Off Road Racer	Virgin Games	Leland Corporation	1990	
Super Robin Hood	Codemasters		1987	^{[a]}
Super Sapiens	Grupo Editorial SYGRAN		1989	
Super Scramble Simulator	Gremlin Graphics	Magnetic Fields	1989	^{[a]}
Super Seymour Saves the Planet	Codemasters		1991	^{[a]}
Super Space Invaders	Domark	Taito	1991	^{[a]}
Super Sprint	Electric Dreams Software	Atari Games	1987	^{[a]}
Super Stock Car	Mastertronic		1990	^{[a]}
Super Stuntman	Codemasters		1988	^{[a]}
Super Tank	Codemasters		1989	^{[a]}
Super Trolley	Mastertronic		1988	
Super Trux	Elite Systems		1988	^{[a]}
Superbike Trans-Am	Codemasters		1989	
Superdeflex	Llamasoft		1982	^{[zx]}
Superkid	Atlantis Software		1989	^{[a]}
Superkid in Space	Atlantis Software		1990	^{[a]}
Superleague Soccer	Impressions Games		1990	^{[a]}
Superman: The Game	Telecomsoft	First Star Software, DC Comics	1986	
Superman: The Man of Steel	Tynesoft	First Star Software, DC Comics	1989	
Supersports	Gremlin Graphics		1988	
SuperTed: The Search for Spot	Alternative Software	Siriol Animation/Mike Young	1990	^{[a]}
Super Wonder Boy to Monster Land	Activision	Sega	1989	
Survivor	U.S. Gold	Topo Soft	1987	^{[a]}
Survivors	Atlantis Software		1986	^{[a]}
Sweevo's World	Gargoyle Games		1986	^{[a]}
Switchblade	Gremlin Graphics		1991	^{[a]}
SWIV	Storm Software		1991	
Sword of the Samurai	Zeppelin Games		1992	^{[a]}
Sword Slayer	Players Software		1988	^{[a]}
Swords and Sorcery	Personal Software Services		1985	^{[a]}
Syntax	Blue Ribbon Software		1989	^{[a]}
System 15000	Craig Communications		1984	^{[a]}
T-Bird	Mastertronic Plus		1989	^{[a]}
Table Football	Budgie Budget Software		1987	
Tai Chi Tortoise	Zeppelin Games		1991	
Tai-Pan	Ocean Software		1987	
Tales of the Arabian Nights	Interceptor Micros		1985	
Talisman	Games Workshop		1985	
Tanium	Players Software		1988	^{[a]}
Tank Attack	CDS Micro Systems		1988	^{[a]}
Tank Command	Atlantis Software		1988	^{[a]}
Tapper	U.S. Gold	Bally Midway	1985	^{[a]}
Target	Martech		1989	
Target Plus	Dinamic Software		1988	
Target: Renegade	Imagine Software		1988	^{[a]}
Tarzan Goes Ape	Codemasters		1991	^{[a]}
Task Force	Players Premier Software		1989	^{[a]}
Tau Ceti	CRL Group		1985	^{[a]}
Technician Ted	Hewson Consultants		1984	^{[a]}
Techno Cop	Gremlin Graphics		1988	^{[a]}
Teenage Mutant Hero Turtles	Image Works	Mirage Studios	1990	^{[a]}
Teenage Mutant Ninja Turtles – The Coin-Op	Image Works	Konami	1991	^{[a]}
Teladon	Destiny Software		1988	^{[a]}
Tempest	Electric Dreams Software	Atari	1987	
Temple of Terror	U.S. Gold	Puffin Books	1987	^{[a]}
Ten Pin Challenge	Atlantis Software		1987	
Terminator 2: Judgment Day	Ocean Software	Carolco Pictures	1991	^{[a]}
Terminus: The Prison Planet	Mastertronic Added Dimension		1986	
Terra Cresta	Imagine Software	Nichibutsu	1986	
Terramex	Grandslam Entertainment		1988	
Terror-Daktil 4-D	Melbourne House		1983	
Terrormolinos	Melbourne House		1985	^{[a]}
Terrorpods	Melbourne House	Psygnosis	1989	^{[a]}
Test Master	E&J Software		1988	
Tetris	Mirrorsoft		1988	^{[a]}
Thanatos	Durell Software		1986	
The A-Team	Zafiro Software Division	NBC	1988	
Addams Family, The	Ocean Software	Paramount Pictures	1992	
Amazing Spider-Man and Captain America in Dr. Doom's Revenge!, The	Empire Software	Marvel Comics	1989	
Arc of Yesod, The	Odin Computer Graphics		1985	^{[a]}
Astonishing Adventures of Mr. Weems and the She Vampires, The	Piranha Software		1987	
Bard's Tale, The	Electronic Arts		1988	
The Battle of the Bulge	Cases Computer Simulations		1990	
The Birds and the Bees	Bug-Byte		1983	
Birds and the Bees II: Antics, The	Bug-Byte		1984	
Biz, The	Virgin Games		1984	^{[a]}
The Black Hole	Fantasy Software		1983	
Boggit, The	CRL Group		1986	^{[a]}
The Bounty Hunter	Codemasters		1989	^{[a]}
The Boxer	Cult Games		1990	
The Brick	Delta Software		1989	
The Champ	Linel		1991	
Chessmaster 2000, The	Dro Soft	The Software Toolworks	1990	
The Colditz Story	Atlantis Software		1987	
Colour of Magic, The	Piranha Software	Terry Pratchett	1986	^{[a]}
The Count	Mirrorsoft		1985	
Curse of Sherwood, The	Mastertronic		1987	
Cycles: International Grand Prix Racing, The	Accolade		1989	^{[a]}
Dam Busters	U.S. Gold		1985	^{[a]}
The Damned Forest	Cult Games		1988	
The Deep	U.S. Gold	Cream Corp	1988	^{[a]}
The Double	Scanatron		1986	^{[a]}
The Duct	Gremlin Graphics		1988	
Duel: Test Drive II, The	Accolade		1989	
Dukes of Hazzard, The	Elite Systems		1985	
Dungeon Master, The	Crystal Computing		1983	^{[zx]}
Eidolon, The	Activision	Lucasfilm Games	1986	^{[a]}
Evil Dead, The	Palace Software	Renaissance Pictures	1984	
Famous Five, The	Enigma Variations	Enid Blyton	1990	
The Fifth Quadrant	Bubble Bus Software		1987	
Flintstones, The	Grandslam Entertainment	Hanna-Barbera	1988	
The Footballer	Cult Games		1989	
Fourth Protocol, The	Hutchinson Computer Publishing	Frederick Forsyth	1985	^{[a]}
Fury, The	Martech		1988	^{[a]}
The Games: Summer Edition	U.S. Gold	Epyx	1989	^{[a]}
The Games: Winter Edition	U.S. Gold	Epyx	1988	^{[a]}
The General: Warfare in the Napoleonic Era	Cases Computer Simulations		1989	
Goonies, The	U.S. Gold		1986	^{[a]}
Great Escape, The	Ocean Software		1986	^{[a]}
Great Space Race, The	Legend		1984	^{[a]}
Guild of Thieves, The	Rainbird Software		1988	^{[a]}
The Hit Squad	Codemasters		1988	^{[a]}
The Hobbit	Melbourne House	J. R. R. Tolkien	1982	^{[zx]}
Hunt for Red October, The	Grandslam Entertainment	Tom Clancy	1988	^{[a]}
Hunt for Red October, The (film tie-in)	Grandslam Entertainment	Paramount Pictures	1991	^{[a]}
Island, The	Crystal Computing		1983	
The Island of Dr. Destructo	Bulldog		1987	
Jetsons: Cogswell's Caper!, The	Hi-Tec Software	Hanna-Barbera	1992	^{[a]}
The Kingdom of Krell	Anco Software		1987	
Last Mission, The	Opera Soft		1987	^{[a]}
The Last Vampire	Atlantis Software		1990	^{[a]}
The Legend of Kage	Imagine Software	Taito	1987	^{[a]}
Light Corridor, The	Infogrames		1991	^{[a]}
Living Daylights, The	Domark		1987	
Lords of Midnight, The	Beyond Software		1984	^{[a]}
The Match	Cult Games		1991	^{[a]}
Muncher, The	Gremlin Graphics	Chewits	1988	^{[a]}
The Munsters	Again Again		1989	^{[a]}
The National	D&H Games		1988	
The NeverEnding Story II	Linel	Warner Bros.	1990	
New Zealand Story, The	Ocean Software	Taito	1989	^{[a]}
Ninja Warriors, The	Virgin Games	Taito	1989	^{[a]}
The Official Father Christmas Game	Alternative Software		1989	^{[a]}
Paranoia Complex, The	Gremlin Graphics		1989	^{[a]}
The Pawn	Rainbird Software		1987	^{[a]}
Plot, The	Firebird Software		1988	^{[a]}
Price of Magik, The	Level 9		1986	^{[a]}
The Prince	Cases Computer Simulations		1984	
The Pyramid	Fantasy Software		1983	^{[zx]}
The Race	Players Premier Software		1990	
Race Against Time, The	Codemasters	Sport Aid	1988	^{[a]}
The Rats	Hodder & Stoughton	James Herbert	1985	^{[a]}
The Real Ghostbusters	Activision	Data East	1989	^{[a]}
The Real Stunt Experts	Alternative Software		1989	
The Rocky Horror Show	CRL Group		1985	
The Runes of Zendos	Dorcas Software		1984	
The Running Man	Grandslam Entertainment	TAFT Entertainment Pictures	1989	^{[a]}
The Sacred Armour of Antiriad	Palace Software		1986	^{[a]}
The Secret of St. Brides	St Bride's School		1985	^{[a]}
The Sentinel	Firebird Software		1987	^{[a]}
The Shoe People	First Class	ITV	1992	^{[a]}
Simpsons: Bart vs. the Space Mutants, The	Ocean Software	20th Century Fox	1991	^{[a]}
The Snow Queen	Mosaic Publishing		1986	^{[a]}
Spy Who Loved Me, The	Domark	United Artists/Eon Productions	1990	^{[a]}
The Stainless Steel Rat Saves the World	Mosaic Publishing		1984	
Thompson Twins Adventure, The	Computer and Video Games	Thompson Twins	1984	
Tinderbox, The	Gremlin Graphics		1985	
The Train Game	Microsphere		1983	^{[zx]}
The Train: Escape to Normandy	Electronic Arts	Artech Digital Entertainment	1988	
The Transformers	Ocean Software	Hasbro	1986	^{[a]}
The Trap Door	Piranha Software	CMTB Animation/Queensgate Productions	1986	
The Untouchables	Ocean Software	Paramount Pictures	1989	^{[a]}
The Very Big Cave Adventure	CRL Group		1986	^{[a]}
The Vindicator	Imagine Software		1988	^{[a]}
The War of the Worlds	CRL Group	Jeff Wayne	1984	
The Warlock of Firetop Mountain	Puffin Books		1984	
The Way of the Exploding Fist	Melbourne House		1985	^{[a]}
The Way of the Tiger	Gremlin Graphics Software Limited		1986	^{[a]}
The Way of the Tiger: Avenger	Gremlin Graphics Software Limited		1986	^{[a]}
The Wild Bunch	Firebird Software		1984	^{[a]}
The Wombles	Alternative Software	Elisabeth Beresford/FilmFair	1990	^{[a]}
The Worm in Paradise	Level 9		1985	^{[a]}
The Wrath of Magra	Carnell Software		1984	
The Young Ones	Orpheus Ltd		1987	^{[a]}
Theatre Europe	Personal Software Services		1986	
Their Finest Hour	Century Communications		1985	
Them	Pirate Software		1988	
They Stole a Million	39 Steps		1985	
Thing!	Players Software		1988	^{[a]}
Thomas the Tank Engine and Friends	Alternative Software	The Britt Allcroft Company	1991	^{[a]}
Thor	Proein Soft Line		1988	
Three Weeks in Paradise	Mikro-Gen		1986	^{[a]}
Throne of Fire	Melbourne House		1987	^{[a]}
Thrust	Firebird Software		1986	
Thrusta	Software Projects		1985	
Thunder Blade	U.S. Gold	Sega	1988	^{[a]}
Thunderbirds	Grandslam Entertainment	Gerry Anderson/Incorporated Television Company	1989	^{[a]}
ThunderCats	Elite Systems	Telepictures Corporation, Leisure Concepts	1987	^{[a]}
Tiger Road	Go!	Capcom	1988	^{[a]}
Tilt	Codemasters		1990	^{[a]}
Time Flies	Firebird Software		1988	^{[a]}
Time Machine	Activision	Sega	1990	
Time Out	Zafiro Software Division		1988	
Time Scanner	Activision	Sega	1989	^{[a]}
Time-Gate	Quicksilva		1983	^{[zx]}
Timebomb	CDS Micro Systems		1984	
Times of Lore	Origin Systems		1989	^{[a]}
Tintin on the Moon	Infogrames		1989	^{[a]}
Tir Na Nog	Gargoyle Games		1984	^{[a]}
Titan	Titus Software		1989	
Titanic	Topo Soft		1988	
Titanic Blinky	Zeppelin Games		1991	^{[a]}
T.A.N.K.	Ocean Software		1987	
Tobruk: The Clash of Armour	Personal Software Services		1987	
Toi Acid Game	Iber Software	Panrico	1989	
Tokyo Gang	G.LL. Software		1990	
Tom & Jerry 2	Magic Bytes	Hanna-Barbera	1989	
Tomahawk	Digital Integration		1985	
Tomcat	Players Software		1989	^{[a]}
Toobin'	Domark	Tengen/Atari	1989	^{[a]}
Top Cat in Beverly Hills Cats	Hi-Tec Software	Hanna-Barbera	1991	^{[a]}
Top Gun	Ocean Software	Paramount Pictures	1986	
Tornado ECR	Codemasters		1991	
Tornado Low Level	Vortex Software		1984	^{[a]}
Total Eclipse	Incentive Software		1988	^{[a]}
Total Eclipse 2: The Sphinx Jinx	Incentive Software		1991	
Total Recall	Ocean Software	Columbia TriStar Pictures	1991	^{[a]}
Tour 91	Topo Soft		1991	
Tour de Force	Gremlin Graphics		1988	
Tower of Despair	Games Workshop		1984	
Tower of Light	Caris Software		1989	
Toy Bizarre	Activision		1985	^{[a]}
Toyota Celica GT Rally	Gremlin Graphics	Toyota	1991	^{[a]}
Track & Field	Ocean Software	Konami	1988	
Tracksuit Manager	Goliath Games		1988	^{[a]}
Trailblazer	Gremlin Graphics		1986	
Transmuter	Codemasters		1987	
Trantor: The Last Stormtrooper	Go!		1987	^{[a]}
Tranz Am	Ultimate Play the Game		1983	
Trap	Alligata		1987	
Trashman	New Generation Software		1984	^{[a]}
Traxx	Quicksilva		1983	^{[zx]}
TRAZ	Cascade Games		1989	^{[a]}
Treasure Island	Mr. Micro		1984	
Treasure Island Dizzy	Codemasters		1989	^{[a]}
Treble Champions	E&J Software		1989	
Trevor Brooking's World Cup Glory	Challenge Software	Trevor Brooking	1990	^{[a]}
Triaxos	39 Steps		1987	
Triple Comando	Dro Soft		1988	
Trivial Pursuit: A New Beginning	Domark	Horn Abbot International	1988	^{[a]}
Troll	Kixx		1988	
Tuareg	Topo Soft		1988	
Tujad	Ariolasoft/Dro Soft		1986	
Turbo Boat Simulator	Silverbird Software		1988	
Turbo Cup	Loriciels	René Metge	1989	
Turbo Esprit	Durell Software	Lotus Cars	1986	
Turbo Girl	Dinamic Software		1988	
Turbo Kart Racer	Players Software		1991	
Turbo Outrun	U.S. Gold	Sega	1989	^{[a]}
Turbo Skate Fighter	Zeppelin Games		1989	
Turbo the Tortoise	Hi-Tec Software		1992	^{[a]}
Turmoil	Bug-Byte		1984	^{[a]}
Turrican	Rainbow Arts		1990	^{[a]}
Turrican II: The Final Fight	Rainbow Arts		1991	^{[a]}
Tusker	System 3		1989	
Twin Kingdom Valley	Bug-Byte		1984	
Twin Turbo V8	Codemasters		1989	^{[a]}
Twinworld	Ubisoft		1990	^{[a]}
Twister	System 3		1986	
U.N. Squadron	U.S. Gold	Capcom	1990	^{[a]}
Uchi Mata	Martech	Brian Jacks	1987	^{[a]}
Ulises	Opera Soft		1989	
Underground	System 4		1988	
Underwurlde	Ultimate Play the Game		1984	
Universal Hero	Mastertronic		1986	^{[a]}
Up for Grabs	Summit Software		1988	
Urban Upstart	Richard Shepherd Software		1983	^{[a]}
Uridium	Hewson Consultants		1986	^{[a]}
Valhalla	Legend		1983	
Vampire Village	Terminal Software		1983	
Vampire's Empire	Gremlin Graphics		1988	
Vectorball	Mastertronic Added Dimension		1988	
Vegas Jackpot	Mastertronic		1984	
Vendetta	System 3		1990	
Venom	Mastertronic		1988	^{[a]}
Viaje al centro de la Tierra	Topo Soft		1989	
Victory Road	Imagine Software	SNK	1989	
Vigilante	U.S. Gold	Irem	1989	^{[a]}
Viking Raiders	Firebird Software		1984	^{[a]}
Vikings	Challenge Software		1989	^{[a]}
Vindicators	Domark	Tengen/Atari	1989	^{[a]}
Violent Universe	Fantasy Software		1983	
Virus	Firebird Software		1988	^{[a]}
Vixen	Martech		1988	^{[a]}
Viz: The Game	Virgin Games	John Brown Group	1991	^{[a]}
Volcanic Dungeon	Carnell Software		1983	^{[zx]}
Volcano	Computer Magic		1985	
Voodoo Castle	Adventure International		1984	
Voyage into the Unknown	Mastertronic		1984	
Vulcan: The Tunisian Campaign	Cases Computer Simulations		1987	^{[a]}
W.A.R.	Martech		1986	^{[a]}
Wacky Darts	Codemasters		1991	^{[a]}
Wacky Racers	Hi-Tec Software		1992	
Wanderer	Elite Systems		1989	^{[a]}
Wanted: Monty Mole	Gremlin Graphics		1984	
War Game	Abbex Electronics		1984	
War in Middle Earth	Melbourne House	JRR Tolkien	1989	^{[a]}
War Machine	Players Premier Software		1989	
War of the Roses	Cases Computer Simulations		1991	^{[a]}
Warlock	The Edge		1988	
Waxworks	Digital Fantasia		1983	
WEC Le Mans	Imagine Software	Konami/Automobile Club de l'Ouest	1988	^{[a]}
Wellington at Waterloo	Cases Computer Simulations		1989	^{[a]}
Wells & Fargo	Topo Soft		1988	
Welltris	Infogrames	Bullet-Proof Software	1991	^{[a]}
Wembley Greyhounds	D&H Games		1988	
Werewolf Simulator	Top Ten Software		1988	
Werewolves of London	Mastertronic		1989	^{[a]}
West Bank	Dinamic Software		1985	
Wheelie	Microsphere		1983	
Where Time Stood Still	Ocean Software		1988	^{[a]}
White Heat	Codemasters		1987	
Who Dares Wins II	Alligata		1986	^{[a]}
Wibstars	A&F Software		1987	
Wild Streets	Titus Software		1990	^{[a]}
Wild West Seymour	Codemasters		1992	
Wildwater	Bug-Byte		1989	
William Wobbler	Wizard		1986	^{[a]}
Winged Warlords	CDS Micro Systems		1983	
Winter Games	U.S. Gold	Epyx	1986	
Winter Olympiad '88	Tynesoft		1988	^{[a]}
Wiz-Biz	Alternative Software		1987	
Wizard Warz	Go!		1988	^{[a]}
Wizard Willy	Cartoon Time		1990	^{[a]}
Wizards Spell	IJK Software		1986	
Wizball	Ocean Software		1987	^{[a]}
Wolfan	Bulldog		1987	
Wolfman	CRL Group		1988	
Wonder Boy	Activision	Sega	1987	^{[a]}
World Championship Boxing Manager	Goliath Games		1990	^{[a]}
World Championship Soccer	Elite Systems	Sega	1991	^{[a]}
World Class Leader Board	U.S. Gold		1987	^{[a]}
World Cup Rugby	Audiogenic Software		1991	^{[a]}
World Cricket	Zeppelin Games		1991	^{[a]}
World Cup	Cult Games		1992	^{[a]}
World Cup Carnival	U.S. Gold	Artic Computing, FIFA	1986	^{[a]}
World Cup Challenge	Players Premier Software		1990	^{[a]}
World Cup Soccer: Italia '90	Virgin Games	FIFA	1990	^{[a]}
World Games	U.S. Gold	Epyx	1987	^{[a]}
World of Soccer	Challenge Software		1992	
World Rugby	Zeppelin Games		1993	^{[a]}
World Soccer	Zeppelin Games		1990	
World Soccer League	E&J Software		1989	
Worse Things Happen at Sea	Silversoft		1984	^{[a]}
Wrestling Superstars	Codemasters		1993	^{[a]}
Wriggler	Romantic Robot		1985	^{[a]}
Wulfpack	Blue Ribbon Software		1989	^{[a]}
WWF WrestleMania	Ocean Software	World Wrestling Federation	1991	^{[a]}
X-Out	Rainbow Arts		1990	^{[a]}
Xadom	Quicksilva		1983	^{[a]}^{[zx]}
Xanagrams	Postern Ltd.		1983	^{[a]}
Xarax	Firebird Software		1988	^{[a]}
Xecutor	ACE Software		1987	^{[a]}
Xeno	A'n'F Software		1986	^{[a]}
Xenon	Melbourne House	Bitmap Brothers	1988	^{[a]}
Xenophobe	Micro Style	Bally Midway	1989	^{[a]}
Xevious	U.S. Gold	Namco	1987	^{[a]}
XOR	Logotron		1987	
Xybots	Domark	Tengen/Atari	1989	^{[a]}
Yabba Dabba Doo!	Quicksilva	Hanna-Barbera Productions	1986	^{[a]}
Yenght	Dinamic Software		1984	
Yes, Prime Minister	Mosaic Publishing		1987	^{[a]}
Yeti	Destiny Software		1988	^{[a]}
Yie Ar Kung-Fu	Imagine Software	Konami	1985	^{[a]}
Yie Ar Kung-Fu II	Imagine Software	Konami	1986	
Yogi Bear	Piranha Software		1987	^{[a]}
Yogi Bear & Friends: The Greed Monster	Hi-Tec Software	Hanna-Barbera	1990	^{[a]}
Yogi's Great Escape	Hi-Tec Software	Hanna-Barbera	1990	^{[a]}
Yomp	Virgin Games		1983	^{[zx]}
Zaxxon	U.S. Gold	Sega	1985	
Zenji	Activision		1984	^{[a]}
Zig Zag	DK'Tronics		1984	^{[a]}
Zip Zap	Imagine Software		1983	
Zoids: The Battle Begins	Martech	Tomy	1985	^{[a]}
Zolyx	Firebird Software		1988	^{[a]}
Zombi	Ubisoft		1990	^{[a]}
Zombie Zombie	Quicksilva		1984	^{[a]}
Zona 0	Topo Soft		1991	
Zone Trooper	Cascade Games		1989	
Zorro	U.S. Gold		1986	
Zub	Mastertronic		1986	^{[a]}
Zulu Wars	Cascade Games		1987	
Zybex	Zeppelin Games		1989	
Zynaps	Hewson Consultants		1987	^{[a]}
Zzoom	Imagine Software		1983	
