= Peter Pan (video game) =

1984 video game

- Publisher: Hodder & Stoughton
- Designer: N.D. Head
- Release: 1984
- Genre: Adventure

Peter Pan is a 1984 video game published by Hodder & Stoughton based on the J.M. Barrie play and novel Peter Pan.

== Gameplay ==
Peter Pan is a game in which the player controls Peter Pan, encountering characters such as Captain Hook, Wendy, Tinker Bell, the crocodile, the Indians and the pirates.

== Reception ==
Bill Hoare reviewed Peter Pan for Imagine magazine, and stated: "All in all, Peter Pan is an excellent Adventure which should appeal especially to the younger enthusiast and as such it is to be highly recommended."

== See also ==
- List of ZX Spectrum games
- List of works based on Peter Pan
