= Play for Your Life =

1988 video game

- Developer: Ocean Software
- Publisher: Your Sinclair
- Designers: Dusko Dimitrijevic; Dragoljub Andjelkovic
- Platform: ZX Spectrum
- Release: 1988
- Genre: Action
- Mode: Single-player

Play For Your Life is an isometric action game produced by Ocean for the ZX Spectrum and published by Your Sinclair as a cover tape game in 1988. The game is a simulation of a futuristic tennis-like sport played by robots with bats in an enclosed room.

== Gameplay ==
The player controls a robot with a bat attempting to hit a ball at a circular target on the opposing wall. Alternatively, the player may try to kill the opponent by hitting it with the ball or bat. The computer-controlled opposing player is trying to do the same.

As the game progresses more balls are brought into play, up to a limit of four. A round is won when one player scores three goals or kills the opponent.

There are 26 levels of varying difficulty. Later levels feature movable barriers and various other obstacles to complicate play.
