= The Great Space Race =

1984 video game

- Cover art
- Developer: Legend
- Publisher: Legend
- Platform: ZX Spectrum
- Release: EU: 1984
- Genre: Interactive fiction
- Mode: Single-player

The Great Space Race is a ZX Spectrum space-based combat and adventure game published in 1984 by British studio Legend.

== Gameplay ==
The Great Space Race is a combination role-playing game and science-fiction space combat game. The basic premise of the game is that a new super-drink called Natof has been discovered. Natof has three key properties, which are to get the person drunk, never leave him with a hangover, and supply him with all the nutrition required from a well-balanced (if never sober) diet.

The name Natof is a portmanteau of the phrase "NAme TO Follow" - the sentence sent with the first batch of miracle drink by the discoverer.

The manual describes the game as "a true computer movie. The player can just watch events unfold, joining in as much or as little as he wishes." The objective is "to deliver, to the space stations as much Natof as the player can, as fast as he can." The game will play itself if left alone — indeed the computer generally makes a better player than a human does — although that rather defeats the point of the game.

== Development ==
The publishing house Legend was also known as Microl/Legend, and earlier as simply Microl. Legend's chairman and founder was John Peel. The developers of The Great Space Race credited in the instruction manual are David Ashe, Graham Asher, Martin Carty, Karl Curtis, Richard Edwards, Trevor Inns, Declan Kirk, James Learmont, Adrian Marler, Bruce Menzie, Peter Moxham, Andrew Owen, Jan Peel, and John Peel. The publisher claimed an investment of £250,000 for the title.

== Reception ==
The Great Space Race was anticipated as the follow-up to Legend's graphic adventure Valhalla. Pre-release publicity boasted that the game contained "technical effects never before seen in home computer software", with "true solid 3D graphics". The game was largely coded in BASIC.

After its release, the game was described by Sinclair User as "one of the most vacuous products we have seen." The graphics also did not impress, as Big K magazine panned "Graphics are great - by 1982 standards. In 1985 they look amateurish and unprofessional". More recent retrospective reviews (c.2010s) confirm The Great Space Race as a poor product that was greatly over-hyped.
