= Great Britain Ltd =

1982 video game

- Publisher: Simon Hessel
- Designer: Simon Hessel
- Platform: ZX81 ZX Spectrum BBC Micro
- Release: EU: 1982
- Genre: Government simulation
- Mode: Single-player

Great Britain Ltd (also known as GBLtd) is a British nation-simulation game originally released in 1982 for the BBC Micro, ZX81 and ZX Spectrum. The game was written and published by Simon W Hessel.

The game provides a simple government simulation, allowing the player to manage the British economy and compete in elections every 5 years. The player takes on the role of leader of one of the major parties, managing variables such as tax rates and welfare payments, which each year results in changes to key economic indicators such as inflation and unemployment.

These changes also impact the player's popularity, making it easier or harder to win subsequent elections. After winning an election, the player is allowed another 5 years to manage the economy before another election is held.
