= Olli & Lissa =

- Genre: Action
- First release: 1987
- Latest release: 1989

Olli & Lissa is a series of three action video games: Olli & Lissa: The Ghost of Shilmore Castle (1987), Olli & Lissa II: Halloween (1987), and Olli & Lissa 3: The Candlelight Adventure (1989).

== Plot and gameplay ==
The games see the protagonist duo Olli & Lissa solve a mystery. The titles play as flip-screen games.

== Commercial performance ==
The titles became significantly successful as budget games. The first in the series was the UK's top-selling ZX Spectrum game in January 1987.

== Critical reception ==
=== The Ghost of Shilmore Castle ===
Reception

Award
Publication	Award
Your Sinclair	YS Megagame

CVG Magazine praised the title as being both addictive and humorous. Commodore User Magazine thought the title was a fine example of the developer's good "cheapo games".

=== The Candlelight Adventure ===
Reception

Award
Publication	Award
Crash	Crash Smash

Commodore Format Magazine felt the game exuded originality and style. ZZap!64 Magazine felt the graphics were imaginative and varied.
