= Titanic (video game) =

- Developer: Topo Soft
- Publisher: Topo Soft
- Programmer: Emilio Martínez Tejedor
- Artist: Ricardo Cancho
- Composer: César Astudillo
- Platforms: ZX Spectrum, Amstrad CPC, MSX, DOS
- Release: September 1988
- Genre: Action-adventure
- Mode: Single-player

Titanic is a 1988 action-adventure video game developed by Topo Soft for the ZX Spectrum, Amstrad CPC, MSX, and DOS. It received mixed reviews upon release, with critics faulting the game's control scheme and level design.

== Gameplay ==
Players explore the wreck of the Titanic and surrounding underwater caves in a high-pressure diving suit. The objective of the game is to navigate the mazelike areas of the level, pressing switches to open doors, in order to locate and extract treasure. Hazards include marine life including fish, squid, and sharks, which can be defeated using a limited supply of harpoons. Colliding with them depletes oxygen, which when empty, causes a game over and the level to restart; tanks to replenish oxygen can be located throughout the level. Titanic features a password save system, with passwords provided to players at the completion of each level.

== Development ==
Titanic was released by Spanish developer Topo Soft, and announced in August 1988 alongside Chicago's 30 and Emilio Butragueño Football.

== Reception ==
Reception

Review scores
Publication	Score
ACE	587/1000
Crash	45%
Your Sinclair	5/10

ACE considered Titanic reasonably challenging, but found it short, simple, and its controls a "little haphazard". Describing the game as "woefully short on substance", Your Sinclair critiqued the game's trial and error gameplay, expressing that levels lacked variance in appearance and challenge. Crash critiqued the game's "primitive" graphics and found gameplay to be dull, but considered some may enjoy exploring its large cave system.
