= Head Coach (video game) =

1987 sports video game

- Developer(s): MicroSearch
- Publisher(s): MicroSearch
- Platform(s): Amiga
- Release: 1987
- Genre(s): Sports

Head Coach is a 1987 video game published by MicroSearch.

== Gameplay ==
Head Coach is a game in which fictional football teams and players are represented in a statistics-oriented strategy game.

== Reception ==
Wyatt Lee reviewed the game for Computer Gaming World, and stated that "Minus yardage for this program must focus on the keyboard interface which, while opening up creative possibilities on the one hand, slows down the game on the other. Minus yardage must also be applied for the lack of easily accessible files on real NFL teams."
