= Mrs Mopp =

1984 video game

- Developer: Tina Billett
- Publishers: Computasolve; Atlantis (reissue)
- Platform: ZX Spectrum
- Release: 1984
- Genre: Action
- Mode: Single-player

Mrs Mopp is a video game developed by Tina Billett for the 48K ZX Spectrum published by Computasolve in 1984. It was re-released by Atlantis Software as the punctuated Mrs. Mopp. The player takes the role of a housewife trying to keep her kitchen tidy against the best mess-making efforts of her family.

== Gameplay ==
Title screen

The screen represents a kitchen where Mrs. Mopp moves around. Dirt, cups, glasses and clothes accumulate on the floor, blocking her progress. She must pick up one of the appropriately coloured tools around the room (basket, tray, or dustpan and brush) and use it to collect the mess. When the character sprite flashes, the tool must be emptied into the appropriate part of the kitchen (washing machine, sink, or bin).

When Mrs. Mopp gets tired, she can revive herself by having a swig of sherry. If she drinks too much, she will become tipsy at first (reversed controls), then drunk (random movement).

== Reception ==
Crash gave Mrs Mopp a score of 69% in the magazine's first issue.
