= Volcano (1985 video game) =

1985 video game

- Developer: V.K. Hiam
- Publisher: Computer Magic
- Platform: ZX Spectrum
- Release: EU: 1985
- Genre: Action-adventure
- Mode: Single-player

Volcano, also known as Volcano - The Action Game, is a 1985 action-adventure game developed by V.K. Hiam and published by Computer Magic for the ZX Spectrum 48K.

== Gameplay ==
The game's objective is to escape a city threatened by an erupting volcano. Players control a crudely drawn character, depicted as a pair of animated feet, navigating through a large maze-like environment consisting of both above-ground and underground levels.

The game world is divided into two main parts. The above-ground portion features a bird's-eye view of maze-like streets, comprising forty screens. The city is divided into various districts, including medieval, commercial, and shopping sections. Players must navigate through the city, avoiding dangerous paths leading into marshes, lava from the erupting volcano, and other hazards. A generic overworld map is provided with the game, but players are encouraged to create their own maps for better navigation. The underground section consists of over 290 screens presented in a wireframe 3D view. Players can access these caverns through certain items found in the overworld. To aid navigation, players are given three matches that temporarily reveal the underground level map, showing the start and exit points but not the current position.

Players start with five lives. The food meter decreases rapidly, and players must collect scarce food resources to stay alive. Losing all food or wandering into swamps results in the loss of a life. Players must collect other useful objects such as dynamite and ropes, which appear randomly throughout the game. The volcano continues to erupt during gameplay, progressively blocking town streets with debris. Dynamite is used to remove boulders that randomly block streets. The game features a single skill level and incorporates random elements, except for the first three screens. Movement controls differ between the two game sections: the above-ground game allows four-way movement, while in the underground section, players can rotate the view left and right and move forward.

The player's score is based on time. The game ends when the player either finds the escape boat or runs out of resources as all paths become blocked.

== Reception ==
Reception

Review scores
Publication	Score
Crash	45%
Computer and Video Games	18/40
Personal Computer Games	4/10
Home Computing Weekly	3/5

Volcano received mixed to negative reviews from contemporary gaming publications. Reviewers generally criticized the game's graphics, playability, and overall appeal.

Several reviewers commented on the game's visual aspects. Computer and Video Games described the graphics as "crude", while Crash noted that they were simple but served their purpose. Home Computing Weekly praised the 3D graphics as "rather fine", particularly in the underground passages, though Personal Computer Games reviewers found them mediocre overall. The use of color was considered average by Crash.

Gameplay was a point of contention among reviewers. Crash described Volcano as a mixture of adventure and strategy that was quite playable but became repetitive, especially in the underground levels. Multiple reviewers expressed frustration with the game, citing issues such as the inability to escape from underground mazes, the rapid appearance of lava blobs, and the limited time to see the underground map. Personal Computer Games reviewers found the game to be slow, amateurish, and lacking in playability.

The game's scope and design were also discussed. Crash noted that Volcano attempted to attract players with a large number of screens to discover, but argued that "sheer size of a program isn't what makes a winner" and that everything the game offered had been seen previously on a smaller scale. Personal Computer Games pointed out that most of the claimed 290 3D screens were views of the same place. Home Computing Weekly expressed disappointment with the game concept and felt it did not live up to the developers' claims.

Reviewers generally agreed that the game lacked lasting appeal and addictiveness. Crash stated that it was "not the sort that make you want to play compulsively", while Personal Computer Games reviewers doubted that many would play the game for more than ten minutes without getting angry. The need for a good memory to navigate the mazes was noted by Crash.
