= Out of the Shadows (video game) =

1984 video game

- Publisher: Mizar Computing
- Designers: R.W. Waller; R.M.R. Woodward
- Platform: ZX Spectrum
- Release: 1984
- Genre: Action-adventure
- Mode: Single-player

Out of the Shadows is an action-adventure game developed for the ZX Spectrum by R.M. Waller and R.M.R. Woodward. It was published in 1984 by Mizar Computing and in 1986 on the compilation Fourmost Adventures by Global Software.

== Reception ==
Reception

Award
Publication	Award
Crash	Smash

Out of the Shadows received a "Crash Smash" from CRASH magazine, who highlighted the novel light and shadow concept and overall complexity of the gameplay.
