= Fantasy Software =

Software company

- Company type: Video game developer and publisher
- Predecessor: Quest Microsoftware
- Founded: 1983
- Defunct: 1985
- Successor: n/a
- Headquarters: Falconberg Lodge, 27A St. Georges Road, Cheltenham, Glos, GL50 3DT, England (Note: Early Fantasy adverts contained a typo with the address as "Fauconberg Lodge" instead of "Falconberg Lodge".)
- Key people: Paul Dyer, Bob Hamilton, Darren Hamilton, Ian Hamilton

Fantasy Software, which started out as Quest Microsoftware, was one of the smaller software companies which produced games for home computers, mainly the ZX Spectrum during the early 1980s. The company was founded in early 1983 by Bob Hamilton and Paul Dyer. It had a number of reasonable successes in the early days of the computer boom but never became one of the major software production houses. Most of its releases were written by Bob Hamilton.

== Released games ==
- The Black Hole (1983) (as Quest)
- Violent Universe (1983) (as Quest)
- The Pyramid (1983) — reviewed in Crash issue 2: 83%
- Doomsday Castle (1983) — reviewed in Crash issue 2: 87%
- Beaky and the Egg Snatchers (1984) — reviewed in Crash issue 7: 75%
- Backpackers Guide to the Universe (1984) — reviewed in Crash issue 12: 83%
- The Drive-In (1984) — reviewed in Crash issue 13: 70%

The Pyramid, Doomsday Castle and Backpackers Guide to the Universe all featured the character "Ziggy" and can be considered sequels to each other. Backpackers Guide to the Universe was intended to be the first part of a trilogy, and originally billed as Backpackers Guide to the Universe Part 1 but Fantasy went bankrupt before subsequent titles could be written.

Backpackers Guide to the Universe was heavily influenced by The Hitchhiker's Guide to the Galaxy, making reference to Foord Perfect and Arthur Dont as well as the number 42. The distributed cassette includes the game itself on side 1, and the eponymous "Backpackers Guide to the Universe" on side 2, which contains useful tips on collecting - and keeping alive - all the creatures in Ziggy's quest.

== History ==
In issue 19 of Crash magazine, they stated that a number of companies owed advertising fees including Fantasy Software, with a debt of £4,190.
