= Jason's Gem =

1985 video game

- Developer: Simon White
- Publisher: Mastertronic
- Platform: ZX Spectrum
- Release: EU: 1985
- Genre: Action
- Mode: Single-player

Jason's Gem is a computer game for the ZX Spectrum. It was published in 1985 by Mastertronic and written by Simon White. The hero Jason must make his way through a series of caves in search of the legendary gem of the title.

The game begins with Jason docking his spaceship on a moving platform. He then descends through rocky caverns blasting away the rocks as he goes. Upon reaching the bottom of the caves he must negotiate a series of platform screens before reaching his goal and attaining glory.
