= Schizofrenia (video game) =

1985 video game

- Publisher: Quicksilva
- Writer: Terry P. Watts
- Platform: Commodore 64

Schizofrenia is a 1985 video game for the ZX Spectrum and Commodore 64 published by the British games publisher Quicksilva.

== Reception ==
Ken McMahon for Commodore User wrote that "Schizo is an infuriatingly addictive game and should provide a challenge for even the most accomplished players." Zzap64 said that "Overall, despite the relatively interesting scenario, Quicksilva must be the ones suffering from mental disoders." Computer and Video Games found it to be "a very frustrating game." Aktueller Software Markt gave it a rating of only 3.
