= Thor (video game) =

- Developer: Proein Soft Line
- Publishers: Proein Soft Line; Global Games
- Designer: Victor Morilla
- Platforms: MSX, ZX Spectrum
- Release: 1988
- Genre: Platformer
- Mode: Single-player

Thor is a 1988 platform video game developed by Victor Morilla and published by Proein Soft Line for the MSX and ZX Spectrum.

== Plot ==
The realm of Asgard is in peril, and only one of its gods possesses the power to save it: Thor, the God of Thunder. The source of this danger is the death of Balder, son of Odin, the god of gods, who was killed by a dagger wrapped in green leaves. But in these kinds of mystical tales, there is always a villain, Loki, who orchestrated this murder after learning of the prophecy: Balder's death would bring about the downfall of the gods, who would be attacked by a pack of rabid wolves without mercy. And that is precisely what our protagonist must prevent.

To do so, he must destroy a series of eggs, where the members of the wolf pack are developing. These eggs are located in a castle (where the game takes place) in the distant lands of Vendha, home to the children of the devil. Surtur jealously guards them, awaiting their arrival. His means of defeating them, as well as other smaller enemies, will be to project lightning bolts at them, strikes from his magic hammer, and of course, his skill with the keyboard.
