= Voyage into the Unknown =

1984 video game

- Cover art
- Developer: Amoeba Software
- Publisher: Mastertronic
- Designer: Tim Steel
- Platform: ZX Spectrum
- Release: EU: 1984
- Genre: Action-adventure
- Mode: Single-player

Voyage into the Unknown is a game released by Mastertronic for the ZX Spectrum in 1984 written by Tim Steel from Amoeba Software.

== Reception ==
CRASH gave its second lowest review score of 1984 to Voyage into the Unknown, with only Kosmik Pirate scoring lower.
