= Viking Raiders =

1984 video game

- Cover art
- Developer: Mark Lucas
- Publisher: Firebird
- Platform: ZX Spectrum
- Release: EU: 1984
- Genre: Turn-based strategy
- Modes: Single-player, multiplayer

Viking Raiders is a computer game developed by Mark Lucas for the ZX Spectrum and released by Firebird in 1984. It can be played by two to four players, both human and computer.

== Gameplay ==
A turn-based strategy, which involves moving boats, men, and catapults to capture the castle of each opponent. Playing pieces can move in any direction up to a distance of nine grid squares in a straight line, obstacles permitting. Collecting extra gold in the game allows players to buy further units.

During the game, winter sets in and freezes over ever increasing sections of water, which in turn can trap the players' boats. To win the game the player must defeat all opponents by attacking their castles, which may take several attempts. When a castle is captured, the defeated player's units are transferred to the victor. Players also have to be wary of hazards such as drinking horns; men who drink these move around the playing area erratically, fighting any units they encounter, but may be captured by an opposing army. However, the drunk Vikings also have a random 'invincibility' about them, which can occasionally lead to one of them - laden with Dutch courage - taking out most of an opposition army.
