= The Runes of Zendos =

1984 video game

- Developer: Dorcas Software
- Publisher: Dorcas Software
- Platform: ZX Spectrum
- Release: 1984
- Genre: Action-adventure

The Runes of Zendos is a 1984 action adventure game developed and published by Dorcas Software for the ZX Spectrum. It is the sequel to The Oracle's Cave.

== Gameplay ==
The Runes of Zendos is a game in which the merry principality of Dorcasia is conquered by the evil wizard of Zendos, and the player must rescue the twelve months that the wizard has trapped in a hidden hourglass.

== Reception ==
Reception

Award
Publication	Award
Crash	Smash!

D J Robinson reviewed The Runes of Zendos for Imagine magazine, and stated that "Runes of Zendos is one step beyond Dorcas' last release. By incorporating traditional adventure features with their own unique ideas, they have managed to produce a very good game."

== Reviews ==
- Crash! - Jan, 1985
