= Soccer Star =

Soccer Star is a play-by-mail game published by Pace Games.

== Gameplay ==
Soccer Star is an association football-themed, computer-moderated play-by-mail game in which players manage a team of 14 custom-named players, each rated from 1 (park-level) to 10 (world-class), and compete in one or more of 15 available league or cup competitions. After submitting team selections, players receive weekly result sheets detailing match outcomes, attendance, statistics like corners and bookings, and updated league tables. The game includes realistic features such as a transfer market, fluctuating attendance, and player suspensions. Strict deadlines mean missed turns can be problematic.

== Publication history ==
A promotional offer was extended to Adventurer readers for discounted entry and a free first turn in Soccer Star. DMW and Sherwood offered the game in the United Kingdom as of 1996.

== Reception ==
Wayne Bootleg reviewed Soccer Star for Adventurer magazine and stated that "On the whole, the game is simple to play, easy to understand and enjoyable, but the more tactically minded of you would find that it lacks a real mental challenge." Nigel Smith reviewed the game in the January–February 1996 issue of Flagship, giving it a "thumbs down" overall. He juxtaposed it with the more "interesting" United-style football games. He offered that there are "several reasonably playable aspects to the game and the game design itself isn't that bad", but also stated, "I would only recommend it to those managers more interested in buying and selling players than in devising winning strategies."

== Reviews ==
- Nigel Smith points to a favorable review in this issue of Flagship in his review in issue No. 59.
