= Mantronix (video game) =

1986 video game

- Developer: Syrox Developments
- Publisher: Probe Software
- Platform: ZX Spectrum
- Release: 1986
- Genre: Action-adventure
- Mode: Single-player

Mantronix is an isometric action-adventure game released by Probe in 1986 for the ZX Spectrum.

== Plot ==
The year is 2001 A.D. and four planetary criminals are hiding from the law on the planet Zybor. The bounty hunter robot "Mantronix" has been sent to find and eliminate them.

== Gameplay ==
The player controls the Mantronix in its hunt for the four fugitives on the planet Zybor. The Mantronix must also find eight power cubes, necessary to drive the conveyor belts on the planetary surface, and also as fuel for the homeward flight. "Pulsators"—the life source of the fugitives—must also be destroyed. The criminals are protected by robots which are programmed to attack the Mantronix. The Mantronix is armed with a laser to defend itself and carry out its mission.

== Reception ==
ZX Computing: "Mantronix puts less emphasis on problem-solving than the Ultimate games, but it is a good tricky shoot 'em up, with a large playing area that should keep your trigger finger flexing for a long time."
