= Crete 1941 =

Crete 1941 is a 1976 war video game published by Excalibre Games.

== Gameplay ==
Crete 1941 is a game in which the German invasion of the island of Crete is depicted.

== Reception ==
Charles Vasey reviewed Crete 1941 in Perfidious Albion #10 (October 1976) and stated that "Worth getting if you are a collector."
