= Father of Darkness =

1984 video game

- Developer: Central Solutions
- Publisher: Central Solutions
- Designer: S.E. Roberts
- Engine: The Quill
- Platform: ZX Spectrum
- Release: 1984
- Genre: Graphic adventure

Father of Darkness is a graphic adventure by Central Solutions published for the ZX Spectrum in 1984. The game is controlled by entering textual commands.

The plot involves Hitler taking possession of the sword of Excalibur during the time of King Arthur, with Merlin sending the player forward in time to the 1940s to defeat Hitler and retrieve the sword.
