= Skatin' USA =

- Developer: Graham D. Shaw
- Publisher: Atlantis Software
- Platforms: ZX Spectrum, Amstrad CPC, Commodore 64
- Release: 1990
- Genre: Action
- Mode: Single-player

Skatin' USA is an action video game developed by Graham D. Shaw and published by Atlantis Software in 1990 for the ZX Spectrum. Versions were also released for the Amstrad CPC and Commodore 64.

== Gameplay ==
The player controls Tom Essex, a funny skateboarder who has lost his superpowers. Tom Essex was previously known as Superkid. Now he has to fight street gangs in New York using his skateboard and a catapult.

The game has six stages. Tom has to fight against bikers and gang members and can use his fire catapult to defeat them. Contact with enemies depletes Tom's energy, but hamburgers and fruit can be collected to replenish it. Skating over banana skins temporarily increases his speed.

To complete each stage, the player has to collect dollar bills which illuminate the letters of the SKATIN' USA sign. When the entire sign is fully lit, Tom can proceed to the exit. After completing a stage, the player enters a bonus stage where additional points can be earned within a time limit.

== Release ==
The ZX Spectrum version was published by Atlantis Software in 1990 and priced at £2.99.

== Reception ==
Your Sinclair reviewed Skatin' USA in its December 1990 issue, awarding the game a score of 82%. Crash gave the game a score of 79%.
