= Amazônia (video game) =

- Developer: Renato Degiovani
- Publisher: JVA Microcomputadores Ltda
- Designer: Renato Degiovani
- Platforms: Sinclair ZX81; ZX Spectrum; TRS-80; MSX
- Release: Sinclair ZX81, TRS-80 and ZX Spectrum; 1985; MSX; 1986
- Genres: Text adventure game Point-and-click adventure game
- Mode: Single-player

Amazônia is a Brazilian 1983 text adventure computer game developed by Renato Degiovani. It was the first commercial computer game developed in Brazil.

== Overview ==
The player character, having crashed his plane in the Amazon forest, has to escape the jungle. Through text commands, the player navigates their way through the Amazon, avoiding dangers (jaguars, snakes, Indigenous tribes).

== History ==
Its first version, named Aventuras na Selva (Jungle Adventures) was compiled in BASIC, had 16kb of data; its type-in program was released in the magazine Micro Sistemas, issue n. 23 (August 1983), for ZX81 computers.

The magazine quickly sold out. In 1985 the game was redeveloped in Assembly for TRS-80 and ZX Spectrum computers, now renamed as Amazônia. The game got a MSX version in 1986.

In 1991, Amazônia got a version for PCs, now with a graphical interface.
