= Doc the Destroyer =

1987 RPG video game

- Developer: Beam Software Pty.
- Publisher: Melbourne House
- Designers: Paul Kidd; Geoffrey Evans
- Programmers: Richard Woodcock; Anthony Burkitt
- Artists: David O'Callaghan; Russel Comte
- Platforms: Commodore 64, ZX Spectrum
- Release: UK: 1987
- Genre: Role-playing

Doc the Destroyer is a 1987 role-playing video game for the Commodore 64 and ZX Spectrum. It was published in the United Kingdom by Melbourne House. The game offers keyboard or joystick input for multiple choice adventure.

== Plot ==
The story follows Doc, a time traveller. As Doc is searching for adventure by traveling to different time periods, he stops in Domed City. Doc thinks he'll find some adventure here, but somehow loses his time machine and can't escape from this era. You make decisions for Doc as you help find his long lost machine.

== Reception ==
Reception

Review scores
Publication	Score
Crash	41%
Computer and Video Games	23/30 (64); 21/30 (Spec)
Sinclair User	4/5
Your Sinclair	7/10
Zzap!64	32%
