= Incredible Shrinking Fireman =

1986 video game

The Incredible Shrinking Fireman
- ZX Spectrum cover art
- Developer: Mastertronic Ltd
- Publisher: Mastertronic
- Programmer: Andy Mitchell
- Artist: David Kidd
- Platform: ZX Spectrum
- Release: 1986
- Genre: Platform
- Mode: Single-player

The Incredible Shrinking Fireman is a platform adventure game released for the ZX Spectrum in 1986 by Mastertronic. Programmed by Andy Mitchell with artwork by David Kidd, it was issued as a budget-priced title.

Players control a firefighter who has been accidentally shrunk and must explore a maze-like factory environment to collect components needed to restore his original size. The game combines flip-screen platforming with object-collection and puzzle elements.

Contemporary reviews described the game as an entertaining low-cost release, praising its graphics and value while noting limited difficulty and occasionally confusing gameplay.

== Gameplay ==
ZX Spectrum loading screen featuring the game’s title and protagonist Shuffling Sid

Gameplay showing Sid in the snooker room, one of the domestic environments explored in the factory

The player controls a firefighter known as “Shuffling Sid,” who has been accidentally shrunk while responding to a blaze at a shrinking factory and must recover the five parts of a stretching rack to regain his original size.

The game is presented as a flip-screen platform adventure in which Sid explores a series of interconnected rooms while avoiding enemies and hazards. The game takes place across multiple domestic environments, including rooms such as kitchens, lounges, and a snooker room. Progress requires collecting and using specific objects, many of which unlock new routes or allow passage through obstacles.

Rooms often contain multiple exits that are not immediately obvious, and vertical movement between areas is frequently achieved using fire poles or by jumping through ceilings to reach hidden sections of the complex.

Various everyday items are scattered throughout the factory, including identification cards, keys, watches, and food items. Players can examine objects via an on-screen menu to determine their usefulness, though the correct choices are not always clear. Carrying unnecessary items can hinder progress, encouraging experimentation.

Enemies such as ghosts and ghouls patrol fixed paths and must be avoided. Contact with enemies reduces the player’s energy, though some reviewers noted that they pose only a limited threat.

== Development and release ==
The game was written entirely in Z80 assembly language. Some animation routines, including jumping and landing sequences, are similar to those used in the Mastertronic title Spellbound.

Both principal developers reportedly had fathers who served in the London Fire Brigade, which influenced the game’s theme.

The game sold approximately 58,000 copies, a typical figure for Mastertronic’s budget releases of the period.

== Reception ==
The Incredible Shrinking Fireman received generally mixed to moderately positive reviews from contemporary critics, with praise for its originality and value as a budget title but criticism of limited challenge and sometimes confusing gameplay. Contemporary scores generally fell in the mid-range, around 60–70%.

Computer & Video Games described the premise as amusing and the protagonist “pretty cute,” noting similarities to earlier arcade adventures such as Wally while highlighting the game’s suburban setting. The magazine found the gameplay initially confusing due to unclear movement restrictions and object requirements, but ultimately considered it “quite a nice game,” awarding scores of 6/10 for graphics and sound, 7/10 for value, and 7/10 for playability.

Crash praised the game as a strong release for the budget price range, commending its detailed graphics, effective use of colour, and variety of objects and puzzles. However, the review noted that once players discovered the correct sequence of actions, the challenge diminished, as the ghosts posed little threat. The magazine awarded an overall score of 68%.

Spanish magazine MicroHobby similarly described the game as an enjoyable though modest adventure, highlighting the need to search a large factory for the five components of the stretching machine while avoiding enemies. It praised the technical presentation but characterised the title as simple in scope. The review gave an overall score of 68%.

French publication Tilt considered the game accessible and well suited to beginners, describing it as a straightforward action-adventure set across a large multi-screen factory. While noting that some object requirements could be obscure and that players could become stuck, the magazine judged it an agreeable game overall and awarded it 10/20.

British magazines Your Sinclair and ZX Computing also reviewed the title positively within the context of budget releases. Your Sinclair praised its “cute” graphics and value for money, awarding 7/10, while ZX Computing described it as a passable object-collection adventure with simple but adequate visuals and gave it a rating of 3 out of 5 (“Good”).
