= Psytron =

1984 video game

- Developer: Psy-Sci
- Publisher: Beyond Software
- Platforms: Commodore 64, ZX Spectrum
- Release: 1984

Psytron is a 1984 video game developed by Psy-Sci and published by Beyond Software.

== Gameplay ==
Psytron is a game in which the player is the automated brain controlling the defense and maintenance aboard a space station that is currently under attack.

== Development ==
Psytron was programmed by Paul Voysey and Tayo Olowu.

== Reception ==
Reception

Review score
Publication	Score
Computer and Video Games	30/40

Awards
Publication	Award
Crash	Crash Smash
C&VG	Game of the Month

Carol Hutchins reviewed Psytron for White Dwarf #56, giving it an overall rating of 9 out of 10, and stated that "I found it very exciting and thought that the addition of Freeze Time a very novel twist. I would strongly recommend it to anyone who finds playing wave after wave of identical, invincible opponents is tedious in the extreme."
