= The Stainless Steel Rat Saves the World (video game) =

1984 video game

- Developer: Shards Software
- Publisher: Mosaic Publishing
- Platforms: Commodore 64, ZX Spectrum
- Release: 1984

The Stainless Steel Rat Saves the World is a 1984 video game programmed by Shards Software and published by Mosaic Publishing.

== Gameplay ==
The Stainless Steel Rat Saves the World is a text adventure based on the novel The Stainless Steel Rat Saves the World.

== Reception ==
Dave Langford reviewed The Stainless Steel Rat Saves the World for White Dwarf #61, and stated that "I borrowed two SF/Adventure buffs and watched in awe as they swiftly solved the first challenge (basically, you have to do the obvious thing quickly or get zapped). [...] The second scene halted my trusty suckers. They complained that the wretched program wouldn't let them go anywhere or do anything interesting. They sat admiring its incredibly slow response time, frustrated by the effort to find a command which didn't give 'Try another object/action' or 'You can't do that, Jim/Slippery Jim/James/diGriz/Rat'. . . Eventually the test crew went home, cursing the name of Shards Software (the programmers) and muttering things like 'Harry Harrison should sue'. Perhaps this experience is not typical."
