= Vampire Village =

1983 video game

- Publisher(s): Terminal Software
- Platform(s): ZX Spectrum
- Release: 1983
- Mode(s): Single-player

Vampire Village is a 1983 video game published by Terminal Software.

== Gameplay ==
The game was described as "a real-time graphic adventure" by the publisher. Players assume the role of the Mayor of Vladsdorf, a fictional village on the bank of the River Ripple. Over the river from the village lies the Red Cliffs, above which stands a castle in which a vampire has taken up residence. The farmsteads at the base of the cliff are threatened by the vampire. As the Mayor, the player is tasked with using limited funds to hire volunteers, who must be guided around the village in order to obtain supplies before attempting to cross the river and attack the vampire. Trying to ford the River Ripple without a canoe will result in the volunteer drowning.

The playing screen depicts an overhead view of the village, river and castle. Volunteers are directly controlled and moved into different shops within the village to purchase equipment.
