= GFL Championship Football =

1986 video game

- Publisher: Activision
- Platforms: Amiga, Amstrad CPC, Atari ST, MS-DOS, Commodore 64, ZX Spectrum
- Release: 1986: C64; 1987: CPC, ST, Spectrum; 1988: Amiga
- Genre: Sports

GFL Championship Football is a sports video game published in 1986 by Activision for the Commodore 64. It was converted to the Amstrad CPC, Atari ST, ZX Spectrum, and Amiga. A sequel, GFL Championship Football II, was released for the TRS-80 Color Computer 3 in 1988.

== Gameplay ==
GFL Championship Football is a game in which the player receives a view from inside the helmet.

== Reception ==
Wyatt Lee reviewed the game for Computer Gaming World, and stated that "Whatever one's feelings about the game, when the plus yardage and minus yardage is added together, this action/strategy game is a watershed design." The magazine said that the game's unique perspective helped players understand the difficult job of running backs and quarterbacks.
