= The Thompson Twins Adventure =

- Developer: Quicksilva
- Publisher: Computer and Video Games
- Programmers: David Shea (Spectrum); Fred J. Preston (C64)
- Platforms: ZX Spectrum, Commodore 64
- Release: UK: October 1984
- Genre: Adventure
- Mode: Single-player

The Thompson Twins Adventure is a 1984 graphic adventure game that was distributed by Computer and Video Games magazine as a promotional 7" flexi disc "freebie" along with its October 1984 issue (issue 36). The game is based on the Thompson Twins' single "Doctor! Doctor!", and features the Thompson Twins band members as the protagonists. The unusual storage format of the game showcases an experimental technique pioneered by the London-based Flexi Records label, and places the game alongside a small handful of other games distributed on grooved disks. This format never became established and The Thompson Twins Adventure is today valued more for its nostalgic value and as an artifact than for its gameplay, which has been uniformly panned by critics.

== Plot ==
Based on the Thompson Twins' 1984 "Doctor! Doctor!" single, the plot of The Thompson Twins Adventure revolves around the efforts of the three Thompson Twins members (Tom Bailey, Alannah Currie, and Joe Leeway) to gather ingredients for the concoction of the titular doctor's potion. The game opens with the Thompson Twins at a beach location. From there they must travel through several areas including a forest and a cavern to search for ingredients for the doctor's potion. When they have collected all ingredients and located the doctor, the doctor creates his potion and the game ends.

The nature of the doctor's potion was the secret answer to a competition launched concurrently with the game's release by Computer and Video Games. The contest ran for one month (ending on 16 November 1984) during which time contestants were intended to gather and examine clues by listening to the "Doctor! Doctor!" single (a selection of which was included on the flexi disc), listening to the game's special introduction message recorded on the same disc by the Thompson Twins, and playing through the game. When the identity of the potion was discovered, contestants were supposed to send in their answers to Computer and Video Games. The first correct answer would win the grand prize: free tickets to an upcoming Thompson Twins concert with the opportunity to meet the musicians backstage afterward. Prizes would also be awarded to ten runner-ups. Due to difficulties in the creation of the Commodore 64 version of the game, the contest deadline was extended by an extra month (i.e., to December 1984) for Commodore 64 users. The winner of the Spectrum competition was announced as Alison Wagstaf in the magazine's January 1985 issue (issue 39). The winner of the Commodore 64 version of the contest would get tickets to and backstage access at a later concert.

== Gameplay experience ==
=== Installation ===
To begin playing The Thompson Twins Adventure a player must transfer the game data from the flexi disc to the microcomputer (ZX Spectrum or Commodore 64). This can be accomplished in two ways. For both ZX Spectrum and Commodore 64 the recommended method involves making an intermediate 33 1/3 rpm recording from the flexi disc onto an audio cassette which will then be used to transfer the data to the microcomputer via its cassette connector. For the Spectrum version, a player can instead choose to transfer game data directly to the microcomputer without using an audio cassette intermediate. Using this method, the record player's headphone socket must be connected directly to the Spectrum's "ear" port via wire leads. A preamplifier is required, and the speakers should be turned off. For both methods, playback volume of the record player must be carefully monitored to ensure that the recording meter stays roughly halfway across the range (i.e. with a VU meter value of +2). The Commodore version cannot be transferred without the audio cassette intermediate, and Computer and Video Games recommended that Commodore users listen to a sample of another cassette-based Commodore game on speakers and to adjust the recording volume for The Thompson Twins Adventure to match it. Data transfer is a delicate procedure that can be disrupted by background noise, scratches, and other audio-fidelity problems. In some cases it may be necessary to re-record the game data more than once at different recording levels to correctly transfer it to the microcomputer.

=== Gameplay ===
The player characters stand before a cavern. The text caption and prompt appear below the image and the parser line appears at the very bottom marked by an underscore.

The gameplay of The Thompson Twins Adventure falls within the early graphical adventure idiom. The player is presented with a simple graphical scene with a text caption below describing important features of the scene and prominent manipulable items. Below the text caption is the parser line through which the player can type commands to the player characters. Typical typed commands follow a simple VERB-NOUN format such as "take jar" or "read newspaper". To move from one scene to the next, a player must type a directional command such as "North", "Down", or "Out". The player characters will follow the typed instructions and a new scene will take the place of the former scene. Further specialized commands follow conventions previously established in non-graphical text adventures. Thus the "look" command repeats back to the player the original description of the scene, and the "inv" command can be used to gain information on the player characters' inventory. Compass directions in the game are not always intuitive and the graphical depictions are not always accurate so gameplay often involves the creation of a game map on paper.

== Development ==
Computer and Video Games was aware of earlier efforts by magazines like Your Computer and Which Micro? & Software Review to distribute video game programs via flexi discs made by Flexi Records of London; by June 1984, plans were already under way for a C&VG flexi disc release. Early plans leading to the decision to create a pop music tie-in were based on the observation that grooved media were at the time primarily used to distribute music, and after an exploratory meeting with the Thompson Twins' management team it was agreed that C&VG could begin organizing the creation of a video game adaptation of the Twins' "Doctor! Doctor!" single. Impressed with their work on titles like the 1983 Ant Attack and the 1984 The Snowman, Computer and Video Games approached Rod Cousens and Mark Eyles of Quicksilva, and within a few weeks they had created three alpha-screens (i.e. the game's beach, forest, and cavern scenes). These scenes were presented to the Thompson Twins for approval and the project proceeded to the beta stage. When coding was complete, the Thompson Twins recorded a special introduction message for the game and selected a portion of "Doctor! Doctor!" to be released. Audio material was then recorded along with the Spectrum version of the game data onto a master tape by Flexi Records and this was used to press a metal copy of the disk. The final Spectrum version flexi discs were pressed from the metal master and were attached to the front of C&VG's October 1984 issue (issue 36). As promotional freebies, these copies of the game were used by C&VG to soften the impact of a coinciding magazine price increase from 85p to 95p. By the end of 1984, the C&VG contest associated with the game had ended and the magazine gave readers the opportunity to directly obtain additional copies of the game if they included the return postage (a 13p second class stamp). The first 25 responders received prize T-shirts.

The development of the Commodore 64 version of the game was hampered by significant technical difficulties that resulted in delays in its release and extensions to the C&VG contest deadline for Commodore users. The original plan was to include both the Commodore 64 and Spectrum versions as separate tracks on a single flexi disc release. During production of the disc for its October 1984 release, it was decided that both versions of the game would receive their own flexi disc pressing, with the Commodore 64 version mastered by Magnetic Recording Company. Due to space limitations on the magazine's cover, the more technically challenging Commodore 64 version was ultimately not included with the magazine's October 1984 issue. Readers were instructed to write away for a free copy of the Commodore version and the contest deadline was pushed to 16 November 1984 to accommodate Commodore gamers. Reporting "considerable problems" in the production of the Commodore 64 version of the game, C&VG ended its contest for the Spectrum version of the game and awarded prizes in November 1984 as scheduled; however, the company extended the deadline to December 1984 for Commodore users who had not yet had a chance to play the game. A separate but identical prize (i.e. free concert tickets and a backstage pass) would be awarded to the winning Commodore gamer.

The Thompson Twins Adventure was re-released in 1995 as part of an Epic Games compilation CD-ROM entitled "Speccy Sensations".

== Reception ==
The Thompson Twins Adventure received little critical attention at its time of release. In its 1985 Yearbook Special, Computer and Video Games reported that the Thompson Twins had taken "a great interest in the whole idea", noting that Joe Leeway had taken particular interest in the game. Computer and Video Games covered The Thompson Twins Adventure again in July 1998 for its 200th issue, where the game was offered as an example of one of the magazine's best "freebie" promotions. In subsequent years, however, the game has been discussed by a number of music and tech-oriented journals where it has been sharply criticized for its animation, plot, and game speed. Writing for Stylus Magazine in 2004, Dom Passantino included The Thompson Twins Adventure as number five in his list of "Top Ten Rubbish Video Games That Feature Musicians" where he criticized the game for its "really really badly drawn graphics" and character sprite design, and suggested that "the game appears to have no plot at all". In 2007 the game was described by Wired's Susan Arendt as "very, very slow" and "complete crap", although Arendt also found it "nifty in a nostalgic kind of way". Criticism from Boing Boing was much the same with editor Cory Doctorow posting that the game is "bizarre", potentially "a bit frustrating", and ultimately "crap". For TechCrunch, Vince Veneziani described The Thompson Twins Adventure as "tripped out" and "tough as hell". In 2008, Eurogamer's Martyn Carroll suggested that the interest level generated by the game's plot was appropriate for "those with the patience of a coma victim". In 2010, Sabotage Times' Paul Brown simply described it as "uninspiring".

In contrast, fan reception of the Computer and Video Games promotional contest was reported by the magazine as being particularly enthusiastic. Reader response rates reached into the hundreds with both written and phoned responses. At this point in the magazine's history, this was their most popular contest.

More recently, the game has become something of a collector's item due to its rarity on the secondary market.
