= Vinyl data =

Analog storage medium

Vinyl data is the use of vinyl discs to store sequenced/encoded data rather than for simple analog recordings. This alternate use of the storage medium enabled the code of full motion videos (FMVs) and even simple video games to be stored in an analog format along with the soundtrack and sound effects. These vinyl data discs took two forms: the FMV-only Capacitance Electronic Disc (CED), and the program sheet. Uncommon even in the early 1980s when the practice was at its height, program sheet game data required that users record from the disc (typically a flexi disc like the Interface Age "Floppy ROM") onto an audio cassette tape which could then be used via the cassette port with microcomputers such as the BBC Micro, Commodore 64, Commodore PET, VIC-20, Dragon 32/64, ZX81, or ZX Spectrum. The use of CEDs to store video game FMV data was even less common, and required the game console (typically an arcade machine) to select a section of the grooved track to read with its stylus at just the right time for the video to be displayed. The numerous limitations of these techniques (background noise, scratches, and other audio-fidelity problems) contributed to their failure to receive widespread acceptance and video game data stored in this manner remains some of the most difficult to archive and preserve.

== List of vinyl-data releases ==
Rel.	Rel. Title	Game titles	Label	Notes	Ref(s)
1978	Elektor Software Service 001	"Mastermind"	Elektor	Program sheet (1 game; 4 non-game apps)	
1979	Elektor Software Service 003	"Four-in-a-row" "Surround"	Elektor	Program sheet (2 games; 3 non-game apps)	
1979	Elektor Software Service 005	"Battleships" "Keyplay" "Luna"	Elektor	Program sheet (3 games; 4 non-game apps)	
1979	Elektor Software Service 006	"Space Shoot-Out"	Elektor	Program sheet (1 game; 2 non-game apps)	
1982	First ZX-81 Flexisoft Disc	"Othello"	Your Computer	Program sheet	
1982	ZX-81 VIC-20 Spectrum Games Flexisoft Disc	"Galactic Hitch-Hiker" "Antispace" "Speedster"	Your Computer	Program sheet	
1983	Free Programs for ZX81 Spectrum BBC Vic 20 PET	"Blockade" "Blodhop" "Robotchase" "Dominoes" "Supervade"	Which Micro? & Software Review	Program sheet	
1983	Camouflage	"Flying Train"	EMI	Program sheet	
1983	NFL Football	"NFL Football"	Bally Midway	CED	
1984	Free Programs	"Stellar Run" "Energy Fields" "Galaxians" "Fall Guy"	Personal Computer Games	Program sheet	
1984	The Thompson Twins Adventure	"The Thompson Twins Adventure"	Computer and Video Games/Quicksilva	Program sheet	
1985	Discoflex	"Wargame" "Hypersports" (demo)	MicroHobby	Program sheet	
1985	Discolist	"Eggscape - La Fuga Dell'Uovo"	List	Program sheet	
1985	Discolist	"Epidemic"	List	Program sheet	
1985	Free Flexidisc of Games	"Xbec" "Climber" "Bonus Game"	Computer Gamer	Program sheet	
