= Glider Rider =

1986 video game

- Developer: Binary Design
- Publisher: Quicksilva/Argus Press Software
- Platforms: ZX Spectrum, Commodore 64, Amstrad CPC
- Release: 1986
- Genre: Action-adventure
- Mode: Single-player

Glider Rider is an isometric action-adventure game published by Argus Press Software on its Quicksilva label in 1986 for the ZX Spectrum, Commodore 64, and Amstrad CPC. The music was composed by David Whittaker.

== Plot ==
The terrorist Abraxas Corporation must be destroyed. An agent has been sent to their artificial island to bomb the ten reactors that power their base. To complete the mission he has been given a supply of grenades and a motorcycle capable of transformation into a hang glider.

== Gameplay ==
The player must destroy the reactors on the island by dropping grenades on them. The reactors are defended by laser gun towers which can be temporarily disabled by disrupting their control towers.

The player's character rides a machine which is a combination motorcycle and hang glider. By driving down a mountainside and suddenly reversing direction, the player can take to the air. He can fly in any direction, or lose height, but cannot climb higher. There are many mountains on the island to help him achieve flight. To destroy a reactor he must fly over it dropping grenades.

On touching ground the motorcycle is restored. If the player falls in the sea he will be eaten by sharks.

== Reception ==
Reception

Awards
Publication	Award
Crash	Crash Smash ^{128K version only}
Sinclair User	SU Classic

Sinclair User were highly positive of the game, especially the music on the 128K version, awarding it a "Sinclair User Classic". In a 1986 review, Your Sinclair were less enthusiastic, summarising their review with 5/10 saying "Glider Rider is a bit like the island it's set on. Looks good from a distance, lacks real depth."

Crash felt that the differences between the 48K and 128K versions were so great they warranted different ratings - 80% and 92% respectively, thus awarding the 128K version a Crash Smash, but not the 48K version.
