= Zombie Zombie =

ZX Spectrum computer game by Sandy White, published in 1984 by Quicksilva

- Cover art
- Developer: Spaceman Ltd
- Publisher: Quicksilva
- Designers: Sandy White; Angela Sutherland
- Platform: ZX Spectrum
- Release: EU: 1984
- Genre: Action
- Mode: Single player

Zombie Zombie is a ZX Spectrum computer game developed by Spaceman Ltd (Sandy White and Angela Sutherland), published in 1984 by Quicksilva. It is a development of Spaceman's previous Ant Attack, and uses an updated "Softsolid 3D" isometric graphics engine.

== Gameplay ==
The player is alone in an ancient partially walled city infested with zombies. They must lure the zombies into following the player and then trick them into falling off the edge of tall structures more than three blocks high. The player must get close enough to the zombies to attract their attention into following them, but not so close as to be overwhelmed and become a zombie themselves.

Zombie Zombie includes a helicopter, which can be piloted and used to alter the architecture by lifting and dropping bricks.

=== City ===
The city is made of blocks which can be rearranged by the player to make the zombie cull easier. As the city walls are incomplete in places, Personal Computer Games recommended that the player's first action was to rebuild the wall, preventing zombies from wandering off to the outer desert and making the game impossible to complete.

Your Spectrum revealed in a tips article that there was a second hidden city accessed by entering a codephrase.

City #1 contains the phrase "© AS" (Angela Sutherland) and City #2 the phrase "SPACEMAN WAS HERE!" made out of blocks.

== Development ==
Zombie Zombie uses two-channel sound, a then unheard-of feat of a computer equipped with only single-channel 1-bit sound from a tiny speaker. Through the use of the Sinclair ZX Interface 1, the game's two-channel melodies could be played back on a MIDI-equipped synthesizer. Although a wiring diagram was supplied with the game, the interfacing code had been tested on a Yamaha DX7 with a ROM containing bugs and the circuit would only work on that particular synthesizer. This came to light when Sandy White attempted to demo the game while connected to an unfamiliar synthesizer.
