= Rupert and the Toymaker's Party =

1985 video game

- Developer: Quicksilva
- Publisher: Quicksilva
- Designer: Martin Walker
- Platforms: Commodore 64, ZX Spectrum
- Release: 1985
- Genre: Platform
- Mode: Single-player

Rupert and the Toymaker's Party is a video game developed by Martin Walker and published by Quicksilva in 1985. It was developed for the Commodore 64 and ZX Spectrum.

The game is based on Rupert Bear, the British cartoon and comics strip character created in 1920 by the British artist Mary Tourtel. In this platform arcade game the player takes the role of Rupert the Bear and the mission is to get to a party in the Toymaker's castle, to meet his friends. According to the story line of this adventure, Rupert has made himself late for the party and must go through the castle collecting all the party invitations his friends have left behind for him.

== Gameplay ==
The game is divided into seven levels, each being four screens long and consisting of three floors connected by stairways that Rupert uses to go up and down. In each level there are toys and birds who are annoyed because they have not been invited to the party and now are trying to stop Rupert from going too. Each level features different kind and number of enemies like marching toy soldiers, toy trains, toy airplanes, Jack-out-of-the-boxes and evil birds. The level of difficulty increases with each level. If Rupert touches any of the toys he loses one of his available energy lives. There are also some allies that will help Rupert on his way to the party. For instance, Rupert can jump on the white-birds and planes and they will transport him to inaccessible platforms of the castle. Once Rupert has collected all the party invitations in a certain level, a door to the next level will open. He must complete all seven levels before making it to the party. If all the lives or chances are lost, Rupert simply gives up and leaves the castle.

== Reception ==
Magazine reviews of the time praised the game for its graphics and sound effects, including the size of the sprites, the details and colors of the background, capturing the flavour of the original book illustrations, and the music and sound effects.
