= Timegate =

Timegate may refer to:

- TimeGate, an Atlanta-based Doctor Who and Stargate convention
- TimeGate Studios, an American video game developer
- Time-Gate, a 1983 video game
- Time Gate: Knight's Chase, a 1996 video game
- Timegates, a 1997 anthology
- Time Gate A 1972 children's novel by John Jakes

== See also ==
- Time portal
