= Time-Gate =

1982 video game

- Developer: John Hollis
- Publisher: Quicksilva
- Platform: ZX Spectrum
- Release: 1982
- Genre: Action
- Mode: Single-player

Time-Gate (also known as Timegate, 4D Time-Gate or 4D Defender) is a ZX Spectrum game from Quicksilva, and one of the first 3D combat games. The name is derived from its treatment of time as a dimension, in which one could travel (albeit backwards only). The first press launch in the UK games industry was for this title.

== Plot ==
Time-Gate had one embarking on a perilous mission to repel the Squarm invaders who have conquered Earth, by fighting through hordes of same, thus finding and locating the time-gates (hence the name) and using the gates to travel back through time to an earlier era, where one fought through more Squarm to find another gate. Eventually, if one hadn't been killed by the enemy, one got back to the year before the Squarm invaded, located their home planet, and locked onto it with one's meson RAM (48K), thereby destroying it and retroactively preventing its inhabitants from ever having invaded in the first place.

== Development ==
Time-Gate, due to its intense use of machine-code-driven sound, placed more stress on the Spectrum's sound capabilities than previous games, and thereby inadvertently revealed a design flaw in early machines, whereby the Time-Gate sound effects would crash those machines. This resulted in some people buying the game to stress-test their Spectrums.
