= ZX Touch =

Handheld game console

- ZX Touch model ZXT-001 with home screen and illuminated side lights
- Also known as: ZXT
- Developer: Goran Radan
- Manufacturer: Elmar Electronic d.o.o.
- Type: Handheld game console
- Released: 18 November 2023; 2 years ago
- Operating system: Bare-metal (no operating system)
- CPU: 480 MHz ARM Cortex-M7
- Storage: Internal (for built-in games), microSD card slot
- Removable storage: microSD (FAT32 or exFAT)
- Display: 7-inch IPS touchscreen, 1024 × 600 px resolution, 50 Hz refresh rate
- Sound: 28 mm 1.5 W speaker
- Input: Touchscreen, 8 tactile buttons and analog stick
- Connectivity: Wi-Fi (file management), USB-C (charging)
- Power: 3000 mAh rechargeable LiPo battery, 5VDC/1A USB-C charging
- Current firmware: v1.13
- Dimensions: 249 x 123 x 15 mm (21mm including analog stick)
- Weight: 533 grams (18.8 oz)

The ZX Touch (ZXT) is an emulation-based ZX Spectrum handheld game console from Elmar Electronic, released on 18 November 2023. It features a 7-inch touchscreen, a bare-metal emulator, and real-time in-game FX enhancement capabilities. The console has 34 built-in licensed games, and supports loading additional titles via microSD or Wi-Fi file transfer.

== History ==
=== Development ===
The ZX Touch originated as a hobby project by Goran Radan, co-owner of Elmar Electronic from Croatia, driven by passion for the ZX Spectrum and embedded microcontrollers. Goran, who had previously designed and released the ZX-VGA-JOY interface, developed initial prototypes that led to a dedicated console focused on accurate emulation and usability for ZX Spectrum games. The decision to bring the ZXT to market was influenced by discussions with fellow enthusiasts.

=== Launch ===
The device was unexpectedly unveiled at the Crash Live! event held in Kenilworth, England, on 18 November 2023, where units were also available for immediate purchase by attendees. Goran considered the ZX Spectrum Vega+ debacle, an earlier crowdfunded handheld with assorted issues, “a huge burden” that made the community suspicious of similar projects. Consequently, he avoided crowdfunding and kept the ZX Touch release silent until it was ready.

== Reception ==
In their magazine reviews, Crash found the ZX Touch "great fun" and "very competent," while PC Pro found it a "well-built, highly configurable device"; however, both felt its price was a little high.

== Hardware ==
The ZX Touch emulates both the ZX Spectrum 48K and 128 models using a bare-metal system on a 480 MHz ARM Cortex-M7. The absence of an operating system enables gaming to be ready in under one second from power-on (with title screen disabled) through direct hardware communication. Developing an emulator on this type of hardware was the biggest challenge for Goran.

Visuals are displayed on a 7-inch 1024 x 600 IPS touchscreen with a 50 Hz refresh rate, synchronised with the original ZX Spectrum, unlike PC emulators whose refresh rate is tied to the computer (usually 60 Hz). This key feature replicates the smooth motion of an original ZX Spectrum connected to a CRT.

Whilst all system functions are accessible via the touchscreen, player control is provided by eight tactile buttons and an analog stick, all of which are fully configurable and saveable per game. A virtual keyboard is available on the touchscreen for keyboard-centric titles like adventure games.

For durability, the console is designed with replaceable parts, such as the analog stick, speaker, and touchscreen. The integrated rechargeable battery, also replaceable, provides up to six hours of portable gameplay.

The console supports firmware updates and file management over its Wi-Fi hardware.

== Software ==
Unlike generic retro consoles that rely on Android-based emulators, the ZX Touch utilises a bespoke C/C++ software environment, operating directly on its hardware without a traditional operating system.

It includes a SE Basic ROM (GPL v2 licensed) and 34 built-in licensed games, such as Baby-man vs Man-baby ZXT and Baby-man vs Nappy Bird ZXT, both designed for the console by utilising its custom in-game backgrounds feature. The device supports game loading via microSD in several formats, including its own ZTG (ZX Touch Game) that allows for bundled game data.

Driven by Goran's passion for visually refreshing classic games, the ZX Touch FX System acts as a dynamic post-processing layer applied on top of the emulator. Utilising colour palette changes, edge shading, transparency, and background images, these enhancements visually transform any game in real time while the original code runs entirely untouched.

Other features include a poke tool, optional ULAplus, turbo modes, game rewind, save/load states, and tape emulation. The console also features firmware update capabilities.
