= Ant Attack =

1983 video game

- Cover art by David John Rowe
- Developer: Sandy White
- Publisher: Quicksilva
- Engine: Softsolid 3D
- Platforms: ZX Spectrum, Commodore 64
- Release: EU: 1983; (Spectrum); 1984 (C64)
- Genre: Action
- Mode: Single-player

Ant Attack is an action video game developed by Sandy White for the ZX Spectrum and published by Quicksilva in 1983. A Commodore 64 version was released in 1984.

While Zaxxon and Q*bert previously used isometric projection, Ant Attack added an extra degree of freedom (ability to go up and down instead of just north, south, east and west), and it may be the first isometric game for home computers. The same type of isometric projection was used in Sandy White's later Zombie Zombie. It was also one of the first games to allow players to choose their gender.

== Gameplay ==
ZX Spectrum in-game screenshot

The player chooses whether to control the character of "Girl" or "Boy", who then enters the walled city of Antescher to rescue the other, who has been captured and immobilised somewhere in the city.

The city is inhabited by giant ants which chase and attempt to bite the player. The player can defend themselves by throwing grenades at the ants, but these can also harm the humans. Once the hostage is rescued, the two must escape the city. The game then starts again with the hostage located in a different, harder-to-reach part of the city.

== Development ==
Almost all of the game code was written by hand on paper using assembler mnemonics, then manually assembled, with the resulting hexadecimal digits typed sequentially into an external EEPROM emulator device (a.k.a. SoftROM or "softie") attached to a host Spectrum. Similarly, the character graphics and other custom sprites were all hand-drawn on squared paper and manually converted to strings of hex data. Additionally, some minor add-on routines such as high score registration were added on to the core game using regular Sinclair BASIC.

The game's setting of "Antescher" is a reference to the artist M. C. Escher.

== Reception ==
Reception

Review scores
Publication	Score
Crash	85%
Computer and Video Games	30/40
Personal Computer Games	7/10

Ant Attack was well received by gaming press. The game was nominated in the 1983 Golden Joystick Awards for Best Original Game of the Year, eventually coming second to Ah Diddums. The ZX Spectrum version was rated number 14 in the Your Sinclair's Official Top 100 Games of All Time.

In 2009, the staff of Edge wrote that it "marked the very beginnings of the survival horror genre".
