= Quicksilva =

British software publisher

- Type: Private
- Industry: Video games
- Founded: 1980; 46 years ago
- Founder: Nick Lambert
- Defunct: 1990; 36 years ago
- Headquarters: Southampton (1979-85); London (1985-89)
- Products: Time-Gate; Bugaboo; Ant Attack; Zombie Zombie; Glider Rider

Quicksilva was a British games software publisher active during the early 1980s.

They were founded by Nick Lambert in 1980, with the name Quicksilva inspired by a particular guitar solo in a track on the album Happy Trails by Quicksilver Messenger Service. Quicksilva mainly released games for the ZX81, Commodore 64 and ZX Spectrum, but also did conversions and some original games for the VIC-20, Dragon 32/64, Oric-1/Atmos, BBC Micro and Acorn Electron home computers.

One of their earliest titles was QS Defenda (originally QS Defender), a clone of the Defender arcade game for the ZX80 and ZX81 home computers. Greater success followed with later releases, including a Star Raiders-style game entitled Time-Gate which reached the top of the ZX Spectrum charts in December 1982. Amongst the company's other successes were Jeff Minter's Gridrunner (1983), Bugaboo (1983, a.k.a. La Pulga) and Fred (1983, titled "Roland on the Ropes" on the Amstrad CPC), the latter two titles licensed from Indescomp S.A., a Spanish software house. They were also responsible for the hugely innovative Ant Attack (1983), written by Sandy White for the ZX Spectrum which featured revolutionary 3-D graphics (which a patent application was made for).

In early 1984, they published their first licensed title, an adaptation of the 1978 book The Snowman by Raymond Briggs, although Software Manager Paul Cooper ruled out an adaption of Briggs' When The Wind Blows stating "nuclear war can upset a lot of people".

== Later years ==
In May 1984, the company was bought by Argus Press Software which later became Grandslam Entertainment. Paul Cooper and Managing Director Rod Cousens left to establish Electric Dreams Software in 1985, when Argus moved the company from Southampton to London.

The company continued to publish licensed products, including the first official home computer conversion of Atari's Battlezone, Eric Bristow's Pro Darts, two different games based on Strontium Dog from the 2000 AD comic and Fantastic Voyage (an official licence from the 1966 film).

In late 1984 they developed The Thompson Twins Adventure (an adaptation of the Thompson Twins single Doctor! Doctor!) which was published by Computer and Video Games magazine on a flexi-disc, and published Sandy White's follow-up to Ant Attack, Zombie Zombie.

The following years brought further tie-ins including games featuring Rupert Bear in Rupert and the Toymaker's Party, The Flintstones in Yabba Dabba Doo! and Max Headroom. It also produced popular original titles such as Glider Rider and two more arcade ports, Taito's Elevator Action in 1987 and the final Quicksilva game, Namco's Pac-Land in 1989.
