= List of VIC-20 games =

This is a list of VIC-20 games. SA section at the bottom contains games written by hobbyists long after the mainstream popularity of the VIC-20 waned. Many of these are unlicensed clones of arcade games or games from other systems.

== Commercial games ==
There are 845 games on this list.

Name	Year	Publisher
'O' Level Caper, The	1983	Phoenix Software
3-Deep Space	1983	Postern
3D Labyrinth	1982	Dk'tronics
3D Man	1982	Nufekop
3D Maze	1983	Galactic Software
3D Silicon Fish	1984	Thor Software
3D Time Trek	1983	Anirog
A-maz-ing	1981	Audiogenic
A.C.E. - Air Combat Emulator	1985	Cascade
A.E.	1982	Broderbund
Abductor	1982	Llamasoft
Acey Ducey	1982	Titan
Action Games	1981	Creative Software
Adventure	1982	Computermat
Adventureland	1981	Commodore
African Beads (aka Owerri)	1982	Commodore
Aggressor (aka Andes Attack)	1982	Human Engineered Software
Airlock	1984	Omen Software
Alien	1983	Mikrogen
Alien (aka Alien Demon)	1982	Impact Software
Alien Attack	1982	Interceptor Software
Alien Blitz	1981	Audiogenic
Alien Hunter	1983	Abrasco
Alien Invasion	1982	Computermat
Alien Panic	1981	Nufekop
Alien Plague		Bubble Bus
Alien Sidestep	1983	O.E.M.
Alien Soccer	1982	Rabbit Software
Alien, The	1982	Audiogenic
Alpha Blaster	1983	Sumlock
Alphabet Zoo	1982	Human Engineered Software
Alphoids	1983	Romik
Amazing Maze	1983	O.E.M.
Amoeba	1983	K-Tel
Amok	1981	Audiogenic
Android Attack (Abrasco)	1983	Abrasco
Android Attack (Titan)	1982	Titan
Animal Magic	1983	Romik
Annihilator	1982	Victory Software
Another Vic in the Wall	1982	Bug-Byte
Ant Eater	1983	Romox
Ant Raiders	1982	P.R. Software
Anti-matter		ALA Software
Antimatter Splatter	1982	Nufekop
Ape Escape (aka Cosmic Jailbreak)	1982	Spectravideo
Apple Bug	1982	Lyversoft
Apple Panic	1982	Creative Software
Arachnoid	1982	UMI (United Microware Industries)
Arcade Football	1981	Nufekop
Arcadia	1982	Imagine
Artillery	1981	Computermat
Artillery Duel	1983	Xonox
Assault from the Deep	1983	K-Tel
Asteroid Attack (aka Space Storm)	1982	Softsmith Software
Asteroids	1983	Bug-Byte
Asteroyds	1983	Solar Software
Astro Command	1982	Comm*Data
Astro Fighters	1982	Sumlock
Astro Patrol	1983	Synapse Software
Astroblitz	1982	Creative Software
Astroiders	1983	Pulsonic
Atlantis	1983	Imagic
Atom Smasher	1983	Romik
Attack of the Mutant Camels (aka Matrix)	1983	Human Engineered Software
Autobahn (aka Road Rally)	1982	Commodore
Aztec Challenge	1982	Cosmi
B1 Nuclear Bomber	1983	Avalon Hill
Backfire	1982	Commodore
Backgammon	1982	Bug-Byte
Bandit	1982	Titan
Bandits	1983	Sirius
Bank Robber (aka Raid on Fort Knox)	1981	Commodore
Banshee Castle	1983	Ramiak
Bat and Ball (aka Nought and Crosses, aka Bomber, aka Codebreaker)	1983	Spectrum Games
Battle Zone	1982	Titan
Battle of Britain	1983	Maincomp Ltd
Battlefield (aka Battleground)	1983	Anirog
Battlezone	1983	Atarisoft
Beast of Eden	1985	Livewire
Bengo	1982	Mr.Micro
Bewitched	1983	Imagine
Bird of Prey	1983	Lyversoft
Black Hole	1982	Creative Software
Black Max	1982	Commodore
Blackjack	1982	P.R. Software
Blitz (aka City Bomber)	1982	Commodore
Blitzkrieg	1982	Llamasoft
Block Buster	1984	Romik
Blockade (Audiogenic)	1982	Audiogenic
Blockade (IMS Software)		IMS Software
Blocked		Audiogenic
Blokit (aka Gobang)	1982	Commodore
Blowup	1982	Nufekop
Blue Meanies from Outer Space	1981	Commodore
Bob's Blunder	1983	Pulsonic
Bomber		IMS Software
Bomber (aka Valley Bomber)	1981	Nufekop
Bomber Attack	1982	Avalon Hill
Bomber Copter	1982	Photronics
Bomber Mission	1984	Commodore
Bomber Run	1983	K-Tel
Bomber Word	1982	Tymac
Bongo	1984	Anirog
Bonzo	1982	Audiogenic
Boss Chess (aka Grand Master)	1982	Audiogenic
Boxed-In	1983	Commander Magazine
Brainstorm	1982	Pixel
Breakout (American Peripherals)	1981	American Peripherals
Breakout (Soft Toys)	1982	Soft Toys
Brennball	1982	Commodore
Bricks	1984	Palace Software
Bridge	1983	Handic
Bridge Man	1983	Acme Software
Buck Rogers: Planet of Zoom	1983	Sega Enterprises
Bug Crusher	1983	O.E.M.
Bug Diver	1983	Galactic Software
Bug Spree	1982	CDS
Bugsy	1983	Mr.Chip
Bullet	1984	Mastertronic
Canadian Tire	1982	Commodore
Cannibal	1982	Yorkshire Microcomputers
Cannonade / Cannon Shoot (aka Kanonade)	1982	Commodore
Cannonball	1983	Dynapak Digital Duplication Systems
Cannonball Blitz	1982	Sierra Online
Capture the Flag	1983	Sirius
Car Chase (aka Auto Racer)	1981	Commodore
Cargar	1983	Cymbal Software
Carom (aka Deflection)	1981	UMI (United Microware Industries)
Carrier Attack	1983	Rabbit Software
Cassette 50	1983	Cascade
Castlemath	1982	Audiogenic
Cataclysm	1983	Audiogenic
Catch, The	1982	Nufekop
Catcha Snatcha	1983	Imagine
Catcha Troopa	1983	Abrasco
Caterpilla	1983	Ocean Software
Caterpillar	1983	Romik
Cattle Roundup	1981	Computermat
Cave Fighter	1985	Bubble Bus
Cave In	1982	Spectravideo
Cavern Fighter	1982	Anirog
Cavern Raider	1983	Solar Software
Cavern Run (aka Journey)	1982	Bubble Bus
Caves of Annod	1982	Comm*Data
Caves of Silver	1982	Computermat
Cells and Serpents	1983	ASP Software
Centipede	1983	Atarisoft
Centropods	1983	Rabbit Software
Chariot Race	1983	Micro Antics
Chase (Computermat)	1981	Computermat
Chase (Cymbal Software)	1983	Cymbal Software
Chess	1982	Bug-Byte
Chicken Challenge	1983	Micro Antics
China Clan (aka Chinamen)	1982	Commodore
Chivalry		Comm*Data
Choc-a-bloc	1983	Paramount Software
Choplifter	1982	Creative Software
Chopper	1982	Sumlock
Chopper Raid	1982	Bubble Bus
Chuck Norris Superkicks	1983	Xonox
Cliffhanger / Numbers	1983	Polar Computer Specialties
Close Encounters of the Worst Kind	1983	O.E.M.
Cloudburst	1983	Audiogenic
Clowns	1982	Commodore
Cobra		Video Showcase
Code Breaker	1981	Audiogenic
Code Maker	1981	Audiogenic
Collide	1981	Nufekop
Colonel's House	1983	Rabbit Software
Compusport Baseball	1983	K-Tel
Compusport Grand Prix	1983	K-Tel
Computer War	1983	Thorn EMI
Congo Bongo	1983	Sega Enterprises
Connect 4		Artic
Conquering Everest	1983	ASP Software
Conqueror	1982	Computer Software Associates
Convention	1983	Cymbal Software
Conversions		Comm*Data
Cops 'n' Robbers	1983	Abrasco
Cosmiads	1983	Bug-Byte
Cosmic Battle	1982	Rabbit Software
Cosmic Cruncher	1982	Commodore
Cosmic Firebirds	1983	Solar Software
Cosmonaut	1983	Melbourne House
Count, The	1981	Commodore
Countdown	1983	Paramount Software
Country Garden, A	1983	Supersoft
Crater Hop	1983	Nufekop
Crater Raider	1983	Boone
Crazy Balloon	1983	Cymbal Software
Crazy Cavey	1985	Mastertronic
Crazy Climber	1982	Lyversoft
Crazy Kong	1983	Interceptor Software
Crazy Scaler	1983	Commander Magazine
Creepers	1983	Virgin Games
Creepy Corridors	1983	Sierra Online
Cribbage	1982	Microfex
Cricket	1982	Computermat
Critical Path	1983	Dynapak Digital Duplication Systems
Critters	1983	Rabbit Software
Crossfire	1981	Sierra Online
Cruncher	1983	K-Tel
Crush, Crumble and Chomp!	1982	Epyx
Cryptowhiz / Unscramble	1983	Polar Computer Specialties
Curse of the Werewolf, The	1983	Terminal Software
Cyclon	1983	Boone
Cyclons	1983	Rabbit Software
D'Fuse	1983	Tymac
Dam Bomber	1982	Human Engineered Software
Dam Busta / Dambuster	1983	Rabbit Software
Damsel	1982	Comm*Data
Dancing Bear	1983	Koala
Dare Devil Diver	1983	ALA Software
Dark Dungeons, The (aka The Dungeons)	1983	Anirog
Deadly Duck	1982	Sirius
Deadly Skies	1983	Tronix
Death Race	1984	Atlantis Software
Death Star	1983	Gameworx
Defend	1983	Commodore
Defenda	1982	Llamasoft
Defender	1983	Atarisoft
Defender on Tri	1982	Nufekop
Deflect (aka Deflex V)	1982	VIC-Soft
Delivery Alert	1983	ALA Software
Demon Attack	1983	Imagic
Demon Driver	1983	Lyversoft
Demon Hunt	1983	Cymbal Software
Demon Knight	1983	ASP Software
Destroyer	1982	Sumlock
Dig Dug	1983	Atarisoft
Digger	1983	Mr.Micro
Digits	1982	Sumlock
Diver (aka Moby Dick)		Video Showcase
Dodge Cars (aka Motorway)	1982	The Wizard's Magic Toy Box
Dodger		IMS Software
Dodo Lair	1984	Software Projects
Donkey Kong	1983	Atarisoft
Doodle Bug	1985	Mastertronic
Dot Gobbler (aka Frogman)	1983	O.E.M.
Dotman	1983	Anirog
Double Trouble	1983	Abrasco
Dracula	1983	Anirog
Dragonfire	1983	Imagic
Dragons and Treasure	1982	Comm*Data
Draw Poker	1981	Commodore
Droids	1983	T.G.Software
Duck Shoot (aka Kwazy Kwaks)	1983	Mastertronic
Dungeons of Death	1983	Aardvark Software
Earth Defense	1982	Commodore
Earthquake	1983	Mogul
Electra Sport Soccer	1983	K-Tel
Electric Snapper	1983	ALA Software
Emmet Attack	1983	Commodore
Encounter IQ	1982	Pixel
Engine Shed (aka Steam Train)	1981	Commodore
English Invaders (aka Invaders English)	1982	Rabbit Software
Envahi	1983	Virgin Games
Escape	1982	Nufekop
Escape MCP	1982	Comm*Data
Evasion	1983	Logidisque
Exterminator, The	1982	Nufekop
Falcon Fighter	1983	Interceptor Software
Fantazia	1983	Interceptor Software
Fast Eddie	1982	Sirius
Fatty Henry	1984	Software Projects
Feeding Time	1983	Aim Software
Final Orbit / Bumper Bash	1983	Sirius
Fire Galaxy	1983	Anirog
Fire Trek	1981	VIC-Soft
Flight Path 737	1984	Anirog
Flight Zero - One Five	1983	AVS
Fly Snatcher	1982	Abrasco
Football Manager	1984	Addictive
Forbidden Tower	1985	Atlantis Software
Four Gates to Freedom (Adventure)	1983	Phoenix Software
Four Gates to Freedom (Arcade)	1983	Phoenix Software
Fourth Encounter	1983	Thorn EMI
Frantic	1983	Imagine
Frog	1982	Interceptor Software
Frog Chase (aka Frogrun)		Artic
Frogger (Parker Brothers)	1983	Parker Brothers
Frogger (Rabbit Software)	1982	Rabbit Software
Frogger (Sierra Online)	1983	Sierra Online
Froggy (Galactic Software)	1983	Galactic Software
Froggy (Krypton Force)	1984	Krypton Force
Frogrun	1983	Anirog
Frogs	1983	Cymbal Software
Fun with Music	1983	Epyx
Galactic Abductors	1983	Anirog
Galactic Blitz (aka Space Phreeks)	1982	Tronix
Galactic Crossfire	1982	Rabbit Software
Galactic Defender	1983	Cymbal Software
Galactic Defender (aka Quirk)	1982	The Wizard's Magic Toy Box
Galaxia	1983	Romik
Galaxian	1983	Atarisoft
Galaxions	1982	Solar Software
Galaxy Attack		Impact Software
Galaxzions	1982	Interceptor Software
Gallows	1981	Nufekop
Games Pack Vol.1	1982	Melbourne House
Games Pack Vol.2	1983	Anirog
Garden Wars	1982	Commodore
Get Lost	1983	Terminal Software
Ghost Driver (aka Hell Diver)	1982	Commodore
Ghost Man	1983	CSP Microgame
Ghost Manor	1983	Xonox
Globbler (aka Mukade)	1981	UMI (United Microware Industries)
Gobbler	1984	Blaby Computer Games
Gold Fever	1983	Tronix
Gold Rush	1981	Mr.Micro
Golden Apples of Zeus, The	1983	Romik
Golden Baton	1982	Leisuresoft
Golf	1982	Audiogenic
Gorf	1982	Commodore
Grand Prix (Lyversoft)	1983	Lyversoft
Grand Prix (Titan)	1982	Titan
Grand Prix Driving	1983	Cymbal Software
Graphic Twister	1982	Sumlock
Grave Cave, The	1982	Eathenross Software
Grave Robbers	1982	Victory Software
Great Adventure	1982	Comm*Data
Great London to Paris Air Race, The	1983	Novasoft
Gridder	1983	Terminal Software
Gridrunner	1982	Human Engineered Software
Gridtrap	1982	Livewire
Grub	1983	Commodore
Gunfight (Solar Software)	1983	Solar Software
Gunfight (Sumlock)	1982	Sumlock
Gunslinger (aka High Noon)	1984	Omega
Hangman	1981	Creative Software
Hangmath	1981	Creative Software
Hareraiser (Prelude)	1984	Haresoft
Harvester	1982	Pixel
Head On (Computermat)	1981	Computermat
Head On (Hi-Tech Ltd)		Hi-Tech Ltd
Headbangers Heaven (aka Money Wars, aka Pit)	1982	Llamasoft
Hearts and Diamonds / Hi-Lo	1983	Lyversoft
Hektik	1984	Mastertronic
Hellgate	1984	Llamasoft
Hide and Seek (2 parts)	1983	Applied Systems Knowledge (ASK)
Home Babysitter II	1982	Commodore
Hop Frog		I.K. Programs
Hopper (Audiogenic)		Audiogenic
Hopper (Rabbit Software)	1982	Rabbit Software
Hopper / Frogger	1982	Rabbit Software
Hopping Mad		Lyversoft
Hoppit	1982	Commodore
Horse Race	1983	Cymbal Software
Humphrey	1983	Mr.Micro
Hunchback	1984	Ocean Software
Hunchy	1986	Players
Hydro Blast	1984	Blaby Computer Games
IFR (Flight Simulator)	1983	Academy
Ice	1983	Cymbal Software
In the Chips	1983	Creative Software
Innovative Cassette 1	1982	Melbourne House
Innovative Cassette 2	1982	Melbourne House
Innovative Cassette 3	1982	Melbourne House
Insector	1983	Romik
Invader Fall	1981	Audiogenic
Invaders	1984	Livewire
Invaders Addition	1982	Comm*Data
Invaders Subtraction	1982	Comm*Data
Invasion	1981	Nufekop
Invincible	1983	Mr.Micro
Island, The	1982	Impact Software
It's a Living	1982	Wunderware
Jackpot (aka Vegas Jackpot)	1983	Mr.Chip
Jawbreaker II	1983	Sierra Online
Jelly Monsters	1981	Commodore
Jetpac	1983	Ultimate
Jigsaw	1983	Commodore
Jogger	1983	Paramount Software
Johnnie Jumpet	1982	Computer Software Associates
Journey (aka Jupiter Rescue)	1982	Nufekop
Jump Jet	1985	Anirog
Jumpin' Jack	1982	Livewire
Jumping Frog		Wizardsoft
Jungle Hunt	1984	Atarisoft
Jupiter Defender	1983	Interceptor Software
Jupiter Lander (aka Super Lander)	1981	Commodore
K-Star Patrol	1982	CBS
K-razy Antiks	1982	CBS
Kaktus	1983	Supersoft
Key Quest	1983	Tymac
Kiddie Checkers	1981	Audiogenic
Killer Caterpillar	1982	Wunderware
Kindercomp	1983	Human Engineered Software
King Tut	1985	Mastertronic
King's Ransom	1982	Nufekop
Knight's Move	1982	Sumlock
Kong		Video Showcase
Kongo Kong	1982	Victory Software
Konkey Kong	1983	ABi Software
Kosmic Kamikaze	1982	Audiogenic
Kraal's Kingdom	1983	Buntasoft
Krazy Kong (aka Mini Kong)	1982	Nufekop
Krell	1982	Rabbit Software
Land of Tezrel	1984	Omen Software
Laser Bike	1984	Blaby Computer Games
Laser Blast	1984	Blaby Computer Games
Laser Blitz	1982	Human Engineered Software
Laser Shoot	1983	Cymbal Software
Launch 2031AD		Softsmith Software
Lazer Maze	1983	Avant-Garde Creations
Lazer Zone (aka Laser Zone)	1983	Human Engineered Software
League Soccer	1983	Sophisticated Games
Lighthouse (aka Sub-Traction)	1982	Commodore
Line Up 4	1983	Terminal Software
Lode Runner	1983	Broderbund
Log Run	1983	Terminal Software
Logger		Snailsoft
Logic (P.R. Software)	1982	P.R. Software
Logic (Scan Products)	1984	Scan Products
Lost in the Dark	1983	Anirog
Ludwig's Lemon Lazers	1983	Mogul
Lunar Command		Audiogenic
Lunar Lander	1981	Hi-Tech Ltd
Lunar Leepers	1981	Sierra Online
Lunar Rescue	1983	Rabbit Software
Luv Bug	1984	Thor Software
Magic Mirror, The	1983	Terminal Software
Magnificent 7	1982	Audiogenic
Man on the Run	1983	Sumlock
Mangrove	1983	Supersoft
Mars Mission		Bubble Bus
Martian Raider	1982	Romik
Martians		Artic
Master Wits	1981	Audiogenic
Mastermind (Commodore)	1982	Commodore
Mastermind (Street Games)	1984	Street Games
Math Duel		Computer Software Associates
Math Hurdler	1981	Audiogenic
Maths Maze	1981	Commodore
Max	1984	Anirog
Maze	1983	Human Engineered Software
Maze Gold / mazmegold	1984	Visions
Maze Master	1983	Cymbal Software
Medieval Joust	1983	Thorn EMI
Mega Vault	1984	Imagine
Menagerie	1982	Commodore
Metagalactic Llamas Battle at the Edge of Time	1983	Llamasoft
Metamorphosis	1983	Mogul
Meteor Blaster	1982	Terminal Software
Meteor Run	1982	UMI (United Microware Industries)
Meter Mania	1983	Abrasco
Metro Blitz (aka Metro Dome)	1983	Gameworx
Mickey the Bricky	1984	Firebird Software
Micro Breakout		Llamasoft
Midway Campaign	1983	Avalon Hill
Millipede	1982	On Line Software
Mimic	1982	Nufekop
Mind Twisters	1982	Romik
Mine Madness	1983	Thorn EMI
Minefield	1982	Creative Software
Miner 2049er	1984	Reston
Mines of Saturn	1983	Mikrogen
Miniature Guided Missiles	1983	ALA Software
Minipedes	1984	Anirog
Minitron	1984	Anirog
Missile Attack	1982	P.R. Software
Missile Panic	1982	Titan
Mission Impossible	1981	Commodore
Mission Mercury	1983	Virgin Games
Mogul: Great Adventure Pack	1982	Victory Software
Mole Attack	1981	Commodore
Money Bags (aka Rescue from Nufon, aka Search)		Bubble Bus
Money Minefield	1982	Luna Software
Monster Maze (Audiogenic)	1981	Audiogenic
Monster Maze (Epyx)	1982	Epyx
Monster Muncher	1982	Spectrum Games
Moon Patrol	1983	Atarisoft
Moons of Jupiter	1982	Romik
Mosquito	1984	Atlantis Software
Mosquito Infestation	1982	Human Engineered Software
Motocross Racer	1983	Xonox
Mountain King	1983	Beyond
Mower Mania	1983	Voyager
Ms. Pac-Man	1983	Atarisoft
Multitron	1983	Sumlock
Munch Man	1983	Solar Software
Muncher	1982	The Wizard's Magic Toy Box
Munchmaid	1982	Wunderware
Mushroom Alley	1983	Mogul
Mutant Herd	1982	Thorn EMI
Myriad (aka Robot Panic)	1982	Rabbit Software
Mysterious Island, The	1982	Mr.Micro
Mystery Caves	1983	ALA Software
Mystery Island	1983	Gameworx
Naval Attack	1982	Titan
Neutron Zapper	1984	Mastertronic
New York Blitz	1984	Mastertronic
Night Drive (aka Road Race)	1981	Commodore
Night Flight	1982	Rabbit Software
Night Flyer	1983	Cymbal Software
Nightcrawler	1982	Rabbit Software
Nightmare Park		IMS Software
Nim	1983	VIC-Soft
Nosferatu	1983	Terminal Software
Nuclear Attack	1983	Lyversoft
Nukewar	1983	Avalon Hill
Number Chaser	1982	Applied Systems Knowledge (ASK)
Number Crunch	1982	Spectravideo
Number Nabber / Shape Grabber	1982	Commodore
Number Puzzler	1983	Applied Systems Knowledge (ASK)
Number Snake	1983	Edu-Kit
OZ History		Street Games
Olly	1984	Thor Software
Omega Race	1982	Commodore
Operation Ganymed	1984	Atlantis Software
Orbis	1982	Rabbit Software
Orbits	1982	Sumlock
Outback	1983	Paramount Software
Outworld	1981	UMI (United Microware Industries)
Pac-Man	1983	Atarisoft
Pack 1		VicSoft
Pacmania	1983	Mr.Chip
Pak Bomber	1982	Human Engineered Software
Pakacuda	1983	Rabbit Software
Panic	1983	Bug-Byte
Panzer Attack	1982	VIC-Ville
Panzer Duel	1982	Commodore
Parachute	1983	Commodore
Paratrooper	1982	Rabbit Software
Patience	1983	Commodore
Pedes and Mutants	1983	Romik
Penny Slot	1982	Interceptor Software
Pentavic	1984	Street Games
Perils of Willy, The	1984	Software Projects
Phantom Attack	1984	Mastertronic
Pharaoh's Curse	1983	Human Engineered Software
Pharaoh's Tomb	1982	Anirog
Pickup Game	1982	P.R. Software
Pilot Pursuit	1983	ALA Software
Pinball Spectacular	1982	Commodore
Pinball Wizard	1983	Terminal Software
Pipes	1983	Creative Software
Pirate Cove	1981	Commodore
Pit, The	1984	Interceptor Software
Pixie Maze	1983	Commodore
Plague (aka Q-Warrior)	1983	K-Tel
Polaris (Mr.Chip)	1983	Mr.Chip
Polaris (Tigervision)	1983	Tigervision
Pole Position	1983	Atarisoft
Pontoon	1982	Impact Software
Power Blaster	1983	Romik
Predator	1983	Human Engineered Software
Princess and the Frog	1983	Romox
Protector	1983	Human Engineered Software
Psycho Shopper	1984	Mastertronic
Puckman	1982	Mikrogen
Punchy	1984	Mr.Micro
Pyramid	1984	Mogul
Q*bert	1983	Parker Brothers
Qix (aka Squeeze)	1983	Wizardsoft
Quackers	1982	Rabbit Software
Quadrant	1983	Romik
Quasimodo	1984	Ace
Quattrow		Street Games
Quest of Merravid, The	1983	Martech
Quest, The	1983	Commodore
Quizmaster	1982	Commodore
R.I.P. / Rest in Peace (aka Rockman)	1984	Mastertronic
Race	1982	Commodore
Race Fun	1982	Nufekop
Raceway	1981	Nufekop
Radar Rat Race (aka Rally-X)	1981	Commodore
Raid on Isram (aka Skramble)	1983	Human Engineered Software
Rainbow Towers	1983	Applied Systems Knowledge (ASK)
Rainbows	1982	Sumlock
Rapier Punch	1983	Commodore
Rat Hotel	1982	Creative Software
Rat Man	1982	Llamasoft
Red Alert	1982	Titan
Red Baron	1985	Street Games
Renaissance	1982	UMI (United Microware Industries)
Rescue at Rigel	1982	Epyx
Rescue from Castle Dread	1983	Terminal Software
Return to Earth	1983	Mikrogen
Revenge of the Quadra	1984	Super Savers
Reversi	1983	Terminal Software
Ricochet	1982	Epyx
Riddle of the Sphinx	1983	Lyversoft
Rifle Range (ALA Software)	1983	ALA Software
Rifle Range (Titan)	1982	Titan
River Rescue	1982	Thorn EMI
Roadrace	1982	Impact Software
Roadrunner	1982	Titan
Robin Hood	1983	Xonox
Robot Mouse	1983	Galactic Software
Robotron: 2084	1983	Atarisoft
Rocket Command	1982	Titan
Rotate	1983	Cymbal Software
Rox III	1982	Dk'tronics
Ruler Dueler	1982	Commodore
Safe Cracker (ALA Software)	1983	ALA Software
Safe Cracker (Cymbal Software)	1983	Cymbal Software
Salmon Run	1983	Synapse Software
Sargon II	1981	Commodore
Satellite Patrol	1982	Human Engineered Software
Satellites and Meteorites	1982	UMI (United Microware Industries)
Saturn Strike	1983	K-Tel
Scare City Motel	1982	Commodore
Scorpion (Livewire)	1982	Livewire
Scorpion (Tronix)	1983	Tronix
Scram 20	1983	Artic
Scramble	1982	Bug-Byte
Scrambler	1982	Solar Software
Scramblers	1983	Ramiak
Sea Invasion	1983	Romik
Sea Wolf	1982	Commodore
Seafox	1983	Broderbund
Seaquest	1983	Novasoft
Search and Destroy	1982	The Wizard's Magic Toy Box
Seawolfe	1983	Mogul
Secret Mission	1983	Kew Enterprises
Secret of Bastow Manor, The	1983	Gameworx
Sector Five	1982	Commodore
Senku	1981	American Peripherals
Senorita	1983	Cymbal Software
Serpentine	1982	Creative Software
Shadowfax	1982	Postern
Shamus	1983	Human Engineered Software
Shape Up	1983	Applied Systems Knowledge (ASK)
Shark Attack	1982	Romik
Shifty	1983	Audiogenic
Shootout at the OK Galaxy	1982	Avalon Hill
Sidewinder	1982	Tronix
Siege	1982	Postern
Siege Catapult		IMS Software
Simple Simon	1981	Audiogenic
Sir Hero	1984	Commodore
Sir Lancelot	1983	Xonox
Six Gunner	1981	Nufekop
Sizzle	1983	ALA Software
Ski	1983	Commodore
Ski Run	1982	Rabbit Software
Ski Sunday	1983	Mr.Chip
Skibbereen	1982	UMI (United Microware Industries)
Skier	1982	Human Engineered Software
Skittles	1982	Commodore
Skramble (Anirog)	1983	Anirog
Skramble (Livewire)	1982	Livewire
Sky Blazer	1983	Broderbund
Sky is Falling, The	1981	Commodore
Skyhawk	1983	Quicksilva
Slap Dab	1983	Anirog
Slicker Puzzle, The	1983	Dk'tronics
Slide Puzzle	1982	Sumlock
Slider	1983	Dynapak Digital Duplication Systems
Slinky	1983	Cosmi
Slot Machine	1983	ALA Software
Smashout	1982	P.R. Software
Snails / Silo Command	1983	Polar Computer Specialties
Snake Bite		Firebird Software
Snake Byte (Sirius)	1982	Sirius
Snake Byte (Mr. Chip) (aka Snake)	1983	Mr.Chip
Snake Pit	1982	Postern
Snakeout	1981	Computermat
Snakman	1981	Microdigital
Snooker	1983	Visions
Snowstorm	1983	Pulsonic
Sorcerer and the Princess, The	1983	Gameworx
Space Adventure	1983	Dynapak Digital Duplication Systems
Space Assault	1983	Lyversoft
Space Attack / Star Fighter	1982	Romik
Space Bomber	1983	Sumlock
Space Division	1981	Audiogenic
Space Escort	1983	Romik
Space Fighter		Arcadia
Space Fortress	1983	Romik
Space Hopper	1982	Titan
Space Joust	1983	Software Projects
Space Math	1981	Commodore
Space Mouse		Mikrogen
Space Pirate (aka Cosmic Commando)	1984	Omega
Space Quest	1982	Nufekop
Space Rescue	1982	Sumlock
Space Ric-o-shay	1983	O.E.M.
Space Scramble	1984	Mastertronic
Space Shuttle	1983	Galactic Software
Space Snake (Commodore)	1983	Commodore
Space Snake (Handic)	1982	Handic, By G.Hofstede
Space Swarm	1983	Software Projects
Space Travel		Mikrogen
Space Wars	1982	Titan
Space Zap	1982	VIC-Soft
Spacebirds	1983	Cymbal Software
Spectre	1983	Commodore
Speed/Bingo Math	1982	Commodore
Spelit	1981	Nufekop
Spell	1981	American Peripherals
Spider		Nova Software
Spider City	1983	Sirius
Spider Invasion	1982	Cosmi
Spider Mine / Says Simon	1983	Polar Computer Specialties
Spiders of Mars	1983	Audiogenic
Spike's Peak	1983	Xonox
Spills and Fills	1983	Creative Software
Splatman	1982	Taysoft
Sport Search	1983	T&F Software
Sportz	1985	Street Games
Springer	1983	Tigervision
Square Pairs	1983	Scholastic
Squish	1984	Palace Software
Squish'em	1983	Sirius
Star Battle	1981	Commodore
Star Command	1983	Softsmith Software
Star Defence (aka Star Defender)	1983	Anirog
Star Fights	1983	Cymbal Software
Star Frog		Mikrogen
Star Post	1982	Commodore
Star Trek	1982	Impact Software
Star Trek - S.O.S.	1983	Sega Enterprises
Star Wars	1981	UMI (United Microware Industries)
Star Wars II	1982	Titan
Starbase	1984	Commodore
Starlord		Street Games
Starquest	1982	Pixel
Starship Escape	1982	Sumlock
Stockmarket	1983	ASP Software
Stocks and Bonds	1983	Avalon Hill
Stop Thief	1983	Commodore
Strategic Advance	1982	Commodore
Sub Attack		IMS Software
Sub Chase	1982	UMI (United Microware Industries)
Sub Command	1982	P.R. Software
Sub Hunt	1984	Mastertronic
Submarine	1981	Hi-Tech Ltd
Submarine Commander	1983	Thorn EMI
Submariner	1985	Krypton Force
Subspace Striker	1982	Pixel
Supavaders	1983	K-Tel
Super Alien	1981	Commodore
Super Amok!	1983	UMI (United Microware Industries)
Super Breakout (Atlantis Software)	1985	Atlantis Software
Super Breakout (Hi-Tech Ltd)		Hi-Tech Ltd
Super Breakout (Solar Software)	1982	Solar Software
Super Cobra (aka Super Slither)	1981	Commodore
Super Slot	1981	Commodore
Super Smash	1982	Commodore
Super Trek (aka Trek)	1982	Mogul
Super Worm		Rabbit Software
Superchomper	1982	Harli Software
Supertanker	1983	ALA Software
Swamp Monster	1983	ALA Software
Swarm	1982	Tronix
Sword of Fargoal	1982	Epyx
Sword of Hrakel	1983	Romik
Tally	1981	Nufekop
Tank	1981	Nufekop
Tank Arkade	1982	Avalon Hill
Tank Atak	1982	Supersoft
Tank Battle		Artic
Tank Commander	1984	Thorn EMI
Tank Trap	1982	Human Engineered Software
Tank War	1982	Rabbit Software
Tank Wars (Human Engineered Software)	1982	Human Engineered Software
Tank Wars (O.E.M.)	1983	O.E.M.
Tanks	1983	Cymbal Software
Target	1982	Nufekop
Target Command	1981	Computermat
Temple of Apshai, The	1983	Epyx
Ten Pin Bowls	1981	VIC-Soft
Terminal Invaders	1982	Terminal Software
Terraguard	1982	Creative Software
Three Great Games of Chance	1983	Mr.Chip
Threshold	1981	Sierra Online
Time Destroyers	1983	Romik
Time Machine, The	1983	Leisuresoft
Time Slip	1983	Phoenix Software
Tiny Tots Seven	1982	Anirog
Titan (aka Mobile Attack)	1981	Commodore
Tom Thumb	1984	Anirog
Tomarc the Barbarian	1984	Xonox
Tomb of Drewan, The	1982	Audiogenic
Tooth Invaders	1983	Commodore
Topper	1983	Romox
Torg	1982	Human Engineered Software
Tornado	1982	Quicksilva
Tower of Evil	1984	Thorn EMI
Tractor		Wizardsoft
Trader Trilogy, The	1982	Pixel
Trail West		Micro-Ed
Trains		Lancashire Micros
Trap	1983	Commodore
Trashman	1982	Creative Software
Traxx	1982	Llamasoft
Triad	1982	Livewire
Turbo Grid	1983	Microdeal
Turmoil	1982	Sirius
Tutankham	1983	Parker Brothers
Twister		Applied Systems Knowledge (ASK)
Type Attack	1982	Sirius
Typing Tutor + Word Invaders	1982	Academy
Typo	1983	Romox
UFO		Commodore
Ultima: Escape from Mt. Drash	1983	Sierra Online
Undermine	1984	Mastertronic
VIC 21	1981	Commodore
VIC Attack	1982	Soft Toys
VIC Avenger	1981	Commodore
VIC Bowling	1982	Comm*Data
VIC Invaders	1982	Bridge Software
VIC Rescue	1982	Interceptor Software
VIC Trek	1982	Comm*Data
VIC Vader	1981	Supersoft
VIC-Men	1982	Bug-Byte
Vagabondo del Tempo, Il	1984	Beatrice d'Este Edizioni
Valley, The	1983	ASP Software
Vic-Yahtzee	1982	VIC-Ville
Victrek	1982	Human Engineered Software
Video Vermin	1982	UMI (United Microware Industries)
Videomania	1982	Creative Software
Viking	1982	Prickly Pear Software
Vikman	1982	Nufekop
Villain	1984	Interceptor Software
Visible Solar System	1982	Commodore
Vixplode	1983	Abrasco
Voodoo Castle	1981	Commodore
Voyager	1983	Lyversoft
Wacky Waiters	1982	Imagine
Wall Street	1981	Audiogenic
Wallet Walker	1982	Commodore
War	1982	P.R. Software
Warrior	1983	ISCA Software
Weetabix vs The Titchies, The	1984	Romik
Whale Hunt	1983	K-Tel
Whirlwind One Five	1983	AVS
Whirlwind Rescue		Comm*Data
Whodunnit	1983	Sophisticated Games
Witch Way	1983	CDS
Wizard and The Princess, The	1982	Melbourne House
Wolf Pack	1983	ALA Software
Woodworm Whacker	1983	Dk'tronics
World At War, A	1983	Handic
Worm		Wizardsoft
Wunda Walter	1984	Interceptor Software
Xeno II	1982	Anirog
Xerus	1983	Electronic Leisure
Zaxx		Video Showcase
Zipper	1983	Scand Soft
Zok's Kingdom	1983	Anirog
Zor	1982	Pixel
Zorgon's Kingdom	1983	Romik

== Hobbyist-developed games ==
- Apocalypse (2026)
- Attack of the PETSCII Robots (2020) (non free)
- Avalanche (2012)
- Berzerk (2010)
- Blue Star (2008)
- Carling the Spider (2009)
- Caveman (2019)
- Cheese and Onion (2017)
- Cheesy Trials (2020)
- Doom (2013)
- Dungeon of Dance (2021)
- Dungeons of Ekileugor (2012)
- Escape 2020 (2020)
- Frogger '07 (2007)
- Freax (2024)
- Helix Colony (2020)
- Hissing Sid (2023)
- The Improbable War (2010)
- Island of Secrets (2009)
- Mayhem (2012)
- Natterjack (2023)
- Nautical Defence (2026)
- Orbitron (2023)
- Parachute (2008)
- Pentagorat (2016)
- Planet X1 (2009)
- Pooyan20 (2014)
- Popeye (2015)
- Pumpkid (2019)
- Quikman (2009)
- Return to Fort Knox (2008)
- Realms of Quest I (1991)
- Realms of Quest II (2004)
- Realms of Quest III (2009)
- Realms of Quest IV (2013)
- Realms of Quest V (2019)
- Sub Med (2020)
- Tank Battalion (2014)
- Ten Ten (2009)
- Theater of War (2013)
- TRBo: Turtle RescueBot (2020)
- Trolley Problem (2021)
- Vic Nibbler (2019)
- WhackE (2009)
