= Molar Maul =

1983 video game

- Publisher: Imagine Software
- Designer: John Gibson
- Platform: ZX Spectrum
- Release: 1983
- Genre: Action

Molar Maul is an action game published for the ZX Spectrum by Imagine Software in 1983. It was written in four weeks by John Gibson. The player uses a toothbrush and special toothpaste to clean teeth and kill bacteria.

== Gameplay ==
The playing area consists of a stylised open mouth, with teeth above and below, and a tube of toothpaste in the middle of the screen. The player controls a small toothbrush, which is loaded with toothpaste from the tube.

A number of small creatures, collectively known as "DK" (a pun on "decay"), fly around the mouth and attack teeth at random. Teeth are initially white, but change to progressively darker colours as they are attacked. If a tooth turns black it is lost. DKs are killed by contact with a loaded toothbrush, which also lightens non-black teeth.

As the game progresses, sweets appear and introduce ever-larger numbers of DK. The game ends when all the teeth are destroyed.

== See also ==
- Tooth Invaders
- Plaque Attack
