= Hercules Furens =

Hercules Furens can refer to:

- Herakles (Euripides), also called Hercules Furens, a Greek tragedy
- Hercules (Seneca) or Hercules Furens, a fabula crepidata
