= Jumping jack (disambiguation) =

A jumping jack is a physical exercise, also known as a star jump in the UK.

(The) Jumping jack may refer to:

- Jumping jack (toy), a toy with an attached string
- Jumping Jack (video game), 1983, also released as Leggit!
- Jumping Jack, 1984, released by Universal Entertainment Corporation
- Jack jumper ant, a variety of ant native to Australia
- Jumping jack compactor, a type of trench compactor
- Jumping Jack, a type of firework
- Jumping Jack Jones, an American baseball player in the 1880s known for his distinctive, jumping delivery
- Jumping Jacks, a 1952 Dean Martin and Jerry Lewis comedy
- "Jumpin' Jack", a song by Big Bad Voodoo Daddy
- The Jumping Jack (1930 film), a German comedy film
- The Jumping Jack (1938 film), a German comedy film

== See also ==
- "Jumpin' Jack Flash", a song by The Rolling Stones
- Jumpin' Jack Flash (film)
