= Frantic =

Frantic may refer to:

== Film ==
- Frantic (film), a 1988 film directed by Roman Polanski and starring Harrison Ford
- Frantic Films, a Canadian film production company

== Music ==
- Frantic (album), a 2002 album by Bryan Ferry
- "Frantic" (Metallica song), 2003
- Frantic (Jamie O'Neal song), 2002

== Video games ==
- Frantic (video game), a 1982 video game published by Imagine Software
- Frantic Factory, the third level in Donkey Kong 64

== Other uses ==
- Frantic Magazine, a comic book series published by Marvel UK from 1979 to 1980
- Operation Frantic, World War II shuttle bombing missions
- Frantic Assembly, a British theatre company
- Frantic, 2007 crime novel by Katherine Howell

== See also ==
- Frenzy (disambiguation)
