= Psyclapse =

Psyclapse may refer to:

- Psyclapse (company), a subsidiary of Psygnosis
- Psyclapse (Megagame), a vaporware "Megagame" planned by Imagine Software in the 1980s
