= It's Only Rock 'n' Roll (video game) =

1983 video game

- Commodore 64 box art
- Developers: K-Tel Productions; ColecoVision; Emag Software
- Publishers: ZX Spectrum, C64; K-Tel International Ltd. ColecoVision; Xonox
- Programmer: Kevin Smith
- Platforms: ColecoVision, Commodore 64, ZX Spectrum
- Release: ZX Spectrum: UK: Late 1983; Commodore 64: NA: November 1984
- Genre: Management (Music)
- Mode: Single-player

It's Only Rock 'n' Roll is a rock band management video game published in 1983 by K-Tel International. It is a text based simulation where players have 60 turns to grow a rock band into a success by recording records, signing with labels, and touring. It was programmed by Kevin Smith in BASIC and was originally released for the ZX Spectrum, sharing a cassette tape with Tomb of Dracula. The game was later released on its own for the Commodore 64 and ColecoVision.

Critics were mixed on the game, with some reviewers criticizing it heavily for its randomness, poor graphics and sound, and low brow humor. Others thought its appealing and novel ideas made it a worthwhile experience despite its downsides.

== Gameplay ==
It's Only Rock 'n' Roll is a text based business simulation game in which the player takes control of a rock band. Over the course of 60 turns, each representing a month, one of eight options is chosen in an attempt to lead the band to greater success. After 60 turns, the band leader gets too old and ages out of the business. Based on the events that unfold, the band leader can also get too depressed and quit, ending the game. The goal is to earn £1 million ($1 million in the US version), 1000 popularity points, 100 happiness points, and three status symbols.

Players can choose to name their band, plan tours, hire managers, write records and other similar activities, each costing time, money, and happiness. Early on, bands are limited to busking until they accrue enough money to give full concerts. Events often have random outcomes and song lyrics are arranged at random. Live performances are one of the few elements represented visually, accompanied by a limited rendition of the randomly generated songs. Records are ranked on a top twenty list, where player created records compete for popularity against computer generated opponents.

== Development & release ==
It's Only Rock 'n' Roll was originally released for the ZX Spectrum on one side of a double sided cassette tape. The other side contained the video game Tomb of Dracula. These two games were the first video games published in the United Kingdom by K-Tel International, which was previously known for its low cost compilation albums. Put together, they were part of what K-Tel called its "doublesider" cassettes which started to be released in the Christmas season of 1983. It's Only Rock 'n' Roll was programmed by Kevin Smith.

A version for the Commodore 64 was released in the United States in November 1984. A version was also released for the ColecoVision by K-Tel's home console division, Xonox. That version was programmed by Emag Software.

== Reception ==
Crash magazine gave the ZX Spectrum version a 41%, saying "it bores within minutes, or as soon as you realize you are more in the hands of luck than skill." Personal Computer News doubted K-Tel would be successful in the video game market "putting out mediocre software like this." Home Computing Weekly was not amused by the attempted humor in the randomized song lyrics, calling it "lavatory humor". TV Gamer on the other hand found it to be "a pleasant change from the usual adventure game." Computer and Video Games considered it "enjoyable" and a "pretty good value". According to Sinclair User, "A few graphics and more amusing responses might have improved this potentially appealing idea considerably."

Computer Entertainer reviewed the Commodore 64 version and called it "a total waste of time". They criticized the level of randomness, the limited animations, and the music which they called "the most horrible sounds we've ever heard from a Commodore 64." Electronic Games editor Arnie Katz said of the C64 version, "the strengths...outweigh the deficiencies," though he also complained about the music and wished some of the gameplay sequences were skippable. Your 64 gave it 65% and called it "compelling" and "well supported by sound and graphics." Brett Weiss reviewed the ColecoVision version in 2007 and thought the gameplay was "overly repetitious" and too reliant on luck.
