= Pedro (video game) =

1984 video game

- Developers: Creative Technology Group (Frank Johnson), Steve Cain
- Publisher: Imagine Software
- Platforms: ZX Spectrum, Commodore 64, BBC Micro, Acorn Electron, Dragon 32/64
- Release: 1984
- Genre: Action
- Mode: Single-player

Pedro is a video game developed by Frank Johnson, Aidan Rajswing, Bryce Ducharm, Andrew Impson, Brian Carpenter and Steve Cain for the ZX Spectrum and released by Imagine Software in 1984. The game uses oblique projection to give the impression of three dimensional graphics.

== Gameplay ==
The player controls the eponymous Pedro, a Mexican gardener, and the object of the game is to protect Pedro's plants from the various animals—such as ants and rats—that try to eat them. To do this Pedro must try to block the entrances to his garden with bricks, stamp on any animals that get in, and plant seeds to replace any plants that are eaten. In addition to this a tramp will break into the garden every now and then and try to steal Pedro's seeds. The game ends when no plants remain. Points are scored by stamping on animals, and a bonus is earned at the end of each level based on the number of plants remaining.

== Reception ==
Pedro received mixed reviews from UK ZX Spectrum gaming magazines. While Sinclair User awarded the game 7/10 and Crash rated it at 62%, all three of Your Spectrum's reviewers gave the game a score of 4/10. All three magazines praised the game's music.
