= Plaque Attack =

1983 video game

- Developer: Activision
- Publisher: Activision
- Designer: Steve Cartwright
- Platform: Atari 2600
- Release: NA: February 22, 1983
- Genre: Shooter
- Modes: Single-player, multiplayer

Plaque Attack is a 1983 video game for the Atari 2600 that was made by Activision. The player must shoot food to protect teeth inside a person's mouth. Steve Cartwright, who designed the game, said that game was meant to help people develop good dental habits.

== Gameplay ==
Screenshot

The player controls a tube of toothpaste, defending teeth against various types of food, such as hamburgers and french fries. The objective is to fire toothpaste at food intent on destroying the teeth. If the food touches a tooth, it begins breaking down the tooth. If the player is fast enough to shoot the piece of food as soon as it starts breaking down the tooth the player will be able to save the tooth. If not, the tooth will decay and disappears from the screen. The food comes in waves, and the movements become more complicated. Destroying the food scores points, as does the number of teeth and the amount of toothpaste left at the end of each wave.

After a certain number of points is scored, users gain bonus teeth. Bonus teeth are applied at the end of each wave. If all eight teeth are still present, the additional teeth will be placed on the sides of the mouth. Otherwise the teeth will replace any teeth lost. Play continues until all the teeth are gone, at which point the game is over.

=== Activision patch ===
Reward patch

Players who scored more than 35,000 points could send a screenshot of their accomplishment to Activision to receive a "No Plaque Pack" patch and congratulatory letter.

== Aquafresh Rebate Program ==
From August through mid-November 1983, a mail-in rebate program ran in newspaper advertisements to cross-promote Aquafresh and Plaque Attack. The ad offered a $3.15 savings in the form of an instant $0.15 credit for any size Aquafresh toothpaste, and a $3.00 rebate from Activation after sending in the Aquafresh and Plaque Attack proof of purchase.

== Reception ==
Videogaming Illustrated described the game as "cute and busy, but nothing more" and gave it B-B+ for gameplay. Video Games magazine described it, in their review, as "another slide and shoot".

== See also ==
- List of Atari 2600 games
- List of Activision games: 1980–1999
- Tooth Invaders for the Commodore 64
- Tooth Protectors for the Atari 2600
