= Zzoom =

1983 video game

- Cassette inlay for Zzoom
- Developers: John Gibson, Mark Butler, Steve Blower
- Publisher: Imagine Software
- Platform: ZX Spectrum
- Release: UK: 1983
- Genre: Shoot 'em up
- Mode: Single-player

Zzoom is a computer game developed by John Gibson, Mark Butler and Steve Blower for the ZX Spectrum and released by Imagine Software in 1983. It is a combat flight simulator in which the player controls an aircraft to protect refugees from enemy forces.

== Gameplay ==
The object of the game is to protect a series of refugees from enemy aircraft, tanks and submarines. The player's view consists of a crosshairs upon a simple ground and sky horizon, with an altimeter, a shield indicator and a radar. Refugees walk along the horizon, and the player must fire his guns at enemy units to prevent them from killing the refugees. Score is gained by destroying enemy units, and for refugees crossing the screen safely.

However, due to a bug in the score calculation for refugees, should the player not allow any (or very few) refugees to survive a stage he will be rewarded with a bonus far in excess of what would be scored had the refugees been saved. To achieve this the player invariably has to shoot the refugees himself - which although not the point of the game can be just as challenging, as whilst doing this the enemy will still be launching missiles and shooting at the player.

== Reception ==
Zzoom was received well by the video game press when it was released in 1983, and it remained among the top twenty best-selling games well into 1984. Crash called it "a very memorable game and excellent value for money", whilst Personal Computer Games described it as "one of the all-time greats in a very competitive market".
