= Alchemist (video game) =

1983 video game

- Publisher: Imagine Software
- Programmer: Ian Weatherburn
- Artist: Paul Lindale
- Platform: ZX Spectrum
- Release: 1983
- Genre: Action-adventure
- Mode: Single-player

Alchemist is an action-adventure game that was released in 1983 by Imagine Software for the ZX Spectrum. The player controls an alchemist who can shapeshift into a golden eagle.

Alchemist was developed by Ian Weatherburn and Paul Lindale and was Imagine's first action-adventure. It was the first piece of software to be released on a gold-coloured cassette and box.

== Gameplay ==
In-game screenshot

The player controls an alchemist who has been summoned to defeat an evil warlock. The game is set inside the warlock's castle, where the primary objective is to find four pieces of a magic scroll. This allows the alchemist to use the "Spell of Destruction" to defeat the warlock.

The alchemist can transform into a golden eagle, requiring the use of spell energy. Transforming between the two is essential to completing the game. The alchemist can cast lightning bolts and other spells, but the eagle form is required to negotiate steep hills or drops. The alchemist can only carry one item at a time and must consume food to maintain stamina levels. Movement, bumping into objects, or transforming depletes the character's stamina. Fighting monsters also reduces the character's stamina, although this can be mitigated by carrying an axe or sword.

== Reception ==
Alchemist was released to positive reviews from critics. Reviewers drew comparisons to Atic Atac due to the similar atmosphere and playstyle. Sinclair User highlighted Alchemist's cartoon graphics and storyline. CRASH praised the presentation, graphics and "spooky organ tune". While the exploration of the castle was a major drawback for one reviewer, overall opinions about the game's addictiveness was mixed. In CRASH's 1984 retrospective, it was felt that the graphics in Alchemist, whilst detailed, had not aged well. The jerky scrolling, poor keyboard layout, and lack of replayability were also criticised. Your Spectrum highlighted the alchemist character's graphic, and his eagle transformation animation.
