= Cosmic Cruiser =

1984 video game

- Cassette inlay
- Developers: Steve Lavache; Simon Bell
- Publisher: Imagine Software
- Platforms: ZX Spectrum, Dragon 32, BBC Micro, Commodore 64
- Release: 1984
- Genre: Action
- Mode: Single-player

Cosmic Cruiser is a game developed by Imagine Software and released for the BBC Micro, Commodore 64, Dragon 32, and ZX Spectrum in 1984. The object of the game is to fight off an alien raiding party that has taken over a distant space station and save the crew.

== Gameplay ==
The player controls the astronaut, whose first objective is to navigate to the laser cannon and blast holes into the side of the space station through which he can enter. Once inside the space station the astronaut must locate and rescue any crew members, while avoiding hostile aliens.

== Reception ==
Reception

Review scores
| Publication | Score |
|---|---|
| Crash | 54% |
| Home Computing Weekly | 5/5 |

While Home Computing Weekly praised the "excellent sound, colour and graphics" and described it as a "fast and addictive game," Crash criticised a number of its elements, summing it up as "unplayable and very soon completely pointless."
