= B.C. Bill =

1984 video game

- ZX Spectrum cassette inlay
- Developer: Creative Technology Group
- Publisher: Imagine Software
- Designers: Eric the Bear, Steve Cain, Abdul Hafiz Ibrahim (ZX Spectrum) Marc Dawson (C64)
- Platforms: Commodore 64, ZX Spectrum, TRS-80 Color Computer, Dragon 32/64, BBC Micro
- Release: 1984
- Genre: Action
- Mode: Single-player

B.C. Bill is a 2D action video game published by Imagine Software in 1984. It was released for the Commodore 64, ZX Spectrum, TRS-80 Color Computer, Dragon 32/64 and BBC Micro.

== Gameplay ==
The player controls the eponymous B.C. Bill, a caveman, and must gather wives and enough food to feed his growing family, while avoiding predatory dinosaurs. Bill is armed with a club, which he uses to stun cavewomen and to kill a variety of roaming creatures. Smaller creatures may be dragged back to the cave as food, whereas larger dinosaurs will eat potential wives and food, and will kill Bill on contact. Bill can die from a broken heart if too many wives leave the cave, and from starvation if he is unable to provide enough food to feed himself and his family.

The seasons change, which affect the number and variety of food animals and also act as an internal gameplay timer: in spring, every wife who has food will produce a child, while in autumn any wife with no food will die and any child with no food will leave home.

== Development ==
B.C. Bill was developed in the UK by Creative Technology Group, and was published in the UK by Imagine Software in 1984 and in Spain by ABC Soft. Versions of the game were developed and released for the Commodore 64, ZX Spectrum, TRS-80, Dragon 32/64 and BBC Micro home computers.

The game was the last title published by Imagine, which was wound up in July 1984 due to unpaid debts of £10,000. Prior to the company's collapse Beau Jolly acquired the rights to market Imagine's games, so after the company's demise Beau Jolly took over marketing and distribution of B.C. Bill.

== Reception ==
Reception

Review scores
Publication	Score
Crash	73%
Computer and Video Games	8/10
Your Sinclair	3/5

The game received generally favourable reviews at release, with reviewers variously praising its graphics, sound and playability. Looking back at the game in 2010, however, Retro Gamer described it as "an exceedingly poor game".

While reviewers praised the gameplay, the game has been criticised by both contemporary and modern reviewers for its sexist subject matter, as a core element of gameplay involves the protagonist clubbing women and then dragging them by the hair into his cave to become his wife. Your Sinclair's (then Your Spectrum) Ron Smith speculated that this might have been deliberate on the part of Imagine, and Imagine's Tim Best appeared to confirm this, saying that he expected the "Greenham Common women" to take up residence outside Imagine's Liverpool offices.
