= Artillery Duel =

1982 video game

- ColecoVision box art
- Developer: Perkins Engineering
- Publisher: Xonox
- Programmers: Astrocade; John Perkins; Atari 2600; Mike Schwartz; VIC-20; Jerry Brinson
- Platforms: Astrocade, Atari 2600, ColecoVision, Commodore 64, VIC-20
- Release: October 1982: Astrocade October 1982 2600; NA: November 1983; EU: 1983 ColecoVision; NA: October 1984
- Genre: Artillery game
- Mode: Single-player

Artillery Duel is an artillery game originally written for the Bally Astrocade by Perkins Engineering and published by Astrocade Inc. in 1982. John Perkins wrote the game first in Astro BASIC, submitting it to The Arcadian, a monthly newsletter for Bally BASIC hobbyists published by Bob Fabris, from which it was adapted for the Astro BASIC manual. The game was first published in the May 19, 1980 issue of the Arcadian (volume 2, number 7), on pages 58 and 59.

Xonox published ports for the Atari 2600, ColecoVision, Commodore 64, and VIC-20. Artillery Duel was featured in double ended cartridges on the Atari 2600 with: Chuck Norris Superkicks,Ghost Manor and Spike's Peak.

== Gameplay ==

The game consists of dueling cannons on either side of a hill or mountain of varying height and shape. Each player has control of the incline and force behind the shell launched, the objective being to score a direct hit on the opposing target. Where many versions gave the player a few tries on the same course, Artillery Duel switches to a new mountain after each turn. When the player does manage to hit the opposing cannon, the reward is a brief animation of comically marching soldiers at the bottom of the screen.

== Reception ==
Danny Goodman, a contributing editor at Creative Computing Video & Arcade Games, said after visiting the summer 1982 Consumer Electronics Show that "the cleverest graphics award goes to Artillery Duel" for the Bally Astrocade, describing it as "really a graphics showpiece with a little bit of player interaction thrown in".

== See also ==
- Chuck Norris Superkicks
- Ghost Manor
