= Ah Diddums =

1983 video game

- Developer: Imagine Software
- Publisher: Imagine Software
- Designer: David H. Lawson
- Platforms: ZX Spectrum, Commodore 64
- Release: 1983: ZX Spectrum; 1984: C64
- Genre: Action
- Mode: Single-player

Ah Diddums is a computer game released by Imagine Software for the ZX Spectrum in 1983 and can be run on the 16KB/48KB versions of the machine and the Commodore 64 in 1984.

== Gameplay ==
The player controls a teddy bear who is trying to escape a toy box in order to comfort his crying baby owner. Teddy's job is to arrange building blocks in a certain order on the shelf at the top of the screen, allowing him to escape the toy box. On escaping one box, Teddy finds himself in another toy box, whose escape is more difficult; there are 99 toy boxes in total from which to escape.

== Reception ==
Ah Diddums won "Best Original Game" at the Computer and Video Games 1983 Golden Joystick Awards.
