= Xonox =

American game cartridge manufacturer

- Type: Subsidiary
- Industry: Video game publishing
- Founded: 1983
- Fate: Dissolved
- Products: Double-Ender
- Parent: K-tel Software Inc.

Xonox, a division of K-tel Software, was an American third-party manufacturer of cartridges for the Atari 2600, ColecoVision, Commodore 64, and VIC-20 in the early 1980s. Xonox was one of many small video game companies to fold during the video game crash of 1983.

== History ==
Xonox, based in Minnesota, started developing Atari cartridges during the height of the 2600's popularity. Xonox capitalized on the novelty and perceived value of "double-ender" cartridges. These could be inserted into the console on one of the two ends, each end offering a different game. Different double-ender configurations could package the same game with different counterparts. Xonox was not the first company to try this; Playaround did it earlier with their adult-themed titles. Xonox eventually abandoned this idea and began releasing single versions of some of the titles previously offered as double-enders as well as a few new titles.

== Games released ==
=== Atari 2600 ===
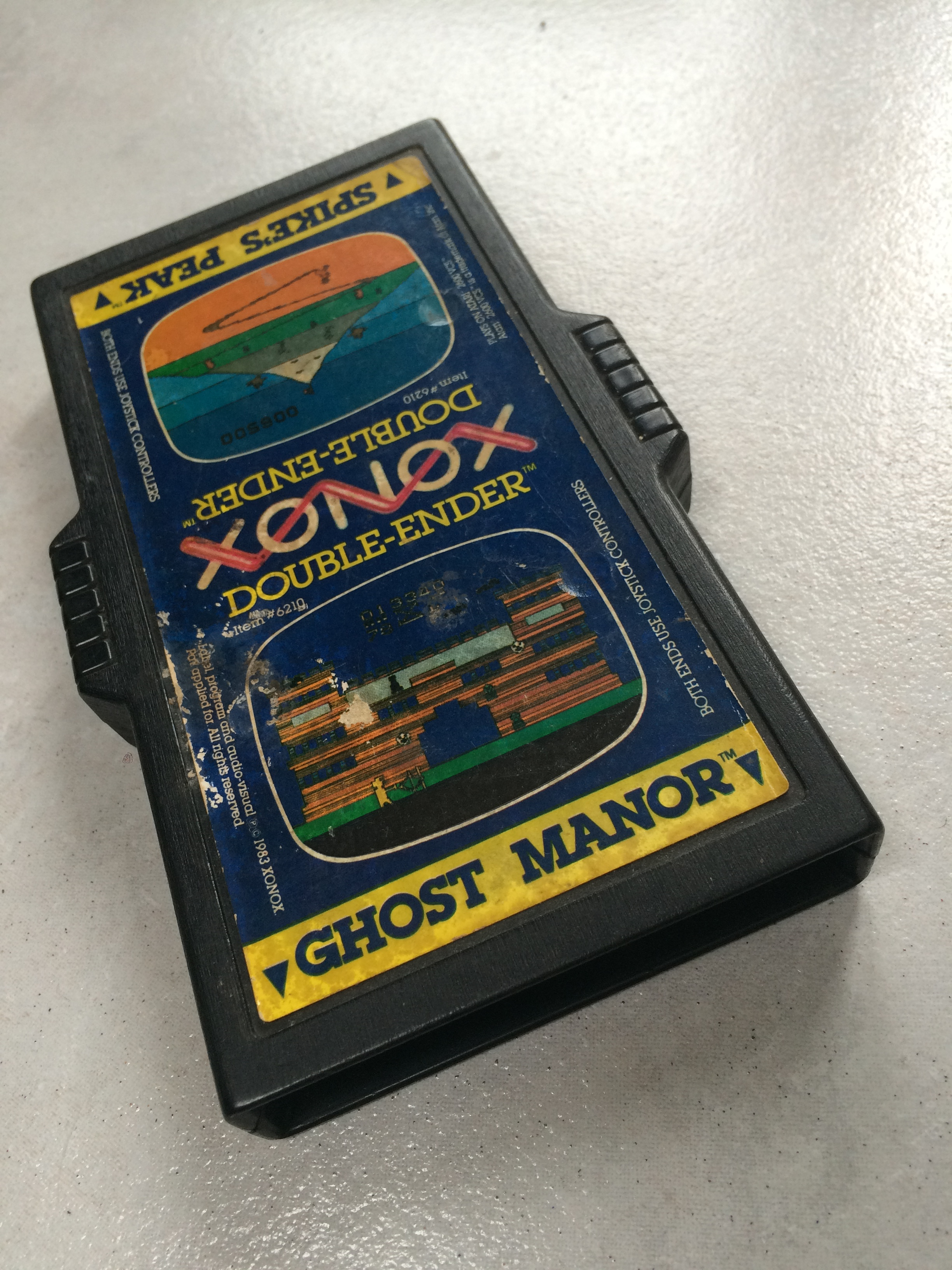
Xonox double-ender cartridge

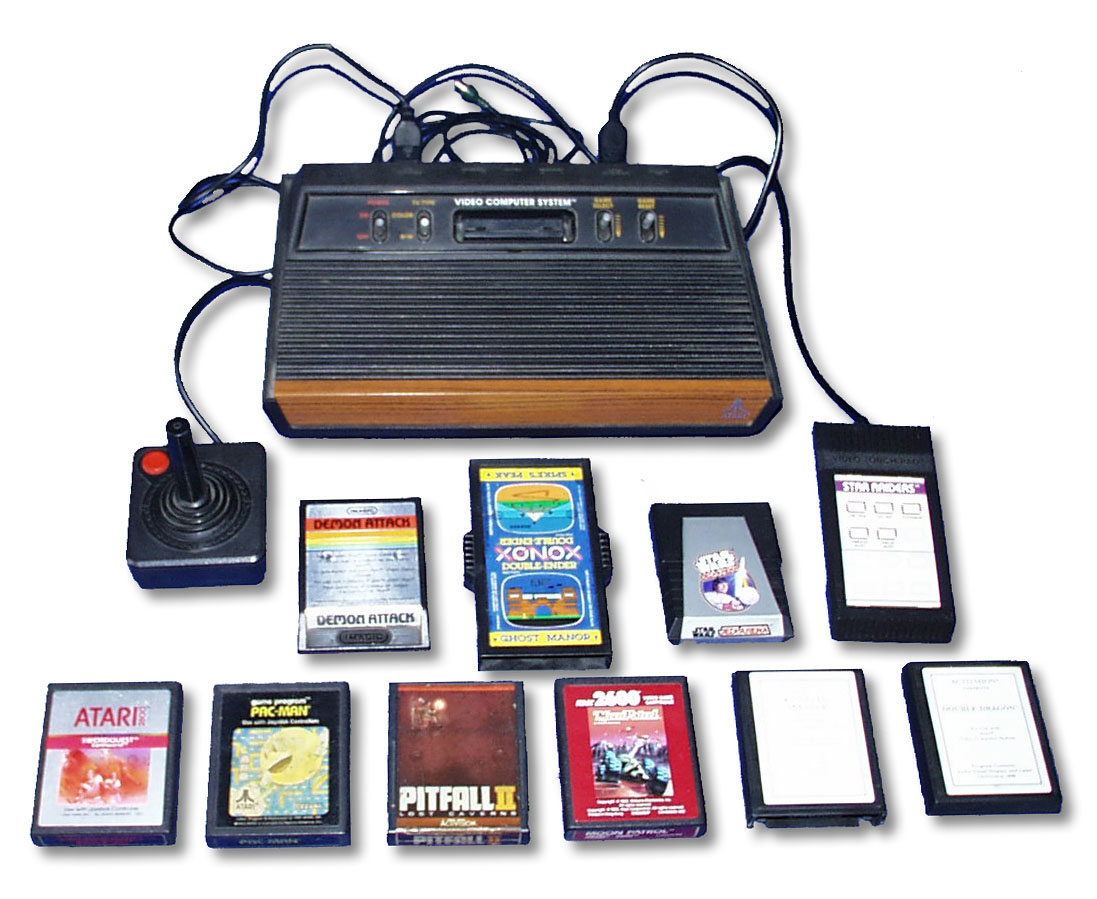
Xonox "double-ender" cartridge (top row, middle) compared to single title cartridges

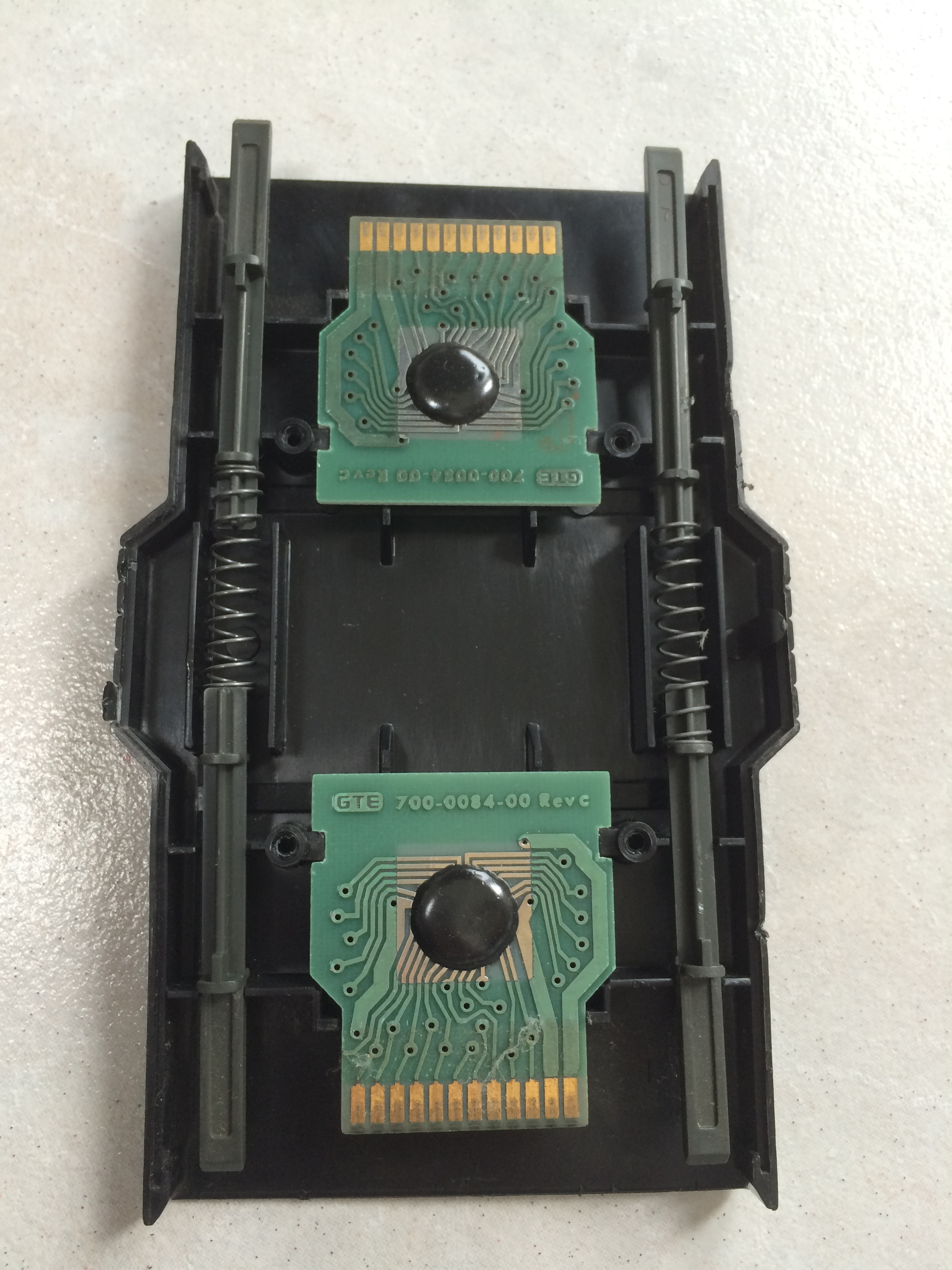
Inside view of a Xonox "double-ender" cartridge

==== Standard cartridges ====
- Artillery Duel
- Chuck Norris Superkicks
- Ghost Manor
- Motocross Racer
- Robin Hood
- Sir Lancelot
- Spike's Peak
- Tomarc The Barbarian

==== Double-enders ====
- Artillery Duel/Chuck Norris Superkicks
- Artillery Duel/Ghost Manor
- Artillery Duel/Spike's Peak
- Chuck Norris Superkicks/Ghost Manor
- Chuck Norris Superkicks/Spike's Peak
- Ghost Manor/Spike's Peak
- Robin Hood/Sir Lancelot
- Motocross Racer/Tomarc the Barbarian

=== ColecoVision ===
==== Standard cartridges ====
- Artillery Duel
- Chuck Norris Superkicks
- It's Only Rock 'n' Roll
- Motocross Racer
- Robin Hood
- Sir Lancelot
- Slurpy
- Tomarc the Barbarian
- Word Feud

==== Double-enders ====
- Artillery Duel/Chuck Norris Superkicks
- Motocross Racer/Tomarc the Barbarian
- Robin Hood/Sir Lancelot

=== Commodore Vic-20 ===
- Artillery Duel
- Chuck Norris Superkicks
- Ghost Manor
- Motocross Racer
- Robin Hood
- Sir Lancelot
- Spike's Peak
- Tomarc the Barbarian
