= Frenetic =

Frenetic may refer to:

- Frenetic (programming language), a domain-specific language for programming software-defined networks (SDNs)
- The Frenetic Five, a series of interactive fiction ("text adventure") games for a wide variety of platforms
- Frenetic Records, an independent record label

== See also ==
- Frenzy (disambiguation)
