= Ghost Manor =

1983 video game

- Developer(s): Xonox
- Publisher(s): Xonox
- Platform(s): Atari 2600, VIC-20
- Release: 2600; September 1983; VIC-20: NA: 1983; PAL: 1983
- Genre(s): Action
- Mode(s): Single-player

Ghost Manor is a horror video game released by Xonox in 1983 for the Atari 2600 and VIC-20. It was packaged in a double ended cartridge and a cassette tape along with one of three other games in an effort to appeal to budget conscious buyers who would purchase two games for the price of one cartridge and one cassette tape. There was also a more limited release of single ended cartridges and cassette tapes containing Ghost Manor by itself. The double ended cartridges and cassette tapes paired Ghost Manor with the platform game Spike's Peak, the fighting game Chuck Norris Superkicks, and a strategy game called Artillery Duel.

== Plot ==
Title screen

There are two options available to play as, the Girl or the Boy. The Girl is playable on both the 2600 and the 7800. If playing as the Girl character, the goal of the game is to rescue the helpless boy from Ghost Manor. To play as the Girl, the players must set the 2600's TV Type switch to "Color". The Boy is playable on the 2600 only. If playing as the Boy, the goal of the game is to rescue the girl from Ghost Manor. To play as the Boy, the players must set the 2600's TV Type Switch to "B/W" to play as the Boy. Atari 7800 users cannot play as the Boy, since the 7800 does not have a TV Type switch.

Neutral characters include Bones, an invincible skeleton in the graveyard, and Rainbow Ghost, a ghost who is otherwise identical to Bones.

The enemies present in Ghost Manor are the Spooks, the Chopping Mummy, and Dracula. Spooks are any of the eight beings flying around the Gate. They consist of two green scorpions, two white skulls, three black bats, and the black knight. In order to be defeated, they have to be attacked by Spears. The Chopping Mummy is the leader of the Spooks at the Gate and is found in the second stage of the game. He will try to stop the Boy or Girl from entering Ghost Manor. The Chopping Mummy is invincible until all of the Spooks are defeated. Contact with the Chopping Mummy's blade ends the game instantly. Once making it to the final stage, Dracula is met as the sinister being who guards the Prison (and the player's friend). He is vulnerable only to the Crosses found in the game. Contact with Dracula is lethal to the player character.

== Gameplay ==
The second state: The Gate

=== Items ===
Most of the items in Ghost Manor help the character out, but one will end the game.

- Hourglass: Counts down with the game timer. If the character cannot rescue their friend within four minutes, the game is lost.
- Spears: They are used to shoot down Spooks at the Gate, and also used to kill the Chopping Mummy. Only one spear is needed for each kill. Spear tokens appear to the left of the hourglass to indicate how many Spears have been collected, and a counter on the lower left indicates the exact number of Spears remaining.
- Lamp: Only present in the easy and medium difficulty settings, it is used to light the interior of Ghost Manor. Without it, the player must rely on lightning strikes to see.
- Cross: Used to repel Dracula, the players must press and hold the button during the last stage to use the power of a Cross, and release the button to stop using the Cross's power. Each Cross has about three seconds' worth of total usage before it is used up and disappears from the character's inventory. One Cross can be found in a coffin on Stage 3, and another Cross is hidden in a coffin on Stage 4. One bonus Cross is awarded when the character enters the Prison. Remaining Crosses are displayed to the right of the hourglass above where the Lamp appears if the character has the Lamp. The Crosses are hidden in different coffins each time the game is played.
- Moving walls: Found on Stage 3 and 4, touching these from behind will award points. Colliding with them while they are moving toward the character ends the game. Touching the stationary walls can momentarily paralyze the player, making the moving wall much more dangerous.

=== Scoring ===
Although winning or losing Ghost Manor depends on rescuing the character's friend, the game does keep score:

- 10 points are awarded along with each Spear in the Graveyard.
- Spooks are worth varying numbers of points.
  - The lower Scorpion is worth 800 points, and the upper Scorpion is worth 300 points.
  - The lower Skull is worth 700 points, and the upper skull is worth 600 points.
  - The lowest Bat is worth 500 points, the middle Bat is worth 200 points, and the highest Bat is worth 0 points.
  - The Chopping Mummy is worth 1100 points.
- Touching the trailing side of the moving walls awards points while contact is maintained.
- Searching coffins awards points as follows, even if no Cross is found. The number ranges from 100 to 10,000 points depending on how far away the moving wall is and which direction it is moving. Generally the closer the wall when it is moving toward the player, the more points are awarded.

=== Stages ===
The game consists of five stages:

In Stage 1 (the Graveyard) the player must guide their character around and touch Bones or the Rainbow Ghost a set number of times. In order for the contact to count, the contact must be made on a gravestone and while the player is moving. Each contact that meets these criteria awards the player a single Spear. The number of Spears that can be awarded depends on the difficulty setting of the game.

In Stage 2 (the Gate), the player must use the Spears to shoot down Spooks. When all seven Spooks are shot down, the player must use one final spear to shoot the Chopping Mummy. During this time, the Chopping Mummy will chop at the player in an attempt to touch the character with his blade and end the game. The Chopping Mummy does chop to a rhythm. Learning this rhythm enables players to avoid the Mummy's blade entirely with some practice. It is possible to run out of Spears. If that happens, the player cannot defeat any more Spooks or the Chopping Mummy, and the game will run until either the Chopping Mummy's blade comes in contact with the character or the player resets their console.

Stages 3 and 4 are nearly identical, but change the layouts and colors change. The player must move their character to the staircase in Stage 3, and then from one staircase to the other in Stage 4. Touching any of the stationary walls may stun the character. The character can press up against the trailing side of the moving walls to earn extra points, but touching the leading side of a moving wall will end the game. Players may search the coffins in these stages by touching them from the correct side. A tone is played for each successful search. One coffin in each stage contains a Cross, which is used to repel Dracula in the final stage of the game. If the character has a Lamp, the playfield will be illuminated the entire time the character is in either stage 3 or 4. If the character does not have a Lamp, the playfield will only be illuminated for brief periods when lightning strikes near Ghost Manor.

Stage 5 (the Prison) is where the final battle takes placeplayers must guide their character underneath Dracula and press the red button on their Joystick to force Dracula upward into one of the cells at the top of the screen. Players cannot force Dracula to move any direction other than up, but when Dracula is not being repelled he will follow the character left or right. To successfully restrain Dracula, players must use their character to bait him into moving underneath a cell, then press the button to force him upward into that cell. Repelling Dracula requires the character to have at least one Cross. Each Cross only lasts a few seconds, so players must keep the battle as short as possible. As soon as Dracula is restrained in either cell, the character's friend is released and will follow the character to the stairwell. Once both the character and their friend reach the stairwell, the player wins the game.

When the game is over, the Boy and Girl are both displayed in the Graveyard holding hands. If the rescue was not successful, both characters will sink into the ground along with the tombstones and Ghost Manor itself. The tune "Taps" plays during this ending. If the rescue was successful, the characters will remain standing in the Graveyard while everything else sinks. A "happy melody" plays for this ending. After a few minutes the game will restart automatically unless the power is turned off.

=== Difficulty settings ===
Difficulty settings in Ghost Manor affect how fast enemy characters move and whether or not the Lamp is available for use. At higher difficulties, fewer spears are awarded by Bones and/or the Rainbow Ghost. Each difficulty level is set as follows:

- Easy: Set both switches to the B position.
- Medium: Set the Left Difficulty switch to B and the right difficulty switch to A.
- Hard: Set the Left Difficulty switch to A and the right difficulty switch to B.
- Hardest: Set both switches to the A position.

On Sears Tele Games consoles the Difficulty Switches are called "Skill" switches. Expert is the same as the A position, and Novice is the same as B position. Further, on the Atari 7800, the difficulty switches are located on the front of the console between the controller ports. The players can slide the switch to the left for B position and to the right for A position.

== Release ==
Ghost Manor was originally intended to be released for the Atari 2600, ColecoVision, the VIC-20 and the Commodore 64, and licensed to third party software companies for release on other systems. The final releases, however, were only for the Atari 2600 and the VIC-20.

== See also ==
- Artillery Duel
- Chuck Norris Superkicks
