= Stonkers =

1983 video game

- Developer: Imagine Software
- Publisher: Imagine Software
- Designer: John Gibson
- Artist: Paul Lindale
- Platform: ZX Spectrum
- Release: 1983
- Genre: Strategy
- Mode: Single-player

Stonkers is a strategy video game for the ZX Spectrum published by Imagine Software in 1983. It was written by John Gibson with graphics by Paul Lindale. It has been called an early example of a real-time tactics or real-time strategy game.

== Gameplay ==
Stonkers is controlled either using keyboard or joystick. In the game, the player controls infantry, artillery, tank, and supply-truck units. Combat units consume supplies over time and the player must use the supply units to replenish them. Supply units are unloaded while a ship docks at the player's port. Information about ongoing events is displayed in a ticker tape on the bottom of the screen.

== Reception ==
It was awarded the title "Best Wargame" by CRASH in 1984.
