= Hercules (Seneca) =

Tragedy by Seneca

Hercules Furens
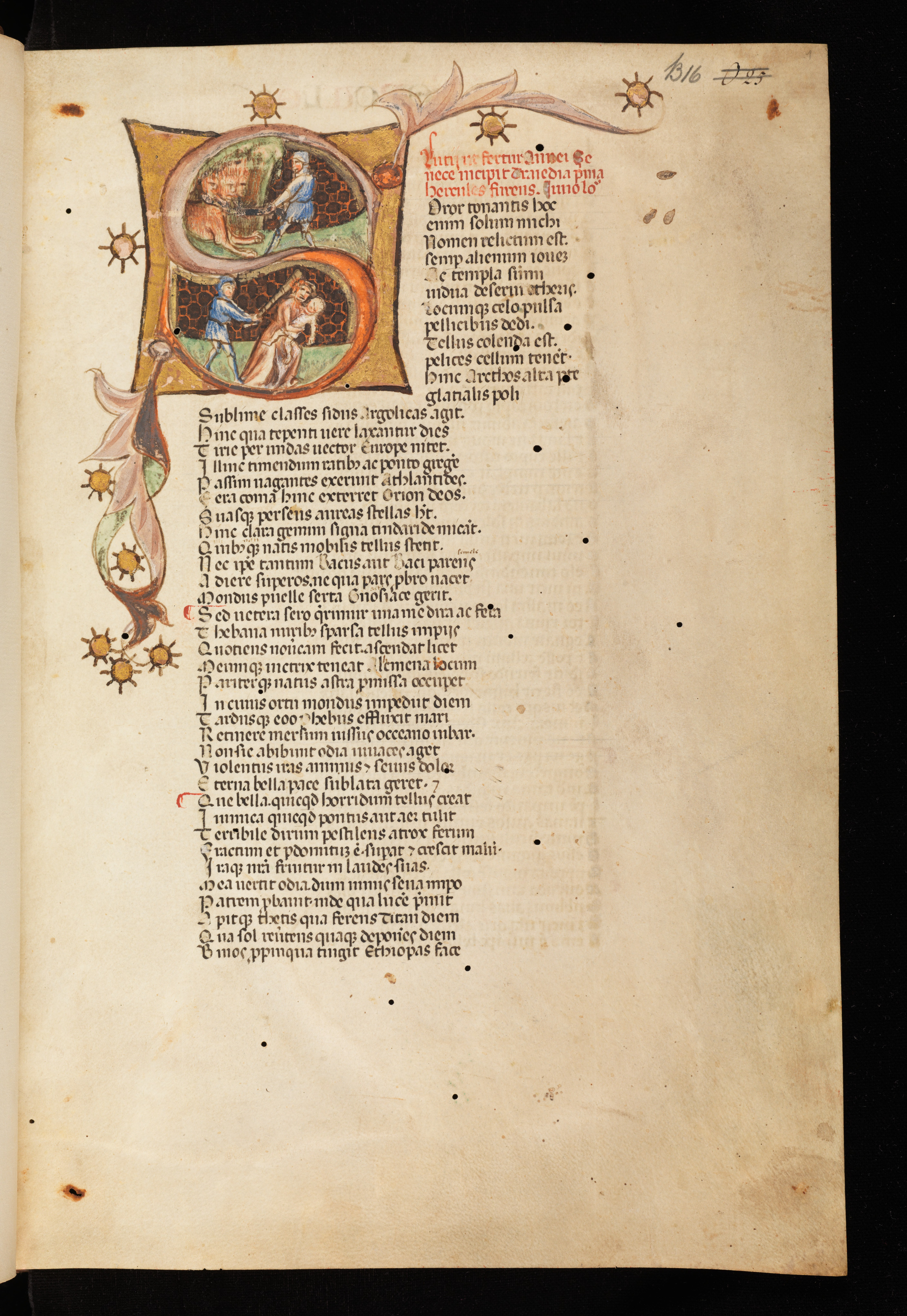
- First page of Hercules from a 15th-century Italian manuscript
- Author: Lucius Annaeus Seneca
- Language: Latin
- Genre: Tragedy
- Set in: Palace of Hercules at Thebes
- Publication date: 1st century AD
- Publication place: Rome
- Text: Hercules Furens at Wikisource

Hercules, or Hercules Furens ("Hercules Raging"), is a fabula crepidata of c. 1344 lines of verse by Lucius Annaeus Seneca.

== Characters ==
- Hercules, son of Jupiter and Alcmena, but the reputed son of Amphitryon
- Juno, sister and wife of Jupiter, and queen of heaven
- Chorus (of Thebans)
- Amphitryon, husband of Alcmena
- Megara, wife of Hercules and daughter of Creon
- Lycus, usurper of the throne of Thebes
- Theseus, King of Athens and friend of Hercules

== Plot ==
Lycus was exiled for his crimes by Creon the father-in-law of Hercules and king of Thebes. Hercules being at that time away in the underworld, where he had gone to seek out Cerberus as the final labour assigned him by Eurystheus through Juno's hatred. Here he found Theseus, who had made a descent into the regions of Pluto in company of Pirithous with the intention of carrying off Proserpine. Lycus seized his opportunity, and aided by conspirators, slew Creon together with his two sons, and usurped the Kingdom of Thebes.

=== Act I ===
Juno vents her anger at Jupiter's love affairs, concubines, and bastard offspring. She is enraged by the feats of Hercules, whom she determines to send into a state of mad frenzy upon his return from the underworld.

The chorus begins with a description of the dawn of day alludes to the customs of the times, condemning the pursuits and undertakings of the nobles. They reprove Hercules for his audacity in the attempting of his various labors, and extol the tranquility of a retired life.

=== Act II ===
Megara bewails the absence of Hercules, and complains of the violence and insolence of Lycus. Amphitryon pities the despondent state of Megara's mind, and offers his condolences.

Lycus, having slain Creon and his sons, has established himself on the throne and governs the kingdom. He seeks to marry Megara, using every stratagem, and threatens violence in case she refuses.

=== Act III ===
Hercules asks for the pardon of Phoebus and the rest of the gods for having brought Cerberus to the regions above, albeit in obedience to divine commands.

Hercules having returned from the underworld with Theseus encounters Amphitryon who greets him and informs him about events. Hercules goes off to kill Lycus. Theseus provides Amphitryon with an account of the underworld and the deeds of Hercules.

The chorus sings of the victory of Hercules gained in the underworld, and praises the hero.

=== Act IV ===
Hercules having returned after the slaughter of Lycus, as he is about to offer sacrifices to the gods whom he has invoked, becomes mad and under the influence of his madness, he kills his wife and children, and then falls into a deep sleep.

=== Act V ===
Hercules wakes, with his mind restored, and learns that he has killed his own children. He prepares to kill himself, but prevailed on, by the appeals of Amphitryon and Theseus, he refrains from suicide. At the suggestion of Theseus, Hercules accompanied by Theseus starts for Athens to undergo the ordeal of atonement for his mad acts.
