= Zip Zap =

1983 video game

- Cassette inlay
- Developer: Ian Weatherburn
- Publisher: Imagine Software
- Platform: ZX Spectrum
- Release: 1983
- Genre: Action
- Mode: Single-player

Zip Zap is an action game developed by Ian Weatherburn for Imagine Software and released for the ZX Spectrum in 1983.

== Gameplay ==
The player controls a robot sent to an unexplored planet called Hallucinor with the job of investigating it ahead of human colonisation. When it arrives, however, it is attacked by aliens and must manoeuvre its way through the planet, avoiding or killing the aliens, gathering fuel cells to remain powered, and escaping through teleportals to move on to the next level. The robot's circuitry has been damaged, however, so it cannot stop moving and has only limited braking power.

== Reception ==
Reception

Review scores
Publication	Score
Home Computing Weekly	5/5
Popular Computing Weekly	8/10

While Home Computing Weekly said that the game had "professional packaging, amazing graphics, thoughtful facilities and [was] well priced" and Sinclair User said that it was an "excellent arcade-quality game," Crash noted that it was below Imagine's usual standards and Simon Lane, reviewing for Popular Computing Weekly, criticised the game's difficulty, saying that it was "consequently frustrating to play".
