= Jumping Jack (video game) =

1983 video game

Jumping Jack / Leggit!
- Developer: Imagine Software
- Publisher: Imagine Software
- Designer: Albert Ball
- Artist: Stuart C. Ball
- Platforms: ZX Spectrum, Atari 8-bit, Dragon 32
- Release: 1983
- Mode: Single-player

Jumping Jack is a platform game designed by Albert Ball, with art by Stuart C. Ball, for the ZX Spectrum and published by Imagine Software in 1983. It was available for the Atari 8-bit computers and Dragon 32 under the name Leggit!. In these versions, Jack is renamed Leaping Lenny.

== Gameplay ==
Each level consists of a set of eight wraparound floors, across which holes scroll; when these holes reach the side of the screen, they move up or down to the next floor, depending on if they're scrolling to the left or right, respectively.

The goal in each level is to reach the top, by jumping through the holes; however, each time Jack jumps, a new hole is formed on a randomly chosen floor. Falling through a hole or miscalculating a jump and hitting the ceiling temporarily stuns him and leaves him vulnerable to a hole scrolling underneath him; if he falls all the way to the bottom of the level, he loses a life. Completing a level reveals a verse from the "Ballad of Jumping Jack"; the next level features an extra hole at the start and from the second level. One obstacle is added after each level. On the very first level there is no obstacle.
