= Arcadia (video game) =

1983 video game

- Spectrum cassette inlay
- Publisher: Imagine Software
- Designer: David H. Lawson
- Platforms: VIC-20, ZX Spectrum, Commodore 64, Dragon 32
- Release: 1983
- Genre: Fixed shooter
- Mode: Single-player

Arcadia is a fixed shooter published by Imagine Software for the ZX Spectrum and VIC-20 in 1983. It was later ported to the Commodore 64 and Dragon 32.

== Gameplay ==
Level 1 on the ZX Spectrum

Arcadia combines elements of Gorf and Galaxian. The player controls a space ship as the aliens scroll and move freely down the screen. The game consists of 12 different levels of descending aliens. After level 12 the game loops back to level 1 with no extra difficulty. An extra life is rewarded after every four levels. Advancing to the next level involves staying alive until the timer in the top left corner ticks from 99 to 0. Once zero is reached the surviving aliens descend rapidly down the screen.

Points awarded per alien destroyed are in line with the current level: Shoot down an alien on level 1 and you are awarded 1 point, roll around the levels and the same alien killed on level 13 is now worth 13 points.

== Ports ==
Early VIC-20 versions contain a bug causing aliens to stop appearing after the eighth level. This was fixed by the publisher.

The Commodore 64 cassette version has this warning on the loading screen: "Please wait 18 minutes for loading."

== Reception ==
ZX Computing said it was "highly addictive and well presented", Computer & Video Games said "it lives up to the advertisement blurb and gives you a good addictive game of Space Attack" - rating it 8 out of 10. Popular Computing Weekly were particularly impressed with the graphics, stating that they "have no equal in the Spectrum field," and "lift this game into a class of its own", rating it 86%.
