= Wacky Waiters =

1983 video game

- Cassette insert
- Developer: Imagine Software
- Designer: Eugene Evans
- Platform: VIC-20
- Release: 1983
- Genre: Platform
- Mode: Single-player

Wacky Waiters is a platform game written by Eugene Evans for the VIC-20 home computer. It was published by Imagine Software in 1983.

== Gameplay ==
Gameplay involves controlling a waiter from one side of the screen to the other and back again, hopping in and out of lifts, and trying not to spill the drinks tray he is carrying to the beckoning customer on the opposite side of the screen.
