= 3D Silicon Fish =

1984 video game

- Publisher: Thor Computer Software
- Platform: VIC-20
- Release: 1984
- Genre: Maze
- Mode: Single-player

3D Silicon Fish is a maze video game for the VIC-20 published by Thor Computer Software in 1984. It was developed in the United Kingdom.

== Plot ==
According to the instruction manual, the game takes place on Earth in the future where inhabitants are dependent on silicon for technology. Unfortunately, the silicon reserves are running out, but another source of silicon has been located in a faraway part of the galaxy. A mercenary going by the name of Sillo is sent to the dangerous area with a vehicle called the "silicon fisher" to gather the silicon and transport the cargo back to Earth.

== Gameplay ==
The game consists of a maze located above a stream that flows from the top to the bottom of the screen. The player navigates through the maze with the silicon fisher vehicle while looking for silicon that floats along the river. Collecting the silicon is done by positioning the vehicle towards the direction where the silicon is heading and throwing out a net to catch it. Every so often, an enemy called a "Kryllon" materializes in the air and explodes after a short time span. If the player is within range of the explosion, they will be killed.

As each level is completed, the speed of the game quickens along with more randomly appearing Kryllons. The colour of the levels change as the game goes on, and the music grows faster as the pace of the game accelerates.
