= Alpha Blaster =

1983 video game

- Developer: Sumlock
- Publishers: LiveWire Software; Aackosoft
- Programmer: Dave Aron
- Platforms: VIC-20, MSX
- Release: PAL: 1983
- Genre: Fixed shooter
- Mode: Single-player

Alpha Blaster is a fixed shooter video game developed by Dave Aron at Sumlock for the VIC-20 and published by LiveWire Software in 1983. Aackosoft published an MSX adaptation of the game in the following year.

== Gameplay ==
In Alpha Blaster, a derivative of Galaxian (1979), the player defends against an alien invasion fleet from the planet Alpha. Piloting a lone Federation battle cruiser, the player scores points by shooting flying saucers and other spacecraft with a laser cannon. The craft's laser energy and fuel are limited. After surviving two waves of attacks, the player must then dodge and blast through debris as the cruiser flies through an asteroid belt. If the player passes through the asteroid belt, the cruiser docks with a supply ship to rearm and refuel. After each such cycle, the game's difficulty level increases.
