= Frenzy (disambiguation) =

Frenzy is a 1972 film directed by Alfred Hitchcock.

Frenzy may also refer to:

- Rage (emotion), a feeling of intense anger

== Literature ==
- Frenzy, a 1997 novel by Percival Everett
- Frenzy, a 1988 novel by Rex Miller
- Frenzy, a 2014 novel by John Lutz
- The Frenzy, a 2010 novel by Francesca Lia Block
- "The Frenzy", a 2025 short story by Joyce Carol Oates
- The Frenzy (short story collection), a 2026 collection by Oates featuring the above story
- Joanna Cargill, a Marvel Comics supervillain also known as Frenzy
- Frenzy (DC Comics), a DC Comics supervillain

== Film and television ==
- Frenzy (1939 film), an Italian comedy film
- Torment (1944 film), a 1944 Swedish film written by Ingmar Bergman, also known as Frenzy
- Frenzy (2015 film), a Turkish film
- Frenzy (Transformers), a character from the Transformers universe
- Frenzy, an unrealized Alfred Hitchcock project
- "Frenzy" (2point4 children), an episode of 2point4 children

== Music ==
- Frenzy (Split Enz album), 1979
- Frenzy (Mojo Nixon album), 1986
- Frenzy (High Inergy album), 1979
- Frenzy!, a 2012 album by D'Prince
- "Frenzy", a 1957 song by Screamin' Jay Hawkins
- Frenzy (band), a pioneering psychobilly band from the UK

== Video games ==
- Frenzy (1982 video game), an arcade game manufactured by Stern in 1982
- Frenzy (1984 video game), a computer game published by Micro Power in 1984

== See also ==
- Frantic (disambiguation)
- Frenetic (disambiguation)
