= Chuck Norris Superkicks =

1984 video game

- ColecoVision cover art
- Developer: Xonox
- Publisher: Xonox
- Programmer: Rebecca Heineman
- Platforms: Atari 2600, ColecoVision, Commodore 64, VIC-20
- Release: NA: January 1984
- Genre: Action
- Mode: Single-player

Gameplay of Chuck Norris Superkicks

Chuck Norris Superkicks is a video game produced by Xonox in 1984. It was later sold as Kung Fu Superkicks and Super Kung Fu when their license to use the name of actor and martial artist Chuck Norris expired. The game was produced for the Commodore 64, VIC-20, Atari 2600, and ColecoVision as part of Xonox's double-ender cartridge line (cartridges with two games and two connectors that were flipped over depending on which one the user wanted to play).

== Gameplay ==
In Chuck Norris Superkicks, Norris must reach a monastery within six minutes. The player controls Chuck Norris on a vertically-scrolling overworld. Norris must walk along a path, and if he steps in the grass, time is lost at a faster rate. Warriors ambush Norris as he walks, causing him to enter battle.

While in battle, Norris faces three enemies, one at a time, who run back and forth and throw shurikens. If an enemy hits Norris, he is knocked down and vulnerable to attacks. If a shuriken hits him, the player loses time and Norris is sent back to the start of the path. Norris has three moves: punch, kick, and block which can be used by pressing the attack button while moving the stick in a certain direction. Pressing the button without moving the stick will make Norris do nothing. The block protects Norris from shurikens, while the punches and kicks must be chosen depending on which part of the enemy's body is exposed.

After defeating some enemies, Norris reaches a checkpoint and a split in the path, along with getting a new belt and an extra minute on the timer. At the next checkpoint, accessible after fighting more enemies and going further down the path, Norris unlocks a new attack that replaces the block and works against every enemy.

At the monastery, Norris fights multiple ninjas, who can turn invisible. The game ends when time runs out.

== Plot ==
Chuck Norris must reach an ancient monastery to rescue a famous leader being held hostage. Dangerous warriors lie in waiting to stop him.

== Reception ==
Computer Games reviewed the Atari 2600 double cartridge with Artillery Duel: "The game isn't quite as boring as Artillery Duel, but it's still far from exciting. Two games aren't better than one if they're both mediocre." Tilt reviewed the Atari 2600 version and gave the game a score of six out of six. TeleMatch gave the Atari 2600 version a score of four out six. AllGame reviewed the ColecoVision version and said that "[o]verall, Chuck Norris Superkicks is an uneven and sometimes laughable gaming experience." Strana Igr ranked the game as the second-best fighting game of 1983 behind The Attack of the Phantom Karate Devils. Retro Gamer, in a reader submitted column said: "I'm sure there are folk out there – folk willing to put the time in – who really enjoy this game, but for me, it's just not any fun."
