= The Attack of the Phantom Karate Devils =

1983 video game

- Developer: Phantom Software
- Publisher: Phantom Software
- Designer: John Orthel
- Platform: Commodore 64
- Release: 1983
- Genre: Fighting
- Mode: Single-player

The Attack of the Phantom Karate Devils is a video game developed by John Orthel for the Commodore 64 and published by Phantom Software in 1983. It is a single-player game, with a side view similar to modern fighting games. Using a joystick the player can move and perform various attacks fighting their way through four stages. It is one of the first martial arts games to include projectiles.

== Gameplay ==
The player uses the joystick to move and perform various attacks against ninjas and projectiles. Each time the character is hit they will lose some of their health, but they will also lose some health for every kick or punch they perform. The health can be restored by gaining enough points to earn a new promotion (Dan), or by making it to the next stage. There are four stages (temple, caverns, bridge and control room) the player can reach by earning enough points on the previous one. Jumping through the door at the end of each stage will earn bonus points.

The final stage appears broken, but is in fact how the designer intended it to look.

== Reception ==
Gregg Keizer praised graphics and new style of gameplay in Compute!'s Gazette volume 2, issue 8.
