= Tooth Invaders =

1981 video game

- VIC-20 cartridge
- Developer: Commodore International
- Publisher: Commodore International
- Platforms: VIC-20, Commodore 64
- Release: 1981: VIC-20; 1982: C64
- Genres: Action, educational

Tooth Invaders is a video game released by Commodore International for its VIC-20 home computer in 1981 and later for the Commodore 64 in 1982. It was developed in association with Camelot Marketing Group in order to positively reinforce the pros of brushing, flossing, and healthy dental care. Seen as a fun way to teach children the importance of dental care, players fight as "Plaqueman" to fight plaque using a toothbrush and dental floss. It was also made in association with the American Dental Association, released during National Dental Month, and supported by dentists.

== Gameplay ==
Using a toothbrush and dental floss, the player must keep the teeth clean while avoiding contact with the Plaque Germ, known as "D.K". If D.K. comes into contact with the player, this will result in loss of one life. The brush needs tooth paste to work so the player must apply tooth paste. Floss is used for the space between teeth. If the teeth aren't cleaned properly and start to decay a warning bell sounds. Eventually the tooth will disappear, reflecting tooth loss. If a tooth is completely cleaned, a brief musical score will play and the teeth will change colors repeatedly. If the player comes into contact with D.K. at this time, the Plaque Germ will disappear for a time. Losing all lives or having four teeth lost will end the game.

== Reception ==
Ready: A Commodore 64 Retrospective described it as a "simple game", a "standout" of Commodore's first generation of educational software, and a "pioneer in the serious games and games for health fields". However, the book also noted that the game aged relatively quickly due to the rapid improvement in game quality in the following years. Microcomputing considered the game an "excellent" example of how computer software could be used educationally to create behavioural change. Games Village wrote that behind the patently idiotic facade, it instead proves to be a balanced and enjoyable puzzle game.

The game was included in the "Open Wide! Tooth Toys That Made Us Smile" exhibit at the National Museum of Dentistry.

== See also ==
- Plaque Attack
- Tooth Protectors
