= Tooth Protectors =

1983 video game

- Developer: DSD/Camelot
- Publisher: Johnson & Johnson
- Platform: Atari 2600
- Release: 1983
- Genre: Action
- Mode: Single player

Tooth Protectors is a video game for the Atari 2600 video game console. It is an early example of an advergame, released exclusively via mail order in 1983 by American company Johnson & Johnson.

According to the AtariAge database, it is now very rare and sought after by collectors.

== Release ==
Released in 1983, Tooth Protectors is one of the earliest "advergames" or "promogames" – games with overt tie-ins to retail products – and one of several released that year for the Atari 2600 platform (others included M Network's Kool-Aid Man and Purina's Chase the Chuck Wagon.) Commissioned by Johnson & Johnson and developed by DSD/Camelot, it was the only game released for the Atari 2600 by either company.

The game was never given a traditional retail release, but was instead available exclusively to Johnson & Johnson customers who mailed in proof of purchase stamps to the company. Today it is considered rare and valuable; the game received a rating of 9 ("Extremely Rare") from the AtariAge rarity guide.

== Gameplay ==
Gameplay screenshot

The gameplay is similar to that of Activision's Kaboom!, in which the player must prevent objects dropping from the top of the screen from reaching the bottom by positioning their character directly under the falling objects. In Tooth Protectors, the objects are small "snack" squares dropped by the "Snack Attacker", a menacing-looking face that moves horizontally along the top of the screen. The player's character is a small smiling face carrying a strand of dental floss above its head. The player must prevent the snack squares from reaching the row of white teeth along the bottom of the screen; repeated hits by the snacks cause the teeth to blink and disappear from tooth decay.

Occasionally the Snack Attacker will dive from the top of the screen in an attempt to grab the player; the player loses a turn if the Snack Attacker succeeds. If teeth begin to decay, the player can press the joystick's fire button to call in the "Tooth Protectors": an orange toothbrush, green box of dental floss and purple dental rinse bottle move across the teeth, brushing, flossing and rinsing them.

The instruction manual included with the game ends by presenting "The Real Tooth Protectors": advertisements for Johnson & Johnson-branded toothbrushes, dental floss and dental rinse.
