= Frantic (video game) =

1983 video game

- Publisher: Imagine Software
- Designer: Eugene Evans
- Platform: VIC-20
- Release: 1983
- Genre: Shoot 'em up

Frantic is a VIC-20 space shoot 'em up published by Imagine Software on cassette in 1983.

== Gameplay ==
The player pilots a space ship while trying to keep an X and Y axis centered on the enemy, which enters the field of play at varying speeds and directions. Slower enemies appear horizontally and quicker enemies diagonally. The game's title alludes to the fact that the game is timed, as fuel levels deplete during play. Centering the X and Y axis to target enemies involves engaging thrusters which in turn burns fuel. The game can be played with either a joystick or keyboard.
