= Edge Games =

American video game developer and publisher

Edge Games, Inc.
- Formerly: Softek Software (1979–1983); Softek International Limited (1983–1990); The Edge Interactive Media, Inc. (1990–2005)
- Type: Private
- Industry: Video games
- Founded: 1979; 47 years ago
- Founder: Tim Langdell
- Headquarters: Pasadena, California, US
- Key people: Tim Langdell (CEO)
- Website: edgegames.com

Edge Games, Inc. is an American video game developer and publisher headquartered in Pasadena, California, best known for the practices of its founder and chief executive officer, Tim Langdell, in enforcing trademarks relating to the word "edge", which sources have described as "litigious".

In 2010, Edge Games sued Electronic Arts for trademark infringement, but eventually settled, with Edge surrendering many of its registrations. The United States Patent and Trademark Office (USPTO) cancelled the trademarks by court order in April 2013. Under the terms of its settlement, Edge Games may not register these trademarks again.

== History ==
Tim Langdell founded Softek Software, later incorporated as Softek International Ltd, in the UK in 1980. Softek's early games output for 8-bit computers such as the ZX Spectrum consisted mainly of simple clones of popular arcade games. These included Firebirds (Phoenix), Ostron (Joust) and Monsters in Hell (Space Panic) which reached the top 10 charts in 1983. The programmers working for Softek included Graeme Devine and Andrew Glaister who also produced Softek's Sinclair BASIC compiler, Super C. One of the conditions of using Super C was that Softek would be entitled to seek royalties on any commercial programs produced with it, which one reviewer described as "morally indefensible". According to Langdell, code produced by the compiler contained routines that were the property of Softek and that any programs produced using it were "not wholly the copyright of the writer that used the program". Softek went on to demand a 5% royalty from Silversoft for using the compiler to produce their Slippery Sid game.

In 1984, Langdell announced an offshoot of Softek called The Edge - a "creative group" of freelance artists, programmers and musicians. Quo Vadis was reported to be the "largest arcade-adventure yet seen on a micro" and was promoted with a prize of a gold and silver sceptre with an estimated value of £10,000 given to the first person to complete the game. The game was a number one hit on the Commodore 64 and £30,000 was added to the potential prize when sales of the game passed 100,000. Reviewers noted that many of The Edge's early titles lacked originality. Starbike was extremely similar to Lunar Jetman, Psytraxx drew unfavorable comparisons with Atic Atac and Brian Bloodaxe was a Jet Set Willy-style platform game. Fairlight, a number one game on the ZX Spectrum in 1985, originated in attempts to replicate the Filmation system used by Knight Lore. Programmer Bo Jangeborg later alleged that Softek withheld royalty payments for the game unless he signed up to produce further titles.

In 1986, Bobby Bearing received glowing reviews with many comparing it to Spindizzy and Marble Madness although the programmers stated that it was inspired by Knight Lore as well as the arcade game Q*bert. By the end of the year, the company had published their first officially licensed arcade conversion, Konami's Shao-Lin's Road (marketing it as the "follow-up" to Yie Ar Kung Fu), and Fairlight II was released to critical acclaim. It was later revealed that Fairlight II had been released without Bo Jangeborg's approval, and in an unfinished state with a number of bugs, one of which meant the game could not be completed. Further licensed titles were announced in 1987. Garfield: Big Fat Hairy Deal was the first video game based on Jim Davis' Garfield comic strip, a second Garfield game, Garfield: Winter's Tail, was released by The Edge in 1989. A new label, Ace, was created to publish conversions of Sega's Alien Syndrome and Taito's Soldier of Light and Darius. Darius was eventually published over two years later by The Edge under the title Darius +. Darius + saw the first introduction of a new logo for The Edge designed by illustrator Rodney Matthews who also produced the cover artwork for the game. The new logo only appeared on one more title from The Edge, The Punisher, based on the Marvel Comics' character of the same name. Planned for release on five different platforms only the Atari ST and Amiga versions were released. A trilogy of games based on the X-Men that had been announced in 1989 were never completed.

Edge Games, founded in California in 1990, acquired the intellectual property assets of Softek; they have released nine games since 1990.

== Trademark disputes ==
Edge Games has been involved in a number of disputes over trademarks connected to the word "edge".

=== Edge (iOS game) ===
In May 2009, French indie game developer Mobigame had their iOS title Edge removed from Apple's App Store in the US and the UK due to lawsuit threats by Tim Langdell. According to Mobigame, the dispute arose while they were trying to register a trademark for Edge in the US, while Langdell claims he owns the global trademark on "Edge".

According to the email dialogue between Langdell and Mobigame head David Papazian, shared with Eurogamer, Langdell delivered an ultimatum to Mobigame in exchange for a promise not to litigate. If they changed the game's name, he demanded 25% of the game's revenue for the time the title was on sale under the name "Edge", and if they licensed the Edge name, they would give him 10% of the game's revenue in perpetuity and subtitle it "An Homage To Bobby Bearing", with the Edge Games logo on the title screen. Papazian claims that he suggested the alternative title "Edgy", but that this was rejected by Langdell for being too similar to "Edge". Edge Games subsequently registered "Edgy" as a trademark. An Edge Games spokesperson, writing from Tim Langdell's personal email address and signing off as "Tim Langdell", claims that their registration was the result of a misunderstanding "probably in part caused by David Papazian's less than perfect English". However, many journalists who talked with David Papazian confirmed that Papazian's English is "absolutely flawless".

On June 18, 2009, it was reported that the game had been restored to the App Store with its original name intact, though later reports indicated that the game had once again been pulled in July 2009, and Mobigame confirmed that they had voluntarily withdrawn the game while considering their options. Mobigame's lawyer, speaking to Eurogamer, stated that "Mobigame's position is that the trademarks owned by Edge Games are not enforceable against Mobigame or any third party in respect of the distribution of the Edge game," because "there is unlikely to be any confusion or association between them and Mobigame's game" and those trademarks "are liable to be revoked".

Soon after, Edge Games published an "open letter" on its website claiming that several of the statements in the Eurogamer article were false. Mobigame's lawyers issued a response to the effect that the Eurogamer article is accurate and that Edge Games's rebuttal is false, and stated that they were gathering evidence to demonstrate that communications Edge Games claims, in its rebuttal, to have made did not actually occur.

The game was eventually put back on the App Store in UK and US markets on October 7, 2009, under the title Edge by Mobigame. Speaking with Kotaku, Papazian said, "On the legal side, (Langdell) cannot claim anything against "Edge by Mobigame" and Apple knows that, so we hope everything will be alright now."

On November 26, 2009, Edge by Mobigame was again removed from the App Store. An unnamed Edge Games representative stated "Adding 'by Mobigame' was determined not to get around infringement." On December 1, 2009, the game returned to the App Store under the name Edgy, but Mobigame soon removed it for fear that Langdell would use the legal precedent in his legal battle against EA.

In May 2010, the game returned to the App store under the name Edge. Mobigame had the following to say regarding the ongoing legal battle:

Thanks to us the word "edge" is now free to exist on the App Store like on any other marketplace, and games like Mirror's Edge, Shadow Edge, Killer Edge Racing or Edge by Mobigame can live on our iDevices.

=== Electronic Arts petition for trademark cancellation ===
Electronic Arts (EA) petitioned the United States Patent and Trademark Office (USPTO) to cancel a range of registrations associated with Edge Games and Future Publishing on September 11, 2009. EA stated that it had filed the petition because Edge Games had "continuously" threatened legal action with respect to the title of EA's 2008 game Mirror's Edge, and that the trademarks had either been obtained by fraud or abandoned through nonuse. Edge Games' Tim Langdell responded that Edge Games had not threatened EA with legal action, and that the two companies had been in amicable settlement talks over EA's use of the mark "Mirror's Edge" since late 2008. Langdell added that the 2008 federal court case Edge Games, Inc. v. Velocity Micro, Inc. had ruled that Edge had not obtained any of its trademarks by fraud, nor abandoned them through nonuse. Prior to filing their petition, EA voluntarily abandoned their application for the "Mirror's Edge" mark on September 8, 2009.

Edge Games filed a trademark infringement lawsuit against EA over the "Mirror's Edge" mark in June 2010. Almost a year later, and after a case in the UK court against Future, Langdell claimed that Edge Games filed the lawsuit against EA at the insistence of its trademark partner Future Publishing. Edge Games charged EA with engaging in willful infringement and unfair competition, and requested damages and a court injunction against further infringement. EA responded with a counterclaim to cancel Edge Games' trademarks, and argued that Edge Games obtained the trademarks based on fraudulent representations to the USPTO including doctored submissions of magazine covers and game boxes. EA added that the trademarks had not been in commercial use at the time of registration. The judge denied Edge Games' request for an injunction in October 2010, stating that Edge Games had abandoned use of its marks, misrepresented its case to the USPTO, and not shown their use of the trademarks to "legitimately extend beyond trolling various gaming-related industries for licensing opportunities."

EA and Edge Games reached a settlement in early October, where Edge Games would surrender the trademarks "edge" (registered twice), "cutting edge", "the edge", and "gamer's edge". No damages were awarded to EA or Edge Games, and each would pay their own legal fees. The settlement stipulated that neither party admitted fault or wrongdoing and that no party was found guilty of wrongdoing. On October 10, 2010, it was reported that the settlement had been approved by the judge, and a final order had been issued. The USPTO cancelled the five "Edge" trademarks on April 9, 2013.

EA disclosed the terms of the settlement to Microsoft Corporation in 2024, which in turn filed these as part of its defence against a trademark claim by Langdell. The settlement terms forbid Edge Games or any related entities from registering the aforementioned trademarks in any class, in any jurisdiction, at any point in the future.

=== Future Publishing breach ===
In 2011, it was revealed that Future Publishing, the publisher of game magazine Edge, had brought suit against Langdell in the United Kingdom for breach of contract, breach of copyright, and passing off through the use of the magazine's logo for Edge Games and his representations of his connection with the magazine. Future had licensed the trademark for the use of the word "Edge" in magazines from Langdell in 1993, when launching the magazine. The publisher bought the relevant part of the trademark from Langdell outright in 2005. In the intervening years, Future claimed, Langdell had co-opted the magazine's logo as his own, and claimed to have been involved in the creation or publication of the magazine. The action succeeded in all claims, in a decision that described Langdell's own evidence as "invention", "incredible", "totally unconvincing", and "concocted".

During the trial, Langdell claimed he invented the Edge logo in 1991, prior to the magazine's launch in 1993, and submitted a floppy disk from 1991 containing a file with the logo. However, Future's expert found the disk's contents were created using Windows 95. The judge summarized: "Dr Langdell concocted disk 1 in support of his claim that he had invented the EDGE logo in 1991. When this was exposed by the claimant's expert he constructed an elaborate explanation and created disk 3, having learned from the Report how to avoid the mistakes he made the first time."

In two lengthy missives sent to online games publications, Langdell indicated that he had lodged an appeal, placing the blame for his actions with Future and the responsibility for his loss with a "gullible" judge who had made "almost 100 errors of fact and law". Future, in turn, indicated that it had not been served with any new proceedings but had received permission to pursue contempt of court proceedings against Langdell.

Edge Games was ultimately denied permission to appeal. Subsequently, the company applied to have Future's UK trademarks assigned to it, with Langdell signing on behalf of both Future Publishing and Edge Games. This application was rejected.

=== Other ===
In 2001, Edge Games sought revocation of Namco's United Kingdom trademark "Soul Edge" (for the arcade game Soul Edge) for various reasons including an alleged similarity between the "Edge" and "Soul Edge" marks. The opposition failed on all grounds. Nevertheless, Namco had already decided to use the name Soul Blade for the PlayStation version in the United States and Europe to avoid potential complications, with the name Soulcalibur being used on all sequels for the same reason.

In March 2009, Cybernet Systems Corporation filed a lawsuit in Federal court against Edge. In the suit, Cybernet states that they were contacted by Tim Langdell beginning in January 2009 and that he asserted his ownership of the term "Edge." The suit also alleges that Langdell asserted his right to have the trademark for Cybernet's "Edge of Extinction" game assigned to Edge Games, and his further right to require Cybernet to enter into a paid license agreement with him due to their use of the name. Cybernet refused, and when Langdell threatened a lawsuit, Cybernet instead filed suit against Edge. "Edge of Extinction" was released in 2001, and is no longer an active game.

As of June 1, 2009, Edge Games applied for a US trademark for the phrase "Edge of Twilight." This is the name of an upcoming steampunk fantasy game that has been in development by Fuzzyeyes Studios for at least two years.

In addition, Edge Games has been a plaintiff in lawsuits with New World Computing over their title Planet's Edge, Marvel Entertainment over their titles Cutting Edge, Double Edge, and Over the Edge, Sony Entertainment over their PlayStation Edge, Edge Tech Corporation over their "The Edge" hardware, and the EdgeGamers online community. Edge Games' website also claims that the aforementioned Marvel comics, the movie The Edge and the games magazine Edge, among other properties, were all released under license from Edge Games, though it is not clear what, if any, involvement Edge Games or Langdell had in these products.

In 2014, Edge Games began a trademark case against the game peripherals company Razer Inc., regarding its Razer Edge gaming tablets. Edge Games filed an application for "SL8" in tablets in 2012, serial number 85704825, indicating that it would sell Windows 8 tablets at some point. The application was eventually denied. Langdell's subsequent attempts to trademark hardware under the "Edge PC" name were granted, along with "Edge Games," and "Edge Gaming PC" in 2019 and 2020.

In July 2009, members of the International Game Developers Association (IGDA) began circulation of a petition calling for a special meeting of the membership to vote on the removal of Langdell from that organization's board of directors citing, among other things, his use of his position on the IGDA to "work directly against the mission of the organization." In late August, the IGDA announced that a special meeting of the membership would be held on October 3, the sole purpose of which was to vote on whether Langdell should be removed, and on August 31, 2009, Langdell resigned from the IGDA board. Langdell had served on the board since March 2009. In a statement, Langdell said he resigned "with the best interests of the IGDA at heart". He stated he was confident that if a quorum was formed the vote would go in his favor, but feared that a quorum would not be attained and the "vocal minority" would not accept the outcome and continue to cause further disruption to the IGDA. On October 13, 2010, his IGDA membership was terminated due to his "lack of integrity or unethical behavior, as determined by the Board of Directors."

In the 2020s, despite prior legal defeats and settlements that barred further claims, Edge Games and Tim Langdell resumed trademark litigation activity. In 2022 and 2023, Langdell initiated cancellation proceedings against Lightfox Games and Microsoft Corporation at the United States Patent and Trademark Office (USPTO), asserting ownership over the "Edge" trademark in connection with video game software and services, despite prior abandonment and restrictions from the EA settlement. In both cases, Langdell alleged likelihood of confusion, dilution, and nonuse by the registrants.

In 2024, Edge Games also filed an opposition against a trademark application by Razer Inc. for hardware and peripherals bearing the "Edge" name. These actions were widely criticized by members of the industry as a continuation of Langdell’s pattern of trademark trolling, attempting to leverage long-abandoned rights to extract settlements or concessions from active developers and publishers.

Langdell’s continued assertion of rights over the "Edge" mark has led other parties, such as French developer Mobigame, to file petitions with the USPTO seeking cancellation of the remaining Edge Games trademarks, citing fraud, non-use, and violation of the 2010 EA settlement, which barred Langdell from re-registering or asserting these marks.
