= Spindizzy (disambiguation) =

Spindizzy is a 1986 puzzle video game.

Spindizzy may also refer to:

- Spindizzy, an alternate name for a tether car
- Spindizzy (Cities in Flight), a fictional starship propulsion system
- Spindizzy Worlds, a 1990 puzzle video game and sequel to Spindizzy
