= Fairlight =

Fairlight may refer to:

In places:

- Fairlight, East Sussex, a village east of Hastings in southern England, UK
- Fairlight, New South Wales, a suburb of Sydney, Australia
- Fairlight, Saskatchewan, Canada

In other uses:

- Fairlight (company), an Australian producer of synthesizers then digital audio tools
  - Fairlight CMI, the first digital sampling synthesiser
- Fairlight (group), a Commodore 64, Amiga and PC demo group, as well as a warez group
- Fairlight (video game), a 1985 computer game by Bo Jangeborg, published by The Edge
  - Fairlight II (video game), the 1986 sequel also known as "Fairlight II: A Trail of Darkness"
- Fairlight (ferry), a Sydney to Manly ferry that operated between 1878 and 1914

== See also ==
- Fairlight Cove, a small village on the East Sussex coast
- Fairlight Glen, a nudist beach on the East Sussex coast
