= Bobby Bearing =

1986 video game

- Publisher: The Edge
- Designers: Robert Figgins; Trevor Figgins
- Platforms: ZX Spectrum, Amstrad CPC, Commodore 64
- Release: 1986
- Genre: Action-adventure
- Mode: Single-player

Bobby Bearing is an isometric action-adventure game released by The Edge in 1986 for the ZX Spectrum. It was ported to the Amstrad CPC and Commodore 64 by Trevor Inns.

== Plot ==
Bobby and his family are ball bearings who live in Technofear, "a land of the future made of steel, and inhabited by things of steel." Bobby's brothers have been led astray by their rogue cousin and are now lost in the Metaplanes outside their home - stunned and captured by the evil Bearings that inhabit the Planes.

== Gameplay ==
The player controls Bobby Bearing in his search for his four lost brothers and their cousin. He must avoid the evil Bearings, find his missing and unconscious relatives, and roll them out of the Metaplanes to safety.

The mission must be accomplished before the time limit runs out, otherwise the game ends and Bobby's relatives are lost forever. A time penalty is incurred each time Bobby dies or is stunned. If Bobby is trapped and unable to leave a screen, pressing 'Q' will reset the screen at the cost of a time penalty.

Air vents, Elevators, switches, crushers and evil Bearings can help or hinder Bobby in his quest.

== Development ==
Robert Figgins and Trevor Figgins, the developers:

It's hard to believe now so many months after the project began, but Bobby Bearing began life as an action-packed arcade-style game inspired by Q*bert! In fact originally it wasn't intended for commercial sale at all. Even though the game didn't have much resemblance to Q*bert, we were really pleased with the final result. The funny thing is, though, that there was no sense in which Bobby was based on Marble Madness, or any home micro game such as Gyroscope, and especially not Spindizzy! Bobby was more than 50% finished and looking very much as it does in the final commercial version almost a year ago now, and was around 18 months in the making. In fact we hadn't heard of Marble Madness and Spindizzy until we spoke to The Edge. In fact, acknowledgements for inspiration are really due to Knight Lore by Ultimate.

== Reception ==
Reception

Review scores
Publication	Score
Amtix	93%
Crash	94%
Computer and Video Games	37/40
Sinclair User	5/5
Your Sinclair	9/10
Zzap!64	93%

Award
Publication	Award
Crash	Smash

Bobby Bearing was positively received by critics. The game debuted at number nine on the sales charts in October 1986. The Spectrum version was rated number 46 in the Your Sinclair "Official Top 100 Games of All Time" list.
