= Joust (disambiguation) =

Jousting is a medieval sport.

Joust or Jousting may also refer to:

== Arts, entertainment, and media ==
- Joust (novel), by Mercedes Lackey
- Joust (video game), a 1982 arcade game
- Ostron, a 1983 video game also known as Joust
- Joust (1989–1996, 2008), a duel in the US version of the television series Gladiators
- Joust, an event played in the UK/Australia television series Gladiators

== Other uses ==
- Joust (roller coaster), an attraction at Dutch Wonderland
- Sea jousting, a water-based sport
