= Fairlight II =

Fairlight II may refer to

- Fairlight II (video game), a computer game released by The Edge in 1986
- Fairlight CMI Series II, a synthesizer
