= Inside Outing =

1988 video game

- Developer: The Edge
- Publishers: EU: The Edge; NA: Epyx
- Designer: Michael St. Aubyn
- Platforms: ZX Spectrum, Amstrad CPC, Commodore 64, Atari ST, Amiga
- Release: 1988
- Genre: Action-adventure
- Mode: Single-player

Inside Outing is an isometric action-adventure game released by The Edge in 1988 for the ZX Spectrum, Amstrad CPC and Commodore 64. In 1989, it was released for the Atari ST and Amiga with the title Raffles with the 8-bit versions re-released with this name. It was released in the U.S. by Epyx as Devon Aire in the Hidden Diamond Caper.

== Plot ==
An eccentric millionaire has died without leaving a will, instead hiding his money and gems in obscure places around his large house. His widow has hired a professional thief to find and retrieve these items. However, the dead millionaire's strange pets have now overrun the mansion and do not take kindly to interlopers.

== Gameplay ==
Inside Outing uses the Worldmaker graphic development system that was pioneered by The Edge's 1986 game, Fairlight. The player controls a thief, named "Raffles" in some versions of the game and "Devon Aire" in others, who must explore a large mansion looking for valuables, while avoiding the various hostile creatures that inhabit the house.

== Reception ==
Reception

Awards
Publication	Award
Sinclair User	SU Classic
Your Sinclair	Megagame

- Sinclair User: "You may be surprised at just how intimidating a canary can be... Without a doubt, the best 3D game since Head Over Heels."
