= Empire! =

1986 video game

- Dogfighting with an alien ship in Empire!
- Developer: Andrew Glaister
- Publisher: Firebird Software
- Platforms: ZX Spectrum, C64, Amstrad CPC
- Release: 1986
- Genre: Strategy / Action
- Mode: Single Player

Empire! is a space combat and trading video game designed by Andrew Glaister and published by Firebird Software in 1986 for the Commodore 64, ZX Spectrum, and Amstrad CPC.

== Gameplay ==
The player is the pilot of a spacecraft, set during a period of early space colonization. There are 64 star systems to explore, presented in a rotating top-down 2D view. Each system has a starbase – which issues missions, receives supplies from the player, and sells various ship add-ons – a sun that presents a navigation hazard due to its high temperature, and one or more orbiting planets.

The player can navigate his ship onto a planet's surface through a warp hole (and a tunnel-maneuvering subgame). Once there, three different supplies can be collected in a first-person flight subgame. The three supplies – people, minerals and radioactives – are then made available for pick-up in the main playing area and can be transferred back to the starbase.

Players must also defend themselves from constant attacks from enemy alien ships.

Adjacent star systems can be flown to through an asteroid field (represented by square blocks).

Eventually, the player is able to create a vaccine to combat a plague, which destroys systems 200 stardays from infection. The player can eventually purchase better ships and starbases to form their own empire. The last task of the game is to deploy a defence shield network to secure the player's empire from invaders.

== Critical reaction ==
The game's retro sci-fi graphics have drawn comparisons with Flash Gordon and Asteroids, but games magazines noted that underlying this is a complex game, similar to Elite, requiring a varied range of skills.
