= Monsters in Hell =

1983 video game

- Publisher: Softek
- Designer: Martin Lewis
- Platform: ZX Spectrum
- Release: 1983
- Genre: Platform
- Mode: Single-player

Monsters in Hell is a ZX Spectrum game written by Martin Lewis and released by Softek in 1983. The player kills wizards by digging holes in the floor to watch them plummet to their death. The screen layout and gameplay are similar to the 1980 Universal arcade game Space Panic.

== Gameplay ==
Gameplay

Title screen

== Reception ==
CRASH magazine wrote:

This game has wandered off the "Panic" theme to some degree. You play the part of a small, jerk-moving man who is equipped with a pick for digging holes. Six platforms give the game quite a height and these are connected by various lengths of thin ladders. Monsters (vampire types) are tiny, but they do home in on you very quickly — good job you've got nine lives! There is no monster bashing in this game (boring) the monsters being killed merely by their falling through a hole (or holes) in the platform — although this doesn't always kill them....

The magazine did not recommend the game, stating it "gives the impression of being out of date" with its "small, jerky character graphics" and "lack of sound and not much use of colour".
