= Kinesoft =

Defunct American video game company

- Formerly: Apriori Software
- Industry: Video games, Software
- Founded: 1991
- Founder: Peter Sills
- Fate: Acquired by Microsoft
- Successor: Microsoft

Kinesoft Development Corporation was an American video game development company founded by Peter Sills in 1991. The firm, based in Illinois, had about 22 employees as of 1997. Mark Achler joined the company in 1994 to serve as president. Along with Director of Technology, Andrew Glaister, Sills developed the concept which became known as Exodus, a video-game development environment for Windows 95. Andrew Glaister took this concept and developed it.

Exodus caught the attention of IBM, Intel, Sega, and Microsoft. Microsoft then used the basic concepts and their relationship with Kinesoft to develop a new set of technologies called DirectX which now forms the basis of all gaming under Windows. Subsequently, Kinesoft's port of Pitfall: The Mayan Adventure was the first commercial game release for Windows 95 and was touted by Bill Gates at that year's COMDEX tradeshow as the launch of the new DirectX technologies for Windows 95, but the game itself does not use DirectX technology. Other Exodus platform games included Windows ports of Earthworm Jim and Gex.

== Lawsuit against SoftBank and dissolvement ==
Kinesoft Development Corp. v. Softbank Holdings
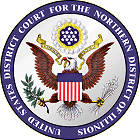
- Court: United States District Court for the Northern District of Illinois
- Citations: Kinesoft Development Corp. v. Softbank Holdings, 139 F.Supp.2d 869 (N.D. Ill. 2001-02-16).

Court membership
- Judge sitting: Sidney I. Schenkier

On 25 May 1995 Kinesoft and SoftBank entered into the "Game Porting Agreement". Under the terms of that agreement, SoftBank was to provide Kinesoft with a certain number of console games to be "ported" to a PC platform; the "porting" involves translating pre-existing video games from the console platform to the personal computer platform. The games were to be published by GAMEBANK Corporation, a joint venture company established by SoftBank and Microsoft to bring console titles to Windows 95 for the Japanese marketplace by using its unique talents and tool-sets to convert existing Sega Genesis titles. In the US, some of these ports were published by Interplay. These ports were later expanded to include Nintendo and some early Sony PlayStation titles as well.

Following this, Kinesoft had sued SoftBank for breach of the Game Porting Agreement, and SoftBank admitted that it had not provided Kinesoft with the agreed upon number of games. This led to a settlement agreement in 1997 where Kinesoft released all claims against SoftBank Corporation under the Game Porting Agreement. Following that, on 17 November 1999, Kinesoft Development filed a lawsuit in US District Court for the Northern District of Illinois, Eastern Division against its SoftBank Holdings Inc. and SoftBank Corporation for breach of SoftBank's obligations under the 1997 settlement agreement, where SoftBank was required to pay $10 million between 12 June 1997 and 10 October 1998. The case was to go forward in a trial set on 1 June 2001. Eventually it dissolved soon after the trial in 2001.

== Products ==
In addition to games development, Kinesoft also released WinCD, a software CD player, and the film It's a Wonderful Life on CD-ROM for Windows 3.1.
