= Apple Panic =

1981 video game

- Publishers: Broderbund; Funsoft (TRS-80)
- Programmers: Apple II; Ben Serki; Atari 8-bit, IBM PC; Olaf Lubeck; TRS-80; Yves Lempereur
- Platforms: Apple II, Atari 8-bit, IBM PC, VIC-20, TRS-80
- Release: July 1981: Apple II; 1982: Atari 8-bit, IBM PC, VIC-20, TRS-80
- Genre: Platform
- Mode: Single-player

Apple Panic is a video game for the Apple II programmed by Ben Serki and published by Broderbund Software in 1981. Apple Panic is an unauthorized version of the 1980 Universal arcade game Space Panic, the first game with ladders and platforms. While the arcade original remained obscure outside of Japan, Apple Panic became a top seller for the Apple II. Versions for the Atari 8-bit computers, VIC-20, IBM PC (as a self-booting disk), and TRS-80 were released in 1982.

The player is pursued by creatures which can be eliminated by digging holes to trap them, then hitting them with a shovel. The red and green aliens of Space Panic are labeled "apples" in Apple Panic, but are visually similar.

== Gameplay ==
The player controls a character that walks left and right along platforms made of green brick and climbs up and down ladders between them. The player can use a shovel to dig holes through the platforms, into which enemies will fall and become trapped. Once an enemy is stuck in a hole, the player must strike it repeatedly with the shovel until it falls through and hits the level below. This must be done quickly, because after about 17 seconds an enemy will be able to free itself, filling in the hole in the process. The player can also refill holes they've dug, or drop through them.

There are three types of enemy in the game, the first and most numerous being the "apples". An apple will die if it falls at a single level. As the player advances, green and blue enemies will start to appear, which must be dropped through at least two or three levels, respectively. This is accomplished by digging a series of holes, one directly below another, and trapping the enemy in the uppermost hole. The player earns extra points if they drop one monster on top of another (killing them both).

On each level, the player has only a limited time to dispatch all the enemies, tracked by a bar at the bottom of the screen. There are four distinct configurations of platforms and ladders through which the game cycles, but in every one there will always be five platforms in which the player can dig.

== Ports ==
Ports for the Atari 8-bit computers and IBM PC (as a self-booting disk) were done by Olaf Lubeck, who also wrote Cannonball Blitz for the Apple II. A TRS-80 version was programmed by Yves Lempereur and published by Funsoft.

== Reception ==
In contrast to Space Panic's lack of success in North American arcades, Apple Panic debuted in July 1981 and sold 15,000 copies by June 1982, appearing on Computer Gaming World's list of top sellers. Softline reported in 1983 that it was among the top 30 best-selling Apple software for almost two years, in contrast to the "two to four month life span" of the typical arcade game. Electronic Games described Apple Panic in 1983 as "deliciously true to" the gameplay of Space Panic.

Dick McGrath reviewed the game for Computer Gaming World, and decided that the game gets a 4 on a scale of 1 to 10, and stated that "After playing Time Runner, Apple Panic creates a deja-vu, I've-been-here-before."

Byte in 1982 called it "one of the most creative and novel games to be invented for a microcomputer". PC Magazine in 1983 stated "Yes, Apple Panic is a pretty dumb game. It's also fun to play and pretty to watch ... a welcome change from the endless stream of shoot-em-ups in space".

Owen Linzmayer reviewing the TRS-80 version for Creative Computing wrote, "The Apple Panic packaging promises voice and sound effects. This is a bit misleading. The only time the computer speaks (through the AUX port), is when it displays the banner page. At this time, it says only two words, 'Apple Panic'." He concluded, "Apple Panic from Funsoft may be well on its way to the top of the charts." Computer Games magazine gave the VIC-20 version a B rating, noting that it is "a slightly revised version" of Space Panic and stating that it is "better than the Apple game."
