= Space Panic =

1980 video game

- ColecoVision port box art
- Developers: Universal; CBS Electronics (CV)
- Publishers: Universal; Coleco (CV); Casio (PV-1000)
- Platforms: Arcade, ColecoVision, PV-1000
- Release: November 1980: Arcade; 1983: PV-1000, ColecoVision
- Genre: Platform
- Modes: Single-player, multiplayer

Space Panic (スぺース・パ二ック, Supesu Panikku) is a 1980 arcade video game developed by Universal. Presented in a side view, the player digs holes in horizontal platforms to trap pursuing aliens, then eliminates them by hitting them with a shovel. A port to the PV-1000 by Casio and a ColecoVision version by CBS Electronics were both released in 1983.

Predating Nintendo's Donkey Kong, and lacking a jump mechanic, Space Panic was the first game involving climbing ladders between walkable platforms. The genre was initially labeled "climbing games" and "ladder games", but by the late 1980s became known as platform games.

The original arcade game was commercially successful in Japan, but an obscure release in North America. A 1981 clone, Apple Panic, available before any official home versions, became a top-seller on the Apple II and was ported to other home computers. There were over a dozen Space Panic clones for home systems, often with "panic" in the title. Lode Runner (1983) later put its own spin on climbing and digging, a lineage which eventually took on the name puzzle-platform games.

== Gameplay ==
The player hits a trapped alien with a shovel. Two aliens roam free.

The main character can move along platforms and climb the ladders between them. The goal is to dig holes in the platforms and lure aliens into them. Hitting a trapped alien with the shovel knocks them out of the hole and off the screen. In later levels, two or more holes must be lined up vertically in order to dispose of stronger aliens.

There is a limited supply of oxygen, which acts as a timer.

== Development ==
The game's development team included Kazutoshi Ueda, who later designed Lady Bug (1981) and Mr. Do! (1982) at Universal and then Bomb Jack (1984) and Tehkan World Cup (1985) at Tehkan (later known as Tecmo).

The game's concept was inspired by Heiankyo Alien (1979), also known as Digger, a top-down maze game with digging and trapping mechanics. Space Panic changed it to a side-view gameplay format, while adding platforms and ladders.

== Reception ==
In Japan, Space Panic was commercially successful. It was tied with Scramble and Jump Bug as the 14th highest-grossing arcade video game of 1981. In North America, Space Panic was commercially unsuccessful, which Electronic Games in 1983 attributed to its concepts' novelty to the audience: "not only the first of the climbing games, it was also the first of the digging games. That's quite a load for a player on a new game. No punning intended when I say that the rungs were too high for the average gamer to scale." The magazine reported that the average play time was 30 seconds.

In a retrospective review of the ColecoVision version for Digital Press Online, Kevin Oleniacz concluded, "Coleco had resurrected several short-lived arcade games and transformed them into home favorites, but they should have let Space Panic rest in peace."

=== Reviews ===
- Games #41
- Games #44

== Legacy ==
While the original arcade game was unsuccessful in North America, the concept found popularity in the unauthorized home computer version, Apple Panic (1981), which was more successful than the original game in North America. It also inspired Lode Runner (1983), which has a similar look and also uses the basic premise of digging holes to trap enemies.

Universal revisited the genre with Mr. Do's Castle (1983), which expanded upon the play styles explored in Space Panic.

Video game historian Michael Thomasson, writing for Old School Gamer Magazine, considers Space Panic to be the "foundation of all platformers" despite being "a rather obscure" cult classic, stating that it "revolutionized game design by introducing novel game mechanics and birthed a new genre." It was also one of the earliest "digging" type games (after Heiankyo Alien), which are variously called "trap 'em up" or "digging games".

The creator of Chuckie Egg, Nigel Alderton cites Space Panic as a particular inspiration, noting the similarity in graphics including colour scheme.

Horace and the Spiders (1983) includes a Space Panic inspired level.

=== Clones ===
First Published	Name	Company	System(s)
1981	Apple Panic	Broderbund	Apple II, Atari 8-bit, IBM PC, TRS-80, VIC-20
1982	Alien Panic	Nufekop	VIC-20
1982	Monsters	Acornsoft	Acorn Electron, BBC Micro
1982	Panic	Visions Software Factory	ZX Spectrum
1982	VIC Panic	Bug Byte	VIC-20
1983	Monsters in Hell	Softek Software	ZX Spectrum
1983	Bonka	J. Morrison (Micros) Ltd.	Dragon 32/64, C64
1983	Color Panic	Spectral Associates	TRS-80 Color Computer
1983	Cuthbert Goes Digging	Microdeal	TRS-80 Color Computer, Dragon 32
1983	Panic 64	Interceptor Micros	C64
1983	Sam Spade	Silversoft Ltd	ZX Spectrum
1984	Panic Planet	Alligata	C64
1984	Hektik	Mastertronic	C64, VIC-20, Commodore 16, Plus/4
1984	Roland Goes Digging	Amsoft/Gem Software	Amstrad CPC
1984	Psychiatric	Sprites Software	Oric 1, Oric Atmos
1986	Panik!	Atlantis	Commodore 16, BBC Micro, Acorn Electron, Atari 8-bit
