= Switchball =

2007 video game

- Developer: Atomic Elbow
- Publisher: Vivendi Games (Note: Released under the Sierra Online brand name.)
- Platforms: Windows, Xbox 360 (XBLA), PlayStation 3 (PSN)
- Release: Windows; June 26, 2007; Xbox 360; November 7, 2007; PlayStation 3; September 17, 2009
- Genre: Puzzle
- Modes: Single-player, multiplayer

Switchball is a 3D action-puzzle game, made by the Swedish developer Atomic Elbow, which was released for Microsoft Windows on June 26, 2007, on Xbox Live Arcade for the Xbox 360 on November 7, and on PlayStation Network for the PlayStation 3 on September 17, 2009. A HD version of the game was released on Steam on May 17, 2021.

== Gameplay ==
Gameplay screenshot

The game puts the player in the role of a ball, which is guided through various courses suspended in mid-air in five different environments: Skyworld, Iceworld, Caveworld, Cloudworld and Lavaworld, each one having six courses.

Each course contains multiple puzzles for the player to solve. The ball is used to push around objects and activate switches, among other things. Using PhysX as its core physics engine, the game features many physics-based puzzles. Obstacles, traps, and other objects are common throughout the game. Some common objects include boxes, switches, fans, cannons, magnets, and rails.

The ball can be morphed into four different forms, each one having unique traits. The Marble Ball is the default ball that every level starts with, and it has no special traits. The Steel Ball can push heavy objects around. The Air Ball can be inflated in order to float for a short period of time. Lastly, The Power Ball can be charged to have one of three abilities: a dash ability, a jump ability, or a magnetism ability. Each ball reacts to the environment in different ways; For example, Steel Balls will tear cloth platforms and be drawn to magnets, while Air Balls are very easily blown by fans and can be popped by nails.

Each level is timed, and players are rewarded with gold, silver and bronze medals, depending on how quickly they complete the level. A scoreboard is available for each level, displaying the top seven players who completed the stage the fastest.

== Development ==
Originally called Crazy Ball, the game won "Best PC Game" during the 2005 Swedish Game Awards and was a finalist in the "Technical Excellence Class" during the 2006 Independent Games Festival. Crazy Ball was developed in five months.

The gameplay is similar to Atari's 2004 game Ballance, but features worlds instead of levels.

== Reception ==
Reception

Review scores
Publication	Score
Computer and Video Games	7.9/10 (Windows)
Eurogamer	7/10 (Xbox 360)
GameSpot	7.5/10 (Xbox 360)
GamesRadar+	8/10 (Windows)
IGN	8.4/10 (Xbox 360)
PlayStation Official Magazine – UK	6/10
Official Xbox Magazine (UK)	7/10
Official Xbox Magazine (US)	8/10 (Xbox 360)
Play	75% (Playstation 3)
TeamXbox	9.4/10 (Xbox 360)

GamesRadar awarded the PC version of Switchball 8 out of 10, praising the AGEIA physics engine, commenting that "the rolling and bumping and knocking and flinging are all exquisitely well done. And physics, the best thing to happen to games since explosive barrels, has a way of making you care". Team Xbox awarded the Xbox 360 version a 9.4 of 10 and called Switchball as one of the best puzzle games for Xbox Live Arcade. IGN commended the AGEIA physics engine, calling it a major star of Switchball.

CVG criticized the difficulty of the later level puzzles in its review of the PC version: "It doesn't run out of brains, but in later chapters it does succumb to that misguided urge to crank up the pressure. This goes badly. Switchball is a thoughtful puzzle game, but neither its camera nor controls are up to the dexterity-driven tasks it sets here".

== Xbox Live Arcade re-release ==
Switchball was re-released on March 26, 2008, on Xbox Live Arcade with a patch that enhanced graphics and tweaked the scoring.

== See also ==
- Marble Madness
- Ballance
- Kula World
- Neverball
