= Spindizzy Worlds =

1992 video game

- Developer: ASCII Entertainment
- Publishers: Activision; ASCII Entertainment (SNES)
- Platforms: Amiga, Atari ST, SNES, X68000, NEC PC-9801
- Release: Amiga 1990; Atari ST 1990; SNES: JP: August 7, 1992; NA: February 1993; EU: April 1992
- Genre: Puzzle
- Mode: Single-player

Spindizzy Worlds is a puzzle video game published by Activision, released on the Amiga and Atari ST in 1990. It was later released on the Super Famicom in 1992 and the Super Nintendo Entertainment System in 1993 by Ascii Entertainment and on the X68000 and the NEC PC-9801 in 1992 by Arsys Software as Spindizzy II. The game is a sequel to the 1986 video game Spindizzy. Like its predecessor it uses an isometric view, and the player controls a spinning top-like robotic device named GERALD, a Geographical Environmental Reconnaissance And LandMapping Device, that is tasked with exploring and mapping a star system before it is destroyed.

== Plot ==
Eons ago, stellar matter was blown up into several pieces following the eruption of the belly of the Sun. One of those flaming parts moved at extremely fast speed towards a planetary system, the Beta Twirlinus. A collision occurred, leading to what was left of the stellar piece as well as two clusters. One cluster had 23 planets, the other seven. The planets were found by astronomers in the 23rd century and are known as the Spindizzy Worlds. They had unnaturally fast orbiting speeds, as well as odd inhabits, geographic formats, and very high energy stores; since the planets were found, change climates and an increase in natural disasters in planets of the Solar System were explained by a odd connection between the Solar System and the Spindizzy Worlds.

In the 24th century, the Solar System planets are nearly out of energy. Earth's League of Nations, Mars' Federated Martian Colonies, and the United Moons of Jupiter send the unnamed player character to the Spindizzy Worlds to obtain jewels with lots of energies in them. Throughout the game's 15 stages, the player traverses inside a GERALD (Geo-Graphic Environmental Reconnaissance and Landmapping Device), which spins rapidly to counteract the planets' fast rotations. GERALD runs on energy, meaning jewels must be collected to keep the machine running.

== Gameplay ==
Atari ST gameplay

GERALD has limited controls only being able to move around with the use of braking and accelerating; there is no jumping, attacking or other actions. The player must guide the device through several levels. There are many hazards, enemies, and puzzles based on finding and pressing switches in the correct order, navigating thin pathways without falling off, and finding all gems dotted about a section. GERALD cannot jump on its own, but can reach higher platforms and traverse large gaps by accelerating and jumping over slopes or ramps, or using moving platforms, warps or platforms that make it bounce. GERALD's health, called fuel, is full at the beginning of each level and it depletes slowly over time especially with quick movements. Falling from a height onto a surface, falling off the bottom of a stage, or contact with enemies and hazards also takes away health, but it is replenished in small amounts after finishing a section of a stage and by collecting gems that are found around most levels. Some levels contain enemies, but they only hinder the player's progress and do not have to be defeated to progress and can be avoided. The stages can be viewed from four different camera views at 90° angle rotation from each other and the player has manual control over the camera view; views of objects and paths may be obscured behind other platforms in some views, and easier seen in others.

To start, the level select screen has two clusters or star systems, Easy and Hard, named Easydizzy and Spindizzy in the SNES version. The harder system contains more complex levels and a higher number of levels than the easier system. In both clusters, planets represent levels, and although the player has a choice of which to level to play, the easier outer planets must be completed before the harder inner planets can be selected. The central star is the final stage and can only be selected after all the others are beaten. The levels are all individually named and may have a distinct visual or gameplay style. In the SNES version, once a level has been completed, the planet will explode and the level cannot be revisited; the player is then given a password.

== Development and release ==
ASCII developed Spindizzy Worlds for Atari ST and Amiga home computers. Prior to release, the game was marketed as Spindizzy II. A year and half after the home computer releases, a port for the Super Nintendo Entertainment System (SNES) console released in April 1992. While Paul Shirley, the developer of the original Spindizzy, was against converting the game to the SNES, Activision proceeded without his approval. In retrospect, Shirley commended ASCII on the technical effort in getting the game running on the Nintendo console but ultimately considered the port an "absolute disaster". He noted that Activision UK closed down soon after receiving the game's final master copy and source code, which he attributes to the limited release of 80,000 units primarily in the United Kingdom.

== Reception ==
Reception

Aggregate score
Aggregator	Score
GameRankings	74.50%

Review scores
Publication	Score
ACE	AMI: 890/1000; AST: 880/1000
Aktueller Software Markt	8/12
Amiga Format	94%
Amiga Power	5/5
Computer and Video Games	90/100
Electronic Gaming Monthly	30/40
Game Players	8/10
GamePro	18/20
GameZone	4/5
Nintendo Power	12.6/20
Raze	70%
ST Format	91%
Total!	91%
Video Games (DE)	75%
CU Amiga	81%
The One	88%
Power Play	86%

The game was ranked the 13th best game of all time by Amiga Power. Nintendo Magazine System gave the game an overall score of 90/100 stating “An excellent update of a genuine classic, and a long-lasting game that stands head and shoulders above any other SNES puzzlers.” Super Gamer reviewed the SNES version and gave an overall score of 89% stating: "A massive and very tough test of joypad reactions and brains which you'll love or hate." In 1995, Total! ranked the game 90th on their Top 100 SNES Games stating: "Based on the old classic Marble Madness this takes the whole concept much further."
