= Firebirds (video game) =

1983 video game

- Developer: Graeme Devine
- Publisher: Softek
- Platform: ZX Spectrum
- Release: 1983
- Genre: Fixed shooter

Firebirds is a fixed shooter for the ZX Spectrum developed by Graeme Devine and published in 1983 by Softek. It is a clone of the 1980 arcade video game Phoenix.

== Reception ==
Gameplay screenshot

CRASH: "A classic Phoenix. Fire rate and left/right movement are the best we’ve seen. Beautiful graphics featuring red Firebirds, blue Bombers, and white Weavers in an intricate dance of death. 100 percent machine code. Very difficult to get to see the mothership, but worth it! Highly recommended."

Sinclair User: "The game could have been reasonably good if more attention had been paid to detail. Perhaps it would be a good idea for Softek to forget about compiler games and produce something in pure machine code. The games may be easy to produce but they are not so much fun to play"
