= Andrew Glaister =

British video game programmer (born 1967)

- Born: 4 July 1967 (age 59); Marlow, England
- Occupation: Video game programmer
- Writing career
- Period: 1981
- Website: www.glaister.com

Andrew Glaister (born 4 July 1967) is a video game programmer.

He initially started programming games on the ZX81 and ZX Spectrum between 1981 and 1987, forming a company called Programmers Development Systems Ltd.

Andrew then worked as a developer for Viacom New Media, Kinesoft Development and FASA Interactive in the United States. When Microsoft Game Studios acquired FASA in 1999, Andrew continued to work for them as a Development Manager, in later years particularly for the Windows Graphics and Gaming team working on Direct X 10, display drivers and other features for Windows Vista.

== Work history ==
Andrew first started playing with electronics at age 10, and had built his first computer at age 12. This was a simple design based on the SC/MP 8060, in a wooden box with 8 LEDs, 8 input switches and 32 bytes of RAM from 4 74LS89 16x4 chips.

=== Sinclair projects ===
In 1980 he acquired his first 'real' computer, a Microtan 65, and spent time using his friend's ZX80.

In 1981 his parents purchased a ZX81 for Andrew, and within months he began selling his own games. This was done at first through one of the first computer stores in England–the Buffer Micro Shop in Streatham. Duplication was performed on C15 cassette tapes after school, with photocopied inserts. He managed four or five duplications a night, selling each for ten pounds. Andrew would then go by train from Crawley to Streatham and return with his profits. After meeting an employee from Silversoft in the shop one day, Andrew decided to let that company publish the games instead.

1982 saw the release of the ZX Spectrum. Glaister's first program for Silversoft was the video game Orbiter, which sold 30,000 copies over Christmas. He started working with Softek (later EDGE Games), writing a number of games such as Ostron.

Using the money from those games, Andrew purchased an Osborne 1 and started to use Z80 assemblers to try to produce code for the Spectrum. He also used the built-in 300 baud modem to play (with friends Jez San and Fouad Katan) a new game called MUD - Multi User Dungeon, remotely logging into Essex University. Andrew is credited for becoming the second external 'Wizard' in the game (Jez San of Argonaut Games being the first.)

In the late 80s, he worked on the development of an early IBM PC clone, the Apricot PC. It was sold under the name Programmers Development Systems Ltd., a company founded with Jacqui Lyons and Fouad Katan. Due to the Apricot's programming tools and connectivity with home computers like the ZX Spectrum, Commodore 64 and Amstrad CPC, it became popular with many developers, such as Richard Aplin and the Oliver twins.

During this time he was writing both Spectrum ports (of Konami games Jail Break and Salamander for example) and original games (Empire!).

In 1989 Andrew moved to Vancouver after joining Mission Electronics as their lead firmware engineer, to help develop the first MCA laptop. In 1992 he joined Icom simulations in Illinois, working on the official development system for the TurboGrafx-16.

=== Windows projects ===
In 1994 Icom Simulations was acquired by Viacom New Media. Andrew was retained and he worked on several projects such as Beyond Shadowgate and art and programming tools for many console games. During this time Andrew met Peter Sills and Mark Achler. Together they worked on converting console games to Windows as Kinesoft Development. Their conversion of Pitfall, Pitfall: The Mayan Adventure, was published in time for the launch of Windows 95. This game was then used by Bill Gates at the E3 prior to the Windows 95 launch to show off the 'Direct X Gaming Technologies' in Windows, even though Pitfall contained no DirectX technology.

These conversions led to a Windows 95 'gaming shell' called Exodus Technologies and other emulation technology. Kinesoft was approached by a number of companies to buy or license the technology, eventually signing a deal with GameBank, a company set up by SoftBank and Microsoft to bring console titles to Windows. Kinesoft, expanding, had 30 employees at its peak, and Andrew was now developing as part of a full team rather than a sole programmer.

== Selected list of games ==
=== ZX Spectrum ===
- Meteoroids (1982), Softek Software
- Orbiter (1982), Silversoft Ltd
- Ostron / Joust (1983), Softek Software–a Joust clone
- Legend (1984), Century Software
- Scuba Attack (1984), Century Software
- Warlords (1985), Century Software–another Joust clone
- The Fourth Protocol (1985), with Electronic Pencil Company for Hutchinson Computer Publishing
- Tachyon Command (1985), Century Software
- Empire! (1986), Firebird Software
- The Comet Game (1986), Firebird Software
- Jail Break (1987), Konami–Spectrum port of the arcade game
- Salamander (1987), Konami–Spectrum port of the arcade game

=== Windows 95 ===
- Pitfall: The Mayan Adventure (1994), Activision
- Earthworm Jim (1995), Shiny Entertainment
