= Brian Bloodaxe =

1985 video game

- Publisher: The Edge
- Designer: Charles Bystram
- Programmers: ZX Spectrum; Charles Bystram; C64, Amstrad; Trevor Inns
- Platforms: ZX Spectrum, Commodore 64, Amstrad CPC 464
- Release: 1985
- Genre: Platform
- Mode: Single-player

Brian Bloodaxe is a British platform game written by Charles Bystram for the ZX Spectrum and released by The Edge in 1985. It was ported to the Commodore 64 and Amstrad CPC 464 by Trevor Inns.

== Plot ==
In Brian Bloodaxe, a Viking hero named Brian Bloodaxe wakes from an ice block in which he has been trapped for hundreds of years. Upon discovering that the year is now 1983 he decides to do what he originally set out to achieve — the conquering of Britain. Working his way through more than 100 screens of platform mayhem, Brian's ultimate goal is to steal the Crown Jewels and seat himself upon the British throne.

== Gameplay ==
Brian Bloodaxe plays as a platform game with some simple "collect and drop objects" aspects. Although Brian has to dodge most of the game's varied and often surreal enemies, some of them can be killed either by headbutting them thereby stabbing them with the horns of his helmet, or using weapon objects found in the game - axe, bomb and pistol.

The game is notable for its esoteric humour which was strongly influenced by the humour of sketch comedy series Monty Python's Flying Circus, its in-game music (The "Liberty Bell March" by John Philip Sousa, better known to most as the Flying Circus theme tune), and colourful graphics.

== Reception ==
The game polarised critics on different platforms. It impressed many, scoring 86% in CRASH, 3 out of 3 "hits" in Your Spectrum, and 8/10 in Sinclair User, but Zzap!64 were unimpressed by the Commodore 64 conversion which they felt had not been altered sufficiently from the original version to take advantage of the machine's technical abilities. It was awarded an 18% overall rating and described as "very disappointing".
