= Bonka =

1983 video game

- Developer: J. Morrison Ltd.
- Publisher: J. Morrison Ltd.
- Programmer: J. Morrison
- Platforms: Commodore 64, Dragon 32
- Release: NA: 1983
- Genre: Platform

Bonka is a clone of the 1980 arcade video game Space Panic. It was released for the Dragon 32 and Commodore 64 in 1983.

== Gameplay ==
Title screen

The game takes place on several floors connected by ladders. Monsters appear on all floors. The player character is able to dig a hole in any floor. A monster falling down the hole becomes trapped for a short time. If the player then hammers at the monster while it is trapped, the monster is killed.
