= Ballance (video game) =

2004 video game

- Developer: Cyparade
- Publishers: Atari Europe, Ziggurat Interactive
- Designer: Klaus Riech
- Composer: Mona Mur
- Engine: Virtools
- Platform: Microsoft Windows
- Release: EU: 2 April 2004; NA: 25 October 2006
- Genre: Puzzle
- Mode: Single-player

Ballance is a 3D puzzle video game for Microsoft Windows. It was developed by German studio Cyparade, published by Atari Europe, and first released in Europe on 2 April 2004. The gameplay is similar to Marble Madness, in that the player controls a ball via keyboard, moving it along a course while trying not to fall off the screen.

== Gameplay ==
Screenshot from level 6

In the game, the player controls a rolling ball and must guide it throughout the game's 13 levels (12 levels originally; another downloadable level, level 13 "Speed", was available on the developer's homepage). It can be transformed into a wood, stone, or paper ball via specialized transformer pads, which give the ball varying weights, affecting gameplay.

The wooden ball is very stable and can be used for several puzzles in the game. The player initially launches into and leaves all levels with a wooden ball.

The stone ball is extremely heavy, and can be accidentally rolled off an edge very easily, but can easily push down specific objects like boxes and other balls. Furthermore, rolling a stone ball through a bridge made of planks will make the bridge collapse.

The paper ball is very light and struggles to push objects. Its surface is not smooth, unlike the wooden and stone balls, and so its movement is slightly variable. A paper ball can be blown into the air by ventilators and can roll up steep hills easily.

Two power-ups are available. If the ball rolls into them they provide either an extra ball or extra points. Checkpoints are scattered evenly across levels so that if a player falls off the course they only have to restart the game from the last checkpoint reached.

The 12 levels progress in difficulty throughout the runtime. On occasion, the player has to push other balls down slopes and holes or onto rails to continue rolling along the path. Each level requires the player to complete physical challenges, which often involve puzzles about physics or routing. The side-rail is introduced in level 3, requiring the player's ball to roll on its side along two rails which are aligned vertically one above the other. In level 12, the player's ball has to balance on the center of the mono-rail, which is composed of only one rail.

== Reception ==
Ballance was met with positive reviews from critics upon release. An Adrenaline Vault review by Bob Mandel described the game's graphics as "heavenly", particularly admiring the "exquisite detail". Mandel thought the sounds were "absolutely outstanding", enjoyed the music and thought the gameplay was exciting and intense.

In the late 2010s, the game achieved renewed popularity among users of Bilibili. Concurrently, several studios in China published and marketed copies of the program under different names, including Ballance: The Return.

On January 5, 2024, the game was re-released on Steam and GOG, this time published by Ziggurat Interactive.

== See also ==
- Neverball
- Switchball
- Oxyd and Enigma
