= Spindizzy =

1986 video game

- Amstrad cover depicting the player controlled probe (GERALD) on an isometric grid.
- Developers: Electric Dreams, Loriciels (Thomson)
- Publishers: Electric Dreams, Activision
- Designer: Paul Shirley
- Platforms: Amstrad CPC, Apple II, Atari 8-bit, Commodore 64, Enterprise 128, Thomson, ZX Spectrum
- Release: 1986
- Genre: Puzzle
- Mode: Single-player

Spindizzy is a 1986 isometric video game published by Electric Dreams Software, who released it on several 8-bit home computer systems. Combining action and puzzle elements, the game features a series of landscapes consisting of ramps and corridors suspended in a three-dimensional space. The player must navigate a transforming probe through the landscapes within a time limit.

Development was headed by Paul Shirley, who drew inspiration from Ultimate Play the Game games that feature an isometric projection. He approached the design as a mixture of an adventure game and a puzzle game, feeling that the ball rolling mechanic allowed for creative puzzles. Electric Dreams partnered with Activision to publish Spindizzy in the United States. However, Shirley eventually severed the contract due to late royalty payments and disagreements over Activision's business practices.

The game was successful in the United Kingdom and was well received by contemporary video game press. Reviewers praised its visuals and design but criticised its audio. Similarities were drawn to Marble Madness, which was released in arcades two years earlier and on home platforms in 1986. Years after Spindizzy's release, publications continued to praise it in respective reviews. The game was followed by a 1990 sequel: Spindizzy Worlds.

== Gameplay ==
The player controls a probe to explore an isometric stage. Game statistics (remaining time, collected jewels, and remaining stages) are tracked at the top. The ZX Spectrum version is pictured.

Spindizzy is an action and puzzle game played from an isometric perspective. The player can view the playing field from four angles and rotate between them. The screen displays a compass arrow to aid orientation. The game takes place in a fictional landscape of interconnected stages suspended in a dimensional space. The player controls a probe called a Gyroscopic Environmental Reconnaissance And Land-Mapping Device (GERALD) via keyboard commands or a joystick. The craft is able to transform between three configurations—a ball, an inverted square pyramid, and a gyroscope—that manoeuvre and respond to the terrain with subtle differences. In addition to moving in eight directions, the player can give the probe a burst of speed.

The player navigates the probe through hundreds of stages to explore the world within a time limit. The time limit can be extended by collecting power jewels scattered through the world whereas falling off a stage decreases the time. The player also incurs a time penalty if GERALD falls from a high elevation. Stages feature ramps, corridors, and other obstacles that hinder the craft from quickly travelling. Using the burst of speed while ascending a ramp can launch GERALD in order to access other areas of the stage. Some tiles have a symbol that when collected provide assistance. For example, the player can activate lifts that provide access to elevated regions. The game ends when time expires or the world is completely explored.

== Development ==
Spindizzy was developed by Paul Shirley for Electric Dreams Software, which Rod Cousens founded in 1985 as a British affiliate publisher of American video game company Activision. Shirley was primarily inspired by Ultimate Play the Game games that feature an isometric projection. While he has noted the similarities to the 1984 arcade game Marble Madness from Atari, Shirley has stated that he had Spindizzy's isometric engine operational before he had ever seen Atari's game; although he acknowledges others' scepticism. He derived the title from the Cities in Flight series of science fiction stories, which include antigravity devices called "spindizzies".

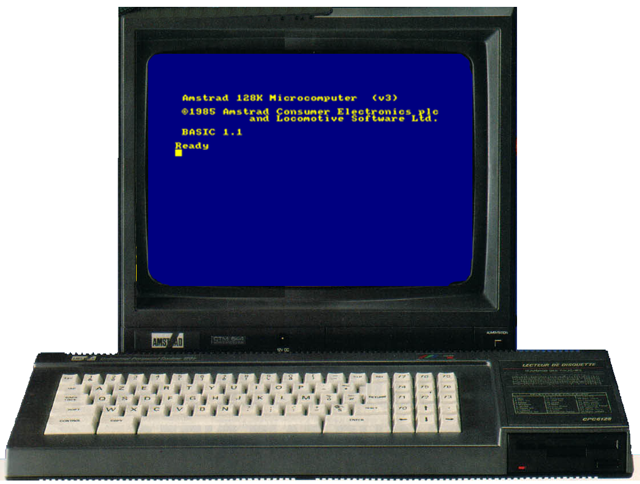
Paul Shirley developed Spindizzy on the Amstrad CPC microcomputer (pictured) and then ported the game to the Commodore 64.

Development lasted around eight months. Shirley programmed the game on an Amstrad CPC 6128 microcomputer. Rather than create an action game where the player rolls around a ball, Shirley approached the design as an "adventure/puzzle" game because he felt the "rollaround concept" affords a great deal of freedom when creating puzzles for the player. He developed an interpreted script to generate the game's levels. The script allowed him to design more than 380 stages using 11KB of storage, a feat he considered personally satisfying.

== Release ==
The game was originally released for the Amstrad CPC and ported to Apple II, Atari 8-bit computers, Commodore 64 and ZX Spectrum computers. Phil Churchyard assisted with the ZX Spectrum port. Copies of Spindizzy were promoted as contest prizes in Your Sinclair and Computer and Video Games magazines upon its release. Activision published the game in the United States as part of its "Electric Dreams" series.

The publisher's opaque business practices with Shirley left him excluded from activities and decisions related to Spindizzy; for example, he was unaware of the Apple port's existence until the mid-1990s. Activision sold Spindizzy's compilation rights not long after obtaining them, which reduced the amount of royalties to Shirley and Electric Dreams. Shirley eventually severed the contract with the company, citing late royalty payments among other actions he disagreed with.

Beau Jolly included the game in two compilations, Five Star Games and 10 Computer Hits 4, which it published during the 1986 and 1987 holiday seasons, respectively, for the ZX Spectrum, Commodore 64, and Amstrad CPC. A cassette tape packaged with the April 1991 issue of Your Sinclair also contains the game. In 2019, Retro Games released a modern replica of the Commodore 64, THEC64, which includes Spindizzy among other Commodore 64 games preinstalled.

== Reception ==
Reception

Review scores
Publication	Score
AllGame	4/5
Amstrad Action	96%
Crash	93%
Your Sinclair	9/10
Zzap!64	98%
INFO	4/5

Awards
Publication	Award
Crash	Crash Smash (June 1986)
Zzap!64	Gold Medal (June 1986)

Shirley described the game's marketing life as short and attributed that to Activision's business practices. James Hague of Dadgum Games commented that Spindizzy could have been an "all-time classic" had it received a proper marketing campaign. Despite this, the game sold well in the United Kingdom, reaching the number one position in the Amstrad charts in March 1986. The Commodore and Spectrum versions also appeared on their respective platforms' Top 10 charts on their release several weeks later, taking the game to the number 2 position in the all formats chart.

The game was well received by video game journalists upon its release. The Amstrad Action, Zzap!64, and Crash magazines awarded Spindizzy their respective top recommended distinctions: "Master Game", "Gold Medal", and "Crash Smash". Tony Hetherington of Computer Gamer listed it as one of the essential Spectrum titles of 1986. Reviewers drew comparisons to Marble Madness, which was ported to home platforms the same year. Writing for Computer Gamer, Mike Roberts called Spindizzy the "best 'marble' game yet", and Charles Ardai of Computer Gaming World called it "a thoroughly enjoyable game" superior to Marble Madness. Your Sinclair's Phil South described Spindizzy as the "closest thing yet to Marble Madness" on the ZX Spectrum, while Gary Liddon of Zzap!64 considered the similarities to Marble Madness coincidental. Many publications commented that the game was obviously inspired by Marble Madness.

Praise from reviewers focused on the game's visuals and design, while criticism focused on the audio. Amstrad Action's Bob Wade raved about the game's special features, such as the map and view switching, and the visuals, which he called "superb" and "stunning". Wade noted the only complaint was the limited sound effects, which he still considered functional. Three of Zzap!64's reviewers—Julian Rignall, Gary Liddon, and Gary Penn—called the graphics "amazing", well-executed, and "varied"; but they described the audio as sparse. Rignall and Penn complimented the challenging gameplay and commented that its addictiveness outweighed any frustration experienced while playing. The three summarised by urging readers to purchase the game. Roberts praised Spindizzy's gameplay but mentioned that the screen's orientation can require a period of adjustment, particularly when using a joystick. Crash's reviewer called Spindizzy "one of the most addictive" ZX Spectrum games, noting its innovative use of shape changing, multiple view angles, and speed control. The audio was seen as lacking compared to the rest of the game but was still described as good. South gave the game high marks for graphics, playability, value for money, and addictiveness. He praised the ability to change viewpoints and the realistic movements of the character sprite. He also lauded the speed and quality of the graphics. Info magazine's three reviewers—Benn Dunnington, Mark Brown, and Tom Malcolm—recommended the Commodore 64 version as "a hot little number with much of the appeal of Marble Madness" but better. Roy Wagner reviewed the game for Computer Gaming World, stating that Spindizzy "has a lot to offer and is an excellent value."

The title has received a positive retrospective reception years after its release as well. In 1993, Commodore Force ranked the game number ten on its list of the top 100 Commodore 64 games. More than a decade later, reviews still praised the game. Allgame editor Ryan Glover called Spindizzy an "innovative puzzler" that prompts players to fully explore it. Saying that the game successfully mixed infuriating moments with brilliant design, Darran Jones of Retro Gamer called Spindizzy a "timeless classic". The magazine rated Spindizzy the second best game with an isometric perspective, citing its presentation and stage designs. Over 25 years after its release, Retro Gamer staff called the game "intensely devious and addictive", adding that "Spindizzy's only enemy was yourself". Tony Mott included the game in the book 1001 Video Games You Must Play Before You Die. He praised the "witty scenario" and described Spindizzy as "more austere and cerebral than Marble Madness".

== Legacy ==
Other developers have referenced Spindizzy's isometric design when creating their games. Before developing Bactron, a 1986 isometric adventure game, Vincent Baillet researched popular isometric games at the time, including Spindizzy. Similarly, Spindizzy partially inspired Glenn Corpes during the development of the 1989 Amiga game Populous. Fascinated by the isometric graphics popular on 8-bit machines in the mid-1980s, Corpes considered Spindizzy his favorite game with this visual style. Drawing inspiration from the game's ramps and sloping hills that connected remote plains, he created an isometric level builder that he could manipulate.

Activision released a sequel titled Spindizzy Worlds for Amiga and Atari ST computers in 1990. The game features similar gameplay with improved graphics and larger playing fields. It was later ported to the Super Nintendo Entertainment System by ASCII, which Shirley disapproved of and considered a "disaster". He took legal action over the span of several years to obtain royalty information and payments.

== See also ==
- Gyroscope – 1985 video game with similar design and gameplay
- Bobby Bearing – 1986 video game with similar design and gameplay
