= Bo Jangeborg =

Swedish computer programmer

Bo Jangeborg is a Swedish computer programmer. He made several programs for the ZX Spectrum, the best known being the game Fairlight (1985), its sequel Fairlight II (1986), and the graphic tool The Artist. He also wrote Flash!, the art package provided with every SAM Coupé.

Today he runs the small software company Softwave.
