= Ostron =

1983 video game

- Original cover art
- Developer: Andrew Glaister
- Publisher: Softek
- Platform: ZX Spectrum
- Release: EU: 1983
- Genre: Platform

Ostron, originally released as Joust, is a ZX Spectrum video game developed and released by Softek in 1983. It is a clone of the 1982 arcade video game Joust.

== Reception ==
Crash deemed Ostron "a very enjoyable game, with good graphics and sound".

In-game screenshot
