= Fairlight (video game) =

1985 video game

- Developer: The Edge
- Publisher: The Edge
- Designer: Bo Jangeborg
- Programmers: Bo Jangeborg (Spectrum); Trevor Inns (C64, Amstrad)
- Artist: Jack Wilkes
- Composer: Mark Alexander
- Platforms: ZX Spectrum, Amstrad CPC, Amstrad PCW, Commodore 64
- Release: 20 August 1985: Spectrum; 1986: C64, Amstrad
- Genre: Arcade adventure
- Mode: Single player

Fairlight is an isometric projection arcade adventure video game developed by Bo Jangeborg and Jack Wilkes and released in 1985 on Softek's The Edge label. Developed in seven months, Jangeborg created the "Worldmaker" graphic development system to replicate the Filmation system used by Ultimate's Knight Lore. The game used code from a graphics utility he had developed in 1983, called Grax, which had also been the foundation of graphics package The Artist, published on Softek's SofTechnics label. Jack Wilkes contributed art assets towards the game, including enemy sprites and the title screen. A sequel, Fairlight II, was released in 1986.

== Gameplay ==
The player controls an adventurer named Isvar, on his quest to find the Book of Light to escape from Castle Avars which is displayed in an isometric view. Each object has its own physical properties and resultant characteristics in terms of how much else can be carried alongside it. Certain objects have special uses (e.g. keys open certain doors), and there is a puzzle element to the game to discover how some of these objects relate to the world in order to help the player solve the game.

In addition to carrying objects, they can be stacked on top of each other to enable Isvar to climb up to rooms above him or to reach objects otherwise out of reach. There are also a number of secret areas in the castle that are not visually obvious to the player and can only be discovered through exploration.

During Isvar's exploration of the castle he is accosted by its guards and monsters - trolls, monks, guards, tornadoes, man-eating plants, bubbles, etc. all of which drain Isvar's energy. The castle also contains food and magical potions which will restore his health. In addition, certain game objects can affect the enemies by either killing, distracting, or freezing them - depending on the object and the type of enemy they are used upon.

Once defeated, a guard disappears leaving only his helmet behind. Helmets can be picked up and carried by Isvar, and placed out of harm's way or into the path of a tornado, that destroys any object it touches. Should Isvar leave and re-enter the room, the guard will regenerate from the helmet.

== Reception ==
Reception

Awards
| Publication | Award |
|---|---|
| Crash | Crash Smash |
| Sinclair User | SU Classic |
| Your Sinclair | Megagame |

The game was well received critically and commercially, selling over 50,000 copies and reaching the number one position on the ZX Spectrum charts. Sinclair User gave the game a SU Classic award. The game won the 1985 awards for best arcade adventure, graphics, music and the "state of the art" award according to the readers of Crash magazine.

Jangeborg claimed Softek withheld royalty payments for Fairlight unless he signed up to produce further titles. Continuing legal disputes led to the sequel, Fairlight II, being released without Jangeborg's approval and in an unfinished state with a number of bugs, one of which meant the game could not be completed.

Inside Outing (also known as Raffles), released in 1988, also used Worldmaker as a game engine, but without Jangeborg's input.
