= Gyroscope (video game) =

1985 video game

- Electron cover art
- Developer: Catalyst Coders
- Publisher: Melbourne House
- Programmers: Acorn; John Nixon; David Wainwright; C64 "Dubree"; Spectrum; Steve Lamb; Tony Mack; Dave Dew
- Platforms: Acorn Electron, Amstrad CPC, BBC Micro, Commodore 64, ZX Spectrum
- Release: 1985
- Genre: Action
- Mode: Single-player

Gyroscope is an action video game published by Melbourne House in 1985 for the Acorn Electron, Amstrad CPC, BBC Micro, Commodore 64, and ZX Spectrum. It a clone of the Atari Games arcade video game Marble Madness with a gyroscope replacing the player-controlled marble. Melbourne House later published official ports of Marble Madness for the ZX Spectrum and Amstrad CPC which were not based on Gyroscope.

== Gameplay ==
The gameplay is very similar to Marble Madness except the player controls a spinning gyroscope rather than a marble. The game is presented in isometric 3D. The player must guide the gyroscope from the top of the course to the bottom within an allotted time limit. If the gyroscope topples off the edge, a life is lost. Hazards on the course include potholes, aliens and glass slopes which cause the gyroscope to spin in random directions. There are five courses consisting of four screens each. The gyroscope must land on a marked square to complete each level.

== Reception ==
Reception

Award
Publication	Award
Crash	Smash!

Your Sinclair gave the game 9/10, praising the 3D graphics. It was also placed at number 77 in the Your Sinclair top 100.

Electron User gave it a score of 6/10, again praising the graphics, but complaining about a number of bugs spoiling "what could be a very good game".
