= Fairlight II (video game) =

1986 video game

- Publisher: The Edge
- Designers: Bo Jangeborg; Niclas Osterlin
- Engine: Grax
- Platforms: Amstrad CPC, Amstrad PCW, ZX Spectrum
- Release: 1986
- Genre: Action-adventure
- Mode: Single-player

Fairlight II: A Trail of Darkness is an isometric 3D action-adventure game released by The Edge in 1986 for the ZX Spectrum. It is the sequel to Fairlight.

== Plot ==
ZX Spectrum title screen

Isvar successfully retrieved the Book of Light in Fairlight, but was then tricked into delivering it to the Dark Lord, who is now using it to further torment the land of Fairlight. Isvar must penetrate the Dark Tower and recover the book so that it may be taken to its rightful owner.

== Gameplay ==
The game is very similar to its predecessor, though it is larger with more locations to explore.

== Reception ==
Sinclair User: "The Edge means business. Fairlight 2 is not for weekend adventurers. You're going to have to be up all night... Criticisms? Very few."
