= Marble Madness =

1984 video game

- North American flyer advertising the System I hardware and arcade cabinet
- Developer: Atari Games Inc.
- Publishers: Atari Games Inc.: Mobile; THQ Wireless; Electronic Arts
- Designer: Mark Cerny
- Programmer: Bob Flanagan
- Artists: Mark Cerny; Sam Comstock
- Composers: Brad Fuller; Hal Canon
- Platform: Arcade: Amiga, Commodore 64, Atari ST, Apple II, IBM PC, Amstrad CPC, ZX Spectrum, Apple IIGS, NES, Game Boy, Genesis/Mega Drive, FM Towns, PC-98, X68000, Master System, Game Gear, Game Boy Color, mobile phone, Game Boy Advance
- Release: December 1984: Arcade; NA: December 1984 Amiga; July 1986 C64; September 1986 Apple II; February 1987 IBM PC; June 1987 NES; NA: March 1989 Game Boy; NA: May 1991 Genesis/Mega Drive; NA: 1991; EU: March 1992; JP: August 13, 1993 Master System; EU: August 1992 Game Gear; NA/EU: September 1992 Game Boy Color; NA: December 1999 Game Boy Advance; NA: August 22, 2005
- Genres: Platform, racing
- Modes: Single-player, multiplayer
- Arcade system: Atari System 1

Marble Madness is a 1984 platform game designed by Mark Cerny and published by Atari Games Inc. for arcades. Set in an isometric perspective, the game tasks the player with guiding a marble through six courses, populated with obstacles and enemies, within a time limit. The player controls the marble by using a trackball. Marble Madness is known for using innovative game technologies: it was Atari's first to use the Atari System 1 hardware, the first to be programmed in the C programming language, and one of the first to use true stereo sound (previous games used either monaural sound or simulated stereo).

In designing the game, Cerny drew inspiration from miniature golf, racing games, and the art of M. C. Escher. He aimed to create a game that offered a distinct experience with a unique control system. Cerny applied a minimalist approach in designing the appearance of the game's courses and enemies. Throughout development, he was frequently impeded by limitations in technology and had to forgo several design ideas.

Upon its release in arcades, Marble Madness was commercially successful and profitable. Critics praised the game's difficulty, unique visual design, and stereo soundtrack. The game was ported to numerous platforms and inspired the development of several similar games. A sequel was developed and planned for release in 1991, but was canceled when location testing showed it could not succeed in competition with other titles.

== Gameplay ==
The blue, player-controlled marble (center left) traverses an isometric course. Scores and available time are tracked at the top of the screen.

Marble Madness is an isometric platform game in which the player manipulates an onscreen marble from a third-person perspective. In the arcade version, a player controls the marble's movements with a trackball; most home versions use game controllers with directional pads. The player's goal is to complete six maze-like isometric race courses before a set amount of time expires. With the exception of the first race, any time left on the clock at the end of a race is carried over to the next one, and the player is granted a set amount of additional time as well. The game allows two players to compete against each other, awarding bonus points and extra time to the winner of each race; both players have separate clocks.

Courses are populated with various objects and enemies, designed to obstruct the player, as well as track surfaces that make control of the marble more difficult. As the game progresses, the courses become increasingly difficult and introduce more enemies and obstacles. Each course has a distinct visual theme. For example, the first race (titled "Practice") is a simple course that is much shorter than the others, while the fifth race (named "Silly") features polka-dot patterns and is oriented in a direction opposite that of the other courses.

== Development ==
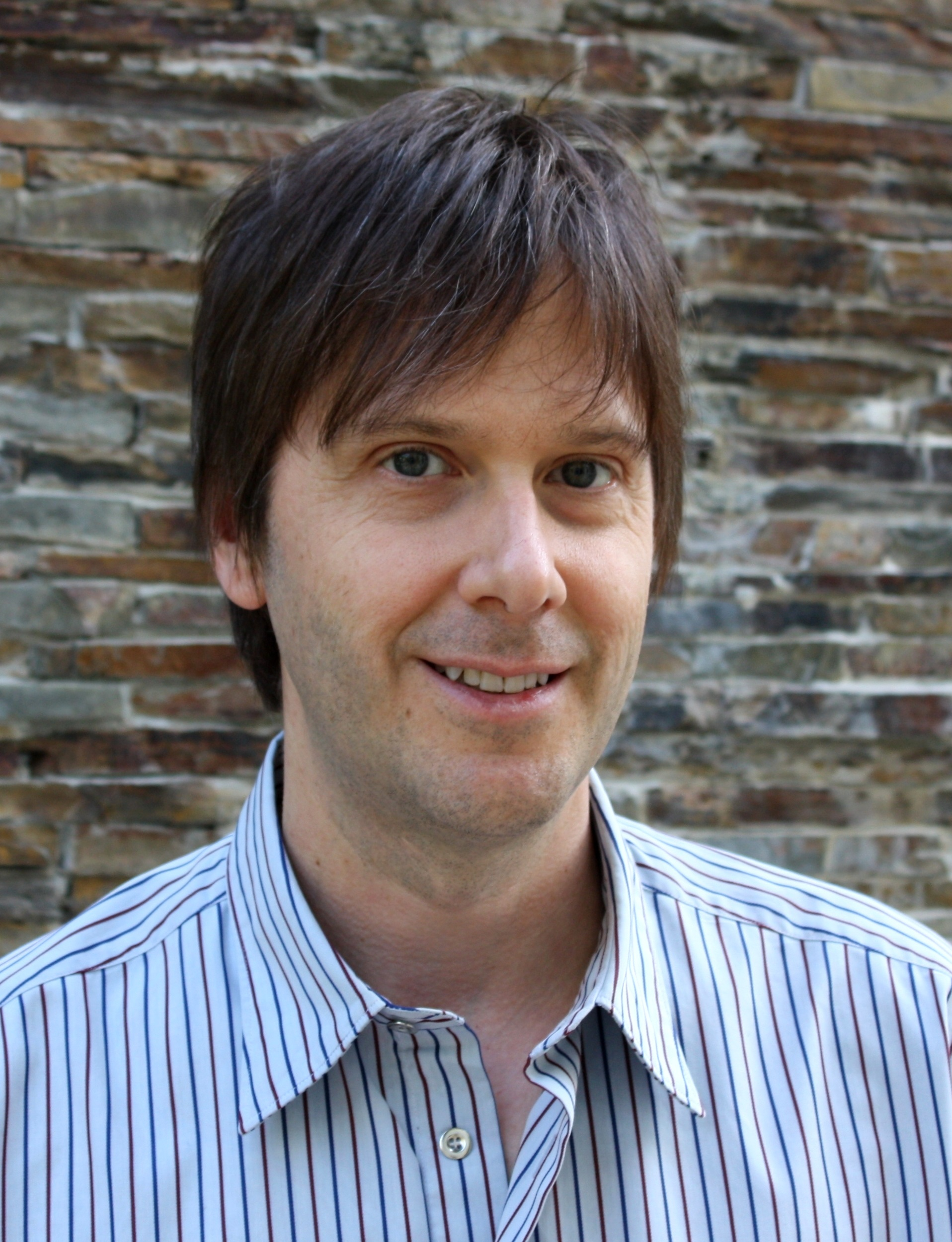
Mark Cerny (shown in 2010)

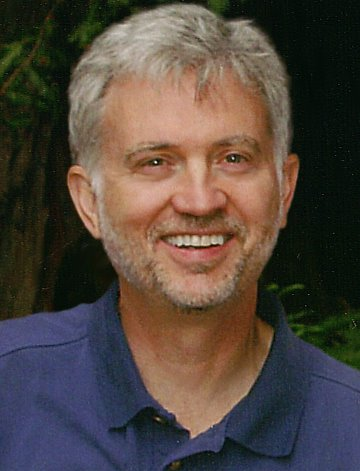
Brad Fuller (shown in 2005)

The Marble Madness development team included lead designer Mark Cerny and composer Brad Fuller.

Marble Madness was developed by the arcade division of Atari, Inc. with Mark Cerny as lead designer and Bob Flanagan as software engineer. Both Cerny and Flanagan programmed the game. It uses the Atari System 1 hardware, which was an interchangeable system of circuit boards, control panels, and artwork. The game displays pixel graphics on a 19-inch Electrohome G07 model CRT monitor and uses a Motorola 68010 central processing unit (CPU) with a MOS Technology 6502 subsystem to control the audio and coin operations. Marble Madness was the first arcade game to use an FM sound chip produced by Yamaha, similar to a Yamaha DX7 synthesizer, which created the music in real time so that it was synchronized with the game's on-screen action. The game's music was composed by Brad Fuller and Hal Canon; both spent a few months becoming familiar with the sound chip's capabilities.

Cerny and Flanagan first collaborated on a video game based on Michael Jackson's Thriller. The project was canceled, and the two began working on an idea of Cerny's that eventually became Marble Madness. Development lasted 10 months. Following the video game crash of 1983, game development within Atari focused on providing a distinctive experience through the use of a unique control system and by emphasizing a simultaneous two-player mode. Cerny designed Marble Madness in accordance with these company goals. He was first inspired by miniature golf and captivated by the idea that a playfield's contours influenced a ball's path. Cerny began testing various ideas using Atari's digital art system. After deciding to use an isometric grid, Cerny began developing the game's concept. His initial idea involved hitting a ball in a way similar to miniature golf, but Atari was unenthusiastic. Cerny next thought of racing games and planned for races on long tracks against an opponent. Technology limitations at the time were unable to handle the in-game physics necessary for the idea, and Cerny switched the game's objective to a race against time.

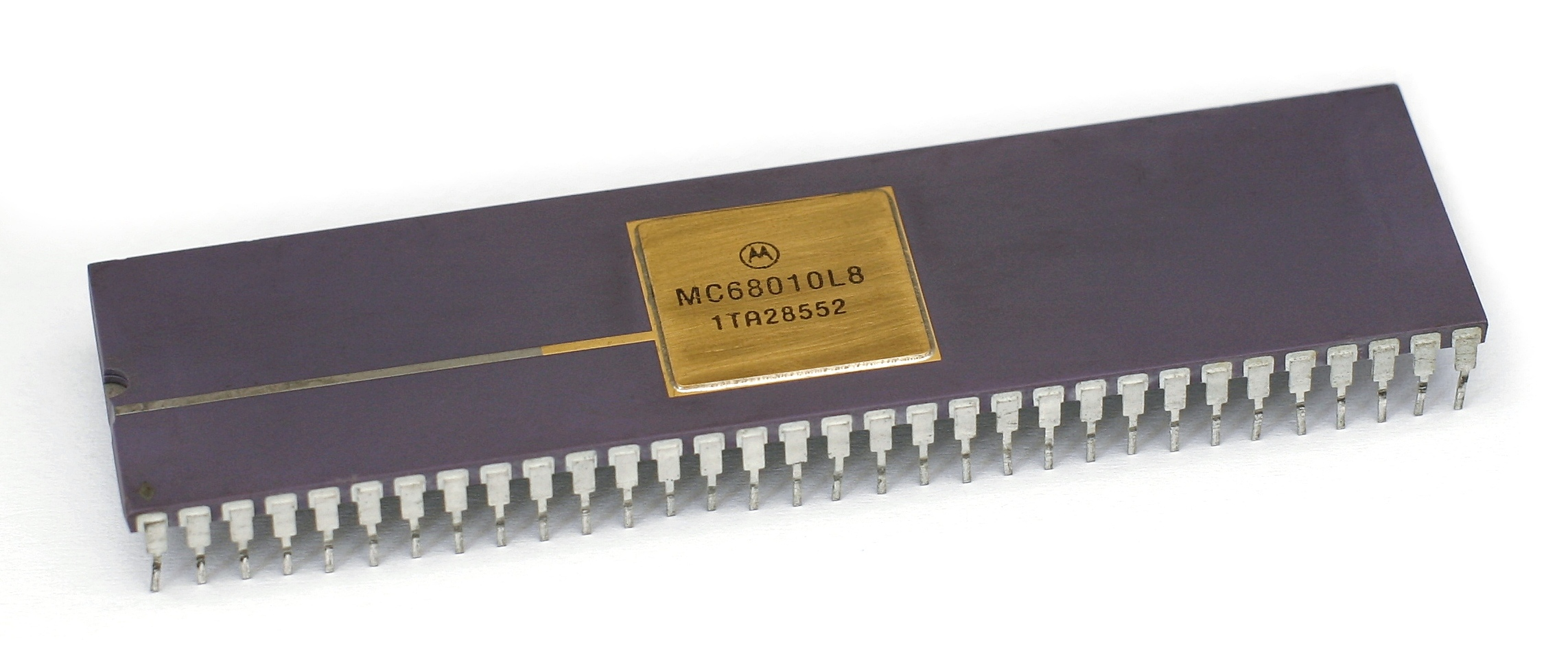
The Motorola 68010 (pictured) allowed the developers to program in the more user-friendly C programming language but at the expense of the game running at half the speed of other arcade games.

The development toolkit for the Motorola CPU included a compiler for the C programming language, which the two programmers were familiar with. After Atari had conducted performance evaluations, it approved usage of the language. Cerny and Flanagan's decision to program Marble Madness in the C language had positive and negative consequences. Atari games had previously been programmed in assembly language. The C language was easier to program but was less efficient, so the game operates at the slower speed of 30 Hz instead of the normal 60 Hz frequency of arcade games at the time. Cerny decided to use a trackball system (marketed by Atari as Trak-Ball) to give the game a unique control system, and he chose a motorized trackball for faster spinning and braking when the in-game ball traveled downhill and uphill, respectively. As it was building the prototypes, Atari's design department informed Cerny that the motorized trackball's design had an inherent flaw—one of the four supports had poor contact with the ball—and the use of a regular trackball was more feasible. Additionally, Cerny had anticipated the use of powerful custom chips that would allow RAM-based sprites to be animated by the CPU, but the available hardware was a less advanced system using ROM-based static sprites.

Concepts for Marble Madness were outlined in an extensive design document. The document contains a number of ideas, like the tilting ramp (top right) and see-saw scale (bottom right), that were not used in the final product.

These technical limitations forced Cerny to simplify the overall designs. Inspired by M. C. Escher, he designed abstract landscapes for the courses. In retrospect, Cerny partly attributed the designs to his limited artistic skills. He was a fan of the 3D graphics used in Battlezone and I, Robot, but Cerny felt the visuals lacked definition and wanted to create a game with "solid and clean" 3D graphics. Unlike most arcade games of the time, the course images were not drawn on the pixel level. Instead, Cerny defined the elevation of every point in the course and stored this information in a heightmap array. The course graphics were then created by a ray tracing program that traced the path of light rays, using the heightmap to determine the appearance of the course on screen. This format also allowed Cerny to create shadows and use spatial anti-aliasing, a technique that provided the graphics with a smoother appearance. Cerny's course generator allowed him more time to experiment with the level designs. When deciding what elements to include in a course, practicality was a big factor; elements that would not work or would not appear as intended were omitted, such as an elastic barricade or a teeter-totter scale. Other ideas dropped from the designs were breakable glass supports, black hole traps, and bumps and obstacles built into the course that chased the marble.

Cerny's personal interests changed throughout the project, leading to the inclusion of new ideas absent from the original design documents. The game's enemy characters were designed by Cerny and Sam Comstock, who also animated them. Enemies had to be small in size due to technical limitations. Cerny and Comstock purposely omitted faces to give them unique designs and create a minimalistic appearance similar to the courses. Atari's management, however, suggested that the marble should have a smiley face to create an identified character, similar to Pac-Man. As a compromise, the cabinet's artwork depicts traces of a smiley face on the marbles. Flanagan programmed a three-dimensional physics model to dictate the marble's motions and an interpreted script for enemy behavior. As Marble Madness neared completion, the feedback from Atari's in-house focus testing was positive. In retrospect, Cerny wished he had included more courses to give the game greater longevity, but extra courses would have required more time and increased hardware costs. Atari was experiencing severe financial troubles at the time and could not extend the game's development period as it would have left their production factory idle.

== Release ==
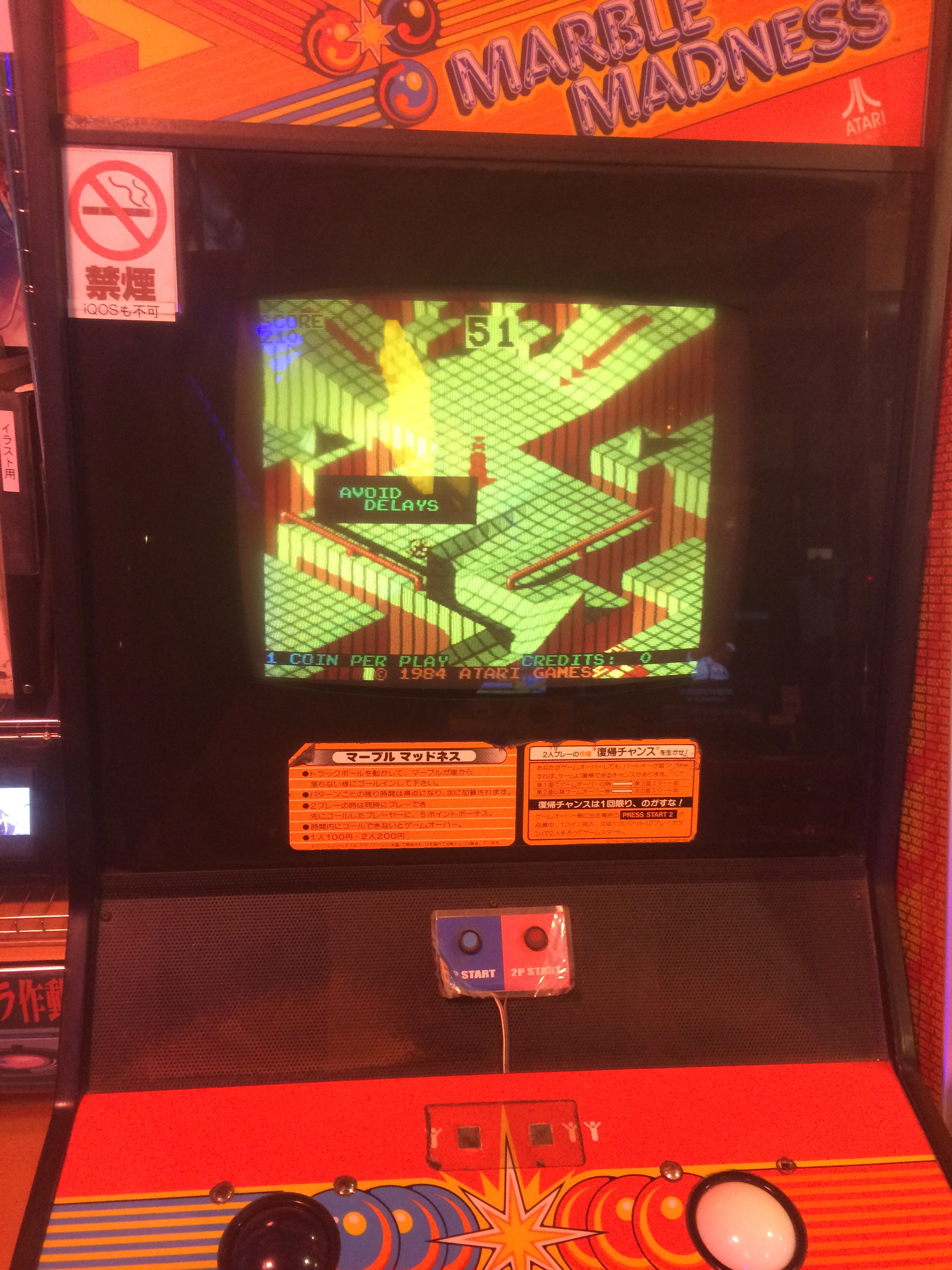
A Marble Madness arcade cabinet in Shinjuku, Japan

The game was originally released in arcades in December 1984. Beginning in 1986, Marble Madness was released for multiple platforms with different companies handling the conversions; several home versions were published by Electronic Arts, Tiger Electronics released handheld and tabletop LCD versions of the game, and was ported to the Nintendo Entertainment System by Rare, to the Sega Mega Drive in Japan by Tengen, and to the Sega Genesis by Electronic Arts. The Commodore 64 and Apple IIe versions have a secret level not present in other versions. An iOS port was in development by Handheld Games, but was never released.

Beginning with the 1998 title Arcade's Greatest Hits: The Atari Collection 2, Marble Madness has been included in several arcade game compilations. In 2003, it was included in the multi-platform Midway Arcade Treasures, a compilation of games developed by Williams Electronics, Midway Games and Atari. Marble Madness was also included in the 2012 Midway Arcade Origins collections. THQ Wireless released a mobile phone port on the Java ME platform in 2004. Electronic Arts released a mobile phone port in 2010 that includes additional levels with different themes and new items that augment the gameplay. Marble Madness, along with many other Midway arcade games, appear in the 2016 Midway Arcade Level Pack expansion of Lego Dimensions. The developer, Traveller's Tales, considered recreating them in Lego form but decided to present them in their original forms to maintain what they felt made the games good. In 2021, the game joined other classic arcade games on the Antstream Arcade gaming platform. It left the service in 2023 after the licensing agreement expired.

== Reception ==
Marble Madness was commercially successful following its release in December 1984, and was positively received by critics. Around 4,000 cabinets were sold, and it soon became the highest-earning game in arcades. However, the game consistently fell from this ranking during its seventh week in arcades where Atari tracked the game's success. Cerny attributed the six-week arcade life to Marble Madness's short gameplay length; he believed that players lost interest after mastering it and moved on to other games. In Japan, Game Machine listed the game as the second most successful upright/cockpit arcade unit of April 1985.

Many reviewers felt that the high level of skill required to play the game was part of its appeal. In 2008, Levi Buchanan of IGN listed Marble Madness as one of several titles in his "dream arcade", citing the game's difficulty and the fond memories he had playing it. Author John Sellers wrote that difficulty was a major reason that players were attracted. Other engaging factors included the graphics, visual design and the soundtrack. Retro Gamer's Craig Grannell, in referring to the game as one of the most distinctive arcade games ever made, praised its visuals as "pure and timeless". In 1995, Flux rated the game ninety-ninth on its "Top 100 Video Games". In 1996, Next Generation ranked the arcade version of Marble Madness as 15 on their "Top 100 Games of All Time". In 1997, Electronic Gaming Monthly listed it as the tenth-best arcade game of all time. In 2003, Marble Madness was inducted into GameSpot's list of the greatest games of all time. In 2008, Guinness World Records listed it as the number seventy-nine arcade game in technical, creative and cultural impact. Marble Madness was one of the first games to use true stereo sound and have a recognizable musical score. British composer Paul Weir commented that the music had character and helped give the game a unique identity. A common complaint about the arcade cabinet was that the track ball controls frequently broke from repeated use.

=== Home versions ===
The different ports were met with mixed reception. John Harris of Gamasutra thought the arcade's popularity fueled the sales of the home versions, while Thomas Hanley of ScrewAttack commented that most versions were not as enjoyable without a track ball. Grannell echoed similar statements about the controls and added that many had poor visuals and collision detection. He listed the Amiga, Game Boy and Sega Genesis ports as the better conversions, and the ZX Spectrum, IBM PC compatibles and Game Boy Advance versions among the worst. MegaTech reviewers rated the Sega Genesis release favorably. Next Generation staff also liked the Sega Genesis version, but noted that the experience is better when playing with the original trackball controls.

Compute! writers called the Amiga version's graphics and gameplay "arcade-quality". Reviewing for Computer Gaming World, Roy Wagner stated that the Amiga version was superior to the arcade original. Bruce Webster of Byte wrote that the graphics of the Amiga version of Marble Madness in December 1986 "are really amazing". While criticizing the lack of a pause function or a top scores list, he said that it "is definitely worth having if you own an Amiga". Bil Herd recalled that the Amiga version was so popular at Commodore International that employees stole the required memory expansion from colleagues' computers to run the game. Benn Dunnington of Info gave the Amiga version four-plus stars out of five, describing it as "a totally faithful adaptation", and hoped that a sequel was in development. The magazine staff rated the Commodore 64 version a three-plus stars out of five, describing it as "just a shadow of the arcade original and the excellent Amiga version" and inferior to Spindizzy. The magazine liked the graphics, but criticized "marbles that handle like intoxicated turtles". Dragon's three reviewers—Hartley, Patricia and Kirk Lesser—praised the Apple IIGS port, calling it a "must have" title for arcade fans. It received a Your Sinclair Megagame award.

== Legacy ==
Marble Madness inspired other games that involve navigating a ball through progressively more difficult courses. Melbourne House's Gyroscope and Electric Dreams Software's Spindizzy were the first such games; both met with a good reception. In 1990, Rare released Snake Rattle 'n' Roll, which incorporated elements similar to Marble Madness. The Super Monkey Ball series uses similar gameplay based on rolling a ball, but adds other features such as minigames and monkey characters.

=== Unreleased sequel ===
An arcade sequel titled Marble Man: Marble Madness II was planned for release in 1991, though Cerny was not involved in its development. Development was led by Bob Flanagan who designed the game based on what he felt made Marble Madness a success in the home console market. Because the market's demographic was a younger audience, Flanagan wanted to make the sequel more accessible and introduced a superhero-type main character. Marble Man expanded on the gameplay of the original game with new abilities for the marble such as invisibility and flight, added pinball minigames between sets of levels, and allowed up to three players to traverse isometric courses. Flanagan intended to address the short length of the first game and, with the help of Mike Hally, developed seventeen courses.

Atari created prototypes for location testing, but the game did not fare well against more popular titles at the time such as Street Fighter II. Atari assumed the trackballs accounted for the poor reception and commissioned a second model with joystick controls. Because the new models were met with the same poor reception, production was halted and the focus shifted to Guardians of the 'Hood, a beat 'em up game. Arcade system boards for the sequel were rumored to have been destroyed to clear inventory for tax purposes in 1996, but Cerny has called the destruction an urban legend, indicating that at most 12 prototypes' boards were produced. These prototypes have since become collector items. In 2022, a prototype of the joystick-controlled version of Marble Madness II was leaked online.

== See also ==
- Ballance – 2004 puzzle game with a marble
- Hamsterball – 2004 video game with similar gameplay
- Kororinpa – 2006 puzzle game with a marble
- Marble Blast Gold – 2003 platform game with a marble
- Marble It Up! – 2023 platform game with a marble
- Mercury Meltdown – 2006 video game with similar gameplay
- Switchball – 2007 puzzle game with a marble
