= Benny Hill's Madcap Chase =

1986 video game

- Developer: Don Priestley
- Publisher: DK'Tronics
- Platform: ZX Spectrum
- Release: UK: 1986
- Genre: Action
- Mode: Single-player

Benny Hill's Madcap Chase is a 1986 ZX Spectrum videogame featuring Benny Hill and loosely based on his Thames TV show. The plot involves Benny deciding to help his neighbours by completing a number of tasks for them. It was Don Priestley's final game for DK'Tronics and the second to feature the extra large sprites that would become his trademark.

== Reception ==
Crash gave Benny Hill's Madcap Chase a positive review and awarded it 78%. Amongst the features the reviewers liked were the large graphics which avoided attribute clash, and the sense of humour with one reviewer stating that they "[loved] it when Benny hit something or the lady chasing him had a fit". The game was described as "playable" and "addictive" although there were concerns about its long-term appeal.

Your Sinclair magazine was less positive, awarding it a score of 6/10, stating that "True Hill fans will lament the absence of Hills Angels and the risky jokes but if you prefer being chased to chaste, this is the one for you, poor soul".

== Legacy ==
By the time Benny Hill's Madcap Chase was released, Priestley had left DK'Tronics, having been a director of the company since March 1983.. His earlier game for DK'Tronics, Popeye, was subsequently re-released by Macmillan Publishers who approached Priestley to use the same large graphics on a launch title for Piranha Software. Based on the animated series of the same name, The Trap Door, won multiple awards from the press and has been described as one of the best games ever released for the ZX Spectrum.
