= Attribute clash =

Display artifact caused by 8-bit colour on older computers

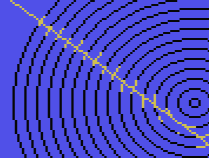
The effect of attribute clash on MSX 1 systems when using the 256×192 Highres mode of MSX 1 (in this example blocks of 8×1 pixels share the same foreground colour, so the effect is similar to a ZX Spectrum)

Attribute clash (also known as colour clash or bleeding) is a display artifact caused by limits in the graphics circuitry of some colour 8-bit home computers, most notably the ZX Spectrum, where it meant that only two colours could be used in any 8×8 tile of pixels. The effect was also noticeable on MSX software and in some Commodore 64 titles. There are workarounds to prevent this limit from becoming apparent.

== Causes ==
Attribute clash on the ZX Spectrum was caused by its idiosyncratic display memory layout, designed in such a way as to minimise memory use of the frame buffer, and optimise for text display instead of graphics. Rather than limit the colour palette to conserve memory, Sinclair's design stored pixel bitmap and colour information in separate areas of memory. While the bitmap specified the state of individual pixels (either on or off), the colour information (or "attributes") corresponded to the text character matrix—24 rows of 32 columns—with one byte per 8×8 pixel character cell. This byte encoded two 3-bit values, known as INK (foreground colour) and PAPER (background colour) after the BASIC instructions used to define the colour values. Two other binary values were included in an attribute; a BRIGHT bit indicating one of two brightness levels for the two colours, and a FLASH bit, which, when set, caused the two colours to be swapped at regular intervals. This scheme provided 15 different colours: the eight combinations of red, green and blue at two brightness levels (except for black, which appeared the same at both brightness). Thus, each 8×8 pixel block could only contain 2 colours from the 15 available, which must both be from either the BRIGHT or non-BRIGHT halves of the palette. Trying to add a third colour in an 8×8 pixel area would overwrite one of the previous colours.

The ZX Spectrum used 6144 bytes for the bitmap, with one byte representing eight pixels, and used 768 bytes for the colour attributes. This gives a total of 6912 bytes for the entire graphics display, a relatively small total for a computer of the Spectrum's era with "colour" capabilities. This graphics architecture was retained right through to Sinclair and Amstrad's later redesigns of the Spectrum, up until Amstrad's final model, the ZX Spectrum +3, despite subsequent models having contained 128 KiB of RAM, reducing the need to save memory in this manner. The architecture was retained to prevent loss of backward compatibility.

Attributes were used by a variety of other computers and consoles, including the Commodore 64, the MSX and NES, although the size of the attribute blocks and the number of colours per block varied. However, with the use of hardware sprites, attribute clash could be avoided.

The Thomson MO5 and TO7 microcomputers, the Oric 1, the MSX 1 architecture, and other systems based on the Texas Instruments TMS9918 video display controller display a very similar constraint: for each group of eight pixels horizontally, only two colours out of 16 are available, giving a similar but less severe effect than with the Spectrum. The MSX 1 did not have just one single colour attribute byte available for a whole 8×8 pixel area, as was the case with the Sinclair Spectrum, but eight, with one attribute byte for each 8×1 pixel group. Thus, while the Spectrum was limited to one colour pair for a square area of 8×8 pixels, the MSX 1 was only limited to one colour pair for a "line" of eight adjacent pixels. In addition MSX1 could use sprites which were not bound to any attribute clash problems (although MSX 1 sprites did have their own limitations, such as being monochrome).

== Effects ==
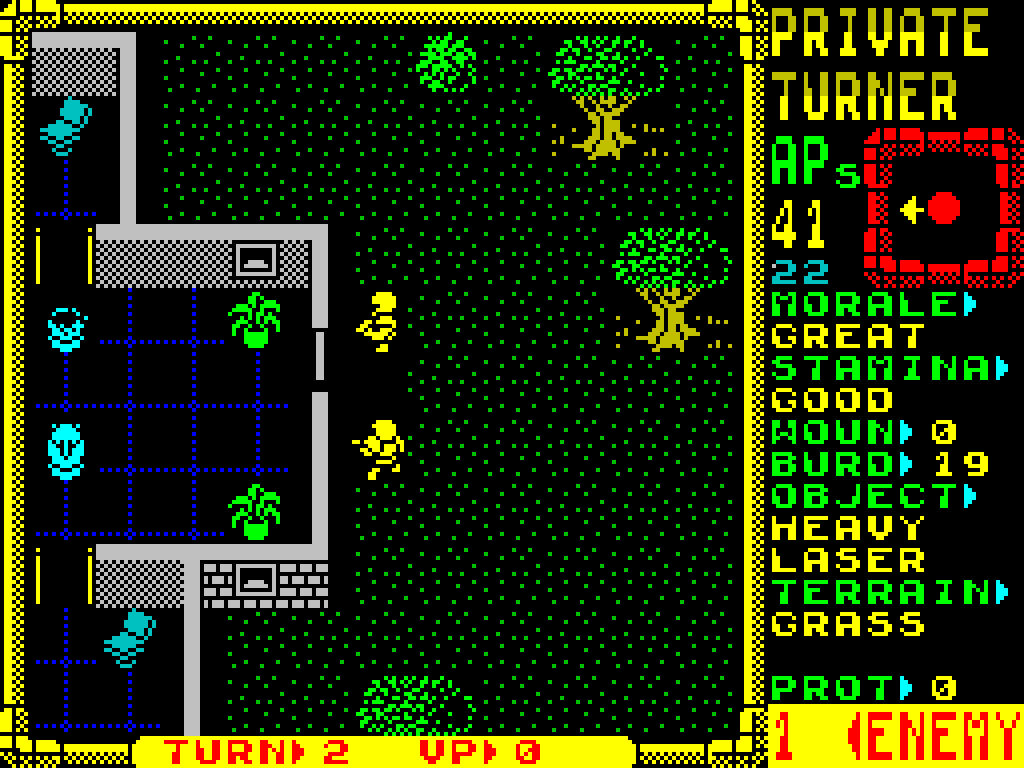
Laser Squad on the ZX Spectrum, dividing the game area into differently coloured blocks

To avoid attribute clash, static graphic displays had to be constructed with care. Finely detailed colour graphics were impossible, as colour could only be applied in 8×8 pixel blocks. Careful design could achieve impressive results, as could synchronising colour changes to the refresh rate of the display—usually a television set.

However, animated displays were more difficult—a distinct drawback in a machine whose primary use was playing video games. If just one pixel in an 8×8 block was recoloured because a moving part of the display touched it, the entire block would change colour. Thus detailed moving graphics caused large ugly fringes of rapidly changing colours to follow them around.

== Workarounds ==
Early software simply ignored the problem. Later, the standard workaround was to use colour for static display elements—such as a decorative border around the edges of the screen, which might include score displays and so on, or some form of instrumentation—with a smaller central monochrome area containing all the animated graphics. This also made graphics faster, as less of the screen had to be updated—both a smaller region, plus only changing pixel information and leaving the colour area untouched.

Some Spectrum software, such as FTL's Light Force, used extremely careful graphics design to achieve full-colour moving graphics, essentially by limiting both the design of the onscreen elements and their paths of motion to 8×8 colour resolution boundaries. The moving elements were thus relatively large and rather blocky or squarish, and their movement was constrained, but this was not visually obvious and the sight of moving full-colour graphics was hugely impressive to Spectrum owners.

No mainstream developers were able to find a suitable all-round fix for the attribute clash problem, instead preferring to use the monochrome graphics method when fast, clear graphics were needed, and full-colour graphics when the situation permitted.

It was possible by paying careful attention to timing to modify the attribute area of RAM at certain specific times as the display was drawn - let the display hardware draw one line of the display, then change the attribute RAM before the next line is drawn to give the effect of different attributes for each individual line. These changes had to be done in software and were time-consuming to program, meaning that this technique was usually limited to special effects. This technique was also very popular in the demoscene.

== The problem and solutions ==
Most games before 1987 ignored attribute clash. Some later games, such as Knight Tyme and Three Weeks in Paradise allowed players to select between two modes of attribute clash: one which ignored main character attributes, blending the character into the background and vice versa, prioritising the characters colour scheme over the background imagery.

Another workaround was to simply render the graphics in two colours, otherwise known as monochrome, as done with the Spectrum version of Knight Lore in 1984.

Many games used full-colour backgrounds and "character scrolling" (where the environment was scrolled eight pixels at a time), but monochrome sprites that were effectively transparent, as in Double Dragon, were drawn in such a way so they stand out, avoiding dependence on colour. Many games used this method with smooth pixel-by-pixel scrolling, but the attribute clash as elements of one character block were "passed" to the next were clearly visible.

A prominent (and less successful) example of the use of full-colour graphics was the Spectrum conversion of Altered Beast. The game suffers from considerable attribute clash.

Programmer Don Priestley developed a distinctive style for several of his games by using large, cartoon-like sprites which were carefully designed to span whole character blocks without appearing unduly square. A disadvantage of this technique was that the gameplay had to be designed around the graphics, and so it was not useful for ports from other platforms. Games that used this technique included Popeye, The Trap Door, Through the Trapdoor, and Flunky. Other developers who used a similar technique included Mike Singleton, with Dark Sceptre, and Gang of Five, with Dan Dare: Pilot of the Future.
