= Turmoil (1984 video game) =

- Developer: David Turner
- Publisher: Bug-Byte
- Platforms: ZX Spectrum, MSX
- Release: 1984
- Genre: Platform
- Mode: Single-player

Turmoil is a platform game released in 1984 for the ZX Spectrum, and in 1986 for the MSX by Bug-Byte. The player takes control of Mechanic Mick who has been employed by a rich Arabian Sheikh. The Sheikh has refused to pay Mick for work done, so Mick decides to steal his collection of expensive cars in lieu of payment. He must build the cars by collecting oil from a dripping oil tank. The oil can also be used as an offensive weapon against the pursuing Arabian guards.

== Gameplay ==
In-game animation taken from ZX Spectrum version

The playing area consists of a number of platforms, ladders, conveyor belts and swinging ropes which Mick must negotiate. First he must collect an oil can, which he must take to a tap which is dripping oil. The oil that has been collected must be taken to the garage. Once there Mick can empty his can, a drop at a time, to fill his car. The car is invisible initially, and is built up as each drop of oil is deposited. On the first level the car is a Mini, but as on subsequent levels the cars become more sleek and expensive.

Also present on each level are a number of enemies (resembling Arabs) who will attack Mick and cause him to lose a life. Unlike other platform games, the main character cannot jump by himself, but must fall onto one of the springs which are present on each level to bounce to a different platform. The Arabs will also make use of the ladders, ropes and springs.

== Reception ==
Reception

Award
Publication	Award
Crash	Smash!

Reviews were overwhelmingly positive. CRASH gave the game 90% (a "CRASH Smash"), calling it a "slick, well executed program", while Your Spectrum called it a "Hit" with 3.5/5. Dave Nicholls of Your Spectrum said that "the springs are a great idea",
