= Currah =

British computer peripheral manufacturer

Currah was a British computer peripheral manufacturer, famous mainly for the speech synthesis ROM cartridges it designed for the ZX Spectrum, Commodore 64, and other 8-bit home computers of the 1980s.

== Currah μSource for the ZX Spectrum ==
The Currah μSource, commonly referred to as the Microsource, from Quadhouse is a self-contained ROM cartridge with a full-function-two-pass macro assembler, Forth and a debugger, all of which can interact with BASIC. It is also compatible with Interface 1.

== Currah μSpeech for the ZX Spectrum ==
The Currah μSpeech, pronounced and frequently written MicroSpeech, plugged into the expansion port on the back of the ZX Spectrum. Additional leads were provided to feed the sound and UHF signal from the computer into the unit. The TV aerial lead plugged into the unit and speech sounds were added into the UHF signal generated by computer.

By default, the unit "spoke" every key-press the user made, even the direction keys which came out as "CURSOR". This could be controlled by a reserved variable keys. Typing

LET keys=0

would turn this feature off.

=== Programming speech ===
Specific words and phrases could be spoken by assigning a value to the reserved string variable S$. This was interpreted letter-by-letter unless brackets were used to denote other allophones. A simple example would be "(dth)is", (dth) representing the voiced dental fricative /ð/. Sixty-three allophones were provided. Rudimentary pitch modulation could be achieved by altering the case of the letters—upper case letters being pronounced at a slightly higher pitch.

A more complex example:

 5 REM OKAY WISEGUY THIS IS IT
10 LET a$=" (oo)K (AA)"
20 LET b$="w(ii)z (ggg) (ii),"
30 LET c$=" (dth)is iz it"
40 LET S$=a$+b$+c$

Currah Microspeech output
Audio recording of output from this program listing - 38 KB

=== Technical details ===
The unit contained a ULA which worked on a WRITE command from the microprocessor, a ROM containing the keyword speech patterns, and an SP0256-AL2 speech processor. It also contained a clock for clear speech and an audio modulator to transfer the sound to the TV lead. A small adjustment screw was provided, to allow fine tuning of the audio output.

The unit allocated itself the top 256 bytes of memory at switch-on and moved down the USR graphics and RAMTOP. This made it incompatible with some programs, particularly games, which use that space for machine code.

For cost reasons, the unit did not provide for daisy-chaining of further devices on the computer's expansion port. Many joystick interface manufacturers took the same approach, forcing many to choose between having a joystick or the MicroSpeech unit plugged in at any given time.

Booty (Firebird Software Ltd) detected the presence of a MicroSpeech unit and presented the user with a completely different game to that which would be played if the MicroSpeech unit was not present.

== History ==
Currah was acquired by DK'Tronics in 1985. DK'Tronics continued to manufacture the MicroSpeech unit, and many of their software titles (such as Maziacs and Zig Zag) supported it.
