= Idle animation =

Video game feature

A subtle idle animation of a character sprite, which can be seen to breathe and move its arms slightly

In video games, idle animations are character movements that occur when the player character is not performing any actions. They serve to give games personality, as an Easter Egg for the player, or for maintaining realism. Idle animations are also used as a return point for the completion of other animations, such as walking, firing a weapon, speaking, etc. Idle animations may either be handcrafted (created by a programmer/animator) or recorded by motion capture.

== History ==
One of the earliest games to feature an idle animation was Android Nim in 1978. The androids blink, look around, and seemingly talk to one another until the player gives an order. Another two early examples are Maziacs and The Pharaoh's Curse released in 1983. Idle animations grew in usage throughout the 16 bit era. Incorporating idle animations was done to give personality towards games and their characters as they are the only in-game actions aside from cutscenes where the characters are free to act independent of the player's input. The idle animation length and details can depend on interaction between the player and character, such as third person player idle animations being longer to avoid looking robotic on repeated viewing. In modern 3D games idle animation are done to give realism. For games targeting towards younger audiences the idle animations are more likely to be complex or humorous. In comparison, games targeted towards older audiences tend to include more basic idle animations.

== Examples ==
- Maziacs - The sprite character will tap his feet, blink, and sit down.
- Sonic the Hedgehog - Sonic will look at the camera and impatiently tap his foot when the player does not move.
- Donkey Kong Country 2: Diddy Kong's Quest - Diddy Kong juggles a few balls after a few seconds without input.
- Populous: The Beginning - Warrior and Firewarrior followers will do push-ups, followers will worship and bow to the shaman.
- Super Mario 64 - Mario looks around, and eventually falls asleep.
- Grand Theft Auto - The player character will light a cigarette.
- Grand Theft Auto: San Andreas - Carl "CJ" Johnson will sing songs including "Nuthin' but a 'G' Thang" and "My Lovin' (You're Never Gonna Get It)."
- BioShock Infinite - Booker DeWitt will interact with his Vigors depending on the one selected, e.g. Murder of Crows will cause his hands to grow long nails and feathers to erupt from his skin.
- State of Decay 2 - Survivors will stretch their bodies and remain vigilant.
- Red Dead Redemption 2 - When left on a horse for a while, Arthur Morgan/John Marston will pet the animal.
