= Splitting Images =

Splitting Images may refer to:

- A Danny Phantom Episode
- The 1980s video game
