= The Birds and the Bees II: Antics =

1983 video game

- Developers: Adrian Sherwin; Tim Lewis; Andrew Peckham
- Publisher: Bug-Byte
- Platforms: Commodore 64, ZX Spectrum
- Release: 1983
- Genres: Maze
- Mode: Single-player

The Birds and the Bees II: Antics is a video game released for the Commodore 64 and ZX Spectrum in 1983.

Boris the Bee has been kidnapped by a group of anti-social ants and his cousin Barnabee must rescue him. The player must travel through an underground ant complex, which has four different entrances into the above-ground world. Ants must be avoided; contact reduces the player's energy level. The game is over when energy reaches zero, but can be replenished by finding pollen from flowers present in the maze.

The general arrangement of the game is a maze; flowers will remove barriers elsewhere in the complex. The individual screens are also self-contained mazes. Each screen may have more than one exit.

== Reception ==
Reception

Award
Publication	Award
Crash	Smash!

Antics was placed at number 46 in the official top 100 list that was created by British gaming magazine Your Sinclair.
