= Savage Pond =

1983 video game

- Cover art of reissue
- Developers: Gwyll Jones; Peter Judd
- Publisher: Argus Press
- Platforms: Acorn Electron, Atari 8-bit, BBC Micro; Commodore 64
- Release: 1983
- Genre: Action
- Mode: Single-player

Savage Pond is an action pond simulation game which was written by Peter Judd for the Acorn Electron and BBC Micro, and by Gwyll Jones for the Atari 8-bit computers in 1983 and the Commodore 64 in 1984. It was originally released under the Starcade label and was reissued in 1985 when Argus acquired the Bug-Byte budget label.

== Overview ==
The game is set in a pond with the player taking the role of a tadpole. The aim of the game is to build up a colony of frogs while avoiding the many hazards. The setting and characters are all quite true to life which was quite unique at the time. Most contemporary arcade games, even if not set in space, such as Frogger (with frogs that cannot swim) and Centipede (which is basically a space shoot 'em up with characters that look like insects), were far from realistic. The instructions include descriptions of all the 'cast' including their Latin names and information not relevant to the game itself. Although it may appear to be an educational game it is actually a fast-paced arcade game.

== Gameplay ==
The game begins with Colony 1, which is a simple, peaceful pond. The tadpole character can swim around the pond eating amoeba. The only hazard in the pond are the hydra clinging to the bottom of the pond that will sting and kill the tadpole if they touch. There is also a dragonfly that occasionally flies over the pond and drops an egg. The egg can be eaten but if left to hatch, the larva will escape (but again can be eaten) and return as a nymph which will chase the tadpole until it catches and eats it or becomes exhausted and chrysalises to become another dragonfly. In order to build the frog colony, many 'evolutions' must take place, most of which increase the number of hazards. Blood worms regularly fall into the water and must be collected. After five worms are eaten, a beetle larva appears. If this is eaten quickly, the pond 'evolves'. In Colony 1 this means the introduction of jellyfish (similar to the hydra but stay at the top of the pond), the dumping of radioactive waste (which leaves the sides and bed of the pond deadly) and finally a move to Colony 2. This begins with the same hazards as Colony 1 but with a more complicated pond with an underwater cave area which makes swimming about more difficult. The pond continues to 'evolve', first with the appearance of the player's first frog. This sits on a log and can be used to eat the passing dragonflies. It also acts as an extra life as if all three tadpoles are lost, the frog will reproduce before leaving with its mate for a different colony. The player must create another frog before the pond can continue to 'evolve'. Further 'evolutions' include the water spider (which can trap the tadpole with its webs) and water fleas which can eat they player's frogspawn (spare lives). Colony 3 adds bumblebees which have apparently been affected by the radiation so attack the player's frog (in the only real exception to the true to life use of the rest of the creatures in the game). The player can now build up a colony of frogs.

== Screenshots ==
C64 - A quiet pond in Colony 1

Atari 16k - A slightly busier pond in Colony 1

Electron - A busy pond in Colony 2
