= Piranha Software =

Former UK video game label

Piranha
- Industry: Video games
- Founded: 1986 in London, United Kingdom
- Defunct: 1988; 38 years ago
- Fate: Closed by parent company
- Products: The Trap Door; The Colour of Magic
- Parent: Macmillan Publishers

Piranha Software was a short-lived video game publishing label created by Macmillan Publishers in 1986 and closed eighteen months later. In that time it gained a reputation for its unusual output from well known developers such as Don Priestley, Design Design and Delta 4. The majority of their games featured licensed properties including the first video game based on the Discworld novels and two games based on the animated television series The Trap Door.

== History ==
=== Education Software ===
Macmillan first entered the computer software market in 1983 when it jointly produced a range of educational software with Sinclair Research for use with the ZX Spectrum home computer. The venture was launched by Clive Sinclair and Harold Macmillan who proclaimed the software to be a "technological advance". The Learn To Read (based on Macmillan's Gay Way primary school reading scheme) and Science Horizons titles developed by Five Ways Software were followed in 1984 with four mathematics titles featuring Macmillan's own video game character, Macman.

In the latter half of 1985, the company released its first licensed products with two games tying in with the ITV children's series Orm and Cheep and moved away from educational software with a range of book and software packs including titles endorsed by Tottenham Hotspur goalkeeper Ray Clemence and The Magic Circle. In early 1986, the company completed its transition into the mainstream games market by re-releasing Don Priestley's Popeye, a ZX Spectrum game known for its large colourful sprites that had been released by dk'Tronics in 1985.

=== Launch ===
The Piranha Software label was announced as a "long term commitment to the game market" in July 1986 and its first five titles were officially launched at the Personal Computer World Show at Olympia London in September 1986.

Design Design were commissioned to produce a game featuring Rogue Trooper from the 2000 AD comic, and were tasked with adapting the 1979 horror film Nosferatu the Vampyre into the same isometric style as their previous game, N.E.X.O.R..

Fergus McNeill of Delta 4, who had recently had chart success with Bored of the Rings and The Boggit chose The Colour of Magic when he was offered the opportunity to translate a book into an adventure game.

Don Priestley was approached to bring the graphical techniques had used on Popeye to a game based on The Trap Door, a new ITV series due to start in October 1986. Five Ways Software converted the game to the Commodore 64 and Amstrad CPC computers and also developed Strike Force: Cobra, the only launch title not associated with a licence.

All of the launch titles were well received with The Trap Door winning multiple awards from the press and described as one of the best games ever released for the ZX Spectrum. The Trap Door and Strike Force: Cobra reached numbers 12 and 15 in the Gallup software charts.

=== Final Year and Closure ===
Piranha's titles of 1987 were less well received. The Gauntlet-style game, The Astonishing Adventures of Mr. Weems and the She Vampires, from The RamJam Corporation (who had previously developed the original Dandy conversions for Electric Dreams) was criticised for its unoriginality. The Commodore 64 version scored only 19% from Zzap64 with reviewer Julian Rignall judging the game as "simply appalling".

Don Priestley's next game, Flunky, was entertaining with its giant caricatures of the British royal family but lacked the gameplay of his earlier hit with illogical puzzles and frustrating controls. There was a much more positive reception for Through The Trapdoor, the sequel to The Trap Door, and The Big Sleaze, regarded as Delta 4's best adventure game.

Piranha announced a return to book, comic and cartoon tie-ins with a host of planned releases based on Fungus the Bogeyman, Roy of the Rovers, and 2000A.D.'s Halo Jones and Judge Death. However, only one more licensed game, Yogi Bear, was released before Piranha was abruptly closed after only eighteen months when Macmillan decided the label was no longer financially viable.

== Legacy ==
Alternative Software obtained the rights to Piranha's back catalogue and quickly re-released the games at £1.99. The Trap Door, Yogi Bear and Popeye all entered the top 10 budget games charts in 1988. Alternative Software went on to publish two sequels to Popeye. Popeye 2 (1991) and Popeye 3: Wrestle Crazy (1992) were produced by their in-house team, Bizarre Developments, rather than Don Priestley who had left the games industry after one last title featuring his large colourful graphics, Gregory Loses His Clock, released by Mastertronic and two further games for Alternative.

Nosferatu was one of Design Design's final games. The team renamed themselves Walking Circles and developed titles including The Living Daylights and Spitting Image for Domark. Mr Weems and the She Vampires and The Big Sleaze were also the last games by The RamJam Corporation and Delta 4. The RamJam Corporation had already collapsed by the time their game was published, and Fergus McNeill created Abstract Concepts, a new label with Activision to move in a more serious direction.

It was several years before Terry Pratchett allowed another conversion of one of his novels. In a 1993 interview about the upcoming Discworld, he described Piranha as having "the marketing skills of a wire coathanger".

== Games Published ==
1986

- The Trap Door (Don Priestley) (Note: Amstrad CPC and Commodore 64 ports by Five Ways Software.)
- Strike Force: Cobra (Five Ways Software)
- The Colour of Magic (Delta 4)
- Rogue Trooper (Design Design)
- Nosferatu The Vampire (Design Design)

1987

- The Astonishing Adventures of Mr. Weems and the She Vampires (The RamJam Corporation)
- The Big Sleaze (Delta 4)
- Flunky (Don Priestley)
- Through The Trap Door (Don Priestley)
- Yogi Bear (Dalali)
- Gunboat (Five Ways Software) (Note: Only the Commodore 64 version was released before the label was closed.)
