= Flyer Fox =

1984 video game

- Commodore 64 cover art
- Developer: Game Gems Inc.
- Publishers: TYMAC, Bug-Byte Software
- Platforms: Commodore 64, ZX Spectrum
- Release: 1984
- Genre: Shoot'em up

Flyer Fox is a shoot 'em up video game developed by Game Gems Inc. (C. Teufert & G. Carbonaro) and published by TYMAC for the Commodore 64 in 1984, with a ZX Spectrum version released by Bug-Byte Software in 1986.

== Gameplay ==
In Flyer Fox, the player controls a fighter jet escorting a jumbo jet through hostile airspace. The game is viewed from a first-person perspective through the cockpit of the player's aircraft. The primary objective is to defend the airliner from waves of enemy fighters while managing fuel and avoiding damage.

The player uses a joystick to control their aircraft, allowing for basic maneuvers such as banking left and right, climbing, and descending. The game does not feature complex flight simulation controls, focusing instead on combat. The player can fire heat-seeking missiles at enemy aircraft, with an automatic lock-on system assisting in targeting.

The player's primary objective is to defend the airliner from waves of enemy fighters. The game features a cockpit view with an instrument panel, including a radar to track nearby aircraft, a compass for navigation and locating the airliner, an artificial horizon for flight orientation, an altimeter, a fuel gauge, and damage status indicators for both the player's aircraft and the escorted airliner. A status line on the instrument panel provides scrolling messages about the current situation, including warnings of incoming attacks.

The game consists of multiple levels, each presenting increasingly difficult challenges. As the player progresses, enemy fighters become more numerous, faster, and more aggressive, with some able to return fire. The player's fuel is replenished at the start of each new level, but any damage sustained carries over. To complete a level, the player must destroy all enemy fighters while ensuring the airliner's safety. The game ends if the airliner is destroyed or the player's aircraft sustains critical damage.

== Graphics and sound ==
The game's visuals are relatively simple, with the sky, enemy aircraft, and the escorted airliner represented by basic shapes and silhouettes. The instrument panel occupies a significant portion of the screen.

Flyer Fox features limited sound effects, including missile lock-on tones and basic engine noises. The game also includes voice samples, such as warnings of incoming attacks. However, these audio messages can be difficult to discern due to the hardware limitations.

== Reception ==
Reception

Review scores
Publication	Score
Crash	63%
Computer and Video Games	27/40
Sinclair User	3/5
Zzap!64	70%
Computer Gamer	5/5 stars

Flyer Fox received mixed reviews. Opinions on the original Commodore 64 version were generally positive. Computer and Video Games described it as "a playable shoot-out style game with nice graphics", despite criticizing the sound quality. ZZap!64 praised the graphics and noted that the game would appeal more to arcade gamers than flight simulation enthusiasts. Computer Gamer was particularly enthusiastic, awarding the game a five-star rating and describing it as "very well presented and extremely addictive".

A 1986 budget release for the ZX Spectrum got more negative reviews. Reviewers from Crash magazine found the game's age evident in its lack of polish. The graphics were generally considered unremarkable, with one reviewer describing them as "run-of-the-mill, undetailed and shabby".

While some praised the game's speech synthesis as "quite realistic" and "fascinating", others found it irritating after prolonged exposure.

Gameplay received criticism for being repetitive and frustrating, with one Crash reviewer noting that "the lack of variety in play soon results in boredom setting in". The controls were described as "slow and unresponsive" by another reviewer.

Despite its flaws, some reviewers found value in the game's budget price point. As Crash concluded, "For the money, despite its easiness, it is good fun for a while".
