= The Astonishing Adventures of Mr. Weems and the She Vampires =

1987 video game

The Astonishing Adventures Of Mr Weems And The She Vampires
- Developer: RamJam Corporation
- Publisher: Piranha Software
- Platforms: Commodore 64, Amstrad CPC, ZX Spectrum
- Release: 1987
- Genre: Shoot 'em up
- Mode: Single-player

The Astonishing Adventures Of Mr Weems And The She Vampires is a video game developed by RamJam Corporation and published by Piranha Software in 1987 for the Commodore 64, Amstrad CPC, and ZX Spectrum. The game is loosely based upon the 1985 Atari Games arcade video game Gauntlet.

== Gameplay ==
The player controls the eponymous Mr. Weems, the bespectacled protagonist who must wander through the six level, vampire-infested maze. The player fights vampires using his garlic gun. There is also a garlic pill which makes Mr. Weems immune from attack for a while. He also has to collect keys to open locked doors which block access to higher levels. The objective of the game is to reach the lair of the Great She Vampire and defeat her using a stake, mallet, mega-garlic piece, mirror and crucifix.

== Reception ==
Mr. Weems and the She Vampires was published at a time when numerous Gauntlet clones were being released and received criticism for its unoriginality. The Commodore 64 version scored only 19% from Zzap!64 with reviewer Julian Rignall judging the game as "simply appalling".
