= Bug-Byte =

Video game company active from 1980 to 1985

Bug-Byte Ltd
- Industry: Video games
- Founded: May 1980
- Defunct: June 1985
- Headquarters: Mulberry House, Canning Place Liverpool, England
- Key people: Tony Baden, Tony Milner
- Products: Mazogs, Manic Miner, Twin Kingdom Valley

Bug-Byte Ltd. was a video game company founded in 1980 in Liverpool, initially producing software for the Acorn Atom and ZX80. Bug-Byte's first hit was Don Priestley's Mazogs which was one of the most successful titles for the ZX81. In 1983, it published Manic Miner, considered to be one of the most influential platform games of all time. The company went into liquidation in 1985 but their name and logo were purchased by Argus Press PLC for use as a budget software label.

== Formation ==
Bug-Byte was founded by Tony Baden and Tony Milner, two Oxford chemistry graduates. In 1981 they paid £75 for The Damsel and the Beast for the ZX81, the first game produced by Don Priestley, a former teacher who had learned programming from a night school course. Priestley produced two further games considered to be classic ZX81 titles, Dictator and Mazogs, before becoming a director of rival publisher DK'Tronics.

== Early success ==
In 1982, Bug-Byte published the first commercially produced games for the BBC Micro and ZX Spectrum, Spacewarp and Spectral Invaders, both developed by David Lawson. Lawson used the profits from his next game, Spectres, to set up Imagine Software with Mark Butler, another Bug-Byte employee. Spectral Invaders was the number one game for the ZX Spectrum in the first UK video game charts published by Popular Computing Weekly in December 1982.

In 1983, Bug-Byte published Styx, the first game from a three-game contract with Matthew Smith. His second, Manic Miner, originated in a request from Bug-Byte's Despatch Manager Alan Maton for a Donkey Kong style-game. Manic Miner became the best selling video game in the country within weeks of its release, but a dispute over royalties led to Smith creating his own publishing company Software Projects, and taking Manic Miner, and Maton, with him.

The company had several lesser hits over the next year including The Birds and the Bees (written by Matthew Smith's school friend Adrian Sherwin), the sequel Antics and the text adventure Twin Kingdom Valley which reached number one in the BBC micro charts. In early 1985 it was being reported that the company was having cash flow problems which soon led to liquidation.

== Use as a budget label ==
Later in 1985 the rights to their name and logo were purchased by Argus Press PLC for use as a budget software label. Along with original releases, they re-issued titles from the Argus Press Software back-catalogue and games previously published by Quicksilva and Starcade, which it had also recently acquired. In 1986, Tennis topped the BBC charts and their re-releases of American Football and Alien both reached the all-formats top 10 budget chart.

In 1987, Argus Press Software was purchased by its managing director, Stephen Hall, renamed Grandslam Entertainment and the Bug-Byte range was given a rebranding. The rights to Domark's games were also obtained resulting in re-releases of games including A View to a Kill and Split Personalities. The final few games were published under the name "Bug-Byte Premier" at a slightly higher price.

== Software products ==
=== Published by Bug-Byte ===
- Backgammon (1981)
- Breakout (1981)
- Chess (1981)
- Invaders (1981)
- The Damsel and the Beast (1981)
- Asteroids (1982)
- Dictator (1982)
- Dragon Quest (1982)
- Mazogs (1982)
- Panic (1982)
- Space Pirates (1982)
- Spacewarp (1982)
- Spectral Invaders (1982)
- Spectres (1982)
- Another Vic in the Wall (1983)
- Aquarius (1983)
- Cavern Fighter (1983)
- City Defence (1983)
- Cosmiads (1983)
- Galaxy Wars (1983)
- Manic Miner (1983)
- Old Father Time
- Pool (1983)
- Scramble (1983)
- Sea Lord (1983)
- Space Invaders (1983)
- Styx (1983)
- The Birds and the Bees (1983)
- The Castle (1983)
- Twin Kingdom Valley (1983)
- Up up and away (1983)
- Vic Men (1983)
- Vic Panic (1983)
- Fridge Frenzy (1984)
- Kung-Fu (1984)
- Rapscallion (1984)
- Star Trader (1984)
- Turmoil (1984)
- Automan (1985)
- Stay Kool (1985)
- The Birds and the Bees II: Antics (1985)

=== Published by Argus Press ===
- Bomber Bob (1985)
- Cricket (1985)
- Diagon (1985)
- Ice Hockey (1985)
- Jack Attack (1985)
- Ludoids (1985)
- Savage Pond (1985)
- Star Force Seven (1985)
- Tennis (1985)
- Zoot (1985)
- Aardvark (1986)
- BOP! (1986)
- Flyer Fox (1986)
- Hoodoo Voodoo (1986)
- Hunkidory (1986)
- Jeep Command (1986)
- Leaper (1986)
- Miami Dice (1986)
- Plan B (1986)
- Roboto (1986)
- Sky Hawk (1986)
- Time Trax (1986)
- Uranians (1986)
- Dunjunz (1987)
- Head Start (1987)
- Megarok (1987)
- Nick Faldo Plays The Open (1987)
- Rubicon (1987)
- Plan B2 (1987)
- Spellseeker (1987)
- Squeakaliser (1987)
- Star Soldier (1987)
- Strangeloop (1987)
- Templeton (1987)
- The Pay-Off (1987)
- Piggy (1988)
- Droid Dreams (1988)
- STI (Search for Terrestrial Intelligence) (1988)
- Test Cricket (1988)

=== Published by Grandslam ===
- Elevator Action (1988)
- Galaga (1988)
- Gladiator (1988)
- Grange Hill (1988)
- International Cricket (1988)
- Kat Trap (1988)
- Little Green Man (1988)
- Monkey Nuts (1988)
- Orbix The Terrorball (1988)
- Pi-R Squared (1988)
- Split Personalities (1988)
- Yabba Dabba Doo! (1988)
- Codename Mat 2 (1989)

on the "Bug-Byte Premier" label:

- Terramex (1989)
- Chubby Gristle (1989)
- Power Pyramids (1989)
- Peter Beardsley's International Football (1989)
- The Flintstones (1989)
