= TX-1 =

1983 arcade game

- Arcade flyer
- Developer: Tatsumi
- Publishers: JP: Tatsumi; NA/EU: Atari, Inc.
- Platform: Arcade
- Release: JP: October 1983; NA: October 1983; EU: Early 1984
- Genre: Racing
- Modes: Single-player, multiplayer

TX-1 is a 1983 racing video game developed and published by Tatsumi for arcades. It was licensed to Namco, who in turn licensed it to Atari, Inc. for release in the United States.

TX-1 placed a greater emphasis on realistic simulation racing than previous games in the genre, with details such as forcing players to brake or downshift the gear during corners to avoid the risk of losing control, and let go of the accelerator when going into a skid in order to regain control of the steering. It was also the first car driving game to use force feedback technology, which caused the steering wheel to vibrate, and the game also featured a unique three-screen arcade display for a more three-dimensional perspective of the track. It also introduced nonlinear gameplay by allowing players to choose which path to drive through after each checkpoint, eventually leading to one of eight possible final destinations.

A sequel, TX-1 V8, was released in 1984. Both TX-1 and its sequel were highly successful in Japan, where they were the top-grossing upright/cockpit arcade cabinets for a combined sixteen months between 1983 and 1985. The sequel was not licensed by Atari for North American release.

== Gameplay ==
The player about to pass an opponent.

Gameplay is similar to Pole Position, in which the player, driving a Formula One race car, must reach a check point in a certain period of time in order to continue playing. While negotiating the course, the driver must exercise caution in the turns, as excessive speed will cause the car to skid; additionally, the driver must also pass slower cars carefully to avoid a fiery crash.

Unlike Pole Position, each stage ends at a branch point; depending on which way the driver turns, the course will be substantially different. The final two stages of this five-stage game were based upon famous Formula One races of the time and are identified by the name of the country; the path chosen during the previous three stages determines which "races" can be run in the final two stages. TX-1 was a pioneer in this style of play, which would be copied by myriad other games, especially Sega's successful Out Run series.

== Development ==
Though TX-1 uses raster graphics similar to Namco's 1982 game Pole Position, TX-1 uses a unique surround-style, sit-down three-screen display. In this design, the primary monitor is mounted directly in front of the steering wheel and secondary monitors, angled at thirty degrees, are mounted both to the left and the right of the primary monitor. At the top of the left monitor is a display of the score and the car's current position; at the top of the right monitor is a running total of cars passed during the race. A display of stage, speed, and time remaining is at the top of the primary screen. The immense size of the cabinet limited the number of arcades which could display this game.

== Reception ==
Game Machine listed TX-1 as Japan's top-grossing upright/cockpit arcade cabinet of December 1983. TX-1 continued to top the Japanese upright/cockpit arcade charts for six months into 1984, through January, February, March and April up until May. It was later Japan's tenth highest-grossing upright/cockpit arcade game during the latter half of 1986.

Upon release, Computer and Video Games magazine called it "possibly the most sophisticated racing simulation game on the market to date" and said it was "a thrilling game!"

== Legacy ==
A sequel, TX-1 V8, was released by Tatsumi in 1984 and was licensed to Namco. In Japan, it topped the Game Machine upright/cockpit arcade charts for about ten months, from September 1984, through October, November and December, up until July 1985. Both TX-1 games topped the Game Machine upright/cockpit charts for a combined sixteen months between December 1983 and July 1985.

It was later Japan's eighth highest-grossing upright/cockpit arcade game during the first half of 1986. This game was not licensed by Atari and was rare in North America.

Hamster Corporation released the game as part of their Arcade Archives series for the Nintendo Switch and PlayStation 4, as well as their Arcade Archives 2 series for the Nintendo Switch 2, PlayStation 5 and Xbox Series X/S in July 2026. This version allows for the replication of the original three-monitor setup using an HDMI splitter.

== See also ==
- F355 Challenge
