= Nosferatu the Vampyre (video game) =

1986 video game

- Developer: Design Design
- Publisher: Piranha Software
- Platforms: Amstrad CPC, Commodore 64, ZX Spectrum
- Release: 1986
- Genre: Action
- Mode: Single-player

Nosferatu the Vampyre is an action game based on the film of the same name and runs on the Amstrad CPC, Commodore 64 and ZX Spectrum computers. It was developed by Design Design and published by Piranha Software in 1986.

== Plot ==
An estate agent named Jonathan Harker explores a castle to find some important papers, while his wife Lucy pursues the vampire that dwells in the castle.

== Gameplay ==
The game consists of three different stages. In each stage the player takes the role of a different character; Jonathan in the first stage, Van Helsing (along with Jonathan and Lucy) in the second stage and Lucy in the third stage. The castle rooms are displayed in an isometric view. The player can pick up four different items including one weapon (such as a gun), one tool (for example a lamp) and a healing item (like food).

== Reception ==
Reception

Review scores
Publication	Score
Crash	91% (ZX)
Sinclair User	5/5 (ZX)
TILT!	B (C64)
Computer Gamer	60% (ZX)
Aktueller Software Markt	6.4/12 (C64)

Award
Publication	Award
Crash	Smash

The game was praised for its excellent detailed graphics and animation while being comparable to The Great Escape. It received a Your Sinclair Megagame award.
