= Zig Zag (1984 video game) =

- Developer: DK'Tronics
- Publisher: DK'Tronics
- Programmer: Ed Hickman
- Platform: ZX Spectrum
- Release: 1984
- Genre: Maze
- Mode: Single-player

Zig Zag is a first-person maze video game written by Ed Hickman and published by DK'Tronics in 1984 for the ZX Spectrum.

== Gameplay ==
In Zig Zag, the player must explore a maze from first-person perspective searching for Scarabaqs, the creatures that hold sector entry data that the player needs to continue to the next level. Scarabaqs flee from the player, who must exploit their behaviour to chase them into dead ends.

Adversity comes in the form of Hoverbots, whose attacks drain the player's energy.

Zig Zag also supports the Currah MicroSpeech peripheral.

== Development ==
Chasing a Scarabaq in sector 2

The first-person 3D effect was achieved by using a series of vertical black lines to form the perspective of the walls, and to give the impression of the ceiling and floor. This also allowed relatively smooth movement animation, particularly when the player rotates left or right, but some reviewers found the stripes to be an eye-strain.

== Reception ==
Reviewers were impressed with the 3D graphics and endearing nature of the Scarabaqs sprites and behaviour. The drawn-out chases were described as tiring, but addictive. CRASH magazine awarded 85% in issue 5. In the CRASH issue 15 retrospective, Zig Zag was still appreciated as a good game although several reviews felt the gameplay became boring after a while. Your Spectrum awarded an average of 5 out of 10 in issue 5, also highlighting the fast and colourful 3D effect but viewed it as a "common-or-garden maze game".
