= Strike Force: Cobra =

1986 video game

- Developer: Five Ways Software Ltd
- Publishers: Piranha Software, Spinnaker Software
- Platforms: Commodore 64, Amstrad CPC, ZX Spectrum
- Release: 1986
- Genres: Action, Strategy/Tactics

Strike Force: Cobra is a video game published in the United Kingdom by Piranha Software for the Commodore 64, Amstrad CPC and ZX Spectrum home computers. It was subsequently released in the United States by Spinnaker Software.

== Plot ==
The world's top computer scientists have been kidnapped and forced to work for The Enemy. They have developed a system that will let The Enemy control the worlds nuclear weapons. Strike force must infiltrate his hideout, crack the computer codes, and rescue the scientists. The scientists will give a number when rescued that will help break the code using the DBL (Digital Lock Breaker).

Reception

Award
Publication	Award
Your Sinclair	YS Megagame
