= 1984 in video games =

1984 saw many sequels and prequels along with new titles such as 1942, Boulder Dash, Cobra Command, Jet Set Willy, Karate Champ, Kung-Fu Master, Yie Ar Kung-Fu and Punch-Out!! The year's highest-grossing arcade video games were Pole Position in the United States, for the second year in a row, and Track & Field in the United Kingdom. The year's best-selling home system was Nintendo's Family Computer (Famicom), which was only sold in Japan at the time.

== Financial performance ==
In the United States, home video game sales fall to $800 million ($2.5 billion adjusted for inflation).

=== Highest-grossing arcade games ===
==== Japan ====
In Japan, the following titles were the top-grossing arcade video games of each month on the Game Machine charts in 1984.

| Month | Table arcade cabinet | | Upright/cockpit cabinet | | Ref |
| Month | Title | Points | Title | Points | Ref |
|---|---|---|---|---|---|
| January | Hyper Olympic (Track & Field) | 14.54 | TX-1 | 18.19 | |
| February | 10-Yard Fight | 15.64 | TX-1 | 16.95 | |
| March | Vs. Tennis | 14 | TX-1 | 16.25 | |
| April | Vs. Tennis | 13.23 | TX-1 | 15.56 | |
| May | Gaplus | 14.66 | Thunder Storm (Cobra Command) | 15.83 | |
| June | Vs. Baseball | 14.79 | Thunder Storm (Cobra Command) | 15.76 | |
| July | Crowns Golf | 15.08 | Thunder Storm (Cobra Command) | 15.44 | |
| August | Karate Champ | 15.58 | Thunder Storm (Cobra Command) | 14.95 | |
| September | Jan Oh (Jang-Oh) | 16.89 | TX-1 V8 | 18 | |
| October | Night Gal | 15 | TX-1 V8 | 15.67 | |
| November | Jan Oh (Jang-Oh) | 14.68 | TX-1 V8 | 16.92 | |
| December | Night Gal | 14.36 | Super Don Quix-ote | 17 | |

==== United Kingdom and United States ====
The following titles were the highest-grossing arcade games of 1984 in the United Kingdom and United States.

| Rank | United Kingdom | | United States | | | | | |
| Rank | Title | Manufacturer | RePlay | AMOA | | | Play Meter | |
| Rank | Title | Manufacturer | RePlay | Arcade | Route/Street | Video | Title | Points |
|---|---|---|---|---|---|---|---|---|
| 1 | Track & Field | Konami | Pole Position II | Pole Position | | | Dragon's Lair | 499.8 |
| 2 | Unknown | | Pole Position | Track & Field, Spy Hunter, M.A.C.H. 3, Punch-Out!! | Elevator Action, Spy Hunter, Pole Position II, Punch-Out!! | Spy Hunter, Ms. Pac-Man, Track & Field, Punch-Out!! | Pole Position | 459 |
| 3 | Unknown | | Unknown | Track & Field, Spy Hunter, M.A.C.H. 3, Punch-Out!! | Elevator Action, Spy Hunter, Pole Position II, Punch-Out!! | Spy Hunter, Ms. Pac-Man, Track & Field, Punch-Out!! | Track & Field | 370.6 |
| 4 | Unknown | | Unknown | Track & Field, Spy Hunter, M.A.C.H. 3, Punch-Out!! | Elevator Action, Spy Hunter, Pole Position II, Punch-Out!! | Spy Hunter, Ms. Pac-Man, Track & Field, Punch-Out!! | M.A.C.H. 3 | 280.6 |
| 5 | Unknown | | Unknown | Track & Field, Spy Hunter, M.A.C.H. 3, Punch-Out!! | Elevator Action, Spy Hunter, Pole Position II, Punch-Out!! | Spy Hunter, Ms. Pac-Man, Track & Field, Punch-Out!! | Spy Hunter | 256.5 |
| 6 | Unknown | | Unknown | —N/a | | | Star Wars | 205.7 |
| 7 | Unknown | | Unknown | —N/a | | | Space Ace | 192.6 |
| 8 | Unknown | | Unknown | —N/a | | | Punch-Out!! | 191.8 |
| 9 | Unknown | | Unknown | —N/a | | | Vs. Tennis | 170.8 |
| 10 | Unknown | | Unknown | —N/a | | | Astron Belt | 137.8 |

=== Best-selling home systems ===
| Rank | System(s) | Manufacturer | Type | Generation | Sales | |
| Rank | System(s) | Manufacturer | Type | Generation | Japan | Worldwide |
|---|---|---|---|---|---|---|
| 1 | Family Computer | Nintendo | Console | Third | 2,940,000 | 2,940,000 |
| 2 | Commodore 64 (C64) | Commodore | Computer | 8-bit | —N/a | 2,500,000 |
| 3 | IBM Personal Computer (PC) | IBM | Computer | 8-bit / 16-bit | —N/a | 2,000,000 |
| 4 | TI-99/4A | Texas Instruments | Computer | 16-bit | —N/a | 1,000,000+ |
| 5 | Apple II | Apple Inc. | Computer | 8-bit | —N/a | 1,000,000 |
| 6 | PC-88 / PC-98 | NEC | Computer | 8-bit / 16-bit | 470,000 | 470,000+ |
| 7 | Mac | Apple Inc. | Computer | 16-bit | —N/a | 370,000 |
| 8 | MSX | ASCII Corporation | Computer | 8-bit | 350,000 | 350,000+ |
| 9 | Adam | Coleco | Computer | 8-bit | —N/a | 255,000 |
| 10 | SG-1000 | Sega | Console | Third | 240,000 | 240,000+ |

=== Best-selling home video games in the United Kingdom ===
In the United Kingdom, the following titles were the top ten best-selling home computer games of 1984, according to N.O.P. Market Research.

| Rank | Title | Publisher | Genre | Platform |
|---|---|---|---|---|
| 1 | Jet Set Willy | Software Projects | Platform | ZX Spectrum |
| 2 | Fighter Pilot | Digital Integration | Combat flight sim | ZX Spectrum |
| 3 | Manic Miner | Bug-Byte/Software Projects | Platform | ZX Spectrum |
| 4 | Atic Atac | Ultimate Play the Game | Action-adventure | ZX Spectrum |
| 5 | Chequered Flag | Psion | Racing | ZX Spectrum |
| 6 | Hunchback | Ocean | Platform | ZX Spectrum |
| 7 | Sabre Wulf | Ultimate Play the Game | Action-adventure | ZX Spectrum |
| 8 | Night Gunner | Digital Integration | Shoot 'em up | ZX Spectrum |
| 9 | Jetpac | Ultimate Play the Game | Shoot 'em up | ZX Spectrum |
| 10 | Manic Miner | Software Projects | Platform | Commodore 64 |

== Major awards ==
- The fifth Arcade Awards are held, for games released during 1982–1983. Pole Position wins Coin-Op Game of the Year, Ms. Pac-Man and Lady Bug win console Videogames of the Year, Lode Runner wins Computer Game of the Year, and Q*bert wins dedicated Stand-Alone Game of the Year.
- In the second Golden Joystick Awards (held in 1985) for best home computer games, Knight Lore takes Game of the Year.

== Business ==
- New companies: Accolade, Elite Systems, Gremlin Graphics, Kemco, New World Computing, Novagen, Ocean, Psygnosis, Sculptured Software
- Defunct companies: Astrocade, Human Engineered Software, Imagine, Sirius, Starpath.
- Hasbro, Inc. acquires Milton Bradley Company.
- Management Sciences America acquires Edu-Ware Services.
- Broderbund acquires 8-bit gaming competitor Synapse Software.
- Atari shuts down the Atari Program Exchange, which sold notable "user written" games such as Eastern Front (1941) and Dandy.
- Warner Communications sells the Atari, Inc. home video game and home computer intellectual properties, including the Atari logo and trademark, inventories of home video game and home computer hardware and software, as well as certain international subsidiaries to Tramel Technology, but retains the arcade games division, which becomes Atari Games. Tramel Technology is promptly renamed to Atari Corporation.
- Sega and CSK merge to form Sega Enterprises Ltd.
- Mattel sells its video game assets, including the M Network and Intellivision hardware and software intellectual property, to a group led by a former Mattel Electronics executive that becomes INTV Corporation. Mattel Electronics closes their game development offices in California and Taiwan. The games development office in France is sold to investors and renamed Nice Ideas.
- The largest video game retailer in the world, GameStop was founded (then known as Babbage's) in Dallas, Texas.

== Notable releases ==
=== Games ===
==== Arcade ====
- February 17 - Nintendo launches the initial version of boxing game Punch-Out!!.
- April – Namco releases Gaplus, the sequel to Galaga.
- June – Atari releases "I, Robot", the first polygonal 3D game.
- July – Data East releases Technōs Japan's Karate Champ, laying the foundations for the one-one-one fighting game genre.
- July 20 – Namco releases action role-playing game The Tower of Druaga.
- October – Namco releases Pac-Land and lays the foundations for horizontally-scrolling platform games.
- November 1 – Namco releases Grobda, a spin-off from Xevious.
- December – Namco releases Super Xevious and Dragon Buster, the latter of which is one of the first games to feature a life bar.
- December – Capcom releases 1942.
- December – Irem releases Kung-Fu Master and lays the foundations for the beat 'em up genre.
- December – Atari Games releases Marble Madness, their first game written in the C programming language and to use a 68000-family microprocessor.
- Bally/Midway releases Demolition Derby, which features a damage bar and the ability to join a game in progress.

==== Computer ====
- January - Bullet-Proof Software releases The Black Onyx on the PC-8801, which helps popularize turn-based role-playing games in Japan.
- June - Ultimate Play the Game releases Sabre Wulf on the ZX Spectrum.
- September 20 – Elite, an influential wireframe 3D space trading game offering a then-unique open-ended design, is published by Acornsoft.
- October – Nihon Falcom releases action role-playing game Dragon Slayer.
- October - Automata UK releases Deus Ex Machina on the ZX Spectrum.
- December – T&E Soft releases Hydlide, an early action role-playing game that features a health regeneration mechanic and anticipates elements of The Legend of Zelda and Ys series.
- December 7 – Knight Lore by Ultimate Play the Game is released for the ZX Spectrum (and later ported to the BBC Micro, Amstrad CPC, MSX, and Famicom Disk System). It is the third title in the Sabreman series, but the first to use the isometric Filmation engine.
- Broderbund releases The Ancient Art of War by Dave and Barry Murry. It is a real-time tactics game and a precursor to the real-time strategy genre.
- Broderbund releases Karateka for the Apple II.
- The Lords of Midnight, a strategy adventure game by Mike Singleton, is released.
- Infocom releases The Hitchhiker's Guide to the Galaxy, Sorcerer, Cutthroats, and Seastalker.
- First Star releases Boulder Dash, which inspired enough clones to create the rocks-and-diamonds genre.
- Epyx releases Impossible Mission for the Commodore 64.
- Electronic Arts releases Adventure Construction Set.
- Sierra On-Line releases King's Quest I for the PCjr.
- Synapse releases the Atari 8-bit game Dimension X, over 9 months after running magazine ads showing features that were not present in the final game.
- Software Projects releases platform game Jet Set Willy on the ZX Spectrum.
- First Star Software releases Spy vs. Spy for the Commodore 64.
- Game Gems releases Flyer Fox for the ZX Spectrum and the Commodore 64.

==== Console ====
- March 30 - Activision releases H.E.R.O. for the Atari 2600.
- June 4 – Nintendo releases a conversion of their own Donkey Kong 3 for the Famicom.
- October 5 - Nintendo releases Devil World on the Famicom in Japan.
- December 17 – Nintendo releases Ice Climber and Balloon Fight for the Famicom.
- Activision releases Pitfall II: Lost Caverns, one of the last major titles for the Atari 2600. Each cartridge contains a custom chip allowing improved visuals and 4-voice sound.

=== Hardware ===
- January 24 – Apple Inc. announces the original, 128K, floppy disc-only, Macintosh 128K.
- March – IBM releases the IBM PCjr in an attempt to enter the home computer market. It has improved sound and graphics over the original, business-oriented IBM PC, but is a commercial failure.
- Atari, Inc. announces the Atari 7800, a next-gen console that's compatible with Atari 2600 cartridges, but capable of greatly improved visuals. It is shelved until 1986 due to the sale of the company and legal issues.
- Discontinued systems: Atari 5200, Magnavox Odyssey², Vectrex

== See also ==
- 1984 in games
