= Maziacs =

1983 video game

- Developer: DK'Tronics
- Publisher: DK'Tronics
- Designer: Don Priestley
- Programmer: Andy French (C64)
- Platforms: ZX Spectrum, Commodore 64, MSX
- Release: 1983
- Genre: Action adventure
- Mode: Single Player

Maziacs is an action adventure maze game published by DK'Tronics in 1983 for the ZX Spectrum, Commodore 64, and MSX.

== History ==
Maziacs, written by Don Priestley, was based on his earlier ZX81 game Mazogs which was published by Bug-Byte in 1982. Mazogs was one of the most successful ZX81 games so Don Priestley adapted it for the higher-resolution, colour-screen ZX Spectrum and MSX. The Commodore 64 port was written by Andy French.

== Gameplay ==

Maziacs takes place in a randomly generated, scrolling, overhead-view maze, in which the player-controlled protagonist must find gold and exit the level. The gold is placed at least 200 moves from the start position, and the maze is patrolled by monsters called maziacs. Prisoners are sometimes found in the walls of the maze, who can highlight the path to the gold for a short period of time. Moving through the maze and fighting maziacs decreases the player's energy, which can be replenished by finding food. The main game screen shows one fiftieth of the maze, but a "view mode" expands the view to show one twelfth. Whilst this mode is useful for scouting purposes, the player cannot move whilst viewing it.

Maziacs can only be killed effectively with swords, several of which are found in the maze but can only be used once. A sword cannot be carried at the same time as the gold. These last two factors lead to the tactic of avoiding groups of maziacs, but killing as many as possible before collecting the gold.

Maziacs supported the Currah MicroSpeech peripheral.

== Reception ==
When Maziacs was published, critical reception was good. CRASH magazine awarded 82%, highlighting the appealing graphics and animation. In a retrospective later in the year, CRASH criticized the slightly unresponsive keyboard controls and felt it was less addictive, but continued to praise the animation techniques.

Maziacs was ranked at number 99 in the Your Sinclair official top 100 ZX Spectrum games of all time, because of the game's claustrophobic atmosphere, choreographed animation, and general character.
