= Yogi Bear (video game) =

1987 video game

- Developer: Dalali
- Publisher: Piranha Software
- Platforms: Amstrad CPC; Commodore 64; ZX Spectrum
- Release: EU: 1987
- Genre: Action-adventure
- Mode: Single-player

Yogi Bear is an action-adventure video game developed by British studio Dalali and published in 1987 by Piranha Software. It was released in Europe for Amstrad CPC, Commodore 64, and ZX Spectrum. Yogi Bear sets out to rescue Boo-Boo after he is captured by a hunter. The game received praise for its graphics and criticism for its controls.

== Gameplay ==
Yogi Bear is a side-scrolling action-adventure game that takes place in Jellystone Park. Boo-Boo is captured by a hunter who intends to sell him to a circus, and it is up to Yogi Bear to rescue him. Playing as Yogi Bear, the player must travel across Jellystone Park and find Boo-Boo before a time limit runs out, while also avoiding numerous obstacles such as geysers and rivers. Enemies such as snakes, frogs, hunters, and Ranger Smith must also be avoided. Yogi can jump and duck to avoid obstacles, and can also disguise himself as a bush to hide from enemies. Yogi's energy gradually depletes as the game progresses, but it can be regained by eating food located in unaccompanied picnic baskets.

Cave entrances, accessible at certain points in the game, transport the player to random areas of the park. In some cases, the player will be transported closer to Boo-Boo's location after using a cave, while other times the player will be sent further back. Upon finding Boo-Boo, the player must walk across stepping stones in a certain order. Located throughout the game are toffee apples that have been left behind by Boo-Boo. The player has the option of collecting the apples, which will later inform the player of which stones to step upon. However, using cave entrances to skip ahead in the game can result in some apples being passed up.

== Reception ==
Reception

Review scores
Publication	Score
ACE	752 (Amstrad CPC/C64)
Crash	62% (ZX Spectrum); 48% (ZX Spectrum re-release)
Sinclair User	7/10 (ZX Spectrum)
Your Sinclair	8/10 (ZX Spectrum)
Zzap!64	61% (C64)
Commodore User	8/10 (C64)
Power Play	4.5/10 (C64)

Yogi Bear was praised for its graphics and character sprites. Bohden Buciak of Commodore User praised the smooth scrolling and wrote that mountains in the background scroll by slower than the foreground for a "true 3D effect". Some reviewers also praised the music. Critics believed the game would have particular appeal for younger players, as well as Yogi Bear fans. The Games Machine stated that Dalali managed to retain the Yogi Bear character's charm and "bind it up in a game of reasonable ingenuity." Andy Smith of ACE praised the game, stating that it would have instant appeal for young players and "plenty of attraction for the old-timers too." ACE found the Amstrad CPC version to be as colourful as the C64 version.

The game received criticism for its poor controls. Tony Worrall of Your Sinclair considered the game's collision detection poor, but stated that it sometimes works in the player's favor as a result. Despite its simplicity, Worrall considered the game addictive. Tamara Howard of Sinclair User considered the game fun but bizarre. Paul Boughton of Computer and Video Games described the game as a "simple left to right scrolling effort which lacked any immediate hookability to keep me playing." Anatol Locker of Power Play also found the game to be monotonous, citing its lack of variety.

Phil King of Crash reviewed a 1989 budget re-release of the game and stated that while the characters look great, the "'cardboard cut-out' 3-D is confusing, with dodgy collision detection making it almost unplayable."
