= Mazogs =

1982 video game

- Developer(s): Don Priestley
- Publisher(s): Bug-Byte (ZX81); Softsync (TS1000)
- Platform(s): ZX81, Timex Sinclair 1000
- Release: 1982
- Genre(s): Maze

Mazogs is a maze video game developed by Don Priestley and published for the ZX81 by Bug-Byte in 1982. It was subsequently licensed by Softsync and published in the US for the Timex Sinclair 1000.

Don Priestley followed up the game with Maziacs for the ZX Spectrum.

== Reception ==
Dick Olney for Personal Computer World said "Overall, this is undoubtably one of the best games of its type which I've played on the ZX81.

Arthur B. Hunkins for Compute! said "Mazogs is an excellent, single-player, treasure/maze game [...] Its full screen graphics make excellent use of the Sinclair/Timex capability."

Fred Blechman for Electronic Fun with Computers & Games said "Highly recommended - unless you already have high blood pressure."
