= 3D Tanx =

1982 video game

- Publisher: DK'Tronics
- Designer: Don Priestley
- Platforms: ZX Spectrum, Commodore 64, BBC Micro
- Release: 1982
- Genre: Shoot 'em up
- Mode: Single-player

3D Tanx is a shoot 'em up video game written by Don Priestley and published by DK'Tronics in 1982 for the ZX Spectrum, Commodore 64, and BBC Micro.

== Gameplay ==
The aim of the game is to shoot tanks moving across a bridge, shown in the distance into the screen. The player aims a gun turret by adjusting its rotation and elevation, this being the '3D' aspect of the game. Skill and timing is required to strike the tanks.

== Reception ==
Crash magazine wrote, "The graphics are very good and so is the sound," and concluded,"...and at the price, excellent value."
