= The Trap Door (video game) =

1986 video game

- Developer: Don Priestley
- Publisher: Piranha Software
- Composer: David Dunn (Commodore 64)
- Platforms: Amstrad CPC, Commodore 64, ZX Spectrum
- Release: 1986
- Genre: Action-adventure
- Mode: Single-player

The Trap Door is a video game published for the ZX Spectrum in 1986 by Piranha Software and ported to the Amstrad CPC and Commodore 64 by Five Ways Software. It was written by Don Priestley and based on the British children's television show of the same name.

== Gameplay ==
Gameplay

In Trap Door, the player takes control of Berk, who must perform tasks for "The Thing Upstairs", a never-seen entity who lives in the upper floors of the castle where Berk works. In order to help him complete his task, Berk must make use of the many objects lying around his part of the castle as well as the creatures that emerge from the trap door. Berk is assisted by Boni, a talking skull, who provides hints when picked up. He is also somewhat hindered by Drutt, Berk's pet who loves eating worms, as well as The Thing's impatience which manifests in form of a time limit for each task.

Gameplay is largely based around puzzle-solving and the use and manipulation of the many objects littered around Berk's chambers. Berk will also need help from some of the strange creatures that lurk in the caverns under the trap door and these creatures can often be as much a hindrance as a help (as well as downright dangerous). Once Berk has finished taking advantage of a creature's "assistance" he also has to find a way of making sure it goes back down the trap door.

The game has two different skill levels: "Learner Berk" and "Super Berk". The difference is that "Super Berk" mode includes flying ghosts that appear a set time after each task is announced. The ghosts hinder the player's progress by attacking Berk, sending him spinning into another room if he does not manage to avoid them.

=== Tasks ===
Over the course of the game, The Thing asks Berk for four meals:

1. A can of worms that must be collected once they come through the Trap Door.
2. Crushed eyeballs which grow as plants and must be squeezed in a cauldron using a pogo stick monster.
3. Boiled "slimies" that must be collected in a swamp in the cellar and boiled in the cauldron using a fire-breathing monster on wheels.
4. Fried eggs which must be acquired by hitting a bird with a suppository-shaped projectile

After each meal is done, Berk must deliver it upstairs using a dumbwaiter.

Once all four meals have been delivered on time, Berk must clean up the castle by shoving every monster—including Boni and Drutt—down the Trap Door; if the game is in "Super Berk" mode, The Thing will then send down a safe as a reward, which Berk must crack open to complete the game successfully.

== Development ==
To promote the release of The Trap Door, Piranha Software partnered with Computer Gamer magazine to run a contest wherein readers submitted recipes for the Thing Upstairs, and 25 winning entrants received a copy of the game.

== Reception ==
Reception

Review scores
Publication	Score
Crash	88% (Spectrum)
Computer and Video Games	35/40 (Spectrum)
Sinclair User	5/5 (Spectrum)
Your Sinclair	9/10 (Spectrum)
Computer Gamer	19/20 (Spectrum)

Awards
Publication	Award
ZX Computing	Monster Hit
Sinclair User	SU Classic
C+VG	C+VG Hit

The game was runner up for the "Best Original Game" of the year award at the 1987 Golden Joystick Awards.

== Legacy ==
The Trap Door was followed by a sequel in 1987 called Through The Trap Door, also written by Priestley and published by Piranha. This sequel is a multi-level platform game in which the player can switch between controlling Berk and Drutt.

== See also ==
- Flunky
