= Don Priestley =

British video game programmer

- Born: 1940
- Died: 2024 (aged 83–84)
- Occupations: School teacher; video game designer; programmer
- Years active: 1982–1989
- Known for: Video games on the ZX Spectrum

Don Priestley (1940–2024) was a British school teacher and former video game programmer who wrote over 20 commercial games for the ZX81 and ZX Spectrum home computers between 1982 and 1989. Despite successful releases for DK'Tronics, such as 3D Tanx and Maziacs, Priestley returned to teaching in the late 1980s, claiming changes in the video game industry did not suit his style of work. He died after a short illness in the autumn of 2024.

== Games development ==
Until 1979, Don Priestley was a teacher. In 1981 both he and his son enrolled in a Pascal course at night school. Although his son dropped out, he carried on. One of his early programs was an adaptation of Conway's Game of Life which was converted to a newly purchased Sinclair ZX81.

His first commercial game was The Damsel and the Beast, published by Bug-Byte, and inspired by a program called Mugwump. Further ZX81 games written freelance were Dictator (a successful strategy game later ported to the Spectrum) and Mazogs (which was later rewritten for the Spectrum as Maziacs).

Priestley joined DK'Tronics as a director in March 1983. There he developed 3D Tanx, which was critically well-received and his most successful game. It sold around 5000 copies per month for 15 months. This was followed by Spawn of Evil which reached the top of the charts in May 1983. He also wrote Popeye for DK'Tronics. Released in 1985, its point of differentiation was having huge, colourful sprites, amongst the largest seen on the Spectrum. This distinct graphical style happened by chance:

The licensors, King Features — were at pains to point out that any game had to include fair representations of the central cartoon characters, so I sat down with a large grid and came up with a figure of Popeye which was seven characters high and six wide — 42 characters to move for each frame!

— Don Priestley, CRASH #34

In 1986, Macmillan Publishers re-released Popeye and approached Priestley to use the same techniques on a launch title for its new label, Piranha Software. The Trap Door, based on the animated series of the same name, won multiple awards from the press and has been described as one of the best games ever released for the ZX Spectrum.

Priestley would go on to use the same style in the sequel Through The Trapdoor (1987), Flunky (1987) and Gregory Loses his Clock (1989) but by the late eighties, Priestley felt that games development was moving away from single developers to team development. These changes did not suit Priestley's style of work and he left the games industry to return to teaching.

== Games ==
=== Sinclair ZX81 ===
- The Damsel and the Beast (1981, Bug-Byte)
- Mission of the Deep (1981, Macronics)
- Dictator (1982, Bug-Byte)
- Sabotage (1982, Macronics)
- City Patrol (1982, Macronics)
- Mazogs (1982, Bug Byte)

=== ZX Spectrum ===
- 3D Tanx (1982, DK'Tronics)
- Meteoroids (1982, DK'Tronics)
- Dictator (1983, DK'Tronics)
- Maziacs (1983, DK'Tronics)
- Jumbly (1983, DK'Tronics)
- Spawn of Evil (1983, DK'Tronics)
- Minder (1985, DK'Tronics)
- Popeye (1985, DK'Tronics)
- Benny Hill's Madcap Chase (1985, DK'Tronics)
- The Trap Door (1986, Piranha Software)
- Flunky (1987, Piranha Software)
- Through the Trap Door (1987, Piranha Software)
- Target (1988, Summit Software)
- Up for Grabs (1988, Summit Software)
- Gregory Loses His Clock (1989, Mastertronic)
