= Flunky (video game) =

1987 video game

- Developer: Don Priestley
- Publisher: Piranha Software
- Platforms: ZX Spectrum, Commodore 64, Amstrad CPC
- Release: 1987
- Genre: Adventure
- Mode: Single-player

Flunky is an adventure game by Don Priestley for the ZX Spectrum, Commodore 64 and Amstrad CPC. It was published in 1987 by Piranha Software. The player takes control of a flunky in the service of the British royal family. The flunky is given orders by various members of the family which he must carry out. When he is successful in completing a task, he can obtain an autograph from the satisfied individual. Once he has successfully completed tasks for several persons he can go on to perform the final task for the Queen herself.

== Gameplay ==
Screenshot

The player controls the flunky as he moves around Buckingham Palace, carrying out orders that members of the Royal Family will give him. The flunky can only be given one task to do at a time. The solutions needed to complete the tasks range from the correct use of items in the correct places to tasks requiring skillful playing more reminiscent of action games.

The game includes members of the Royal Family: the Prince of Wales, Diana, Princess of Wales, the Duke of York, the Duchess of York, and the Queen.

== Development ==
Flunky was developed by Don Priestley and published by Piranha Software.

== Reception ==
Reception

Review scores
Publication	Score
Crash	60%
Computer and Video Games	32/40
