= Split Personalities (video game) =

1986 video game

- Developers: Ernieware; Enigma Variations (Game Boy)
- Publishers: Domark; Imagineer (Game Boy)
- Composer: David Whittaker
- Platforms: ZX Spectrum, Amstrad CPC, Commodore 64, Plus/4, Game Boy
- Release: 1986
- Genre: Puzzle
- Mode: Single-player

Split Personalities (first released as Splitting Images) is a sliding square puzzle video game that involves piecing together the faces of famous personalities and politicians. The game was developed for the ZX Spectrum by Ernieware and published by Domark, who also ported the game to the Amstrad CPC, Commodore 64, and Plus/4. The game was later released in 1993 for the Game Boy under the name Splitz.

== Gameplay ==
The game presents a blank grid for the player to engage with. The player controls a flashing cursor which can be moved at will over the canvas. Puzzle pieces are brought into play by pressing the fire button on a dispenser in the top corner of the grid. Pieces can then be slid about the screen. When a piece is moved, it can only be stopped by the walls of the play area or by another puzzle piece. A miniature preview of the completed image acts as a guide for the player and also highlights the piece of the puzzle that is currently being controlled.

There are a total of ten puzzles in the game. The personalities featured (in order of appearance) are: Ronald Reagan, Margaret Thatcher, Neil Kinnock, Clive Sinclair, Alan Sugar, Humphrey Bogart, Charles and Diana, Fergie and Andrew, Mick Jagger and Marilyn Monroe. A modified version was produced for the German market, with Helmut Kohl in place of Reagan. A third revision was produced for the Commodore 64 which was included with Commodore's Mindbenders/Night Moves C64 bundle in 1990 which, in addition to the replacement of Reagan with Kohl, also replaced Sinclair with Nelson Mandela and Sugar with Mikhail Gorbachev.

In addition to the puzzle pieces, there are also special tiles that yield bonus points if combined correctly, which include tiles based on the personality of the puzzle, often with political or satirical themes. For example, on the Thatcher level, combining 'Dennis' [sic] and gin and tonic will yield bonus points. Other tiles include time bombs which need to either be ejected from the playing field by sliding them towards one of the holes on the sides or combined with a water tap tile.

== Release ==
Domark were forced to rename the game following legal proceedings from satirical TV puppet show Spitting Image who claimed that the original cover artwork and title, Splitting Images, was too close to the name of their show. Domark would later produce an unrelated, officially licensed Spitting Image game.

== Reception ==
Reception

Awards
Publication	Award
Crash	Crash Smash!
Your Sinclair	Megagame

== Legacy ==
In 1993, Imagineer released a Game Boy version called Splitz, known in Japan as Splitz: Nigaoe 15 Game. The game was only released in Europe and Japan, and never saw release in North America.

While the mechanics of the game stayed the same, the puzzles and bonus blocks were changed. Like the original game, there are ten stages, with the addition of three bonus stages, which occur after three levels are completed. In the bonus stages, the player arranges the tiles in a more traditional way of a sliding puzzle. Some of the caricature puzzles include Abraham Lincoln, Albert Einstein, and Elvis Presley. However, Ronald Reagan and Marilyn Monroe were kept in the game, but moved to other levels.
