= DK'Tronics =

UK business

DK'Tronics Ltd
- Industry: video games; Computer hardware
- Founded: 1981; 45 years ago
- Defunct: 24 May 1993
- Fate: Dissolved
- Headquarters: Great Yarmouth, England
- Key people: David Heelas (managing director); Neil Rawlinson (finance director)

DK'Tronics Ltd (stylised as dk'tronics) was a British software and hardware company active during the 1980s. It primarily made peripherals for the ZX Spectrum and Amstrad CPC range, but also released video games for the ZX81, ZX Spectrum, Commodore 64, VIC-20, BBC Micro, Memotech MTX, MSX and Amstrad platforms.

== History ==
The company's first product was a 16Kb expansion pack for the ZX80, released just prior to the launch of the ZX81. At this time the company consisted only of David Heelas, working part-time through his interest in electronics. When the ZX81 was launched, he went full-time manufacturing, packaging and posting from his home – and by the end of 1981 he had four employees. Hardware production expanded to include new keyboards for the ZX81 and for the newly released ZX Spectrum.

By 1984, DK'Tronics had around 50 personnel, with Heelas as managing director. He was also looking into the possibility of becoming a computer manufacturer, specifically with a low-cost processor for the leisure market. It was planned to have an integrated screen and music keyboard.

DK'Tronics published games between 1982 and 1985, and included works from programmers such as Don Priestley, who became a director of the company in 1983. David Heelas was known to be critical of the hype attempted by other software companies in the gaming press and took pride in the professional position adopted by DK'Tronics.

== Games ==
- Meteoroids (1982)
- 3D Tanx (1982)
- Dictator (1983)
- Spawn of Evil (1983)
- Maziacs (1983)
- Jumbly (1983)
- Zig Zag (1984)
- Minder (1985)
- Popeye (1985)
- Benny Hill's Madcap Chase (1985)
