= List of video game publishers =

This is a list of video game publisher companies. A video game publisher may specialize in only publishing games for developers,or may either have in-house development studios or own subsidiary development companies. Some developers may publish their games themselves.

This list includes both active and inactive companies. Active publishers are either run independently or as a subsidiary of another company. Inactive publishers may either be defunct outright or still exist but no longer involved in video game publishing.

Legend
active independently
active as subsidiary of larger game publisher
defunct / no longer active in video game publishing

Publisher	Location	Est.	Notable games published	Notes
07th Expansion	Japan	2002	Higurashi When They Cry; Umineko When They Cry; Ciconia When They Cry	
10tons	Tampere, Finland	2003	Neon Chrome	Also a developer.
11 bit studios	Warsaw, Poland	2010	Frostpunk; This War of Mine; Moonlighter	video game developer, marketer, and distributor
1C Company	Moscow, Russia	1991	Il-2 series Men of War series	specializes in localization for Russia
20th Century Games	Century City, California, United States	2022	Aliens: Dark Descent	Licensor for games based on 20th Century Studios properties
2K Games	Novato, California, United States	2005	NBA 2K; WWE 2K	video game marketer and distributor; subsidiary and publishing label of Take-Two Interactive
3D Realms	Garland, Texas, United States	1987	Duke Nukem series	video game developer; also known as Apogee Software, Ltd.; acquired by Embracer Group in 2021
The 3DO Company	Redwood City, California, United States	1991	Army Men	video game and video game console developer
505 Games	Milan, Italy	2006		publishing division of Digital Bros. group
7th Level	Dallas, Texas, United States	1993	Monty Python's Complete Waste of Time	defunct 1998
Aackosoft	Zoeterwoude, Netherlands	1983	various MSX games	defunct 1988
Aardvark Software	United Kingdom	1983	Frak!	defunct 1989
ABC Software	Buchs, St. Gallen, Switzerland	1991		acquired by Electronic Arts in 1998
Absolute Entertainment	Upper Saddle River, New Jersey, United States	1986	A Boy and His Blob: Trouble on Blobolonia	defunct 1995
Access Software	Salt Lake City, Utah, United States	1982	Tex Murphy	acquired by Microsoft in 1999; defunct 2006
Acclaim Entertainment	Glen Cove, New York, United States	1987	Turok; Burnout; WWF WrestleMania	brand name acquired by Acclaim Games; intellectual property acquired by Throwback Entertainment
Accolade	California, United States	1984	Hardball! series Star Control series Test Drive series	video game developer; acquired by Atari, SA née Infogrames in 1999, name retired
Acornsoft	Cambridge, England, United Kingdom	1980	various Acorn Electron games	rights sold to Superior Software in 1986
Acquire	Tokyo, Japan	1994	Akiba's Trip	formerly a subsidiary of GungHo Online Entertainment, now owned by Kadokawa Corporation
Active Gaming Media AGM	Osaka, Japan	2006		PLAYISM part of Active Gaming Media Inc., focuses on the localization and distribution of video games
Activision	Santa Monica, California, United States	1979	Call of Duty; Guitar Hero; Spyro; Pitfall!	video game developer; acquired Neversoft in 1999 and Infinity Ward in 2003; acquired several other developers as well; merged with Vivendi to form Activision Blizzard in 2008
Activision Blizzard	Santa Monica, California, United States	2008		formed by merger between Activision and Vivendi Games in 2008; acquired by Microsoft in 2023
Addictive Games	Milton Keynes, England, United Kingdom	1982	Football Manager	acquired by Prism Leisure Corporation in 1987, which continued to use the Addictive Games label until 1992
The Adventure Company	Toronto, Ontario, Canada	2002	Still Life	label of DreamCatcher Interactive until 2006, of JoWooD Productions Software from then until 2011, and of Nordic Games since then
Adventure International	Longwood, Florida, United States	1978	Adventureland	defunct 1985
Adventure Soft	Birmingham, England, United Kingdom	1983	Simon the Sorcerer	still sells old games but no longer publishes new games under the name
Affect	Japan	1990	Nolan Ryan's Baseball	defunct 2008
Agatsuma Entertainment	Tokyo, Japan	1997	Drawn to Life	defunct 2016
Âge	Tokyo, Japan	1999	Akane Maniax	division of Acid Co., Ltd
AGEod	Grenoble, France	2005	Birth of America	acquired by Paradox Interactive in 2009 and renamed to Paradox France; they became independent in 2012 and their games are now published by The Slitherine Group
Agetec	Sunnyvale, California, United States	1998		focuses on distributing Japanese titles in the US
Aggro Crab	Seattle, Washington, United States	2019	Another Crab's Treasure	
Akabeisoft2	Japan	2005	Sharin no Kuni: The Girl Among the Sunflowers	
Akella	Moscow, Russia	1995	Age of Sail II; Age of Pirates series Sea Dogs	video game developer; defunct 2012
Akupara Games	Los Angeles, California, United States	2016	Whispering Willows; The Metronomicon: Slay the Dance Floor	video game developer, does console and mobile porting
Aksys	Torrance, California, United States	2006	Guilty Gear series	
ALcot	Japan	2003	Clover Heart's	
Alawar	Novosibirsk, Russia	1999	Beholder; Do Not Feed the Monkeys; Farm Frenzy	video game developer, marketer, and distributor
AliceSoft	Japan	1989	Tournament of the Gods	
AlphaDream	Tokyo, Japan	2000	Koto Battle: Tengai no Moribito	no longer publishes video games
ADK	Ageo, Saitama, Japan	1980	Exciting Soccer	known as Alpha Denshi Corporation in 1993; defunct 2003
Alchemist	Tokyo, Japan	1991	Baldr Force	defunct 2016
All in! Games	Kraków, Poland	2018	Chernobylite (PS4, Xbox One)	
Alligata	Sheffield, United Kingdom	1983	Blagger	acquired by Superior Software in 1987
Alten8	Luton, England, United Kingdom	2005	Space Tanks	video game developer
Alternative Software	Castleford, United Kingdom	1985	Count Duckula	
Amazon Games	Seattle, Washington, United States	2012	The Grand Tour Game	software publishing arm of Amazon
American Game Cartridges	Chandler, Arizona, United States	1990	Chillder	defunct 1994
American Laser Games	Albuquerque, New Mexico, United States	1989	Mad Dog McCree	acquired by its former division, Her Interactive, in 1999
American Video Entertainment	San Jose, California, United States	1990	Wally Bear and the NO! Gang	published last game in 1994
Amplitude Studios	Paris, France	2011	Endless Space	acquired by Sega in 2016 and their games are now published by Sega
Amsoft	Brentwood, Essex, United Kingdom	1984	various Amstrad CPC games	publishing arm of Amstrad until 1989
ANALOG Software	Worcester, Massachusetts, United States	1981	various Atari 8-bit games	software publishing arm of ANALOG Computing; defunct 1989
Antic Software	Marion, Ohio, United States	1982	Caverns of Mars II	software publishing arm of Antic; defunct 1990
APF Electronics Inc.	New York City, United States	1970	APF TV Fun	defunct 1983
Apogee Software	United States	2008		video game developer
Apple Inc.	Cupertino, California, United States	1976	Lemonade Stand	known as Apple Computer until 2007
Aquaplus	Osaka, Japan	1994	Utawarerumono	
AQ Interactive	Tokyo, Japan	2005	Bullet Witch	Merged into Marvelous Entertainment in 2011
Arcadia Systems	Costa Mesa, California, United States	1987	Silver Surfer	division of Mastertronic; defunct 1991
Arcen Games	Durham, North Carolina, United States	2009	AI War series A Valley Without Wind series The Last Federation	
Arc System Works	Tokyo, Japan	1988	BlazBlue series Guilty Gear series	video game developer
Argus Press	United Kingdom	1966	Nether Earth	published games through its Argus Press Software division, which was acquired in 1987 and renamed Grandslam Entertainment
Arika	Tokyo, Japan	1995	Technicbeat; Tetris: The Grand Master	video game developer
Ariolasoft	Germany	1983		software publishing arm of Ariola Records; reëstablished as United Software in 1990
Aristocrat	Sydney, Australia	1953		In July 2014, Aristocrat agreed to buy Video Gaming Technologies for about $1.3 billion to triple its North American business amid falling profit in Australia. On 10 August 2017, the company acquired mobile game developer Plarium for $500 million to enter into mobile gaming. On 30 November 2017, they then acquired mobile game developer Big Fish Games for US$990 million.
Armor Games	United States	2005		published flash titles before branching out into mobile, PC, and console markets
Arsys Software	Tokyo, Japan	1985	Star Cruiser	defunct 2001
Artdink	Tokyo, Japan	1986	A-Train	
Artic Computing	Brandesburton, United Kingdom	1980	Bear Bovver	defunct 1986
Arush Entertainment	Scottsdale, Arizona, United States	1999	Duke Nukem: Manhattan Project	acquired by HIP Interactive in 2004; defunct 2005
Arxel Tribe	Slovenia	1989	The Legend of the Prophet and the Assassin	last game published in 2003
Ascaron	Gütersloh, Germany	1992	The Patrician	known as Ascom until 1996; defunct 2009; most assets acquired by Kalypso Media
Asmik Corporation of America	Japan	1985		merged with Ace Entertainment
Asmodee	Quartier Villaroy, Guyancourt, France	1995	Scythe: Digital Edition	
Aspyr Media	Austin, Texas, United States	1996		acquired by Embracer Group in 2021
Astragon	Düsseldorf, Germany	2000	Family Park Tycoon	
Astra Logical	Torrance, California, United States	2024	Kaizen: A Factory Story	
Asymmetric Publications	Arizona, United States		Kingdom of Loathing	
Atari, Inc	Sunnyvale, California, United States	1972	Pong; Breakout; Asteroids; Centipede	bought by Warner Bros. in 1976; closed 1984, assets split between Atari Corporation and Atari Games
Atari Corporation	Sunnyvale, California, United States	1984	Electrocop	founded as Tramel Technology, Ltd. in 1984; acquired Atari name shortly thereafter; reverse-merged with JMS Inc. in 1996
Atari Games	Milpitas, California, United States	1984	Gauntlet	published console games under the Tengen label; subsidiary of Time Warner until its acquisition by WMS Industries in 1996, which spun it off as a subsidiary of Midway Games in 1998; renamed to Midway Games West at the same time; dissolved in 2003
Atari, SA	Paris, France	2003	Enter the Matrix; Transformers; Unreal Tournament 2004; Star Trek Online	formerly GT Interactive, became full subsidiary of Atari, SA in 2008
AtariAge	United States	1998	Adventure II	
Athena	Japan	1987	Sword Master	no longer publishes video games, acquired by Hamster Corporation in 2023
Atlantis Software	London, England, United Kingdom	1984	Cops 'n' Robbers	defunct 1992
Artech Digital Entertainment	Ottawa, Ontario, Canada	1982	Mystery at the Museums	defunct 2011
ASCII Corporation	Tokyo, Japan	1977		acquired by Kadokawa Group Holdings in 2004
Atlus	Shinjuku, Tokyo, Japan	1986	Persona series Shin Megami Tensei series Devil Survivor series	video game developer; purchased by Sega in 2013
Attic Entertainment Software	Albstadt, Germany	1990	The Oath	defunct 2001
Audiogenic Limited	Reading, Berkshire, United Kingdom	1975	various Commodore PET games	defunct 1985; reformed as Audiogenic Software Ltd
Auran Development	Helensvale, Queensland, Australia	1995	SpellForce: The Order of Dawn	now known as N3V Games
Autumn Games	New York City, United States	2007	Skullgirls	focused on providing publishing services for independent developers for digital platforms
Avalon Hill	Renton, Washington, United States	1954	Achtung Spitfire!	acquired by Hasbro in 1998
Aventuras AD	Spain	1987	various text adventure games	defunct 1992
Aventurine SA	Athens, Greece	2002	Darkfall	video game developer
BAM! Entertainment	San Jose, California, United States	1999	Bujingai	dormant since 2004
Bandai Games	Shinagawa, Tokyo, Japan	1950		video game operations merged with Namco as Namco Bandai Games; no longer publishes video games
Bandai Namco Entertainment	Shinagawa, Tokyo, Japan	1955	Naruto: Ultimate Ninja	
Banpresto	Shinagawa, Tokyo, Japan	1977		acquired by Namco Bandai Holdings; no longer publishes video games
BBC Multimedia	London, England, United Kingdom	1995	Doctor Who: Destiny of the Doctors	defunct 2005
Beach Bum Ltd.	Ra'anana, Israel	2015		
Beagle Bros	San Diego, California, United States	1980	Beagle Bag	defunct 1991
Bergsala Lightweight	Tokyo, Japan	1995	Apron of Magic	
Berkeley Systems	Berkeley, California, United States	1987	You Don't Know Jack	acquired by Sierra in 1997; defunct 2000
Bethesda Softworks	Rockville, Maryland, United States	1986	Fallout 3, 4 and New Vegas; Elder Scrolls; Wolfenstein: The New Order; The Evil Within; Doom (2016)	video game developer; acquired by Microsoft in 2020
Big Ant Studios	Melbourne, Victoria, Australia	2001	Cricket 19	
Big Fish Games	Seattle, Washington, United States	2002	Virtual Villagers	acquired by Aristocrat Technologies in 2018
Big Five Software	Van Nuys, California, United States	1980	Miner 2049er	defunct 1984
Bilibili	Shanghai, China	2009	Guardian Tales	
Blue Byte	Düsseldorf, Germany	1988	The Settlers	video game developer; acquired by Ubisoft and their games are now published by Ubisoft
Broderbund	United States	1980	Myst; Prince of Persia	acquired by Ubisoft, eventually sold to The Learning Company; no longer publishes video games
Black Legend	Welwyn, United Kingdom	1993	Football Glory	defunct 1996
Blizzard Entertainment	Irvine, California, United States	1991	Diablo series StarCraft series Warcraft series Hearthstone; Heroes of the Storm; Overwatch	video game developer; acquired by Davidson & Associates in 1994, renamed from Silicon & Synapse; acquired by CUC International in 1996, which merged into Cendant in 1997 and was sold to Havas in 1998; acquired by Vivendi and become part of Vivendi Games group in 1998 merged into Activision Blizzard in 2008
Blue Ribbon	Doncaster, United Kingdom	1985	3D Dotty	label of CDS Micro Systems; defunct 1991
Blumhouse Games	Los Angeles, California, United States	2023		video game publishing arm of Blumhouse Productions
Bohemia Interactive	Prague, Czech Republic	1999	ARMA series	
Box Office, Inc.	Saint Paul, Minnesota, United States	1987	ALF: The First Adventure	published last game in 1989
Brash Entertainment	Hollywood, California, United States	2007	Jumper: Griffin's Story	defunct 2008
Broccoli	Tokyo, Japan	1994	First Kiss Story II	
Bug-Byte	Liverpool, United Kingdom	1980	Manic Miner	
Bubble Bus Software	Tonbridge, Kent, United Kingdom	1982	Starquake	defunct 1989
BudgeCo	California, United States	1981	Raster Blaster	defunct 1983
Buka Entertainment	Moscow, Russia	1994	Pathologic	
BulkyPix	Vélizy-Villacoublay, France	2008	Please, Don't Touch Anything	defunct 2016
Bullet-Proof Software	Japan	1980	The Black Onyx	defunct
Bungie	Bellevue, Washington	1991	Destiny series Marathon Trilogy; Abuse	video game developer; formerly a subsidiary of Microsoft; formerly had a publishing deal with Activision, now an "independent subsidiary" of Sony Interactive Entertainment as of 2022
C&E	Taipei, Taiwan	1990	Super Fighter	no longer publishes video games
California Pacific Computer Company	Davis, California, United States	1979	Akalabeth: World of Doom	defunct 1983
Camerica	Chicago, Illinois	1988		
Canal+ Multimedia	France	1984	Paris 1313	publishing arm of the Canal+ Group; no longer publishes video games
Candy Soft	Japan	1996	Tsuyokiss	
Capcom	Osaka, Japan	1979	Mega Man series Street Fighter series Resident Evil series Devil May Cry series	video game developer
Capstone Software	Miami, Florida, United States	1984	William Shatner's TekWar	subsidiary of IntraCorp; defunct 1996
Casady & Greene	United States	1984	Sky Shadow	defunct 2003
Cases Computer Simulations	London, England, United Kingdom	1982	Arnhem	published last game in 1994
Cave	Tokyo, Japan	1994	DoDonPachi SaiDaiOuJou	
Cavedog Entertainment	Bothell, Washington, United States	1995	Total Annihilation	defunct 2000
CBS Electronics	United States	1982	K-Razy Shoot-Out	closed in 1984
CD Projekt Red	Warsaw, Poland	1994	The Witcher series	
CDS Software	Doncaster, United Kingdom	1982	European Superleague	reformed as iDigicon Ltd in 2002
CDV Software Entertainment AG	Bruchsal, Germany	1989		defunct 2010
Centuri	Hialeah, Florida, United States	1969	Vanguard	known as Allied Leisure until 1980; defunct 1985
ChessBase	Hamburg, Germany	1986	various chess programs	
Chucklefish	London, England, United Kingdom	2011	Stardew Valley; Starbound; Eastward (video game)	A video game developer and publisher
Cinemax	Prague, Czech Republic	1998	Memento Mori	
CI Games	Warsaw, Poland	2002	Sniper: Ghost Warrior	video game developer; also known as City Interactive
Cinematronics	El Cajon, California, United States	1975	Dragon's Lair	acquired by Tradewest in 1987 and renamed to Leland Corporation
Cinemaware	Burlingame, California, United States	1985	Defender of the Crown	defunct 1991; reëstablished as Cinemaware Inc. in 2000
Cloud Imperium Games	Manchester, Uk	2012	Star Citizen Squadron 42	
Club Kidsoft	Los Gatos, California, United States	1992	various edutainment games	defunct
The Coca-Cola Company	Atlanta, Georgia	1886	Pepsi Invaders	no longer publishes video games
Codemasters	Warwickshire, United Kingdom	1985	Dizzy series Overlord	video game developer; acquired by Electronic Arts in 2021
Coktel Vision	Paris, France	1985	Emmanuelle	acquired by Sierra in 1993
Coleco	United States	1932		video game console (ColecoVision and Telstar) and video game developer; revived in 2005, after being defunct since 1988
Color Dreams	United States	1988		video game developer
CommaVid	Aurora, Illinois, United States	1981	Video Life	defunct 1983
Commercial Data Systems	Emerald Park, Saskatchewan, Canada	1982	Frantic Freddie	exited the video game industry in 1990
Commodore	West Chester, Pennsylvania, United States	1954	Radar Rat Race	defunct 1994
Compile	Japan	1982	Aleste; Puyo Puyo; Zanac	defunct 2003, acquired by D4 Enterprise, rights to Puyo Puyo sold to Sega in 1998
Compile Heart	Tokyo, Japan	2006	Record of Agarest War	subsidiary of Idea Factory
CompuServe	Columbus, Ohio, United States	1969	Island of Kesmai	defunct 2009
Computer and Video Games	Bath, Somerset, England, United Kingdom	1981	The Thompson Twins Adventure	label of Future Publishing; also known as C&VG, CVG, or C+VG; defunct 2004
Conspiracy Entertainment	Santa Monica, California, United States	1997		video game developer
Core Design	Derby, England, United Kingdom	1988	Corporation; Chuck Rock	acquired by Eidos Interactive in 1996; defunct 2010
Cosmi Corporation	Carson, California, United States	1982	Forbidden Forest, The President is Missing	
Crave Entertainment	Newport Beach, California, United States	1997		
Creative Computing	United States	1974	various Atari 8-bit games	defunct 1985
CM Games	Tallinn, Estonia	2010		
Creatures	Tokyo, Japan	1995	Chee-Chai Alien	no longer publishes video games
CRL Group	London, England, United Kingdom	1982	Tau Ceti	published last game in 1989
Cronosoft	United Kingdom	2002	various homebrew ZX Spectrum games	
Culture Brain Excel	Tokyo, Japan	1980		
Cryo Interactive	Paris, France	1989	Seven Games of the Soul	defunct 2002; assets acquired by Dreamcatcher Interactive
Crystal Computing	Manchester, United Kingdom	1982	Halls of the Things	reëstablished as Design Design in 1984
Crystal Dynamics	Redwood City, California, United States	1992	Gex	video game developer; acquired by Eidos Interactive in 1998
Crytek	Frankfurt, Germany	1999	Robinson: The Journey	video game developer
Crytivo Games	San Diego, California, United States	2013	The Universim and many other indie games of different genres	
CTW Inc.	Tokyo, Japan	2013	various browser games.	Japanese anime IP based browser game publisher
Cyberdreams	Calabasas, California, United States	1990	Dark Seed	defunct 1997
Cybersoft	North Miami Beach, Florida	1994	Air Cavalry	label of GameTek; last game published in 1995
D3 Publisher	Tokyo, Japan	1996	Last Escort series Vitamin series Simple series	
Daedalic Entertainment	Hamburg, Germany	2007	Edna & Harvey: The Breakout	
DarXabre	The Netherlands	2001	Hooligans: Storm Over Europe	defunct
Datamost	Chatsworth, California, United States	1981	Aztec	defunct 1985
Datam Polystar	Tokyo, Japan	1990	Cacoma Knight	no longer publishes video games
Datasoft	Chatsworth, California, United States	1980	Bruce Lee	reformed as IntelliCreations in 1987
Data Age	California, United States	1982	Journey Escape	defunct 1983
Data Becker	Düsseldorf, Germany	1980	America	defunct 2014
Data East	Tokyo, Japan	1976	BurgerTime; Fighter's History; Joe & Mac; Magical Drop; Glory of Heracles; Karnov	defunct 2003; acquired by G-Mode and Paon DP
Davidson & Associates	Torrance, California, United States	1983	Math Blaster!	acquired by CUC International in 1996; defunct 1999
Davilex Games	Houten, The Netherlands	1997	A2 Racer	ceased publishing video games in 2005
Davka	Chicago, Illinois, United States	1982	Apple II games	no longer publishes video games
Daybreak Game Company	California, United States	1995	DC Universe Online	video game developer; formerly known as Sony Online Entertainment; acquired by Enad Global 7 in 2020
dB-SOFT	Sapporo, Japan	1980	Flappy	defunct 2001
Deep Silver	Munich, Germany	2002	Metro series Saints Row series S.T.A.L.K.E.R. series	label of Koch Media; purchased video game developer Volition and the Metro franchise from THQ in 2013; acquired by THQ Nordic in 2018
Delphine Software International	Paris, France	1988	Future Wars	defunct 2004
Delta 4	United Kingdom	1984	Bored of the Rings	defunct 1992
Destination Software	Moorestown, New Jersey, United States	2001	Snood	used the label DSI Games; acquired by GreenScreen Interactive Software in 2008
Destineer	Minnesota, United States	2000		video game developer; publishes under the Bold Games, MacSoft, and Atomic Games labels
Devolver Digital	Austin, Texas, United States	2008		
Digital Chocolate	San Mateo, California, United States	2003	Army Attack	defunct 2014
Digital Fantasia	Blackpool, United Kingdom	1982	Perseus and Andromeda	ceased publishing in 1983; defunct 1991
Digital Integration	Camberley, Surrey, United Kingdom	1982	ATF	acquired by Titus Interactive in 1998; defunct 2005
Digital Jesters	Welwyn Garden City, Hertfordshire, England, United Kingdom	2003	Chaos League	defunct 2006
Digital Leisure	Aurora, Ontario, Canada	1997	various DVD games	
Digital Pictures	San Mateo, California, United States	1991	Corpse Killer	defunct 1996
Dinamic Multimedia	Madrid, Spain	1993	PC Fútbol	defunct 2001
Dinamic Software	Spain	1983	After the War	video game developer; defunct 1992
Dinosaur Polo Club	Wellington, New Zealand	2013	Mini Motorways	
Discis Knowledge Research	Toronto, Ontario, Canada	1988	Kids Basics	
Disney Interactive Studios	Glendale, California, United States	1988		defunct 2016
DK'Tronics	Saffron Walden, United Kingdom	1981	3D Tanx	defunct 1993
Domark	London, England, United Kingdom	1984	3D Construction Kit	merged with Big Red Software, Simis, and Eidos Technologies to form Eidos Interactive in 1996
Don't Nod	Paris, France	2008	Gerda: A Flame in Winter	
Double Fine	San Francisco, California, United States	2000	Psychonauts series	acquired by Microsoft in 2019
Dovetail Games	Chatham, Kent, England, United Kingdom	2008	Train Simulator	
Dragon Data	Wales, United Kingdom	1980	various Dragon 32/64 games	division of Mettoy; defunct 1984
DreadXP	United States	2019	The Mortuary Assistant	video game publishing arm of Dread Central
DreamCatcher Games	Toronto, Ontario, Canada	1996		acquired by JoWooD Productions; folded into Nordic Games in 2011
DreamWorks Interactive	Los Angeles, California, United States	1995	The Neverhood	joint venture between DreamWorks and Microsoft; acquired by Electronic Arts in 2000
Drecom	Shinagawa, Tokyo, Japan	2001	D Cide Traumerei, Disgaea RPG	
DROsoft	Madrid, Spain	1986	various ZX Spectrum games	acquired by Electronic Arts in 1994
Dtp entertainment	Hamburg, Germany	1995		
Dynamic Planning	Tokyo, Japan	1974	Shien's Revenge	known as Dynamic Kikaku; no longer publishes video games
Dynamix	Eugene, Oregon, United States	1984	David Wolf: Secret Agent	acquired by Sierra in 1990; defunct 2001
Eastasiasoft	Hong Kong, China	2007	Mugen Souls	
Edge Games	Pasadena, California, United States	1990		successor to Softek International Ltd
Edu-Ware	Agoura Hills, California, United States	1979	The Prisoner	defunct 1985
eGames	Langhorne, Pennsylvania, United States	1992	Darwinia	published games under the Cinemaware Marquee label; acquired by Tamino Minerals in 2012
Eidos Interactive	London, England, United Kingdom	1990	Tomb Raider series Hitman series Championship Manager series	absorbed by Square Enix Europe in 2009. Several assets including Crystal Dynamics, Eidos-Montreal, along with related franchises like Tomb Raider were acquired by Embracer Group in 2022
Electric Dreams Software	Southampton, England, United Kingdom	1985	Firetrack	defunct 1989
Electronic Arts	Redwood City, California, United States	1982	Battlefield series Medal of Honor series The Sims series The Need for Speed series	video game developer
Electronic Arts Square	Japan	1998		joint venture between Electronic Arts (70%) and Square (30%) to publish EA titles in Japan. Square's stake sold to EA in 2003 and became Electronic Arts K.K. during preparations for Square Enix merger
Electronic Arts Victor	Japan	1993	Mutant League Football	joint venture of Electronic Arts (70%) and Victor Entertainment (30%). Venture ended in December 1997
Electro Brain	Salt Lake City, Utah, United States	1990	Ghoul School	defunct 1998
The Elektrik Keyboard	Chicago, Illinois, United States	1978	Depth Charge	ceased publishing video games in 1979
ELF Corporation	Tokyo, Japan	1989	Dōkyūsei	defunct 2015
Elite Systems	Lichfield, United Kingdom	1984	Beyond the Ice Palace	
Empire Interactive	London, England, United Kingdom	1987	Big Mutha Truckers	defunct 2009
English Software	Manchester, United Kingdom	1982	Jet-Boot Jack	defunct 1987
Enix	Tokyo, Japan	1975	Dragon Warrior	merged with Square as Square Enix
Enlight Software	United States	1993	Restaurant Empire	
Enterbrain	Tokyo, Japan	1987	Tear Ring Saga	division of Kadokawa Corporation; its game business was merged into Kadokawa Games in 2009
Durell Software	Taunton, United Kingdom	1983	Saboteur	exited the video game industry in 1987
Eighting	Tokyo, Japan	1993	Battle Garegga	acquired by COLOPL in 2016 no longer self-publishes video games
Emerald Software	Waterford, Ireland	1988	various licensed games for the Commodore 64 and Amiga	defunct 1991
Encore, Inc.	Minneapolis, Minnesota, United States	1994	Torchlight	acquired by Speed Commerce in 2002, WYNIT Distribution LLC in 2014; encore acquired Viva Media
Entertainment Software Publishing	Japan	1997	Bangai-O	known as ESP; acquired by D3 Publisher, which continued to use it as a label until 2010
En Masse Entertainment	Seattle, Washington, United States	2010	TERA	subsidiary of Krafton Game Union; closed in 2020
Eolith	Seoul, South Korea	1996	various arcade games	defunct 2005
Eon Digital Entertainment	London, England, United Kingdom	2000	Airfix Dogfighter	defunct 2002
Epic Games	Potomac, Maryland, United States	1991	Epic Pinball; ZZT; Jill of the Jungle; Fortnite	video game developer; known as Potomac Computer Systems until 1992, and Epic MegaGames until 1999
Epoch Co.	Tokyo, Japan	1958	Barcode Battler	no longer publishes video games
Epyx	Chappaqua, New York, United States	1978	Dunjonquest series Crush, Crumble and Chomp! various Olympics-themed games	video game developer
ERE Informatique	France	1981	Macadam Bumper	acquired by Infogrames in 1987
ESA (formerly Softmax)	South Korea	1994	Magna Carta: The Phantom of Avalanche	left from game business
Europress	Bath, England, United Kingdom	1965	Titanic: Adventure Out of Time	acquired by Hasbro Interactive in 1999
Eushully	Sapporo, Japan	1998	various eroge	team within Arkham Products until 2005; label of Eukleia since then
Examu	Tokyo, Japan	1999	Arcana Heart	known as Yuki Enterprise until 2007
Exidy	Sunnyvale, California, United States	1974	Mouse Trap; Venture	defunct 1989
FASA	United States	1980		ended video game development and publishing 2012
Fandom	San Francisco, California, United States	2004		
Fairchild Semiconductor	Sunnyvale, California, United States	1957	various Fairchild Channel F games	initially a division of Fairchild Camera and Instrument; acquired by Schlumberger in 1979, then by National Semiconductor in 1987; regained independence in 1997; acquired by ON Semiconductor in 2016
Family Soft	Tokyo, Japan	1987	Asuka 120% Mad Stalker: Full Metal Force	
Fantasy Software	Cheltenham, United Kingdom	1983	various ZX Spectrum games	defunct 1985
Faster Than Light	United Kingdom	1986	Hydrofool	label of Gargoyle Games; defunct 1989
Fathammer	Finland	2002		acquired by Telcogames in 2006
Firebird Software	London, England, United Kingdom	1983	Elite	defunct 1989 upon MicroProse's acquisition of Telecomsoft
First Star Software	Chappaqua, New York, United States	1982	Boulder Dash	acquired by BBG Entertainment in 2018 and their games are now published by BBG Entertainment
Fellow Traveller Games	Melbourne, Australia	2013	Hacknet	
Feral Interactive	London, England, United Kingdom	1999		publishes Macintosh and Linux games
Fill-in-Cafe	Japan	1987		known as Team Cross Wonder until 1989; defunct 1998
Finji	Grand Rapids, Michigan, United States	2006	Night in the Woods; Overland; Wilmot's Warehouse; Chicory: A Colorful Tale; Tunic	
Fisher Price	East Aurora, New York, United States	1930	various Atari 8-bit and Colecovision games	acquired by Mattel in 1993 no longer publishes video games
Fishtank Interactive	Ravensburg, Germany	2000	AquaNox	publishing Label of Ravensburger Interactive; acquired alongside parent by JoWooD Productions in 2002
Flair Software	Newcastle upon Tyne, United Kingdom	1990	Elvira: The Arcade Game	last game published in 1999
Flight-Plan	Gifu, Japan	1989	Sacred Blaze	defunct 2010
Flying Edge	Glen Cove, New York, United States	1992	The Simpsons: Bart vs. the Space Mutants	label of Acclaim Entertainment; defunct 1994
Focus Entertainment	Paris, France	1996	Pro Cycling Manager	
Focus Multimedia	Rugeley, United Kingdom	1995	various budget CD-ROM games	Acquired by Fandom, Inc. in 2021
FormGen	Scottsdale, Arizona, United States	1987	Space Dude	acquired by GT Interactive in 1996
The Fourth Dimension	United Kingdom	1989	Apocalypse	known as The 4th Dimension or 4D; defunct 2004
Fox Interactive	Los Angeles, California, United States	1982	Croc; Die Hard Trilogy	video game developer; acquired by Vivendi Universal Games in 2003, ceased in 2006
Freeverse Software	New York City, United States	1994	Project Nomads	acquired by Ngmoco in 2010
French Bread	Tokyo, Japan	1998	Glove on Fight	formerly known as Watanabe Seisakusho
Froggo	Sunnyvale, California	1987	various Atari 2600 and 7800 games	defunct 1989
FromSoftware	Tokyo, Japan	1986	Dark Souls series	subsidiary of Kadokawa Corporation
Front Wing	Japan	2000	Tea Society of a Witch	
Frontier Developments	United Kingdoms	1994	Stranded: Alien Dawn; FAR: Changing Tides	publish games under the Frontier Foundry label, no longer publishes video game
FTL Games	San Diego, California, United States	1982	Dungeon Master	defunct 1996
Fujisankei Communications International	New York City, United States	1986		no longer publishes video games
Fujitsu	Tokyo, Japan	1935	various FM Towns games	no longer publishes video games
Full on Games	Tokyo, Japan	1996	various Dreamcast games	known as FOG
Funcom	Oslo, Norway	1993	Age of Conan	video game developer; acquired by Tencent in 2020
funk	Mainz, Germany	2016	Bundesfighter II Turbo	Online content network operated by German public broadcasting
Future Games	Beroun, Czech Republic	1996	The Black Mirror	defunct 2011
G.rev	Japan	2000	Border Down	
G5 Entertainment	Stockholm, Sweden	2001	Supermarket Mania	
Gaelco	Barcelona, Spain	1981	Big Karnak; World Rally	dissolved in 2007, acquired by Piko Interactive
Game Designers' Workshop	Normal, Illinois, United States	1973	The Battle of Chickamauga	defunct 1996
Gaijin Entertainment	Budapest, Hungary	2002	War Thunder	
Gaijinworks	Redding, California, United States	2006	Miami Law	
Gainax	Tokyo, Japan	1984	Princess Maker	no longer publishes video games
Gakken	Tokyo, Japan	1947	Might and Magic Book One: The Secret of the Inner Sanctum	no longer publishes video games
Game	Basingstoke, England, United Kingdom	1992	Christmas Shopper Simulator	
Gamecock	Austin, Texas, United States	2007		acquired by SouthPeak Games
Gameloft	Paris, France	2000	Asphalt Urban GT	Acquired by Vivendi in 2016
Game Freak	Tokyo, Japan	1989	Little Town Hero	
Games by Apollo	Richardson, Texas, United States	1981	Lost Luggage	defunct 1983
Games Workshop	Nottingham, United Kingdom	1975	Chaos	ceased publishing video games in 1985
GameHouse	Seattle, Washington, United States	1998		Acquired by RealNetworks in 2004
GameTek	North Miami Beach, Florida, United States	1987	Wheel of Fortune	publishing label of IJE; defunct 1998
Game Arts	Tokyo, Japan	1985	Thexder; Grandia; Silpheed	acquired by GungHo Online Entertainment in 2005 and their games are now published by GungHo Online Entertainment
The Game Factory	Aarhus, Denmark	2004	various licensed Game Boy Advance and Nintendo DS games	defunct
Game Park	South Korea	1996	various GP32 games	defunct 2007
Game Studio	Tokyo, Japan	1985		defunct 2015
Gargoyle Games	Dudley, England, United Kingdom	1983	Tir Na Nog	defunct 1987
Gathering of Developers	Austin, Texas, United States	1998	Jazz Jackrabbit 2	acquired by Take Two Interactive in 2000; renamed to Gathering; defunct 2004
Gearbox Software	Frisco, Texas, United States	1999	Bulletstorm: Full Clip Edition	acquired by Embracer Group in 2021, and later to 2K Games in 2024. Publishes game under the "Gearbox Publishing" label.
General Entertainment	Tokyo, Japan	1994		defunct 2011
Genki	Tokyo, Japan	1990	Tokyo Xtreme Racer	
Gathering of Developers	Texas, United States	1988	Tropico; Stronghold	acquired by Take-Two Interactive, name retired
Gebelli Software	United States	1982	Apple II games	defunct 1984
Giga	Japan	1993	Variable Geo	
Gizmondo	Sweden	2000	Sticky Balls	known as Tiger Telematics until 2004; defunct 2006
Global VR	San Jose, California, United States	1998	EA Sports NASCAR Racing	
GN Software	Japan	2003	Ren'ai CHU!	label of Good Navigate
GOG Ltd	Warsaw, Poland	2008		digital distribution service
Gogii Games	Moncton, New Brunswick, Canada	2006		video game developer
Good Shepherd Entertainment	The Hague, Netherlands	2011		
Gotham Games	New York City, United States	2002	Conflict: Desert Storm	label of Take-Two Interactive; defunct 2003
Gottlieb	Chicago, Illinois, United States	1927	Q*bert	defunct 1996
Got Game Entertainment	Weston, Connecticut, United States	2002	ARMA 2	
Grandslam Entertainment	Croydon, Surrey, United Kingdom	1987	Reunion	defunct 1995
Graphsim Entertainment	Addison, Texas	1992	Hellcats Over the Pacific	known as Graphic Simulations
Gravity	Seoul, Republic of Korea	2013	Ragnarok Online; Ragnarok Online 2: Legend of the Second	video game developer; subsidy of GungHo Online Entertainment
Great Wave Software	Scotts Valley, California, United States	1984	various edutainment games	defunct
Gremlin Industries	San Diego, California, United States	1973	Blockade	acquired by Bally in 1984
Gremlin Interactive	Sheffield, England, United Kingdom	1984		acquired by Atari, SA née Infogrames, name retired
Grolier Interactive Inc	New York City, United States	1982	Golden Gate Killer	known as Grolier Electronic Publishing Inc until 1996; acquired by Scholastic in 1999
Groove Games	Toronto, Ontario, Canada	2001	Pariah	defunct 2009
GSC World Publishing	Kyiv, Ukraine	2004		
GTE Interactive Media	Carlsbad, California, United States	1990	Titanic: Adventure Out of Time	software publishing arm of GTE; defunct 1997
GT Interactive	New York City, United States	1993	Blood	acquired by Atari, SA née Infogrames
GungHo Online Entertainment	Tokyo, Japan	1998	Ragnarok DS	
Gust Co. Ltd.	Nagano, Japan	1993		acquired by Koei Tecmo in 2011 and their games are now published by Koei Tecmo
Hacker International	Japan	1990	Menace Beach	defunct 2001
HAL Laboratory	Tokyo, Japan	1980	Eggerland	no longer publishes video games
Hamster Corporation	Tokyo, Japan	1999	Shienryu	
HanbitSoft	South Korea	1999	StarCraft (KR)	acquired by T3 Entertainment
Hasbro Interactive	California, United States	1995	Monopoly; RISK; RollerCoaster Tycoon series	assets acquired by Atari, SA née Infogrames in 2000, no staff retained
Headup Games	Düren, Germany	2009		Acquired by Thunderful Group in 2021
HeR Interactive	Bellevue, Washington, United States	1995	Nancy Drew	video game developer
Heureka-Klett	Germany	1996	Opera Fatal	defunct
Hex	London, England, United Kingdom	1990	Top Banana	defunct 1999
Hewson Consultants	United Kingdom	1981	Cybernoid: The Fighting Machine; Nebulus	defunct 1991
Hodder & Stoughton	London, England, United Kingdom	1868	The Rats	no longer publishes video games
Home Entertainment Suppliers	Sydney, Australia	1984	Raid 2020	known as HES
Hooded Horse	Dallas, Texas, United States	2019	Manor Lords	
HopeLab	Redwood City, California, United States	2001	Re-Mission	
Houghton Mifflin Harcourt	Boston, Massachusetts, United States	1832	Where in the World is Carmen Sandiego? Treasures of Knowledge	publishes games through its software division, Houghton Mifflin Harcourt Learning Technology, which was known as Riverdeep PLC until its acquisition of Houghton Mifflin in 2006, and then as Houghton Mifflin Riverdeep Group until 2007
Hudson Soft	Minato, Tokyo, Japan	1973	Bomberman; Bonk; Adventure Island	video game developer; acquired by Konami
Human Engineered Software	Brisbane, California, United States	1980	Project Space Station	acquired by Avant Garde Publishing Corp. in 1984
Human Entertainment	Tokyo, Japan	1983	Fire Pro Wrestling	defunct 2000
Humble Bundle	San Francisco, California, United States	2010	A Hat in Time	acquired by IGN Entertainment
HummingBirdSoft	Japan	1982	Laplace no Ma	defunct
Humongous Entertainment	City of Industry, California, United States	1992	Putt-Putt	Ceased self-publication in 2000, shuttered in 2006
IBM	Armonk, New York, United States	1911	Alley Cat	
Iceberg Interactive	Haarlem, The Netherlands	2009	Killing Floor; APB: Reloaded; Endless Space; StarDrive	
ICOM Simulations	Wheeling, Illinois, United States	1981	Sherlock Holmes: Consulting Detective	acquired by Viacom New Media in 1993, reformed as Rabid Entertainment in 1997, and closed in 1998
Idea Factory	Tokyo, Japan	1994	Black Stone: Magic & Steel	
id Software	Richardson, Texas, United States	1991	Heretic	acquired by ZeniMax Media in 2009
Ignition Entertainment	Essex, England, United Kingdom	2002		acquired by UTV Software Communications and renamed UTV Ignition Games. Shuttered in 2012 following purchase of UTV by The Walt Disney Company.
Illusion Soft	Yokohama, Japan	2001	RapeLay	defunct in 2023
Imageepoch	Tokyo, Japan	2005	Black Rock Shooter: The Game	defunct 2015
Image Works	United Kingdom	1988	Bloodwych	label of Mirrorsoft; last game published in 1991
Imagic	California, United States	1981	various Atari 2600 games various early consoles games	video game developer
Imagine Software	Liverpool, England, United Kingdom	1982	Arcadia, Alchemist	defunct 1984; rights bought by Ocean Software, which continued to use the Imagine name as a label on some games
Impressions Games	Cambridge, Massachusetts, United States	1989	Global Domination	acquired by Sierra in 1995; defunct 2004
Incentive Software	Reading, Berkshire, United Kingdom	1983	Driller	reformed as Superscape in 1992
Incredible Technologies	Vernon Hills, Illinois, United States	1985	Golden Tee Golf	
indiePub Entertainment	Cincinnati, Ohio, United States	2008		
Infocom	Cambridge, Massachusetts, United States	1979	Zork series	acquired by Activision, name retired
Infogrames	Lyon, France	1983		(Renamed Atari, SA)
Innerprise Software	Hunt Valley, Maryland, United States	1989	Battle Squadron	defunct 1992
Innova	Moscow, Russia	2006	Blade & Soul	
Inscape	Los Angeles, United States	1994	Bad Day on the Midway; Drowned God	acquired by Graphix Zone in early 1997, which ceased operations in November 1997
Intellivision Entertainment	United States	1997	Intellivision Lives!	
Interactive Magic	Cary, North Carolina, United States	1994	Capitalism	changed name to iEntertainment Network in 1999
Interceptor Micros	Tadley, United Kingdom	1982	The Heroes of Karn	video game developer; defunct 1992
Interchannel	Tokyo, Japan	1995	Puyo Puyo 2	subsidiary of NEC until 2004 no longer publishes video games
Interplay Entertainment	Beverly Hills, California, United States	1983	Fallout; Descent	video game developer; acquired by Titus Interactive, closed and reopened as an independent publisher
Introversion Software	Walton-on-Thames, United Kingdom	2001	Uplink	
INTV Corporation	United States	1984	various Intellivision games	defunct 1990
inXile Entertainment	Newport Beach, California, United States	2002		video game developer; acquired by Microsoft in 2018
iQue	Suzhou, China	2002	various iQue games	joint venture between Wei Yen and Nintendo
Irem	Tokyo, Japan	1997	R-Type	video game developer; dissolved video game subsidiary in 2011
ITE Media	Copenhagen, Denmark	1998	Hugo	software publishing arm of Interactive Television Entertainment; acquired by NDS Group in 2006; defunct 2010
Jaleco	Japan	1974	Bases Loaded; City Connection; P-47: The Phantom Fighter; Rod Land	video game developer, defunct 2014 and acquired by the company, City Connection
JAST USA	San Diego, California, United States	1996	Season of the Sakura	
Jester Interactive	Wales, United Kingdom	1997	Suzuki TT Superbikes	
Johnson & Johnson	New Brunswick, New Jersey, United States	1886	Tooth Protectors	no longer publishes video games
JoWooD Productions	Liezen, Austria	1995		folded into Nordic Games in 2011
JumpStart Games (formerly Knowledge Adventure)	Los Angeles, California, United States	1989	Undersea Adventure	acquired by NetDragon Websoft
K2 Network (Gamersfirst)	Irvine, California, United States	2001	War Rock; Sword 2 APB: Reloaded; Knight Online; Fallen Earth	merged with Reloaded Games; reloaded Games no longer publishes games, and their publishing title is now published by GamersFirst.
Kadokawa Games	Fujimi, Chiyoda, Tokyo, Japan	1945	Sora no Otoshimono Forte: Dreamy Season	
Kakao Games	Jeju City, South Korea	2010	Guardian Tales	video game publishing arm of Kakao
Kalisto Entertainment	Bordeaux, France	1990	S.C.OUT	label of Atreid Concept until 1996, when it became the name of the company as a whole; defunct 2002
Kalypso Media	Worms, Germany	2006	Imperium Romanum	
Kaneko	Tokyo, Japan	1980	Air Buster; DJ Boy	
Kaypro	San Diego, California, United States	1981	Ladder	defunct 1992; reëstablished in 1999; defunct again in 2001
Kee Games	California, United States	1973	Tank	defunct 1978
Kemco	Japan	1984	Top Gear	video game developer
Ketchapp	Paris, France	2014	2048	acquired by Ubisoft in 2016
Kepler Interactive	United Kingdoms	2021	Tchia, Scorn	video game developer
King Games	Miami, Florida	2006	Sneak King	label of Burger King used for a 2006 advergame promotion
KID	Tokyo, Japan	1988	Infinity Cure	defunct 2006
Kingsoft	Aachen, Germany	1983		acquired by Electronic Arts in 1983; defunct 2000
King Records	Tokyo, Japan	1931	Jesus: Kyōfu no Bio Monster	no longer publishes video games
Koch Media	Germany	1994	Dead Island	bought by THQ Nordic February 2018
Kodansha	Tokyo, Japan	1938	Blue Almanac	no longer publishes video games
Koei	Ashikaga, Tochigi, Japan	1976	Dynasty Warriors	video game developer; merged into Tecmo Koei
Koei Tecmo	Japan	2009		changed name from Tecmo Koei in 2014
Kogado Studio	Tokyo, Japan	1916	Cosmic Soldier	
Konami	Tokyo, Japan	1969	Castlevania; Metal Gear; Contra; International Superstar Soccer; Silent Hill; Gradius; Pro Evolution Soccer	
Kongregate	United States	2006		
Krisalis Software	Rotherham, England, United Kingdom	1987	Soccer Kid	defunct 2001
KSS	Japan	1990	Majyūō	exited the video game industry in 2001
Kure Software Koubou	Japan	1985		known as KSK
Kuro Games	Guangzhou, China	2017	Punishing: Gray Raven	
Lankhor	Paris, France	1987	Mortville Manor	defunct 2001
Le Lombard	Belgium	1946	Thorgal: Curse of Atlantis	no longer publishes video games
Kwalee	Leamington Spa, England, United Kingdom	2011		
Legacy Interactive	Hollywood, California, United States	1998		video game developer
Legendo Entertainment	Gothenburg, Sweden	1998	Pure Pinball	known as Iridon Interactive until 2005
Legend Entertainment	Chantilly, Virginia, United States	1989	Spellcasting	acquired by GT Interactive in 1998; defunct 2004
Lego Interactive	London, England, United Kingdom	1996	Lego Loco	publishing arm of Lego Group; known as Lego Media until 2000, and Lego Software until 2002; defunct 2005
Leland Corporation	El Cajon, California, United States	1987	Dragon's Lair II: Time Warp	renamed to Leland Interactive Media in 1993; acquired by WMS Industries in 1994
Level-5	Fukuoka, Japan	1998	Yo-kai Watch	
Level 9 Computing	United Kingdom	1981	Jewels of Darkness	defunct 1991
Limited Run Games	Raleigh, North Carolina, United States	2015	Dust: An Elysian Tail	acquired by Embracer Group in 2022
Linux Game Publishing	Nottingham, England, United Kingdom	2001		inactive
Lighthouse Interactive	Haarlem, The Netherlands	2005	LocoMania	acquired by SilverBirch Inc. in 2008; defunct 2009
LJN	New York City, United States	1970		acquired by Acclaim Entertainment
LK Avalon	Świlcza, Poland	1989	Hans Kloss	
Llamasoft	Wales, United Kingdom	1981	Attack of the Mutant Camels	
Lock 'n Load Publishing	Pueblo, Colorado, United States	2006		
Logotron Ltd	Cambridge, England, United Kingdom	1987	XOR	published last game in 1990
Loki Software	Tustin, California, United States	1998		
Loriciel	France	1983	Jim Power in Mutant Planet	defunct 1995
LucasArts	San Francisco, California, United States	1982	Monkey Island; Maniac Mansion; Indiana Jones; Star Wars	acquired by The Walt Disney Company (originally Lucasfilm Games LLC) and they changed from publisher to licensor
Lump of Sugar	Japan	2005	Nursery Rhyme	
MacPlay	Dallas, Texas, United States	1993	various Macintosh games	label of Interplay until 1997; revived in 2000 as a label of United Developers
MacSoft	Plymouth, Minnesota, United States	1993	various Macintosh games	acquired by Destineer in 2003
Mad Catz	San Diego, California, United States	1989	MC Groovz Dance Craze	defunct 2017
Magical Company	Kobe, Japan	1985	Kōshien	no longer publishes video games
Magic Bytes	Gütersloh, Germany	1987	Wall$treet	Game publishing arm of Micro-Partner Software GmbH
Mages (formerly 5pb.)	Tokyo, Japan	2005	Memories Off	Acquired by Colopl in 2020
Magnavox	Napa, California, United States	1911	Magnavox Odyssey	video game developer; acquired by Philips in 1974; exited the video game industry in 1984
Mr Chip Software	Chester, United Kingdom	1982	various Commodore 64 games	ceased publishing video games in 1984; changed name to Magnetic Fields in 1988
magnussoft	Kesselsdorf, Germany	1984		
Mandarin Software	Adlington, United Kingdom	1988	Lancelot	publishing label of Europress Software; last game published in 1990
MangaGamer	Japan	2009	various visual novels	
Martech	Pevensey Bay, United Kingdom	1982	Rex	ceased publishing video games in 1989
Majesco	Edison, New Jersey, United States	1986	Cooking Mama	exited the video game industry in 2016
Marvelous	Tokyo, Japan	2011		video game developer
Marvelous Entertainment	Tokyo, Japan	1997	Harvest Moon DS	merged with AQ Interactive in 2011 to become Marvelous AQL (later Marvelous)
Mastertronic	United Kingdom	1983	One Man and His Droid, Master of Magic	merged with Virgin Interactive in 1988, and subsequently absorbed into Sega in 1991
Mastertronic Group	Huntingdon, United Kingdom	2004	The Charnel House Trilogy	defunct 2015
Mastiff	San Francisco, California	2002		video game developer
Matrix Games	Staten Island, New York, United States	2000	Distant Worlds	merged into Slitherine Software in 2010 and their games are published by Slitherine
Mattel	El Segundo, California, United States	1945	Astrosmash	exited the video game business in 1984
Mattel163	Walnut Creek, California, United States; Hong Kong, China	2017		joint venture of Mattel and NetEase
Maximum Games	Walnut Creek, California, United States	2009	Deer Drive Legends; JASF: Jane's Advanced Strike Fighters; Worms Collection	formerly Maximum Family Games; acquired by Zordix AB, which has the Zordix Publishing label, in 2021
Maxis	Emeryville, California, United States	1987	SimCity series The Sims series Spore	acquired by Electronic Arts and is now its development division; their games are now published by Electronic Arts or EA Mobile
Max Design	Schladming, Austria	1991	1869	defunct 2004
McDonald's	Chicago, United States	1940	Grimace's Birthday	
MC Lothlorien	United Kingdom	1982	Micro Mouse Goes Debugging	defunct 1990
MECC	Brooklyn Center, Minnesota, United States	1973	The Oregon Trail	defunct 1999
Med Systems Software	Chapel Hill, North Carolina, United States	1980	Asylum	acquired by Screenplay in 1983; defunct 1984
MediaWorks	Tokyo, Japan	1992	Emerald Dragon	merged with ASCII Corporation in 2008 to become ASCII MediaWorks; in 2009, its game business was merged into Kadokawa Games
Media Factory	Tokyo, Japan	1986	Derby Stallion 64	label of Recruit until 2011, and of Kadokawa Corporation since then; no longer publishes video games
Media Rings	Tokyo, Japan	1989	Zero4 Champ	defunct 2007
Mega Enterprise	Seoul, South Korea	1998	Call of Duty	defunct 2007
Megatech Software	California, United States	1992	Knights of Xentar	defunct 1997 or 1999
Melbourne House	Melbourne, Australia	1977	Way of the Exploding Fist	acquired by Krome Studios in 2006; closed in 2010
Meldac	Japan	1990	Zombie Nation	no longer publishes video games
Metro3D, Inc.	San Jose, California, United States	1998	Dual Blades	defunct 2004
Metropolis Software	Warsaw, Poland	1992	Teenagent	acquired by CD Projekt in 2008; defunct 2009
MGM Interactive	United States	1995	Machine Hunter	software publishing arm of Metro-Goldwyn-Mayer; defunct 2005
Microdeal	St Austell, Cornwall, England, United Kingdom	1981	Goldrunner	rights sold to HiSoft Systems in 1989
Microforum International	Canada	1985	Armored Moon: The Next Eden	
Microids	France	1984	Blacksad: Under the Skin	video game developer; subsidiary of Média-Participations
MicroIllusions	Granada Hills, California, United States	1987	The Faery Tale Adventure	last game published in 1989
MicroProse	Hunt Valley, Maryland, United States	1982	X-Com	acquired by Hasbro Interactive, name retired
Microsoft	Redmond, Washington, United States	1975	Halo series Age of Empires series Gears of War series Forza series Fable series Black & White	publishes games under the Xbox Game Studios banner since 2019; owns publisher Bethesda Softworks and Activision Blizzard
Microsphere	London, England, United Kingdom	1982	Skool Daze	defunct 1987
Microcabin	Japan	1982	Xak: The Art of Visual Stage	acquired by AQ Interactive in 2008, and by Fields Corporation in 2011
Micrografx	Richardson, Texas, United States	1982		acquired by Corel in 2001
Micro Genius	Taipei, Taiwan	1989		defunct 1994
Micro Power	Leeds, England, United Kingdom	1980	Castle Quest	defunct 1987
Midway Games	Chicago, Illinois, United States	1988	Mortal Kombat	video game developer; assets acquired by Warner Bros. Interactive and THQ
Midway Manufacturing	Chicago, Illinois, United States	1958	Spy Hunter	video game developer; acquired by Bally in 1969; Bally/Midway was in turn acquired by Williams Electronics in 1987; reformed as Midway Games in 1988
Mikro-Gen	Bracknell, United Kingdom	1981	Pyjamarama	acquired by Creative Sparks Distribution in 1987
MileStone Inc.	Tokyo, Japan	2003	Chaos Field	closed in 2013
Millennium Interactive	Cambridge, England, United Kingdom	1988	Cloud Kingdoms	acquired by Sony Interactive Entertainment in 1997
Milton Bradley Company	East Longmeadow, Massachusetts, United States	1860	Time Lord	acquired by Hasbro in 1984; defunct 2009
Mindcraft	Torrance, California, United States	1989	The Magic Candle	last game published in 1993
Mindscape	Novato, California, United States	1980		no longer publishes video games
Minori	Japan	2001	Bittersweet Fools	software division of CoMixWave until 2007
Mirrorsoft	London, England, United Kingdom	1982	Tetris (Home computers)	acquired by Acclaim Entertainment in 1992
Mitchell Corporation	Tokyo, Japan	1960	Pang	defunct 2012
Mode 7 Games	East Sussex, England	2005	Frozen Synapse series Tokyo 42	
Modus Games	Walnut Creek, California, United States	2018	Extinction	indie publishing label of Maximum Games
Mojang Studios	Stockholm, Sweden	2009	Minecraft	acquired by Microsoft in 2014
monochrom	Vienna, Austria	1993	Soviet Unterzoegersdorf	
Monolith Productions	Kirkland, Washington, United States	1994	Get Medieval	acquired by Warner Bros. in 2004
Monte Cristo	Paris, France	1995	Cities XL	defunct 2010
Moonstone	Japan	2003	Gift	publishes under the Moonstone Cherry label
MOSS	Tokyo, Japan	1993	Caladrius	
Motown Games	United States	1994	Rap Jam: Volume One	software publishing arm of Motown; defunct 1996
Mountain King Studios	Chicago, Illinois, United States	1992	DemonStar	no longer publishes video games
MTO	Yokohama, Japan	1996	GT Pro Series	
MTV Games	New York City, United States	2006	Rock Band	
Mud Duck Productions	Rockville, Maryland, United States	2002	Malice	label of ZeniMax Media; defunct 2007
Muse Software	Monrovia, Maryland, United States	1978		video game developer
MumboJumbo	Dallas, Texas, United States	2001	7 Wonders of the Ancient World	
Mystique	United States	1982	Custer's Revenge	offshoot of Caballero Control Corporation and American Multiple Industries; defunct 1983
Nacon (formerly Bigben Interactive SA)	Lesquin, France	1981		
Namco	Tokyo, Japan	1955	Tekken; Pac-Man; Ace Combat; Time Crisis; Ridge Racer	no longer publishes video games; video game division merged with Bandai's video game operations as Namco Bandai Games (then Bandai Namco Entertainment)
National Aeronautics & Space Administration	Washington, D.C., United States	1958	Moonbase Alpha	
Natsume Atari	Tokyo, Japan	1987	Abadox	originally known as Natsume Co., Ltd. until merger with subsidiary Atari in 2013
Natsume Inc.	Burlingame, California	1988	Harvest Moon	originally a division of Natsume Co., Ltd. (currently Natsume Atari) until 1995
Navel	Japan	2003	Shuffle!	label of Omega Vision, Inc
Naxat Soft	Tokyo, Japan	1988	Recca	defunct 2015
NBCUniversal	Midtown Manhattan, New York City	2004		the game publishing division will be closed in 2019
NCsoft	Seoul, South Korea	1997	Lineage; Guild Wars series	
NEC Corporation	Tokyo, Japan	1899	Keith Courage in Alpha Zones	
Neko Entertainment	Montreuil, France	1999	Super Army War	defunct 2017
Netbabyworld	Gothenburg, Sweden	1999		defunct 2003
Netdragon	Fuzhou, China	1997		video game developer
NetEase	Guangzhou, China	1997	Fantasy Westward Journey	video game developer and online services company
New Blood Interactive		2014	Ultrakill	
New Generation Software	United Kingdom	1982	Trashman	defunct 1986
Newgrounds	Glenside, Pennsylvania, United States	1995	Nightmare Cops	company and entertainment website
Netflix	Los Gatos, California, United States	1998	Unhinged	
NewKidCo	Manhattan, New York, United States	1998	E.T.: Interplanetary Mission	defunct 2005
New World Computing	Agoura Hills, California, United States	1984	Might and Magic; Heroes of Might and Magic	video game developer; purchased by 3DO, now folded into Ubisoft
The New York Times Company	New York City, United States	1851	Wordle	Acquired Wordle from independent developer Josh Wardle on 31 January 2022
Nexon	Seoul, South Korea	1994	Maplestory	video game developer
Nichibutsu	Japan	1970	Crazy Climber; Moon Cresta; Terra Cresta	defunct 2015; acquired by Hamster Corporation in 2014
Nihon Falcom	Japan	1981	Dragon Slayer	
Nintendo	Kyoto, Japan	1889	Mario; The Legend of Zelda; Metroid; Pokémon; Pikmin; Kirby; Animal Crossing	video game developer
Nippon Ichi Software	Japan	1994	Disgaea series	video game developer
Nitroplus	Tokyo, Japan	2000	Phantom of Inferno	
Novagen Software	Birmingham, England, United Kingdom	1983	Mercenary	defunct 1992
Nokia	Espoo, Finland	1865		
No More Robots	Manchester, United Kingdom	2017	Descenders	
Nordcurrent	Vilnius, Lithuania	2002	Minon: Everyday Hero	
NovaLogic	Calabasas, California, United States	1985	Comanche	acquired by THQ Nordic in 2016
NTDEC	Taipei, Taiwan	1983	various unlicensed Famicom games	defunct 1993
Nutting Associates	Mountain View, California, United States	1965	Computer Space	defunct 1976
Ocean Software	Manchester, United Kingdom	1984	various licensed Commodore 64 and Amiga games	acquired by Infogrames
Ocean State Publishing	Woonsocket, Rhode Island, United States	1990		label of Rhode Island Soft Systems; acquired by Freeze.com in 2003
Oculus Studios	Irvine, California, United States	2014	Asgard's Wrath	game publishing arm of Oculus VR
Odin Computer Graphics	Liverpool, England, United Kingdom	1985	Nodes of Yesod	defunct 1988, re-established in 2005
Ongakukan	Kawasaki City, Japan	1985	Railfan	
Opera Soft	Spain	1986	The Last Mission	defunct 1992
Origin Systems	Austin, Texas, United States	1983	Ultima series Wing Commander series	video game developer; acquired by Electronic Arts
Orion Interactive	United States	1996		defunct following acquisition by Metro-Goldwyn-Mayer in 1997
Out of the Park Developments	Hollern-Twielenfleth, Germany	1999	Out of the Park Baseball	Acquired by Com2uS in 2020
Overflow	Tokyo, Japan	1997	School Days	
OziSoft	Sydney, Australia	1982	A Journey to the Centre of the Earth	Distributor of video games in Australia and New Zealand. Was owned by Sega during the 1990s before being purchased by Infogrames in 1999 and rebranded under their name in 2002. Now part of Bandai Namco Entertainment
Pacific Novelty	United States	1980	The Amazing Adventures of Mr. F. Lea	last game published in 1983
Pack-In-Video	Japan	1970	Harvest Moon (Japanese release)	acquired by Victor Entertainment in 1996; became Victor Interactive Software
Palace Software	London, England, United Kingdom	1983	Barbarian: The Ultimate Warrior Cauldron	acquired by Titus Software in 1991
Palette	Tokyo, Japan	2002	Mashiroiro Symphony	
Panasonic	Osaka, Japan	1918	D	no longer publishes video games
Panesian Taiwan	Taiwan	1990	AV-Pachi Slot; Bubble Bath Babes; Peek-A-Boo Poker	publisher of eroge for the Family Computer and NES
Panther Games	Canberra, Australia	1985	Fire-Brigade: The Battle for Kiev - 1943	no longer publishes video games; their games are now published by Lock 'n Load Publishing
Paradox Interactive	Stockholm, Sweden	1998		video game developer
Paragon Software	Greensburg, Pennsylvania, United States	1985	The Amazing Spider-Man	defunct 1992
Parker Brothers	Beverly, Massachusetts, United States	1883	Montezuma's Revenge	acquired by Hasbro in 1991, which continued to use it as a label on some video games until 1994
Pathea Games	Chongqing, China	2010	Planet Explorers	
Penguin Software	Geneva, Illinois, United States	1978		acquired by Merit Software in 1988
Pentavision	South Korea	2003	DJMax Portable	division of Neowiz Games; merged with GameOn Studios in 2012
Perfect World	Beijing, China	2004	Perfect World; Jade Dynasty	video game developer; subsidiaries formerly include Arc Games, Runic Games and Cryptic Studios
Personal Software Services	Coventry, United Kingdom	1981	Battle for Midway	acquired by Mirrorsoft in 1987
Petroglyph Games	Las Vegas, Nevada, United States	2003	Guardians of Graxia; Mytheon; Panzer General: Russian Assault	video game developer
PF.Magic	San Francisco, California, United States	1991	Petz	acquired by Ubisoft in 1998
Phantagram	South Korea	1994	Phantom Crash	
Philips	Amsterdam, Netherlands	1891	various CD-i games	no longer publishes video games
Piranha Bytes	Essen, Germany	1997	Gothic series Risen series ELEX	video game developer
Piranha Interactive Publishing	Tempe, Arizona, United States	1995	Morpheus	defunct 1999
Piranha Software	London, England, United Kingdom	1986	The Trap Door	software publishing arm of Macmillan Publishers Ltd; defunct since 1988
PikPok	Wellington, New Zealand	1997		
PlayFirst	San Francisco, California, United States	2004	Diner Dash	acquired by Glu mobile in 2014
Playlogic Entertainment, Inc.	The Netherlands, Amsterdam	2002		
Playmates Toys	Costa Mesa, California, United States	1966	Earthworm Jim (SNES)	
Plug in Digital	Montpellier, France	2012	The Forgotten City	
The Pokémon Company	Tokyo, Japan	1998	Pokémon	joint venture between Game Freak, Nintendo, and Creatures. Publishes Pokémon titles in Japan and on mobile platforms
Polyhedra Games	Brooklyn, New York, United States	2019	Headcannon	
Pony Canyon	Tokyo, Japan	1966	Dr. Chaos	no longer publishes video games
PopCap Games	Seattle, Washington, United States	2000	Bejeweled; Plants vs. Zombies; Peggle; Zuma	video game developer; now owned by Electronic Arts
Portkey Games	England, United Kingdom	2017	Harry Potter: Wizards Unite; Harry Potter: Hogwarts Mystery; Hogwarts Legacy	label of Warner Bros. Interactive Entertainment; focused on publishing games related to the Wizarding World franchise
Positech Games	United Kingdom	1997		
Presto Studios	Encinitas, California, United States	1991	The Journeyman Project	defunct 2002
PrincessSoft	Japan	2001		publishing label of Oaks Co., Ltd
Prism Leisure Corporation	Enfield, Middlesex, England, United Kingdom	1984	various ZX Spectrum games	published under the Addictive Games, Endurance Games, and Paxman Promotions labels; defunct
Private Division	New York City, New York, United States	2017	Kerbal Space Program	label of Take-Two Interactive
Probe Software	Croydon, England, United Kingdom	1984	Mantronix	acquired by Acclaim Entertainment in 1999; defunct 2004
Programma International	Los Angeles, California, United States	1978	3-D Docking Mission	defunct 1983
Prototype	Tokyo, Japan	2006	Planetarian: The Reverie of a Little Planet	
Psygnosis	Liverpool, England, United Kingdom	1984	Discworld; Lemmings	video game developer
Psikyo	Kyoto, Japan	1992	Sengoku Blade	defunct 2003; continued to be used a label until 2005
Psytronik Software	United Kingdom	1993	Knight 'n' Grail	
Pulltop	Japan	2002		
Purple Moon	Mountain View, California, United States	1997	various girls' video games	acquired by Mattel in 1999
Quality Software	Chatsworth, California, United States	1978	The Return of Heracles	defunct 1984
Quantum Quality Productions	Flemington, New Jersey, United States	1991	The Perfect General	acquired by American Laser Games in 1994; defunct 1995
Quest Corporation	Tokyo, Japan	1988	Ogre Battle: The March of the Black Queen	defunct 2002 following acquisition by Square
Quicksilva	United Kingdom	1983	Ant Attack, Bugaboo (The Flea)	acquired by Argus Press Software in 1984, which used the Quicksilva name as a label until 1989
QuinRose	Japan	2005	Arabians Lost: The Engagement on Desert	
Quintet	Tokyo, Japan	1987		defunct 2002
Q Entertainment	Tokyo, Japan	2003	Lumines II	
R2Games	Hong Kong, China	2010		
Rabbit Software	London, England, United Kingdom	1982	Potty Painter	acquired by Virgin Games in 1985
Radica Games	United States	1983	20Q	acquired by Mattel in 2006
Rage Software	Liverpool, England, United Kingdom	1992	Striker	defunct 2003
Rainbird Software	London, England, United Kingdom	1986	Starglider	label of Telecomsoft until 1989, and of MicroProse from then until its discontinuation in 1991
Rainbow Arts	Gütersloh, Germany	1984	Turrican, The Great Giana Sisters	video game developer; acquired by Funsoft and subsequently absorbed into THQ in 1999
Random House	New York City, United States	1927	APBA Major League Players Baseball	no longer publishes video games
Rare	Twycross, England, United Kingdom	1985	Jet Force Gemini; Banjo-Kazooie series Sea of Thieves	acquired by Microsoft in 2002, no longer publishes video games
Ravensburger Interactive	Ravensburg, Germany	1883		video game subsidiary of Ravensburger AG; acquired by JoWooD Productions in 2002
Raw Fury	Stockholm, Sweden	2015	Kingdom, Gonner	
Raw Thrills	Skokie, Illinois, United States	2001	Target: Terror	
Red Ant Enterprises	Australia	2001		local distributor for other publishers' games; defunct 2011
Red Entertainment	Tokyo, Japan	1976	Gungrave	known as Red Company until 2000
RedOctane	Mountain View, California, United States	1999	Guitar Hero	acquired by Activision in 2006; defunct 2010, revived 2025
Red Orb Entertainment	Novato, California, United States	1997	Riven	label of Broderbund, and of Mindscape from 1998 onward; defunct 2001 following acquisition by Ubisoft
Red Rat Software	Manchester, England, United Kingdom	1985	Crumble's Crisis	defunct 1993
Red Shift	London, England	1983	Rebelstar Raiders	defunct 1985
Red Storm Entertainment	Cary, North Carolina, United States	1996	Rainbow Six	video game developer; acquired by Ubisoft
Regista	Japan	2004	I/O	
reLINE Software	Hanover, Germany	1987	Amegas	defunct 2004
Renegade Software	Wapping, London, England, United Kingdom	1991	Gods, Fire & Ice	publishing arm of The Bitmap Brothers; acquired by GT Interactive in 1997
Renovation Products	United States	1990		acquired by Sega
Richard Shepherd Software	Slough, Berkshire, England, United Kingdom	1982	Shaken but not Stirred	defunct 1984
Right Stuff	Tokyo, Japan	1990	Flash Hiders	defunct 1999
Riot Games	Santa Monica, United States	2006	League of Legends	video game developer; acquired by Tencent. Published games under the Riot Forge label from 2019 to 2024.
Ripcord Games	Santa Clara, California, United States	1996	Postal	label of Panasonic Interactive Media until 1999; ceased publishing video games in 2001; defunct 2009
Rising Star Games	Hitchin, England, United Kingdom	2004		Acquired by Thunderful Group in 2018
Riverhillsoft	Japan	1982	J.B. Harold Murder Club	defunct 2004
Rock-Ola	Chicago, Illinois, United States	1927	Nibbler	no longer publishes video games
Rockstar Games	New York, New York, United States	1998	Max Payne; Grand Theft Auto series Red Dead series Manhunt; Midnight Club; Bully	video game developer; currently a publishing label of Take-Two Interactive
Romstar	Torrance, California, United States	1984	Twin Cobra	defunct 1992
Romtech	Langhorne, Pennsylvania, United States	1999		defunct
Rovio Entertainment	Espoo, Finland	2003	Angry Birds	publishers its own developed games as well as 3rd parties under Rovio Stars. Acquired by Sega in 2023
RTL Group	Kirchberg, Luxembourg	1920	Crash Time: Autobahn Pursuit	published under the RTL Playtainment label; currently its subsidiary, BroadbandTV, publishes some mobile games
Saga Planets	Osaka, Japan	1998	Ren'ai CHU!	
Sammy Studios	Minato, Japan	2004		merged with Sega as Sega Sammy Holdings,
Samsung	Seoul, South Korea	1938	various Sega Mega Drive games in Korea	no longer publishes video games
Sanctuary Woods	Victoria, British Columbia, Canada	1988	Ripley's Believe It or Not!: The Riddle of Master Lu	defunct 2001
Scavenger, Inc.	Los Angeles, California, United States	1996	Scorcher	defunct 1998
Scopely	Culver City, California, United States	2011	Star Trek Fleet Command; The Walking Dead: Road to Survival	
SCi Games	London, England, United Kingdom	1988		bought and merged with Eidos Interactive in 2005; name retired
SCS Software	Prague, Czech Republic	1997	Euro Truck Simulator 2	
Scholastic	Wilkinsburg, Pennsylvania, United States	1920		ceased publishing video games in 2007
Sears	Chicago, Illinois, United States	1886	various Atari 2600 games	published under the Tele-Games label; exited the video game industry in 1983
Sega	Tokyo, Japan	1960	Sonic the Hedgehog series Phantasy Star series Virtua Fighter series	video game developer; merged with Sammy Studios as Sega Sammy Holdings
Seibu Kaihatsu	Tokyo, Japan	1982	Raiden	ceased publishing video games in 1998
Serenity Forge	Boulder, Colorado, United States	2014	Doki Doki Literature Club Plus! Neversong; Where the Water Tastes Like Wine	video game developer
SETA Corporation	Tokyo, Japan	1985		defunct 2009
Seven45 Studios	Seattle, Washington, United States	2007	Power Gig: Rise of the SixString	game publishing arm of First Act which was acquired by Jazwares in 2016
SFB Games	London, England, United Kingdom	2002	Crow Country	
Shanda	Shanghai, China	1999		gaming unit spun off as Shanda Games (later Shengqu Games) in 2009
Sharp Corporation	Sakai, Japan	1912	Nekketsu High School Dodgeball Club: Soccer	no longer publishes video games
Shengqu Games	Shanghai, China	1999		
Sherston Software	Sherston, Wiltshire, United Kingdom	1983	various BBC Micro games	defunct 2011; now a label of Sherston Publishing Group
Shoeisha	Tokyo, Japan	1986	BreakThru!	no longer publishes video games
Shogakukan	Tokyo, Japan	1922	Professor Kageyama's Maths Training: The Hundred Cell Calculation Method	
Sierra Entertainment	California, United States	1979	Gabriel Knight; King's Quest; Leisure Suit Larry; Half-Life; Police Quest; Quest for Glory; Space Quest	video game developer; defunct 2008; name was revived as an Activision brand in 2014
Silicon Beach Software	San Diego, California, United States	1984	Enchanted Scepters	acquired by Aldus Corporation in 1990
Silmarils	Lognes, Paris, France	1987	Metal Mutant	defunct 2003
Simon & Schuster Interactive	New York City, United States	1995	Deer Avenger	defunct 2003
SIMS Co., Ltd.	Tokyo, Japan	1991	Vay	
Simulations Canada	Canada	1977	various computer wargames	no longer publishes video games
Sinclair Research Ltd.	London, England, United Kingdom	1973	1K ZX Chess	brand name sold to Amstrad in 1985, which continued to use it as a label until 1992
Sirius Software	Sacramento, California, United States	1980	Wayout	defunct 1984
Sir-Tech	New York City, United States	1979	Wizardry	defunct 2003
Skybound Entertainment	Beverly Hills, California, United States	2000		
Slitherine	Epsom, Surrey, United Kingdom	2000	Panzer Corps; Distant Worlds	publisher of strategy and wargames on PC, Mac, mobile and home consoles
SNK	Osaka, Japan	2001	Ikari Warriors; Fatal Fury; World Heroes; Samurai Showdown; Art of Fighting	acquired by 37Games in 2015, later acquired by MiSK Foundation through EGDC in 2020
SOFEL	Tokyo, Japan	1979	Wall Street Kid	no longer publishes video games
Soft-World	Taipei, Taiwan	1983	Heroes of Jin Yong	
Softape	United States	1978	Apple II games	defunct 1983
Softdisk	Shreveport, Louisiana, United States	1981	Catacomb 3-D	defunct 2016
SoftKey	United States	1978	Oregon Trail II	known as Micro International Corp. until 1989, as WordStar International Inc. until 1994, as The Learning Company in 1996; continued to use the SoftKey label on some software until 1999, when the company was acquired by Mattel
Softek International Ltd	London, England, United Kingdom	1980	Quo Vadis	defunct 1989 published some games under the label The Edge
SoftSide	United States	1978	Arena of Octos	defunct 1984
Softstar	Taipei, Taiwan	1988	The Legend of Sword and Fairy	
Software 2000	Eutin, Germany	1987	Fast Food Tycoon	defunct 2002
The Software Exchange	Milford, New Hampshire, United States	1978	Atlantic Balloon Crossing	publishing arm of SoftSide; initially known as TRS-80 Software Exchange. Defunct 1984
Software Projects	Liverpool, England, United Kingdom	1983	Jet Set Willy	defunct 1985
Sony Imagesoft	Los Angeles, California, United States	1989	Super Dodge Ball	initially known as CSG Imagesoft; defunct 1995
Sony Interactive Entertainment	San Mateo, California, United States	1993	Ratchet & Clank series Jak and Daxter series God of War series Killzone series Uncharted series Resistance series	publishing under the PlayStation Studios label since 2020
Sony Pictures Digital	California, United States	1997		publisher of mobile phone games
SouthPeak Games	Virginia, United States	1996	Two Worlds	
Spectral Associates	Tacoma, Washington, United States	1980	various TRS-80 Color Computer games	published last game in 1988
Spectravideo	United States	1981	Mangia	published Atari 2600 games under the label Spectravision; defunct 1988
Spectrum HoloByte	Alameda, California, United States	1983		video game developer; acquired by MicroProse
Spike	Tokyo, Japan	1991	Danganronpa: Trigger Happy Havoc	merged with Chunsoft in 2012
Spike Chunsoft	Tokyo, Japan	1984	Danganronpa series Science Adventure series Zero Escape series	video game developer and localizer; formerly known as Chunsoft before it merged with Spike in 2012; subsidiary of Dwango
Spil Games	Hilversum, The Netherlands	2001		video game developer; acquired by Azerion in 2020
Spinnaker Software	Cambridge, Massachusetts, United States	1982	In Search of the Most Amazing Thing	acquired by The Learning Company in 1994
Square	Tokyo, Japan	1986	Final Fantasy	video game developer; merged with Enix to create Square Enix
Square Electronic Arts	Costa Mesa, California, United States	1998	Parasite Eve	joint venture between Square (70%) and Electronic Arts (30%) to publish Square's titles in North America. EA's stake sold to Square in 2003 during preparations for Square Enix merger.
Square Enix	Tokyo, Japan	1975	Dragon Quest series Final Fantasy series	
Stardock	Livonia, Michigan, United States	1991	Sins of a Solar Empire; Galactic Civilizations	video game developer
Starpath	Livermore, California, United States	1981	Escape from the Mindmaster	defunct 1984
Starwave	Bellevue, Washington, United States	1993	Castle Infinity	defunct 1998
Stern Electronics	Chicago, Illinois, United States	1977	Berzerk	ceased video game production in 1985
StickyLock	Amsterdam, Netherlands	2018	Woven	
Sting Entertainment	Tokyo, Japan	1989	Last Battalion	
Storm Impact	Glenview, Illinois, United States	1989	TaskMaker	defunct 1997
Storm8	Redwood Shores, California, United	2009		
Strategic Simulations (SSI)	Sunnyvale, California, United States	1979		video game developer acquired by Ubisoft, name retired
Strategic Studies Group	Australia	1983	Reach for the Stars	no longer publishes video games; their games are now published by Matrix Games
Strat-O-Matic	Glen Head, New York, United States	1961	Strat-O-Matic Computer Baseball	no longer publishes video games
Stormfront Studios	San Rafael, California, United States	1988	Old Time Baseball	defunct 2008
Strategy First	Montreal, Quebec, Canada	1988	Europa Universalis	
Studio e.go!	Osaka, Japan	1998	Angel's Feather	defunct 2009
Sublogic	Urbana-Champaign, Illinois, United States	1975	Flight Simulator	acquired by Sierra in 1995
Success	Tokyo, Japan	1978		video game developer
Sunflowers Interactive Entertainment Software	Heusenstamm, Germany	1993	Anno 1602	acquired by Ubisoft in 2007
Sunrise Interactive	Japan	1998	Mai-HiME: Unmei no Keitōju	defunct 2008
Sunsoft	Aichi, Japan	1981	Aero the Acro-Bat	closed U.S. offices, operates out of Japan
Superior Software	Leeds, England, United Kingdom	1982	Citadel	
Supersoft	Harrow, London, United Kingdom	1978	Air Attack	ceased publishing video games in 1985
Sydney Development Corporation	Vancouver, British Columbia, Canada	1978		defunct 1989
Super Fighter Team	San Diego, California, United States	2004	Legend of Wukong	
Suzy Soft	Zagreb, Croatia	1985	various ZX Spectrum and Commodore 64 games	software division of Suzy Records; defunct 1988
Synapse Software	Richmond, California	1981	Blue Max	purchased by Broderbund in 1984; defunct 1986
Synergistic Software	Seattle, Washington, United States	1978	Odyssey: The Compleat Apventure	acquired by Sierra in 1996; defunct 1999
SystemSoft	Japan	1985	Daisenryaku	no longer publishes video games
System 3	London, England, United Kingdom	1982	The Last Ninja, International Karate, Myth: History in the Making	video game developer
System Sacom	Tokyo, Japan	1981		no longer publishes video games
Tactics	Japan	1997	One: Kagayaku Kisetsu e	acquired by Nexton in 1999, which has continued to use the Tactics brand on some games
Taito	Tokyo, Japan	1953	Bubble Bobble; Space Invaders	video game developer; acquired by Square Enix
Takara	Japan	1955	The Transformers: Mystery of Convoy	merged with Tomy in 2006
Take-Two Interactive	New York, New York, United States	1993		owns publishers Rockstar Games, 2K Games (2K Sports), and Private Division; a video game developer
TalonSoft	Baltimore, Maryland, United States	1995	Battleground	video game developer; acquired by Take-Two Interactive, name retired
Tamsoft	Tokyo, Japan	1992	Guardian's Crusade	
Tandy Corporation	Fort Worth, Texas, United States	1919	Microchess	ceased publishing games in 1989
Taxan	Japan	1981		no longer publishes video games
TDK Mediactive	Westlake Village, California, United States	1990	Lady Sia	american software publishing arm of TDK; defunct 2003
Team17	Wakefield, England, United Kingdom	1990	Worms series Alien Breed series Superfrog; Yooka-Laylee	video game developer
Team Shanghai Alice	Japan	1996	Touhou Project	
Techland	Ostrów Wielkopolski, Poland	1991		Publishes games under the "Techland Publishing" label
Technical Group Laboratory	Osaka, Japan	1984		known as TGL
Technology and Entertainment Software	Japan	1982	Hydlide	known as T&E Soft; ceased publishing video games in 2002
Technosoft	Sasebo, Nagasaki, Japan	1980	Thunder Force	acquired by Twenty-one Company in 2001, now Sega
Technōs Japan	Tokyo, Japan	1981	Double Dragon; Kunio-kun	video game developer; assets acquired by Atlus and now by Arc System Works
TecMagik	California, United States	1991		video game developer
Tecmo	Japan	1967	Bomb Jack; Ninja Gaiden series Tecmo Bowl; Dead or Alive series	merged into Tecmo Koei
Tectoy	São Paulo, Brazil	1987	many games for Sega consoles in Brazil	
Telarium	Cambridge, Massachusetts, United States	1984	Fahrenheit 451	defunct 1987
Telesys	Fremont, California, United States	1982	Fast Food	defunct 1984
Telenet Japan	Japan	1983	Valis: The Fantasm Soldier	defunct 2007
Telltale Games	San Rafael, California, United States	2004		defunct 2018
Tencent	Shenzhen, China	1998		video game developer and online services company; has a minority stake in Epic Games and owns Riot Games as a subsidiary
Tengen	Milpitas, California, United States	1987	Tetris	console publishing arm of Atari Games; folded into Time Warner Interactive in 1994
Texas Instruments	Dallas, Texas, United States	1930	Parsec	exited the video game industry in 1984
Thalion Software	Gütersloh, Germany	1988	Amberstar	defunct 1994
The9	Shanghai, China	1999		former regional publisher for World of Warcraft in China
The Learning Company	San Francisco, California, United States	1980		merged with Mattel Interactive, no longer publishes video games
Thin Chen Enterprise	Taipei, Taiwan	1988	Colorful Dragon	used the labels Sachen, Commin, and Joy Van; defunct
Thinking Rabbit	Takarazuka, Japan	1982	Sokoban	defunct
THQ	Agoura Hills, California, United States	1989	Red Faction series S.T.A.L.K.E.R.: Shadow of Chernobyl; Saints Row series Tak and the Power of Juju; Destroy All Humans! series	video game developer; Nordic Games (now THQ Nordic) revived the THQ brand in 2016, and all THQ franchises folded to THQ Nordic
THQ Nordic	Austria	2011		purchased Darksiders, Red Faction, and MX vs; ATV franchises from THQ, previously called Nordic Games 2011–2016
Thorn EMI Computer Software	London, England, United Kingdom	1981	River Rescue	software publishing arm of Thorn EMI; spun off and reëstablished as Creative Sparks in 1984
Three-Sixty Pacific	United States	1987	Dark Castle	defunct 1994
Tiertex Design Studios	Manchester, United Kingdom	1987	Ace of Aces	last game published in 2003
Tiger Electronics	Vernon Hills, Illinois, United States	1978	various LCD games and Game.com games	video game developer; acquired by Hasbro in 1998
Tilting Point	New York City, United States	2012		
Time Warner Interactive	Milpitas, California, United States	1993	Primal Rage	merged into Midway Games West in 1996
Timeworks	Deerfield, Illinois	1982	Cave of the Word Wizard	acquired by Megalode Resources, Inc. in 1993, and renamed Timeworks International; defunct 1994
Titus Interactive	France	1985		
Toaplan	Japan	1984	Flying Shark; Fire Shark; Snow Bros. Truxton, acquired by Tatsujin Co., Ltd.	defunct 1994
Toei Animation	Tokyo, Japan	1956	Baltron	
Toho	Tokyo, Japan	1932	Godzilla: Monster of Monsters!	no longer publishes video games
Tokuma Shoten	Tokyo, Japan	1954	Incredible Crisis	no longer publishes video games
Tokyo Shoseki	Tokyo, Japan	1909	Cycle Race: Road Man	no longer publishes video games
Tomy (Takara Tomy)	Tokyo, Japan	1924	Pretty Rhythm	merged with Takara in 2006
Tommo	City of Industry, California	1990	Monster Rancher DS	
Tonkin House	Tokyo, Japan	1986	Gun-Nac	defunct 2008
Topologika	Stilton, United Kingdom	1983	Countdown to Doom	defunct 2013
Topo Soft	Spain	1987	Survivor	defunct 1994
TopWare Interactive	Karlsruhe, Germany	1995		video game developer; after filing for bankruptcy in 2001, it was acquired by Zuxxez Entertainment, and later resurrected in 2005; filed for bankruptcy again in 2016, but continues to publish future video games
Toshiba EMI	Tokyo, Japan	1960	Syvalion	defunct 2013
Towa Chiki	Tokyo, Japan	1986	A Week of Garfield	defunct 2001
Tradewest	Corsicana, Texas, United States	1986		acquired by Midway Games, name retired
Treco	Torrance, California	1990	Atomic Robo-Kid	defunct 1993
Triangle Service	Tokyo, Japan	2002	Trizeal	
Trilobyte Software	Medford, Oregon, United States	1990	Uncle Henry's Playhouse	defunct 1999, re-established in 2010
Tripwire Interactive	Roswell, Georgia, United States	2005	Killing Floor	acquired by Embracer Group in 2022
Tri Synergy	Dallas, Texas, United States	1996		
Tru Blu Entertainment	Sydney, Australia	1999	Rugby League	
TSR, Inc.	Lake Geneva, Wisconsin, United States	1973	Theseus and the Minotaur	founded as Tactical Studies Rules; acquired and dissolved in 1997 by Wizards of the Coast, which continued to use the TSR name as a label until 2000
Tsunami Games	Oakhurst, California, United States	1991	Blue Force	sold to Tsunami Media Corporation in 1999
TT Games	Maidenhead, England, United Kingdom	2005		video game developer; merger of Giant Interactive Entertainment and Traveller's Tales; acquired by Warner Bros. Interactive
Twilight Frontier	Japan	2002	Higurashi Daybreak	
Tynesoft	Blaydon, United Kingdom	1983	Superman: The Man of Steel	exited the video game industry in 1991
Type-Moon	Japan	2000	Tsukihime	
Ubisoft	Montreuil-sous-Bois, France	1986	Rayman series Assassin's Creed series Far Cry series Ghost Recon series Splinter Cell series Just Dance series	video game developer
UEP Systems	Tokyo, Japan	1985	Cool Boarders	defunct 2001
UFO Interactive Games	City of Industry, California	1999	Monster Rancher DS	label of Tommo
Ultimate Play the Game	Ashby-de-la-Zouch, United Kingdom	1982	Jetpac, Knight Lore	acquired by U.S. gold in 1985, which continued to use the Ultimate name as a label on some games; defunct 1988
Ultrasoft	Bratislava, Slovakia	1989	Towdie	defunct 1998
Ultra Games	Buffalo Grove, Illinois, United States	1988		Shell company and publishing label for Konami; name retired in 1992
United States Army	Arlington, Virginia, United States	1775	America's Army	
Universal Entertainment Corporation	Japan	1969	Mr. Do!	
UserJoy Technology	Taiwan	1995	The Legend of Three Kingdoms	
US Games	Santa Clara, California, United States	1978	Entombed	acquired by Quaker Oats in 1982; defunct 1983
Valve	Bellevue, Washington, United States	1996	Half-Life series Counter-Strike series Portal series Left 4 Dead series Dota 2	video game developer
VAP	Tokyo, Japan	1981	Isolated Warrior	no longer publishes video games
Varie	Japan	1986	Parallel World	defunct 1997
VEB Polytechnik	Chemnitz, Germany	1870	Poly Play	defunct 2006
Vectorbeam	California, United States	1978	Speed Freak	acquired by Cinematronics in 1980
Versus Evil	Baltimore, Maryland, United States	2014	The Banner Saga	Acquired by tinyBuild in 2021
Viacom	New York City, United States	1952	Phantom 2040	published video games under the Viacom New Media label; company split in 2005
Victor Interactive	Japan	1970	Shadow of the Beast	subsidiary of JVC; merged with Pack-In-Video in 1996; acquired by Marvelous Entertainment in 2003; defunct 2007
Vic Tokai	Shizuoka, Japan	1977		no longer publishes video games
Virgin Interactive	London, England, United Kingdom	1983	Global Gladiators	video game developer; known as Virgin Games until 1993; American branch acquired and closed by Electronic Arts in 1998, European branch acquired by Titus Software in 1999, and re-branded to Avalon Interactive in 2003; ceased publishing games after 2002
Virgin Play	Spain	1995	Touch the Dead	known as Virgin Interactive Espana SA until 2002; filed for liquidation in 2009
Visco Corporation	Japan	1982	Wardner	no longer publishes video games
VisiCorp	Massachusetts, United States	1976	Zork	known as Personal Software until 1982; acquired by Paladin Software in 1984
The Vision Factory	Den Bosch, The Netherlands	1993	various CD-i games	defunct 2002
VisualArt's	Osaka, Japan	1991	Kanon	
Vivarium Inc.	Tokyo, Japan	1993	SimTower	previously known as OPeNBooK Co., Ltd
Vivendi Games	Los Angeles, California United States	1993		merged with Activision to form Activision Blizzard in 2008
Vortex Software	Manchester, United Kingdom	1981	Highway Encounter	defunct 1990
Wales Interactive	Bridgend, Wales, United Kingdom	2012	The Bunker; Soul Axiom	video game developer
Walnut Creek CDROM	Walnut Creek, California, United States	1991	various shareware CD-ROMs	merged with Berkeley Software Design in 2000
Warashi	Tokyo, Japan	1995	Triggerheart Exelica	
Wargaming	Nicosia, Cyprus	1998	World of Tanks; World of Warplanes; World of Warships	video game developer
Warner Bros. Interactive	Burbank, California, United States	1993	F.E.A.R. 2 Overlord	publishes under the Portkey Games label
WARP	Japan	1994	Enemy Zero	exited the video game industry in 1999, defunct 2005
Webfoot Technologies	Lemont, Illinois, United States	1993	Deadly Rooms of Death	
Webzen	Seoul, South Korea	2000		video game developer
Wemade Max	South Korea	1990	Silkroad Online	
WildTangent	Redmond, Washington, United States	1998	Fate: The Traitor Soul	acquired by Gamigo AG in 2019
Williams Electronics	Chicago, Illinois, United States	1943	Robotron 2084, Defender	exited the video game industry in 1998
Windham Classics	Cambridge, Massachusetts, United States	1984	Below the Root	published last game in 1985
Wired Productions	Watford, United Kingdom	2008	Fractured Minds	
Wisdom Tree	Tucson, Arizona, United States	1989		known for Christian-themed games
WizardWorks	Minneapolis, Minnesota, United States	1990	Deer Hunter	acquired by GT Interactive in 1996; defunct 2004
Wolf Team	Tokyo, Japan	1986	Annet Futatabi	acquired by Namco in 2003
Working Designs	Redding, California, United States	1986	Lunar	specialized in the localization of Japan-native RPGs
Xonox	Minnesota, United States	1983	Artillery Duel	defunct 1984
Xseed Games	Torrance, California, United States	2005	Ys Seven	subsidiary of Marvelous
XS Games	New York, New York, United States	2002		
Yeti	Japan	2005	Root Double: Before Crime * After Days	
Yodo1	Beijing, China	2011		
Yogscast Games	Bristol, United Kingdom	2017	Caveblazers	Game publishing arm of Yogscast
Yojigen	Japan	1994	WildSnake	defunct
Yuke's	Osaka, Japan	1993	Evil Zone	
Yutaka	Japan	1990	Last Armageddon	defunct 2003 following merger with Popy
Zaccaria	Bologna, Italy	1974	various arcade games	defunct 1988
ZAPiT Games	Mississauga, Ontario, Canada	2003	Game Wave Family Entertainment System	defunct
ZeniMax Media	United States	1999	The Elder Scrolls, Doom, Fallout, Wolfenstein	owns publisher Bethesda Softworks; acquired by Microsoft in 2021
Zenobi	Rochdale, United Kingdom	1982	various text adventure games	
Zeppelin Games	Gateshead, United Kingdom	1987	Draconus	acquired by Merit Studios Inc. in 1994 and renamed to Merit Studios Europe; regained independence in 1996 and reëstablished itself as Eutechnyx; no longer publishes its own games
Zigurat	Spain	1986	various ZX Spectrum games	published last game in 1992
ZiMAD	San Francisco, California, United States	2009	Magic Jigsaw Puzzles	
Zimag	United States	1982	Dishaster	publishing label of Magnetic Tape International; defunct 1983
Zoom	Sapporo, Japan	1988	Overtake	
Zuxxez Entertainment	Karlsruhe, Germany	2001		acquired TopWare Interactive in 2001; renamed itself to TopWare Interactive in 2005; name retired
Zushi Games	Sheffield, England, United Kingdom	1999		
Zynga	San Francisco, California	2007	FarmVille; Mafia Wars various mobile games	Acquired by Take-Two Interactive in January 2022
ZyX	Japan	1994		

== See also ==
- List of video game developers
- List of largest video game publishers by revenue
- List of indie game developers
- Video game developer
- Video game publisher
- Game development
- Video game industry
- History of video games
