= Zenkoku Kōkō Soccer =

1994 video game

- Cover art
- Developer(s): Affect
- Publisher(s): Yojigen
- Series: Zenkoku Kōkō Soccer
- Platform(s): Super Famicom
- Release: JP: November 25, 1994
- Genre(s): Traditional soccer simulation
- Mode(s): Single-player; Multiplayer

Zenkoku Kōkō Soccer (全国高校サッカー, "High School Soccer Tournament of Japan Cup") is a soccer simulation game, developed by Affect and published by Yojigen, which was released exclusively in Japan in 1994. It features teams from the Japanese high schools. These teams are located on the islands in addition to the mainland.

Two sequels were spawned: Zenkoku Kōkō Soccer 2 and Zenkoku Kōkō Soccer Senshuken '96.

== See also ==
- All Japan High School Soccer Tournament
