= Tetris 2 =

Tetris 2 is the title of three unrelated games.

Tetris 2 may refer to:

- Tetris 2 (1990 video game) for the ZX Spectrum, published by Ultrasoft
- Tetris 2 + BomBliss, a 1991 video game for the Family Computer, published by Bullet-Proof Software
- Tetris 2 (1993 video game) for the Nintendo Entertainment System, Game Boy and Super Nintendo Entertainment System published by Nintendo

== See also ==
- List of Tetris variants
