= Zenkoku Kōkō Soccer 2 =

1995 video game

- Cover art
- Developer(s): Nihon Syscom
- Publisher(s): Yojigen
- Series: Zenkoku Kōkō Soccer
- Platform(s): Super Famicom
- Release: JP: November 17, 1995
- Genre(s): Traditional soccer simulation
- Mode(s): Single-player; Multiplayer

Zenkoku Kōkō Soccer 2 (全国高校サッカー2; "High School Soccer Tournament of Japan Cup 2") is a soccer simulation game, developed by Nihon Syscom and published by Yojigen, which was released exclusively in Japan in 1995. It features teams from the Japanese high schools from the islands in addition to the mainland.

This game is a sequel to Zenkoku Kōkō Soccer and a prequel to Zenkoku Kōkō Soccer Senshuken '96.

== Reception ==
On release, the game was scored a 20 out of 40 by a panel of four reviewers at Famicom Tsūshin.

== See also ==
- All Japan High School Soccer Tournament
