= Nolan Ryan's Baseball =

1991 video game

- North American cover art
- Developer: Affect
- Publishers: JP: SETA Corporation; NA: Romstar
- Platform: Super NES
- Release: JP: July 2, 1991; NA: February 1992
- Genre: Sports
- Modes: Single-player, multiplayer

Nolan Ryan's Baseball (known in Japan as Super Stadium (スーパースタジアム)) is a baseball video game endorsed by then-Texas Rangers baseball player Nolan Ryan; one of the most popular baseball players of the late 20th century. It has no licensing from Major League Baseball and the Major League Baseball Players Association; meaning that Nolan Ryan is the only non-fictional ballplayer in the entire game. All the other players have names that appear to be given names while Nolan Ryan uses his surname. The game was developed by Japanese game studio Affect, and was one of their earliest productions.

== Gameplay ==
Different modes for playing include exhibition and regular season (lasting anywhere from ten games per team to an impressive 100 games per team). Unusual for a game at that time, it allowed a position player to be chosen as a relief pitcher or even as a starting pitcher. There is no designated hitter rule in this game so that the pitchers must go up to bat with their .150 batting average (which is below the Mendoza Line). While pitchers are not expected to hit above the Mendoza Line, having a hitter (or a group of hitters) go through a season with a batting average below .200 could indicate a lack of player skill.

North American batting screen.

There is no playoffs mode after regular season because all the teams are under one league, but if more than one team has the lead for the pennant, a short elimination tournament will be held to determine the champion. The graphics were said to look "childish" although the pitches are similar in speed to the actual Major League Baseball of that time. Players also have a tendency to march down the field at a slow speed regardless of their ratings and throws from the outfield tend to be less powerful than similar throws done from the infield.

The stats are followed throughout the entire year (for all the teams involved) and are adjusted after every play. Baseball players can be created from scratch, traded to other teams in favor of their pre-existing players, traded in for free agents, and have their attributes altered in order to make the perfect ballplayer.

== Reviews ==
Nintendo Power gave the game scores of 66% for play control, 60% for gameplay challenge, and 50% for the game overall theme and fun factor.

Famitsu gave the game a score of 25/40.
