= Crux 92 =

1992 video game

- Publisher(s): Ultrasoft
- Designer(s): Marek Trefny
- Platform(s): ZX Spectrum
- Release: 1992
- Genre(s): Action
- Mode(s): Single-player

Crux 92 is an action game for the ZX Spectrum developed by Marek Trefny and published by Ultrasoft in 1992.

== Plot ==
The game is set in 2210 when a spaceship IKERI sets up from TRICHI base on Mars. The task of its crew is to find deposits of Filium (the main material of the 23rd century) in Crux constellation. Spaceships can at these times replenish fuel and food on bases that were built on little planets. These bases are controlled by a Main Robot whose minions are less intelligent robots. Problem is that when IKERI needs to replenish its resources, the crew finds out that the base they need to land on is led by a main robot who revolted against humans and built a huge complex with 60 floors. If the crew wants to land on the planet, The main robot has to be destroyed along with the complex. One of the crew members is sent to the complex where he tries to accomplish the task.

The crew member gets through all floors and activates the self-destruction in every single floor, which destroys the main robot and the complex. IKERI can now replenish its resources and continue in its mission.

== Gameplay ==
The player controls a cosmonaut whose goal is to destroy all enemies in the level and activate bombs. He can push red boxes to change the way of enemy. Heh has to lure them this way into mines that kill them. When he kills all enemies, he has to get to the switch and activate planted bombs. When bombs are planted, player has to get away from them, otherwise is killed.

== Development ==
The game was developed by a Prague-based developer Marek Trefny. It was made with a programme OCP Editor + Assembler. The graphics was created in OCP Art Studio and Artist 2. It was the first title by Trefny.

== Reception ==
The game was reviewed in Ultrasoft's own video game magazine BiT. It scored with 91%. The biggest praise was gained for the gameplay and the idea of the game. The story was also praised. The reviewer called Crux 92 a "splendid game that overcome all his expectations."
