= Ultrasoft =

Slovakian computer game developer-publisher

- Industry: Video games
- Founded: 1989
- Defunct: 1998
- Fate: Dissolved
- Successor: Cyberdreams
- Headquarters: Bratislava, Slovakia
- Key people: Louis Wittek, founder
- Products: Towdie, Atomix, Hexagonia
- Number of employees: 10+
- Subsidiaries: Bit magazine

Ultrasoft was a computer game developer and computer game publisher located in Bratislava, Slovakia. The company specialised in the development and publishing of games for the ZX Spectrum home computer. With over 40 titles published, its most successful including the platform game Towdie and puzzle games Atomix and Hexagonia – Atomix 2. Ultrasoft also acted as an exclusive distributor within the territory of Czechoslovakia for Domark and Ocean Software game software houses based in the UK. Apart from computer games, the company also published a dozen or so non-game titles, mostly for learning foreign languages, as well as text, image, sound and music editors.

The company was founded by Louis Wittek in 1989, and dissolved in 1998.

== Published games ==
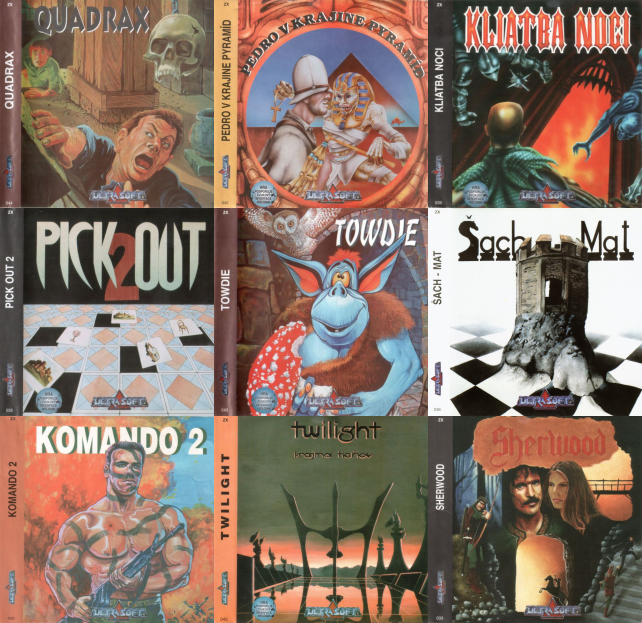
Example of Cover Art from some of the Ultrasoft's titles

All games by Ultrasoft
Title	Year	Developer (Country)	Genre
Arkarum	1990	Rumatisoft (Slovakia)	Shoot 'em up
Atomix	1991	Scorpion (Czech Republic)	Puzzle video game
Axons	1992	Ľubomír Salanci (Slovakia)	Shoot 'em up
Cesta Bojovníka (Way of the Warrior)	1992	KM Soft (Czech Republic)	Fighting game
Chrobák Truhlík (Beetle Dim-witt)	1991	Sybilasoft (Slovakia)	Text adventure
Crux 92	1992	Marek Trefný (Czech Republic)	Action Puzzle video game
Dokonalá vražda II - Bukapao (Perfect murder II - Bukapao)	1991	Ľudovít Wittek (Slovakia)	Text adventure
Double Dash	1991	Fuxoft (Czech Republic)	Action Puzzle video game
F.I.R.E.	1991	Fuxoft (Czech Republic)	Shoot 'em up
Galactic Gunners	1992	Cybexlab Software (Czech Republic)	Shoot 'em up
Hexagonia – Atomix 2	1992	Scorpion (Czech Republic)	Puzzle video game
Jet-Story	1992	Cybexlab Software (Czech Republic)	Arcade game
Kliatba Noci (Curse of the Night)	1993	Microtech Systems (United States); DSA Computer Graphics (Slovakia)	Action-adventure game
Komando 2 (Commando 2)	1992	Microtech Systems (United States); DSA Computer Graphics (Slovakia)	Shoot 'em up
Logic	1991	Rumatisoft (Slovakia)	Puzzle video game
Notorik	1992	Bytepack (Slovakia)	Action-adventure game
Octopussy	1992	Bytepack (Slovakia)	Text adventure
Pedro 1 (Pedro on the Pirates' Island)	1992	Gold Storm (Slovakia)	Action-adventure game
Pedro 2 (Pedro in the Haunted Castle)	1993	Gold Storm (Slovakia)	Action-adventure game
Pedro 3 (Pedro in the Land of Pyramids)	1993	Gold Storm (Slovakia)	Action-adventure game
Phantom F4 - Part 1	1992	Microtech Systems DSA Computer Graphics (United States); DSA Computer Graphics (Slovakia)	Action game
Phantom F4 - Part 2	1992	Microtech Systems (United States); DSA Computer Graphics (Slovakia)	Action game
Pick Out 2	1993	Bytepack (Slovakia)	Puzzle video game
Prva Akcia (First Heist)	1992	Microtech Systems (United States); DSA Computer Graphics (Slovakia)	Arcade game
Quadrax	1994	David Durčák and Marián Ferko (Slovakia)	Puzzle video game
Rýchle Šípy 1 (Swift Arrows 1)	1991	Májasoft and CIDsoft (Czech Republic)	Text adventure
Rýchle Šípy 2 (Swift Arrows 2)	1991	Májasoft and CIDsoft (Czech Republic)	Text adventure
Sach-Mat (Check-Mate)	1992	Ján Deák (Slovakia)	Chess video game
Sherwood	1992	DSA Computer Graphics (Slovakia)	Action Strategy video game
Skladačka (Puzzle)	1992	Deltasoft (Slovakia)	Text adventure
Star Dragon	1991	Scorpion (Czech Republic)	Shoot 'em up
Tetris 2	1991	Fuxoft (Czech Republic)	Puzzle video game
Towdie	1994	DSA Computer Graphics (Slovakia)	Action-adventure game
Twilight - Krajina Tieňov (Twilight - The Land of Shadows)	1995	Ľubomír Dekan, Radoslav Javor and Norbert Grellneth (Slovakia)	Adventure game

== Other published titles ==
- Baby Mantrik (English for children)
- Datalog 2 (Database)
- DTP Machine Utility (DTP editor)
- DTP Machine Professional Pack (Image/Text/DTP editor)
- Mantrik Anglicky (Learning English)
- Mantrik Nemecky (Learning German)
- Mantrik Editor – Professor (Create your own lessons for Mantrik)
- Mrs08E (ZX Spectrum Assembler editor)
- ScreenMachine (Image editor)
- SoundTracker (Music editor)
- TextMachine (Text editor)
- Tuition (Sinclair BASIC for beginners)
- ZX-7 (Music & Sound editor)

== Bit magazine ==
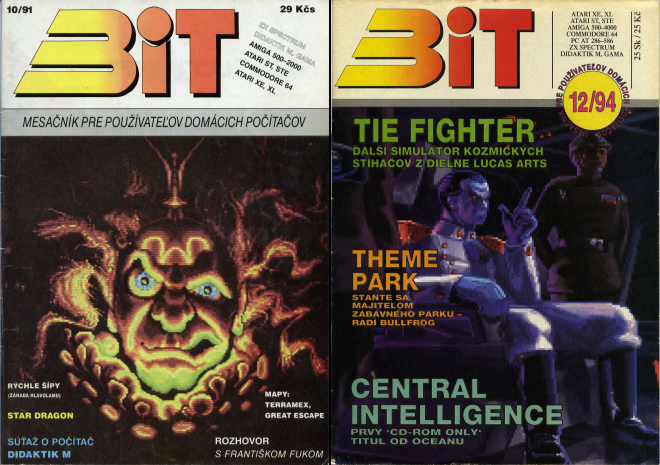
Cover pages from the first and the last issue of the Bit magazine

Between 1991 and 1994 Ultrasoft also published a specialised monthly magazine, Bit, aimed at owners of home computers and dealing with computer games in particular.
