= Baltron =

1986 video game

- Cover art
- Developer(s): Shouei System
- Publisher(s): Toei Animation
- Platform(s): Family Computer
- Release: JP: March 19, 1986
- Genre(s): Scrolling shooter
- Mode(s): Single-player, multiplayer

Baltron (バルトロン) is a horizontally scrolling shooter for the Family Computer that was released exclusively for the Japanese market on March 19, 1986.

== Plot ==
Taking a cue from the popular Star Wars series opening crawl (with its catch phase A long time ago, in a galaxy far, far away...), the title screen contains the nearly identical catch phrase of A long long time ago. In the year 2999, people from the planet Star Lenion (which is very similar to planet Earth) are under attack from the Bismark Empire.

== Gameplay ==
The player's ship (left) is approaching a group of enemies.

The game is side-scrolling shooter where players must defeat enemy aircraft and depart from their launch pad.

=== Items ===
Blue capsule
Energy is restored up to the maximum.
Yellow capsule
The player's machine would be invincible for a certain period of time. However, hitting the terrain would still destroy the player.
Koala
Grants the player an extra life.
