= Rhode Island Soft Systems =

American software development and new media company

Rhode Island Soft Systems (also known as R.I. Soft Systems and RISS) was an American software development and new media company based in Woonsocket, Rhode Island. The company was best known for developing screensavers, computer games and programming tools for Microsoft Windows.

== Early history ==
Rhode Island Soft Systems was founded in 1990 by Eric Robichaud. Originally conceived as a side venture to Robichaud’s full-time work as a programmer with CVS Caremark Corporation, Robichaud’s first product a screensaver for MS-DOS called BLANK-IT. Additional products were created, and by 1994 Robichaud left CVS to start his own company.

Among the first Rhode Island Soft Systems products to gain wide attention was a 1994 signature font product that enabled computer users to incorporate their signature word processing documents. The company also created a digital jigsaw puzzle game called Jixxa, and received commissions to create screensavers and interactive CD-ROMs to promote Folgers Coffee, the New York Knicks and Harley Davidson motorcycles.

== Product lines ==
During the late 1990s, the company created a series of whimsical screensavers that poked fun at popular culture figures and trends. Among its most notable titles were Hey, Macaroni!, which used animated dancing noodles to spoof the Macarena craze, and Liverdance, which parodied Michael Flatley’s Lord of the Dance success with a troupe of anthropomorphic livers performing Irish stepdancing. Liverdance, released in 1998, was also the first screensaver that incorporated built-in multiple advertisements, with Hasbro Interactive, Prodigy, Barnes & Noble, Symantec and WinZip as the first advertisers.

Beyond its consumer products, the company created programming tools including Image Carousel Professional Edition and Ovation Studio Pro.

== Company expansion and sale ==
In 1999, the company acquired Mediaweave, a Providence, Rhode Island–based company that produced multimedia projects and Web sites. By 2000, Rhode Island Soft Systems grew to US$1 million in annual sales.

In 2003, Rhode Island Soft Systems was sold to Freeze.com, a Waite Park, Minnesota–based screensaver development company. The transaction included a five-year development and sponsorship contract that highlighted the Rhode Island Soft Systems products on the Freeze.com web site.
