= Tetris 2 (1990 video game) =

- Developers: Fuxoft; TRC Software
- Publisher: Ultrasoft
- Platform: ZX Spectrum
- Release: 1990
- Genre: Puzzle
- Modes: Single-player, multiplayer

Tetris 2 is a 1990 video game by František Fuka (Fuxoft). It is inspired by a Soviet game Tetris. It is considered to be the most successful game developed by Fuka.

== Development ==
The game was developed in 1990 by František Fuka. Fuka said in his interview for server ZX Spectrum Games that the development took only 14 days but in an interview with Jaroslav Švelch he admitted that it was possibly a little longer thanks to the longevity. Fuka created 90 levels to the game when he lost inspiration so he asked his friend Tomáš Rylek to make them. Rylek made 10 levels but their design was influenced by the fact that Rylek was drunk at that moment. Fuka decided to use all these levels with exception of one containing a rhombus. The game was betatested by Fuka and his friends including Tomáš Rylek and Miroslav Fídler. Fuka later sold rights for all his games to Ultrasoft. Ultrasoft then re-released Tetris 2 for commercial means.

== Gameplay ==
The game features two modes. The first one is a normal Tetris mode and the other one is Tetris 2 mode. The former contains the same gameplay as the original game. The latter contains almost 100 levels. Each of them contains a diagram of some shape. The player must complete a task given them in every level. There are 3 different tasks - "Fulfill Your Quota", "Destroy All Bricks" and "Survive xx Seconds". The player advances to the next level even if they fail but loses one life. In every 5th level is a bonus that allows player to obtain a life. Tetris 2 also offers a multiplayer game.
