= StickyLock =

Dutch video game developer

StickyLock Games B.V.
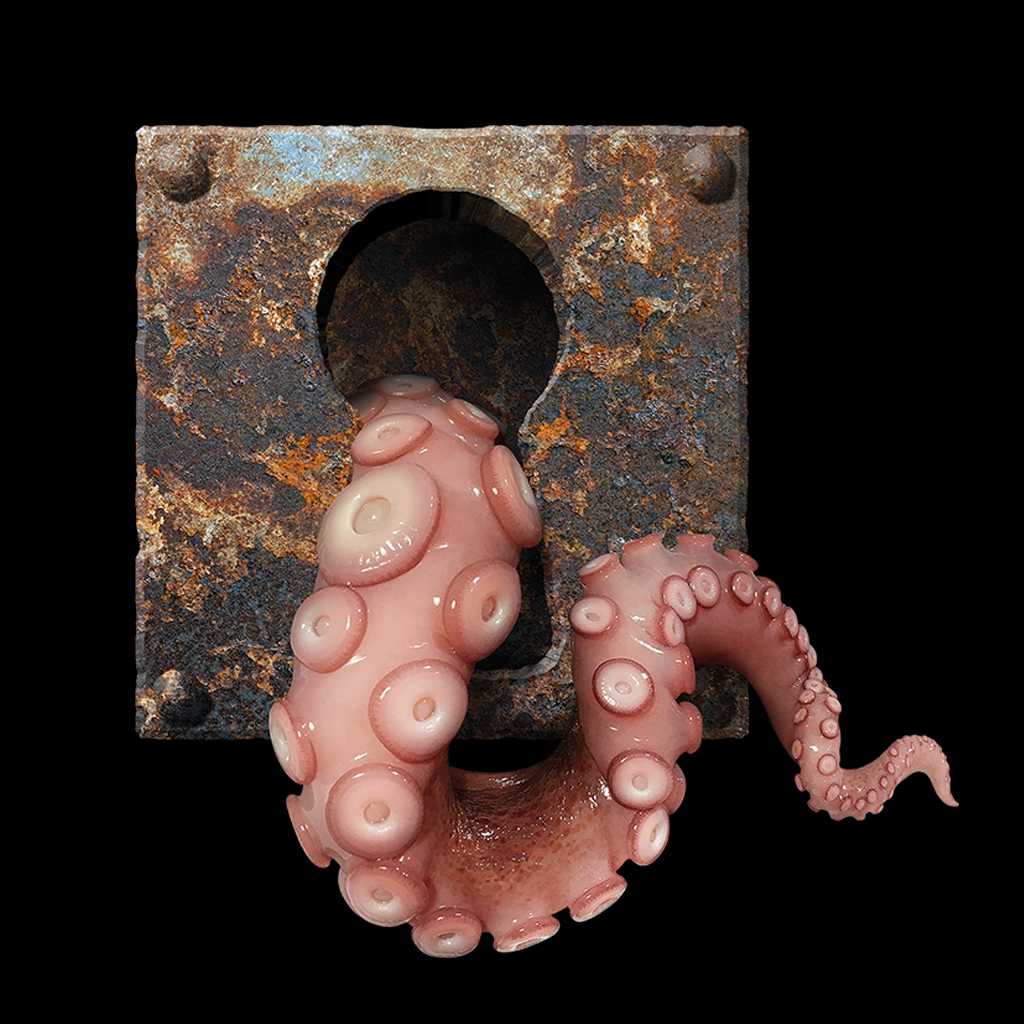
- Trade name: StickyLock Games
- Type: Private
- Industry: Video games
- Founded: 1 January 2018; 8 years ago
- Headquarters: Amsterdam, Netherlands
- Number of employees: 50 (April 2024)
- Website: stickylock.com

StickyLock is an independent game development studio and publisher based in Amsterdam, the Netherlands. The studio was founded in 2018 and as of 2024 it has more than 50 employees. The studio is also known for its projects in Virtual Reality (VR), Augmented Reality (AR) as well its other games.

StickyLock Games B.V. (the games development division of the StickyLock Group) was declared bankrupt on 17 July 2024.

== Projects ==
=== Histera ===
Histera is a multiplayer first-person shooter with a "Glitch" mechanic that transforms sections of the play area in real-time during the game, with scenery from one time period changing to scenery from a different period. StickyLock is developing and publishing the game. The game was released into Early Access on Steam on 20 June 2024.

A game demo was available to play during Steam Next Fest in October 2023.

=== Woven ===
Woven is a single-player third-person adventure game developed by Alterego Games and published by StickyLock. It was released on Android, iPad, iPhone, Steam, PlayStation 4, Nintendo Switch, and Xbox One on 15 November 2019. Woven invites players to embark on a journey through a world of fabric, filled with puzzles and exploration.

The game received a 63 "Mixed or Average" rating on Xbox One, and didn't earn enough reviews to receive a rating on other platforms. On Steam it has a "Mostly Positive" rating. It was nominated for Best Narrative Design at the Gamebakery Awards in 2020.

=== Sanity of Morris ===
Sanity of Morris is a psychological thriller developed by Alterego Games and published by StickyLock, offering players a mystery narrative set in the town of Morris.

=== Shadows's Edge ===
Shadow's Edge is a mobile game created by Digging Deep and co-developed by StickyLock and Little Chicken Game Company. The game is available on iOS and Android. It was released on 16 October 2017. The game is designed to help young people cope with chronic illness. Shadow's Edge combines gameplay with therapeutic storytelling, providing players with a safe and supportive environment to express themselves and explore their emotions.

=== Spark - Albert Cuypgarage VR ===
Spark - Albert Cuypgarage VR is a virtual reality (VR) experience developed by StickyLock in collaboration with local authorities. This project offers users a unique perspective on urban planning and infrastructure, allowing them to explore the Albert Cuypgarage in VR and gain insights into its design and impact on the surrounding environment. The Albert Cuypgarage is an underground parking garage seen as innovative due to its being the first parking garage to be built under an existing canal in the Netherlands.
