= Strat-O-Matic Computer Baseball =

1986 video game

- Developer(s): Strat-O-Matic
- Publisher(s): Strat-O-Matic
- Release: 1986

Strat-O-Matic Computer Baseball is a 1986 video game published by Strat-O-Matic.

== Gameplay ==
Strat-O-Matic Computer Baseball is a game in which the Strat-O-Matic Baseball board game is adapted.

== Reception ==
Duane E. Widner reviewed the game for Computer Gaming World, and stated that "For statistical accuracy, few games have ever reached the level enjoyed by Strat-O-Matic."

Win Rogers reviewed version 3.0 of the game for Computer Gaming World, and stated that "Any baseball enthusiast with a strong interest in statistics should take a look at this absorbing program, if only to understand other computer simulations better. In fact, those who have no interest in graphics and simply want a satisfying statistical simulation may find Strat-O-Matic Computer Baseball (Version 3.0) to be the best baseball program of all."

== Reviews ==
- Computer Gaming World #94
- Game Players PC Entertainment (May 1993)
- Electronic Entertainment (April 1994)
