= Rabbit Software =

Video game publisher

Rabbit Software was an English software company founded by Alan Savage and Heather Lamont which produced video games for home computers such as the ZX Spectrum, VIC-20, and Commodore 64 in the early to mid-1980s. Rabbit's later software packaging was slightly different from that of the other software houses of the time, as the cassettes were encased within an outer red box which made them more distinctive on the shop shelves.

Rabbit went into voluntary liquidation in August 1984 after Savage committed suicide following a car crash.

== Games ==
=== Commodore 64 ===
- Annihilator
- Centropods
- Cyclons
- Death Star
- Escape-MCP
- Galleons
- Graphics Editor
- Lancer Lords
- Monopole
- Murder
- Navarone
- Pakacuda
- Paratroopers
- Potty Painter in the Jungle
- Protector
- Skramble
- Stalag 1
- Supercuda
- The Colonel's House
- Trooper Truck

=== VIC-20 ===
- Alien Soccer
- Annihilator
- Anti-Matter Splatter
- Carrier Attack
- The Catch
- Centropods
- The Colonel's House
- Cosmic Battle
- Critters
- Cyclons
- Dam Busta
- Dune Buggy
- English Invaders
- Escape MCP
- Frogger
- Galactic Crossfire
- Grave robbers
- Hopper
- Jungle
- Krell
- Lunar Rescue
- Myriad
- Night Crawler
- Night-Flight
- Orbis
- Pakakuda
- Paratroopers
- Quackers
- Rabbit Chase
- Rabbit Writer
- Race Fun
- Ski-Run
- Skramble
- Space Phreeks
- Space Storm
- Superworm
- Tank-War

=== ZX Spectrum ===
- The Birds
- Centropods
- Death Star
- The Great Fire of London
- Lancer Lords
- Joust
- Murder
- Pakacuda
- Paratroopers
- Phantasia
- Potty Painter
