= Yojigen =

Japanese Video Game Company

Yojigen 株式会社 四次元
- Industry: Video games
- Headquarters: Japan

Yojigen (株式会社 四次元) was a Japanese company who published video games. The most notable titles published by the company were the manga-based Hana no Keiji: Kumo no Kanata ni and Super Snakey (known in North America as WildSnake), a game endorsed by Alexey Pajitnov.

== Video games ==
=== Game Boy ===
- Super Snakey (1994)
- Nada Asatarou no Powerful Mahjong: Tsugi no Itte 100 Dai (1994)
- Otogi Banashi Taisen (1995)

=== Super Famicom ===
- Mahjong Sengoku Monogatari (1994)
- Hana no Keiji: Kumo no Kanata ni (1994)
- Zenkoku Kōkō Soccer (1994)
- Super Snakey (1994)
- Zenkoku Kōkō Soccer 2 (1995)

== See also ==
- List of fighting game companies
- List of video games based on anime or manga
