= WildSnake =

1994 video game

- North American SNES box art
- Developer(s): Bullet-Proof Software (Game Boy); Manley & Associates (SNES)
- Publisher(s): NA: Spectrum Holobyte; JP: Yojigen
- Designer(s): Alexey Lysogorov
- Composer(s): Robert Ridihalgh (SNES); Greg Turner (Game Boy)
- Platform(s): Game Boy, Super NES
- Release: SNES: NA: September 1994; JP: December 16, 1994; Game Boy: NA: September 1994; JP: December 20, 1994
- Genre(s): Puzzle

WildSnake (Note: Known in Japan as Super Snakey (Japanese: スーパー・スネーキー)) is a puzzle video game inspired by Tetris. Snakes of varying colors and lengths fall from the top of the screen and slither to the bottom. The goal is to clear out the snakes by touching two of the same color. WildSnake was designed by Alexey Lysogorov and presented by Alexey Pajitnov. Game Gear and Sega Genesis versions were planned but never released.

== Gameplay ==
When two snakes of the same color touch they disappear. Sometimes a flashing WildSnake will appear and destroy every snake of the same color it touches. There are also rare uncontrollable purple snakes that destroy everything they touch.

The game include 4 backgrounds and 7 grid types and 2 player mode.

== Reception ==
Reviewing the Game Boy version, GamePro commented that "WildSnake clones the Tetris concept and adds a nifty graphic twist." They particularly praised the multiple gameplay modes and the way the snakes loop and twist to fill open spaces at the bottom of the playing field. They gave the Super NES version a positive reviewing as well, citing the same reasons, though they did remark that the snakes and their patterns are somewhat too small in this version.

Next Generation reviewed the SNES version of the game, rating it three stars out of five, and stated that "WildSnake [...] manages to entertain, if only as a watered-down version of the game that it so desperately strives to beat."
