= Nightmare Cops =

Upcoming video game developed by Newgrounds

- Publisher: Newgrounds
- Programmer: Tom Fulp
- Artists: Jeff "JohnnyUtah" Bandelin; Cory "Spazkid" Beck
- Composer: Chris "Oney" O'Neill
- Platforms: Windows, Xbox
- Genres: Action platforming, beat-'em-up
- Modes: Single-player, Multiplayer

Nightmare Cops is an upcoming 2D platforming brawler video game developed by Tom Fulp and Jeff "JohnnyUtah" Bandelin under Newgrounds. The game takes place in a town overseen by a police force tasked with entering and combating the inhabitants' nightmares. The game has seen an over ten-year long development cycle and has no tentative release date currently set; however, as of 2024, development is more than halfway to completion according to the development team.

== Gameplay ==
Nightmare Cops can be played by up to three players and features a selection of different characters to play as, each with different move sets and abilities. Levels contain platforming segments and boss fights, and are accessible through an overworld in the "real world" which you navigate in the crew's van. Many decorative elements of the overworld map are destructible.

== Development ==
According to Fulp, development on Nightmare Cops began in 2012 with Bandelin alongside the web game project Cathode Raybots. A lip-sync animation system developed for the game was packaged as an interactive Flash called Talk Head and posted to Newgrounds the same year. In 2016, It was announced in a blog post that Cory "Spazkid" Beck and Chris "Oney" O'Neill had joined the project. Details on the game were scarce until a playable demo was showcased in 2017 at San Diego Comic-Con at The Behemoth's booth. In a 2024 interview, Bandelin touched on the project's status: "We're well past the halfway point. It won't be out this year, but hopefully, not long after that."
