= XOR (video game) =

1987 video game

- Developer: Astral Software
- Publisher: Logotron
- Platforms: ZX Spectrum, Commodore 64, Amstrad CPC, Amiga, Atari ST, Acorn Electron, BBC Micro
- Release: 1987
- Genre: Puzzle
- Mode: Single-player

XOR is a puzzle video game created by Astral Software and published by Logotron in 1987 for the Acorn Electron, Amiga, Amstrad CPC, Atari ST, BBC Micro, Commodore 64, and ZX Spectrum.

== Gameplay ==
=== Objective ===
The player controls two shields, Magus and Questor, which can be moved horizontally and vertically though the maze, in order to collect masks. The object of each level is to collect all the masks, then reach the exit. In all levels, use of both shields are required for completion, and in some, one shield must be sacrificed (walled in or destroyed) in order to complete the level.

=== Force fields ===
In the first level, the only obstacles except for the maze walls themselves, are two types of force field: one of which can only be entered from above or below, and a second which can only be entered from left or right. In both cases entering the force field destroys it.

=== Fish and chickens ===
In subsequent levels, fish and chicken objects are introduced. Fish fall downwards whenever possible, while chickens run to the left if not blocked. Both can destroy the player's shields by hitting them from more than one square away (like rocks in Boulder Dash). Fish and chickens can move through force fields if entering from the appropriate direction. It is also possible to push fish left or right, and chickens up and down.

=== Bombs ===
There are two types of bombs in XOR: "V-bombs" ("vertical") and "H-bombs" ("horizontal"). V-bombs move left in the same manner as chickens, while H-bombs (shaped like old-fashioned spherical bombs with a burning fuse) fall downwards like fish. Like fish and chickens, H-bombs can be pushed left and right, and V-bombs can be pushed up or down, by the player's shield.

A bomb explodes when it is hit from more than one square away by a fish, a chicken, or another bomb. The object hitting the bomb is destroyed, along with anything directly above or below a V-bomb, or to the left or to the right of an H-bomb. If one bomb hits another, only the bomb that is hit (the lower or left-hand one) actually detonates.

=== Dolls ===
Unlike fish and chickens, dolls cannot move on their own, although the player's shields can push them around the maze. Once a doll is moving it keeps going until it hits an obstacle. Dolls cannot detonate bombs or pass through force fields.

=== Other objects ===
- Map sections: these reveal the layout of part the maze to the player. Masks are highlighted on the map.
- Frowning masks: these are switches – collecting (or blowing up) one turns off the lighting, causing the maze walls to become invisible, while collecting another turns the lights back on again.
- Teleportation portals (labelled BMUS, for "Beam Me Up Scotty", in some versions): this moves the player's shield to the other teleportation portal within the maze.

== Related releases ==
XOR Designer allowed players to design their own levels. XOR for Schools included six new mazes and a paper planning sheet, intended to be photocopied by teachers.

== Legacy ==
Reception

Award
Publication	Award
Amstrad Action	Mastergame

Unauthorized clones have been released for Windows, Macintosh, Linux, RISC OS, the SAM Coupé, the Game Boy Advance, and Uzebox.
