= Polyhedra Games =

Game publisher

- Founded: 2019; 7 years ago
- Founder: Clipper Arnold (game designer)
- Country of origin: United States
- Headquarters location: Brooklyn, New York
- Publication types: Games, Books, Video Games
- Fiction genres: Role-playing games, Board games, Video Games,
- Official website: polyhedragames.com

Polyhedra Games is a publisher of tabletop role-playing games and video games established by Clipper Arnold in 2019.

Polyhedra's titles include Justice Velocity, a tabletop RPG with vehicular mechanics inspired by action movies and related media such as Bad Boys, Fast & Furious, and Initial D; Nebula Chaos, a sci-fi and space opera ttrpg; The Plagued Crypt of Helvete, a dark fantasy third party adventure for Mörk Borg; Toku Legends, a tokusatsu-inspired RPG featuring art by Corey Lewis; and Tourmaline Valley: Tritonia, a third party Dungeons & Dragons adventure module about a high fantasy touring band.

== About ==
The name "Polyhedra" refers to multi-faceted polyhedral dice typically associated with tabletop RPGs. They have had four successful Kickstarter campaigns for: Justice Velocity, Nebula Chaos, The Plagued Crypt of Helvete, and Toku Legends.

=== Tabletop RPGs ===
Releases
2019	Justice Velocity
2019	Justice Velocity: Quickstart Guide
2020
2021	Tourmaline Valley: Tritonia #1
2022	The Plagued Crypt of Helvete
2023	Nebula Chaos
2023	Headcannon (demo)
2024	Toku Legends

Polyhedra Games was first established around 2019 alongside the Kickstarter campaign for Justice Velocity. Geek Native reported that the publisher was originally based in Los Angeles, and that the Facebook page for Polyhedra Games was changed from "Death City" to "Polyhedra Games" in 2018, with Death City being an as-of-yet unpublished urban fantasy RPG which inspired Justice Velocity's rules.

Of Justice Velocity, Geek Native noted, "It's a 2d6 system that's fairly light on the rules and high on the drama. Players slam octane chips down on the table, once per session, to trigger High Octane Mode and invoke a bonus to a roll. Juice points are spent to activate abilities like Ultimate Drift and Gunslinger. Justice Velocity has rules for vehicles so you can have your action flick of an RPG filled with dramatic car chases."

In an interview with 411Mania in 2019, Arnold mentioned that the name "Justice Velocity" came from an action movie name generator, and that the game was inspired by drinking with friends before seeing Fate of the Furious. In the same interview, he also noted that Justice Velocity's rules were based on Death City's: "When I got home, I scribbled together some notes from another homebrew (Death City) and we had our first session of Justice Velocity a few weeks later."

Polyhedra Games launched another Kickstarter for The Plagued Crypt of Helvete, a third-party Mörk Borg adventure in 2021, which fulfilled in 2022. They also released Tourmaline Valley: Tritonia in 2021, a Dungeons and Dragons adventure module created by Clipper Arnold's brother, Trevor Dean Arnold, about a touring band. Polyhedra subsequently launched Kickstarters for Nebula Chaos and Toku Legends, which were fulfilled and saw release in 2023 and 2024 respectively.

=== Video Games ===
Polyhedra released a demo for a video game called Headcannon in 2023, a game about a robot with a cannon for a head. Polyhedra also collaborated on game jams for a cosmic horror game called Drifter and a mech action-RPG called Project OMEN in 2024. Yahoo Japan noted that Project OMEN looked to be inspired by Pokemon and Megaman Battle Network. Polyhedra also has some association with an indie boomer shooter in development called CYBRLICH & The Death Cult of Labor. Polyhedra Games collaborated on a follow up to Project Omen with a game called Project Omen Arena X Boost, released in August of 2025.

== Releases ==
=== Tabletop RPGs ===
Title	Item #	ISBN	Release date
Justice Velocity	PG001	978-0-578-70855-3	August 2019
Justice Velocity: Quickstart Guide	PG002	―	September 2019
Tourmaline Valley: Tritonia #1	PG003	―	March 2021
The Plagued Crypt of Helvete	PG004	979-8-218-00743-0	October 2022
Justice Velocity Variant Cover	PG001V1	979-8-9864013-0-0	October 2022
Nebula Chaos	PG005	Hardcover: 979-8-9864013-2-4 Softcover: 979-8-9864013-1-7	September 2023
Toku Legends	PG006	―	December 2024

=== Video Games ===
- "Headcannon" demo (2023)
- "Drifter" in collaboration with others for a game jam (2024)
- "Project OMEN" in collaboration with others for a game jam (2024)
- "Project Omen Arena X Boost" in collaboration with others for a game jam (2025)
