= Towdie =

1994 video game

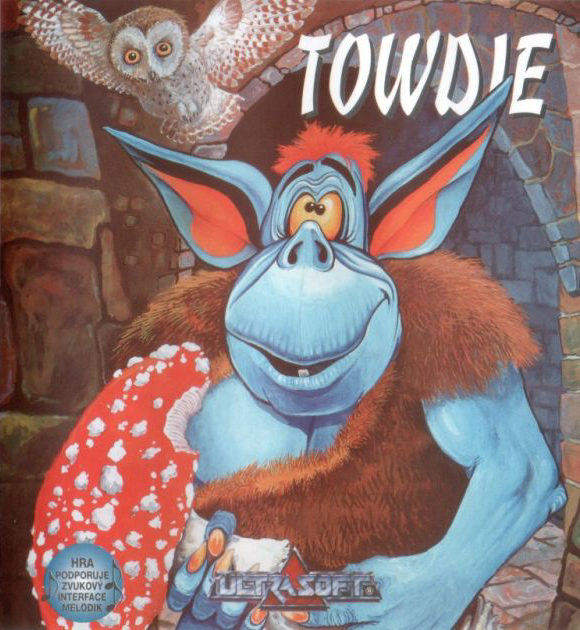
- Developer: DSA Computer Graphix
- Publisher: Ultrasoft
- Designers: Dušan Balara; Ladislav Balara
- Platform: ZX Spectrum
- Release: EU: 1994
- Genres: Adventure game, Platform game
- Mode: Single player

Towdie is a platform adventure game published in Europe in 1994 by Ultrasoft for the ZX Spectrum. The game, similar in style to Dizzy series, is set in a fantasy land called Alkria and follows adventures of a little restless creature called Towdie. The player controls Towdie, the titular character, who is on the mission to save the kingdom of Alkria from the evil dragon Quido.

The game was developed by Balara brothers (DSA Computer Graphix), where Dušan Balara created all the graphics & animation and Ladislav Balara programmed the game engine.

On May 2, 2013, Ultrasoft launched a crowdfunding campaign on Kickstarter to fund an HD remake of this game for Android, iPad, and PC with a funding goal of $50,000. Unfortunately, this campaign failed to reach its target.

== Plot ==
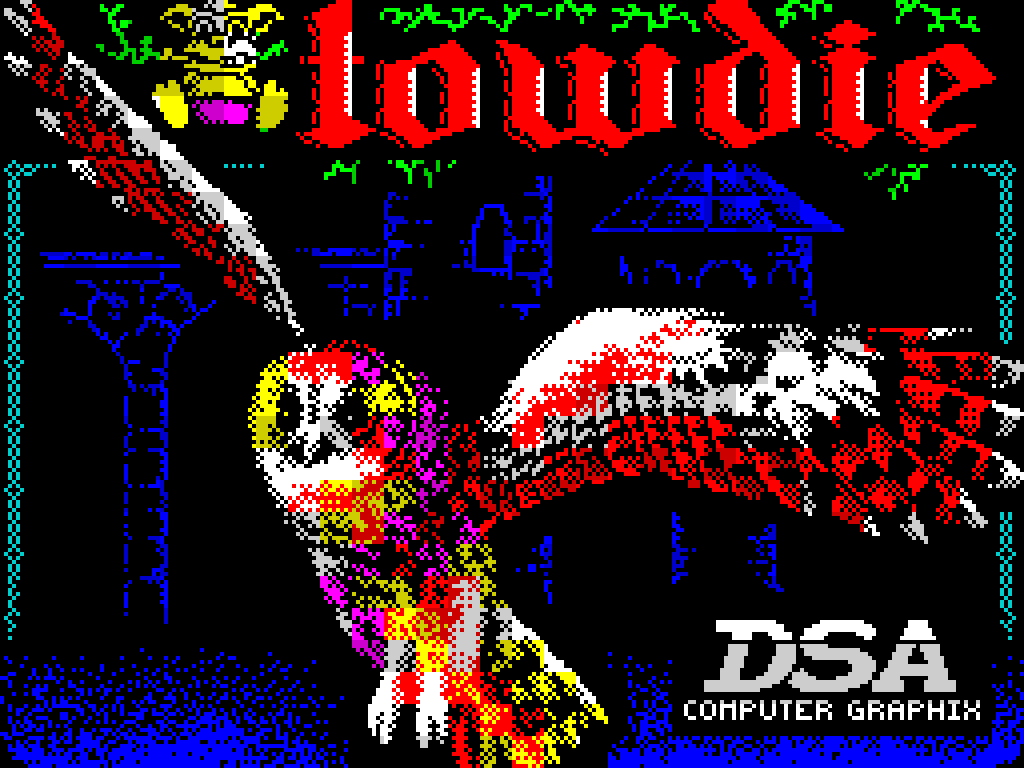
Towdie's title screen, ZX Spectrum version

The inhabitants of the kingdom of Alkria were living their happy and carefree lives, until one day the evil dragon Quido descended on the land, burning everything and everyone with his fire breath. The only hope now rests on an unlikely hero - little Towdie, who must overcome all the obstacles which get into his way on a mission to unite the remaining citizens of the kingdom and, with their help, defeat the dragon Quido.

Throughout the game Towdie meets and interacts with many of Alkria's inhabitants, including a prince and princess, a cook, a smith, an executioner, an evil sorceress, along with various other creatures who can help or hinder Towdie's progress towards his goal.

== Gameplay ==
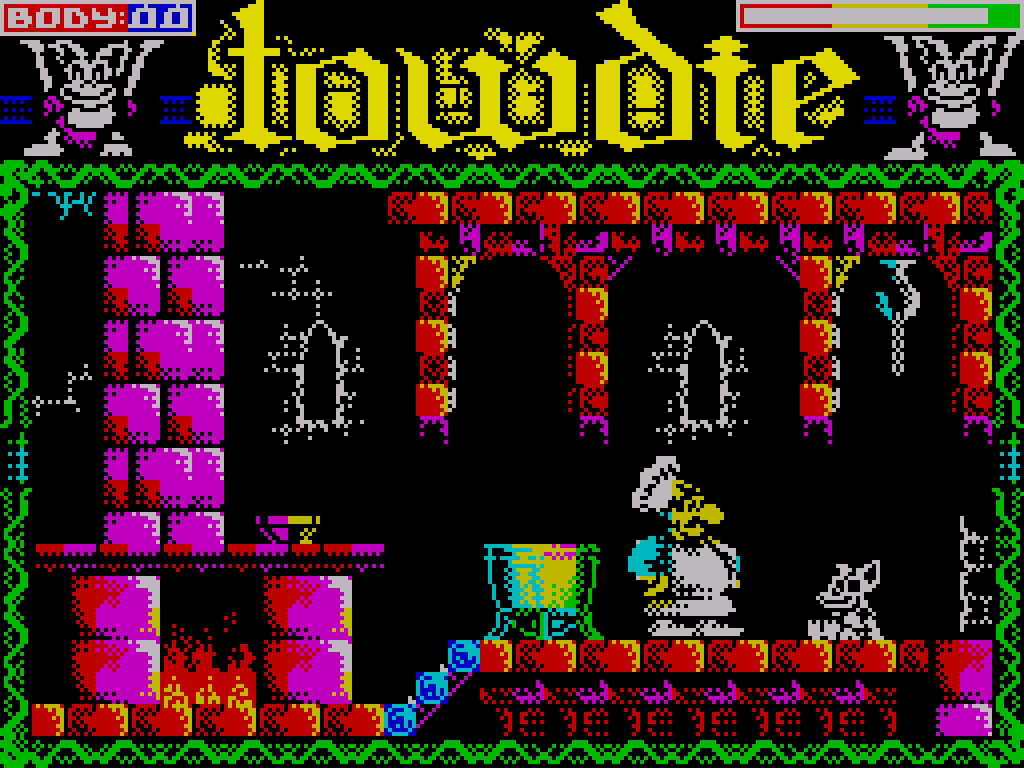
Screenshot of Towdie

The player guides Towdie, a juvenile-troll-like character, through an interior and exterior of a castle in an attempt to save the kingdom of Alkria from the evil dragon Quido. The locations are all situated in or around the castle and are fantastical in nature, many loosely inspired by fairy tales. Movement from one room (screen) to the next is through flip-screen such that when Towdie touches the outer edge of one room (screen) he appears at the beginning of the adjacent room.

The individual rooms consist of platforms, stairs and ropes with Towdie able to both walk and jump to navigate the castle and its obstacles. Towdie can hold up to four items at once which are then used at specific locations to solve puzzles and advance through the game. At the start of the game the player has a full health bar, which goes down in dangerous situations and once depleted the game is over. The health bar can be replenished by finding and eating Amanita mushrooms scattered throughout the castle.
