= ZiMAD =

American game developer and publisher

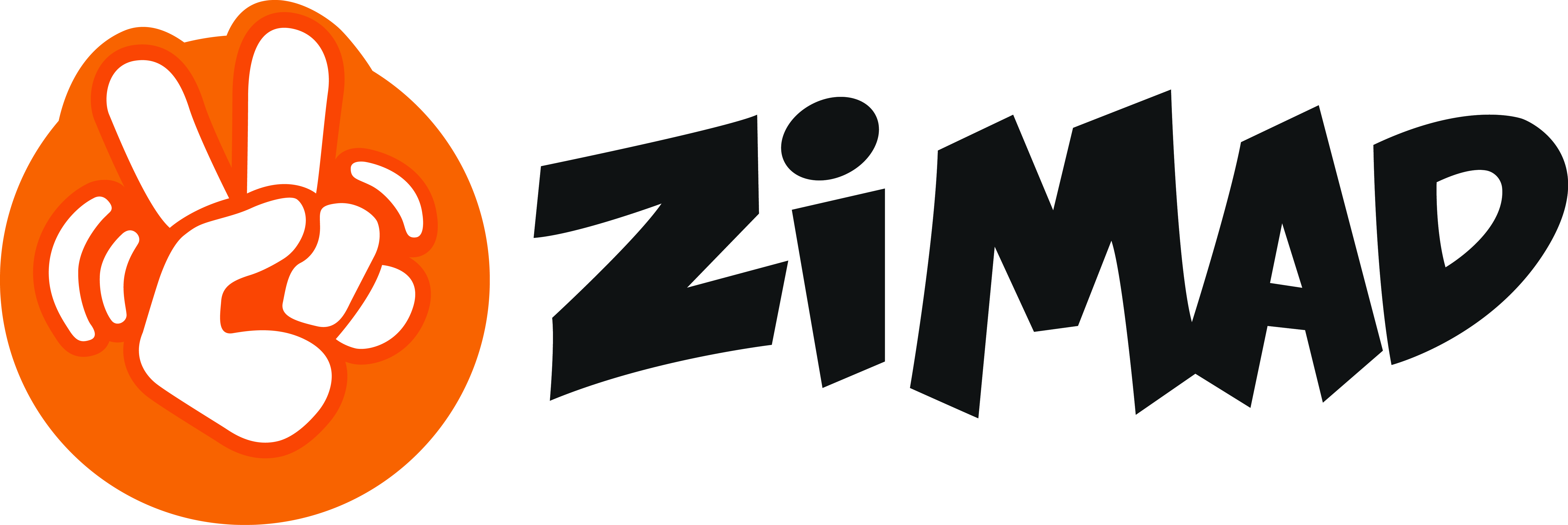
- Type: Private
- Industry: Video game development, Mobile games
- Founded: 2009
- Founders: XIM Group
- Headquarters: Florida, USA
- Area served: Worldwide
- Key people: Dmitry Bobrov (CEO)
- Products: Mobile games, Puzzle games, Board games
- Parent: XIM Group
- Website: https://www.zimad.com

ZiMAD is an American game developer and publisher founded in 2009 in San Francisco, California.

== History ==
In 2009, the XIM group of companies, which develops software in the fields of fintech, aviation, and healthcare, opened XIMAD. It focused on developing games for mobile platforms. The first XIMAD headquarters was located in San Francisco, California. In 2016, the company was renamed to ZiMAD.

In 2011, the mobile puzzle game Magic Jigsaw Puzzles was released globally. As of 2023, the project has over 120 million downloads and partnerships with internationally renowned IPs, including LIFE magazine, Disney, Nickelodeon, Sony Pictures, Cartoon Network, and National Geographic.

Since 2012, ZiMAD has continued to develop the Magic Jigsaw Puzzles project and has released and published other projects such as the Bubble Birds series, My Museum Story, Magic Cross Stitch, and others.

In 2020, ZiMAD focused on developing its M&A direction, within which a board game, Domino Online, was acquired. The acquisition of this project helped the company diversify its portfolio and strengthen its position in the market.

Mobile games became one of the most popular forms of entertainment during the 2020 pandemic, when many people were forced to stay home. ZiMAD noted an increase in downloads and revenue due to this trend. After the pandemic, the company almost entirely switched to the remote work format.

In 2022, due to the growth of the team, ZiMAD opened an office in Serbia to strengthen its presence in the European region and take advantage of more opportunities for business development. Also, in 2021, the company's headquarters moved to Florida.

The experience of operating Magic Jigsaw Puzzles prompted the company to expand the genre diversity of its projects. In 2022, ZiMAD released Jigsaw Puzzle Villa, a mobile puzzle game with narrative elements. The project was launched on Android on September 1 and on iOS on October 28. The game's script was developed by Brunette Games, a US-based studio that develops narratives for a variety of casual studios.

== Games ==
Year	Title	Platform
2011	Magic Jigsaw Puzzles	iOS, Android, Microsoft Store, Amazon, Facebook Platform, App Gallery, Galaxy Apps
2012	Bubble Birds 4	iOS, Android, Microsoft Store
2015	Bubble Birds V	iOS, Android, Amazon
2016	Star Crusade	Steam
2017	My Museum Story	iOS, Android
2019	Magic Cross Stitch	iOS, Android, Amazon
2020	Domino Online	iOS, Android, Amazon
2020	Magic Word	iOS, Android
2021	Magic Color by Number	iOS, Android, Amazon
2022	Magic Diamond Painting	iOS, Android
2022	Puzzle Villa	iOS, Android, Amazon
2023	Art of Puzzles	iOS, Android, Amazon
2024	Domino Rivals	iOS, Android
2024	Spades	iOS, Android, Amazon
