= ALF: The First Adventure =

1987 video game

- Developer: Box Office
- Publisher: Box Office
- Programmers: MS-DOS: Frank Haug; Jon Baller; Commodore 64; Rick Hansen; Loren Hansen; Kevin Scoles
- Platforms: Apple II, Atari ST, Commodore 64, MS-DOS
- Release: 1987: Apple, MS-DOS; 1988: C64; 1989: Atari ST
- Genre: Action
- Mode: Single-player

ALF: The First Adventure is an action game released in 1987 for the Apple II, Atari ST, Commodore 64, and MS-DOS compatible operating systems. It is based on the television series ALF.

== Gameplay ==
ALF is trying to evade Willie Tanner.

All versions of the game start off with a basic introduction into the game itself along with some basic instructions on how to control the ALF character.

As ALF, the player has to run around and collect pizzas and parts for his starship while trying not get caught by Willie Tanner, as Willie will take away all of ALF's possessions, forcing him to start over again. ALF must also grab cats, but ALF must eat a pizza before a cat can be picked up. Getting caught by the dog catcher is an alternative form of "punishment" in the game; only the player's nemesis Willie can release him from the pound. Since Willie is unable to rescue ALF after being locked up the third time, the situation eventually becomes an automatic game over. All versions of the game have a strict time limit to accomplish everything. They also have ALF claiming the player's loss is being blamed "on the alien." Players who make the high score become members of the Honorary Melmac Skleen Club, which consists of the high score list and an in-joke for fans of the television series.

All the maps in the game usually span about an area of either 2x2 or 2x3, totalling four to six screens of action per stage.
