= ATF (video game) =

1988 video game

ATF: Advanced Tactical Fighter
- Developers: Ian Beynon; Neil Coxhead; Kevin J. Bezant
- Publisher: Digital Integration
- Platforms: ZX Spectrum, Commodore 64, Amstrad CPC
- Release: 1988
- Genre: Shoot 'em up
- Mode: Single-player

ATF: Advanced Tactical Fighter is a video game for the ZX Spectrum, Commodore 64, and Amstrad CPC in 1988 by Digital Integration. The player takes control of Lockheed's YF-22A Advanced Tactical Fighter (the aircraft which later became the F-22 Raptor) in a fictional war between two rival factions. The world is a collection of islands randomly generated for each game. The fighter can be armed with a combination of cannon rounds (used to destroy enemy aircraft), ASRAAM missiles, and Maverick missiles for destroying ground targets, even those out of visual range.

== Gameplay ==
ZX Spectrum screenshot

The display is a third-person view showing the player's ATF, which remains stationary on screen as the scenery scrolls past it, which takes up most of the screen. A head-up display is superimposed on the main screen; this shows engine thrust, the ATF's speed, ground height and altitude, along with the missile system available, direction of flight and a target's range and bearing.

The right-hand side is devoted to the "on-board flight computer" which shows enemy positions on a world map, the status of weapon systems and the ATF itself. Above the flight computer display is a panel which shows the score and number of lives left.

Below the main display is a panel which displays status reports, and below that indicators for fuel level, enemy missile lock on, "terrain following" status, "automatic landing" availability (activated when the ATF enters the catchment area surrounding allied bases), and undercarriage status.

The "terrain following RADAR" prevents the ATF from colliding with the ground but reduces the craft's velocity.

== Development ==
When the game was being written, the YF-22A was not even completed (it had its maiden flight on 1990-09-29) and Lockheed were reluctant to divulge any confidential information. Despite this the developers managed to piece together information about the prototype aircraft's "electronic co-pilot" and "automatic terrain following" and decided to concentrate on creating a fast, arcade-like game, with a heavy reliance on strategy, rather than making it technically accurate.

Initially the terrain was created by calculating all the visible points for each frame. This system worked but was far too slow to pass as "arcade action". Instead, a complex co-ordinate referencing system was created, and each frame was drawn into a "dummy" screen, then copied to the display to avoid flicker.

The developers decided that strategy would play a large part in the game, with no compromises being made and that the 'war model' would appear as realistic and natural as possible. Five types of ground forces, as well as sea forces, communications emplacements and factories appear in the game, and all interact with each other in ways that affect gameplay. Factories, for example, supply the military hardware and if destroyed will result in a gradual depletion of forces, since tanks and ships are destroyed but not replaced.

The type of terrain affects the velocity of land forces; driving over snow, for example, is twice as slow as over green land. Each object has a unique strength value, which means that if the player does not succeed in completely destroying a target, allied ground forces may be able to "finish it off".

The code for the Sinclair Spectrum version was written on an IBM AT-compatible computer using a macro assembler. The graphics were designed on an Atari ST, then downloaded onto the IBM AT, before being downloaded to the Spectrum and debugged using a specially developed monitor.

== Reception ==
Reception

Review scores
Publication	Score
Crash	89%
Sinclair User	10/10
Your Sinclair	8/10
Commodore User	8/10
ACE	956/1000

Award
Publication	Award
Amstrad Action	Mastergame

Reviews were overwhelmingly positive, with Your Sinclair and Commodore User rating it at 8/10,CRASH at 89%, ACE giving the game 956/1000 and Sinclair User giving top marks of 10/10.

Your Sinclair's Jonathan Davies wrote, "Flying controls are minimal, leaving your hands free for downing baddies and generally enjoying the flight.", Nathan Jones from CRASH decided that "...the graphics are superb and the landscapes give it a futuristic feel.' and Sinclair User's Chris Jenkins called the game a "rivetting shoot-em-up with some aspects of a simulation".
