= List of TRS-80 Color Computer games =

This list contains video games created for the TRS-80 Color Computer (commonly called the CoCo), part of the TRS-80 family of computers. Many CoCo games are compatible with or easily ported to the Dragon 32, a very similar computer. There are three main models: Color Computer 1, Color Computer 2, and Color Computer 3. Some games are only compatible with a newer model. A few are "hybrid" titles that work on the CoCo 1/2 but if run on a CoCo 3 will take advantage of the 3's greater capabilities.

== List ==
There are 639 commercial games on this list.

Name	Year	Developer	Publisher	Notes
3-D Brickaway / Breakthru	1982	Britt Monk	Avalon Hill	
3-D Ghostmania	1982	Randy S. Johnson	Educational Arcade Systems	
3-D Tic-Tac-Toe	1983	Jim Makowski	Oelrich Publications	
3D Space Wars	1984	Steve Turner and Andrew Braybrook (ST Software)	Hewson Consultants	
7 Card Stud	1984		Tandy Corporation	
8-Ball	1983	Charles J. Roslund and Bruce M. Cook	Anteco Software	
A Mazing World of Malcom Mortar	1987	Greg L. Zumwalt & Mark W. Easter (ZCT Systems Group) for Gamestar	Tandy Corporation	
Across the Rubicon	1982	Phil Keller	Ark Royal Games	
Advanced Star Trench Warfare	1982	Fred B. Scerbo	Illustrated Memory Banks	
Adventure #1: Adventureland	1983	Scott Adams (original game), Roger Schrag (Coco port)	Adventure International	
Adventure #2: Pirate Adventure	1983	Scott Adams & Alexis Adams (original game), Roger Schrag (Coco port)	Adventure International	
Adventure #3: Secret Mission	1983	Scott Adams (original game), Roger Schrag (Coco port)	Adventure International	
Adventure #4: Voodoo Castle	1983	Alexis Adams (original game design) & Scott Adams (original programming), Roger Schrag (Coco port)	Adventure International	
Adventure #5: The Count	1983	Scott Adams (original game), Roger Schrag (Coco port)	Adventure International	
Adventure #6: Strange Odyssey	1983	Scott Adams (original game), Roger Schrag (Coco port)	Adventure International	
Adventure #7: Mystery Fun House	1983	Scott Adams (original game), Roger Schrag (Coco port)	Adventure International	
Adventure #8: Pyramid of Doom	1983	Alvin Shaw & Scott Adams (original game), Roger Schrag (Coco port)	Adventure International	
Adventure #9: Ghost Town	1983	Scott Adams (original game), Roger Schrag (Coco port)	Adventure International	
Adventure #10: Savage Island Part I	1983	Scott Adams (original game), Roger Schrag (Coco port)	Adventure International	
Adventure #11: Savage Island Part II	1983	Scott Adams & Rus Wetmore (original game), Roger Schrag (Coco port)	Adventure International	
Adventure #12: Golden Voyage	1983	William Demas & Scott Adams (original game), Roger Schrag (Coco port)	Adventure International	
Adventure #13: The Sorcerer of Claymorgue	1983	Scott Adams (original game), Roger Schrag (Coco port)	Adventure International	
Adventure In Mythology	1986	Scott Cabit	Saguaro Software	
Adventure in Wonderland	1983	Bill Sethares	Prickly Pear Software	
Adventure Trilogy	1981	Kevin Herrboldt and Tim Nelson	Nelson Software Systems	
Aerial Attack	1983	John Nakoski	Challenge Software	
Air Traffic Controller	1983	John Fraysse	Tom Mix Software	
Airball	1987	Edward Scio	Microdeal	
Airline	1983	Roger Schrag (original Atari 400/800 version by George Schwenk)	Adventure International	
Alcatraz II	1981	Michael (Mike) R. Hughey	Spectral Associates	
Aldaron	1984	Jeffrey Dwight	Jade Products	
Alpha Search	1983		Spectral Associates	
Androne	1983	Robert Arnstein	Tandy Corporation	
Apples	1982	Bob Crispen	Computerware	
Arex	1983	Roger Schrag (original TRS-80 Model I/III version by William Muk)	Adventure International	
Arkanoid	1989	Taito	Tandy Corporation	Hybrid title. Works on CoCo 1/2 but best on CoCo 3.
Armchair Admiral	1987	Judith A. Emge	Eversoft Games	
Artillery Duel	1981		Spectral Associates	
Astro-Blast	1982	Ron Krebs	Mark Data Products	
Athletyx	1985	Ken Kalish	Microdeal	
Atom	1983	Designed by Mark Siegel, programmed by Gary Sullivan	Tandy Corporation	
Audio Spectrum Analyzer	1981	Steve Bjork	Tandy Corporation	
Avenger	1982		The Cornsoft Group	
B.C. Bill	1984	Creative Technology Group	Imagine Software	
Back-Track	1984	C.M. Andrew	Incentive Software Ltd.	
Backgammon	1980	Tandy Corporation	Tandy Corporation	
Bagasaurus	1983		Tandy Corporation	
Bagitman	1983	Mike Roberts	Aardvark-80	
Balldozer	1988	Stewart Orchard	Kouga Software	
Ballyhoo	1986	Infocom	Infocom	
Barbarossa	1985	Phil Keller	Ark Royal Games	
Bash	1989	Steve Bjork	SRB Software and Game Point Software	
Battle for Tunis	1984	Carl Carpenter	Ark Royal Games	
Battle Hymn - The Battle of Gettysburg	1986	Phil Keller	Ark Royal Games	
Battle of Gettysburg	1982	James Woodruff	Softwride	
Battle of the Bulge	1984	Carl Carpenter	Ark Royal Games	
Battle Stations	1984	Eric White & Scott Smith (Whitesmith Partnership)	Novasoft	
Battlefleet	1981	Bob Sleath	Spectral Associates	
Beam	1984	Warren Ulrich III (?)	Computerware	
Beam Rider	1984	D&D Software	Microdeal	
Beanstalker	1986	Roy Coates	Micro Vision	
Bedlam	1982	Robert Arnstein	Tandy Corporation	
Berserk	1981	Ron Krebs	Mark Data Products	
Beyond the Cimeeon Moon	1982	Kevin Herrboldt and Tim Nelson	Nelson Software Systems	
Bingo Math	1980		Tandy Corporation	
Biosphere	1985	Greg Zumwalt (Initial design by Mark Siegel)	Tandy Corporation	
Birds	1982	Andrew Hubbell	Tom Mix Software	originally called Bird Attack
Blackbeard's Island	1984	Greg Miller, design by Eric Nelson, art by Pamela Dawn Miller	Novasoft	
Blackjack	1983	Steve Kincade	Kincade Computer Software	
Blackjack Royale	1983	J. Michael Nowicki	JMN	
Blochead	1983	B.J. Chambless	Computerware	
Body (Bawdy) Parts	1982	Bruce M. Cook	Elite Software	
Bomber Command	1983	David W. Cochrane & Phillip E. Keller	Ark Royal Games	
Boris the Bold	1984	N. Dyson	Blaby Computer Games	
Bouncing Boulders	1986		Diecom Products	
Brewmaster	1984		Novasoft	
Bridge Tutor	1982	Kevin O'Connell (Philidor Software)	Tandy Corporation	
Bugs II	1984	Dave Shewchun and Roland Knight	Four Star Software	
Bumble Games	1983	Leslie M. Grimm & Ron Mummaw	The Learning Company	
Bumble Plot	1983	Leslie M. Grimm & Ron Mummaw	The Learning Company	
Bumpers	1985	Charles Wallace	Microdeal	Maze game for one or two players.
Buried Buxx	1988	Jeff Robinson	JR and JR Softstuff	
Bust Out	1980	Tandy Corporation	Tandy Corporation	Clone of Breakout
Butterfly Patrol	1983	Ann Reeves	Spectral Associates	
Buzzard Bait	1984	Tom Mix Software	Tom Mix Software	Joust clone.
Buzzworm	1984	Lee Earle	Novasoft	
C-Trek	1981	Gene Turnbow	Spectral Associates	
Caladuril: Flame of Light	1987	Dave Triggerson and Jeff Noyle	Diecom Products	
Calixto Island (Graphic version)	1983	Stephen O'Dea, Bob Withers (based on original text adventure version by Ron Krebs)	Mark Data Products	
Calixto Island (Text version)	1981	Ron Krebs	Mark Data Products	
Candy Co.	1984	David W. Clark, sound by Bob Miller	Intracolor	
Canyon Climber	1982	Steve Bjork, James Garon	Tandy Corporation	
Card Games	1982	James Garon (Datasoft)	Tandy Corporation	
Cashman	1983	Bill Dunlevy, Doug Frayer	Computer Shack	
Castle Guard	1983		Tandy Corporation	
Catacomb	1983	Roger Smith	Oregon Color Computer Systems	
Catalyst	1983	J. Weaver Jr. (Factory Programming), game concept by Paul Howe	Computer Shack	
Catch 'Em	1982	Dave Edson	Aardvark-80	
Caterpillar	1982	Dave Edson	Aardvark-80	
Cave Fighter	1983		Cable Software	
Cave Hunter	1981	Ron Krebs	Mark Data Products	
Cave Walker	1986		Tandy Corporation	
CC-Thello	1982		Spectral Associates	
Chambers	1984	John Crane	Microdeal	
Champion	1986	Glen R. Dahlgren	Sundog Systems	
Chatwin Manor	1986	Bob Horne	Goldsoft/Coco Oz	
Checker King	1980	Michael Marks & Peter Jennings (Personal Software Inc.)	Tandy Corporation	
Checkers	1984	Radio Shack	Radio Shack	
Chess	1986	Roger S. Young	Applied Machine Intelligence	
ChessD	1983		Computer Systems Distributors	
Chopper Rescue	1982	Rob Shaw	Prism Software	
Chopper Strike	1983	John Crane	Computer Shack	
Chuckie Egg	1983	Mike Webb (Coco port by Stephen J. Woolham). Original design (Spectrum) by Nigel Alderton.	A & F Software	
CINCPAC - Battle of Midway	1984	Steve Barry	Ark Royal Games	
City Bomber	1987	Tio Babich	Saint John Gallery	
City War	1985	Dan Tharp & Toby Skaar	Prickly Pear Software	
Classic Solitaire	1990	Ken Drewry and Judith A. Emge	Eversoft Games	
Clowns and Balloons	1982	Steve Bjork	Datasoft	Circus clone
Coco Crosswords	1985	Lee Earle	Novasoft	
Color Baseball	1982	Dale Lear	Tandy Corporation	
Color Blast	1983	John Nakoski	Color Software	
Color Bowl Football	1983	Dave Kincaid	Computerware	
Color Car Action	1984	Dave Dies	Novasoft	
Color Caterpillar	1983	Robert Lech & Troy Dahlman (The Rugby Circle)	Soft Sector Marketing Inc.	
Color Computer Clue	1982	Larry Greenfield (John Kowalski - VDG emulator)	LDG Free Software	
Color Cubes	1981	Robert G. Kilgus	Tandy Corporation	Puzzle game similar to Rubik's Cube.
Color Golf III	1982	Jay Hoppe	Tom Mix Software	
Color Invaders	1981		Computerware	
Color Modem Chess	1982	Larry F. Perry	Double Density Software	
Color Panic	1983	Tom D. & Brett N. Keeton	Spectral Associates	
Color Robot Battle	1981	The Image Producers	Radio Shack	Exclusive to the Color Computer.
Color Space Invaders	1981		Spectral Associates	
Color Space Traders	1981	Tom D. & Brett N. Keeton	Spectral Associates	
Color Zap	1982	James Yee	Spectral Associates	Some ads in 1983 for The Program Store in various Coco magazines says the author is Frank Smith.
Color-Trek	1982		Computerware	
Colorout	1981		Spectral Associates	
Colorpede	1982	David W. Clark, sound by Bob Miller	Intracolor	
Company Commander	1984	Phil Keller	Ark Royal Games	
Conflict	1981	M. Shanto & S. Loy	Soft Sector Marketing	
Conquering Armies	1983	Steven C. Mitchell	Mitchell Software	
The Contras	1993	Doug Masten, Jeff Steidl	Sundog Systems	CoCo 3-only Contra clone. Originally intended to be released in 1991.
Cosmic Clones	1983	Robert Shaw	Mark Data Products	
Cosmic Cruiser	1984	Simon Bell (idea by D.H. Lawson, graphics by Steve Cain, music by Fred Gray)	Imagine Software Ltd.	
Cosmic Crusader	1984	David K. Pridmore	Blaby Computer Games	
Cosmic Superbowl	1982	Tom D. Keeton	Spectral Associates	
Crash	1984	Michel & Rejean Desjardins	Tom Mix Software	
Crazy Painter	1983	Charles Guy	Cornsoft Group	
Creature Feature	1983	John Nakoski	Challenge Software	
Cricket	1984	Tim Love (modified for disk by Phillip Thomas)	Peaksoft	
Croid	1981	Terry Greyzck	Spectral Associates	
Crosswords	1981	Tandy Corporation	Tandy Corporation	
Crystal Revenge	1982	Tom Roginski	Owl-ware	
Crystle Castles	1984		Thundervision	
Cuber	1983	Mark Skala	Tom Mix Software	
Cubix	1983	Daron Stinnett	Spectral Associates	
Curse of Crowley Manor	1983	Jyym Pearson and Norman Mailer	Adventure International	
Cuthbert Goes Digging	1982	Steve Bak	Microdeal	Space Panic clone starring Microdeal's mascot character Cuthbert.
Cuthbert Goes Walkabout	1983	Tom Mix Software	Microdeal	
Cuthbert in Space	1984	Microdeal	Microdeal	Platform game
Cuthbert in the Cooler	1985	Richard Phillips	Microdeal	
Cuthbert in the Mines	1984	Microdeal	Microdeal	Gameplay is similar to Frogger.
Cyber Tank	1986	Ottmar Bochardt	Mark Data Products	
Cyborg Wars	1982	Paul Sumida	Bumblebee Software	
Cyclops	1983	Alan Gray	Romik Software Ltd.	
Cyrus	1982	Richard Lang (Intelligent Software)	Tandy Corporation	
Dancing Devil	1982	Chris Latham	Tom Mix Software	
Danger Ranger	1984	Ken Kalish	Microdeal	Platform game.
Dark Castle Game System	1982	David Lionell Dawson	David Lionell Dawson	
Dark Star	1984	Design Design	Design Design	
Darkmoor Hold	1985	Glen R. Dahlgren	Prickly Pear Software	
Death Ship	1981	Rodger Olsen	Aardvark-80	
Death Trap	1982	Robert Lech & Troy Dahlman (The Rugby Circle Inc.)	The Rugby Circle Inc.	
Decathlon	1984	Richard Borsheim	Spectral Associates	
Decipher	1983	Loren Seng	Prickly Pear Software	
Defense	1982		Spectral Associates	
Demolition Derby	1984	John Gabbard (Spectral Associates)	Tandy Corporation	
Demon Attack	1984	M. Voorsanger (Imagic)	Tandy Corporation	
Demon Seed	1984	Jeffrey Sorensen, Philip MacKenzie	Microdeal	Phoenix clone.
Desert Golf	1983	John Zivic	Spectral Associates	
Desert Patrol	1983	M.G. Lustig	Arcade Animation Inc.	
Desert Rider	1984	Steve Bjork (Color America User Group & SRB Software)	Tandy Corporation	
Devil Assault	1984	Ken Kalish	Microdeal	Demon Attack clone.
Devious	1984	Ryan Olsen	Spectral Associates	
Diamond in the Rough	1989		JR & JR Softstuff	
Dino Wars	1980	Robert Kilgus	Radio Shack	Fighting game between two dinosaurs.
Donald Duck's Playground	1987	Sierra On-Line	Sierra On-Line	
Donkey King	1982	Chris Latham	Tom Mix Software	Donkey Kong clone. Renamed The King. Only home version w/ all 4 levels.
Donpan	1985		Tandy Corporation	
Donut Dilemma	1986	Nick Marentes	Tandy Corporation	
Doodle Bug	1982	David Crandall	Computerware	
Doubleback	1983	Dale Lear	Tandy Corporation	
Downland	1983	Michael Aichlmayr	Spectral Associates	
Dr. Who	1985	Larry Lansberry	Prickly Pear Software	
Draconian	1984	Mike Hughey	Microdeal	Shoot 'em up. Exclusive to the Color Computer. Clone/derivative of Bosconian.
Dragon Slayer	1984	Olaf Schroeder	Tom Mix Software	
Dragon's Temple	1986		Jade Software	
Dragonblade	1986	Glen R. Dahlgren	Prickly Pear Software	
Dragonfire	1984	Imagic	Imagic	
Mega-Bug	1982	Steve Bjork	Tandy Corporation	
Dungeon of Death	1983	Dave Frederiksen	Aardvark-80	
Dungeon Quest	1985	Steve Seiden	Computerware	
Dungeon Raid	1984	Ken Kalish	Microdeal	Vertically scrolling shooter.
Dungeons of Daggorath	1983	DynaMicro	Tandy Corporation	
Castle of Tharoggad	1988	Scott Cabit	Tandy Corporation	Requires the Color Computer 3. Sequel to Dungeons of Daggorath.
Dunkey Munkey	1982	Harvey Brofman	Intellectronics	
Duo Deck Solitaire	1991	Judith A. Emge & Ken Drewry	Eversoft Games	
Eagle	1984	Art Martin	Saguaro Software	
Early Games	1983	Springboard Software	Counterpoint Software	
Earthquake - San Francisco 1906	1983	Jymm Pearson and Norman Sailer	Adventure International	
Eastworld Karate	1987		The Saint John Gallery	
El Bandito	1982	David Crandall	Creative Computing Software	
El Diablero	1982	Ken Kalish	Computerware	
Electron	1984	Steve Gieseking	Tom Mix Software	A minigame collection. Clone of Tron.
Eliminator	1983	Britt Monk	Adventure International	
Empire	1984		Shards Software	
Enchanted Forest	1982		Genesis Software	
Enchanter	1984	Infocom	Infocom	
Eno	1982	Paul Austin & Leroy C. Smith (PAL Creations)	JARB Software	
Erland	1984	Tim Bremser and Lloyd Pulley	Prickly Pear Software	
Escape	1982	Ken Kalish	Color Software	
Escape 2012	1985		Computerware	
Escape from S.P.E.C.T.R.E.	1983		Tom Mix Software	
Escape from Traam	1981	Jyym Pearson	Adventure International	Third game in the Other-Venture series.
Espionage Island	1983		Owls Nest Software	
Euchre	1983		Chroma-Systems Group	
Exeter	1988	G.J. Doak	Blaxland Computer Services Pty Ltd. (Australia)	
Eye-Witness	1981	R.A. Seaberg	Spectral Associates	
F-16 Assault	1986	Kevin Hoare	Diecom Products	
Facemaker	1984		Tandy Corporation	
Fangman	1984	David Crandall	Tom Mix Software	
Fembots Revenge	1983		Nelson Software Systems	
Feuer & Gasse	1985		Picosoft Games	
Fighter Pilot	1985	Dave Dies	Saguaro Software	
Fire Force	1986	Dave Gibbons, music by Chris Jolly (using his AMS "Advanced Music System" software)	Quickbeam Software	
Fire One	1987	Phil Keller	Ark Royal Games	
Firecopter	1983	Dale Lear	Adventure International	
Flight	1983	Dave Hooper and Mark Barnes	Prickly Pear Software	
Flight Simulator I	1984	Greg Zumwalt	Tandy Corporation	
Flight Simulator II	1988	Bruce Artwick	Sublogic	Requires the Color Computer 3.
Flipper	1982	Mario Zamora	Color Software	
Flying Tigers	1984	Don Rider	Sugar Software	
Foodwar	1983	M.G. Lustig	Arcade Animation Inc.	
Football	1980	Device Oriented Games (likely by Robert A. Arnstein)	Tandy Corporation	
FourCube	1986	David Bush	Novasoft	
Fraction Fever	1984		Tandy Corporation	
Franchise!	1985	Steve Hartford	Computerware	
Frog Trek	1982	George Bahr	Oelrich Publications	
Frogger	1983	Sega	Microdeal	Full title: The Official Frogger by Sega.
Fruit Multi-Bars Slot Machine	1986		Tom Mix Software	
Fury	1983	Timothy Purves	Computer Shack	
Fyr-Draca	1983	David Lionell Dawson	Colorquest	
Galactic Attack	1982	Lou Haehn (The Image Producers)	Tandy Corporation	
Galactic Fighter	1984	Kevin Hoare	Four Star Software	
Galactic Hangman	1983	Stephan Costanzo	Sugar Software	
Galactic Taipan	1983	David W. Cochrane	Strictly Color Software	
Galagon	1984	Brett Keeton	Spectral Associates	
Galax Attax	1984	TDK	Microdeal	Galaxian clone.
Gangbusters	1982		Prickly Pear Software	
Gantelet	1986	Dave Dies	Diecom Products	
Gantelet II	1988	Roland Knight, level design and graphics by Dave Dies	Diecom Products	
Gates of Delirium	1987	Roland Knight, Dave Shewchun, Dave Dies	Diecom Products	
Gazon	1983	David A. Sweet	K&K Computerware	
Gems	1991	John R. Strong	Strongware	
GFL Championship Football II	1988	Greg Zumwalt & Mark Easter (ZCT Systems Group) for Gamestar	Tandy Corporation	
Ghana Bwana	1984	Steve Bjork (SRB Software) (Initial design by Mark Siegel)	Tandy Corporation	
Ghost Gobbler	1982		Spectral Associates	
Gin Champion	1983		Tandy Corporation	
Glaxxons	1983	Russell Peterson	Mark Data Products	
Gold Finder	1986	Troy Motz	Tom Mix Software	
Gold Runner	1984	Dave Dies	Novasoft	
Gold Runner II	1986	Dave Dies	Novasoft	
Golf	1982	Craig Edelheit	Aardvark-80	
Gomoku and Renju	1982	Intelligent Software	Tandy Corporation	
Grabber	1983	Mike Hughey	Tom Mix Software	
Grand Prix	1984	David W. Clark, sound by Bob Miller	Intracolor	
Grand Prix Challenge	1987	Dave Dies	Diecom Products	
Grand Slam Bridge	1983		Greentree Software	
Graphic Mars	1984	Roderick Smith (based on original text version by Rodger Olsen)	Aardvark-80	
Graphic Pyramid	1984	Roderick Smith & Michael Roberts (based on original text version by Rodger Olsen)	Aardvark-80	
Gravitor	1983	L. Dos Santos	Prickly Pear Software	
Gray Lady	1984	Terry A. Steen	Jarb Software	
Greymoon	1983	Bill Dunlevy	Computer Shack	
Gridiron Strategy	1988	Jim Nunke	Sportsware	
Grover's Number Rover	1983	Lee Chapel	Children's Computer Workshop	
Guadal Canal	1983	Phil Keeler	Ark Royal Games	
Guardian	1983	David Joiner	Quasar Animations	
Guess The Animal	1983	Bruce M. Cook	Elite Software	
Hall of the King	1985	Glen R. Dahlgren	Prickly Pear Software	
Hall of the King II: The Inner Chambers	1986	Glen R. Dahlgren	Prickly Pear Software	
Hall of the King III: The Earthstone Revealed	1987	Glen R. Dahlgren	Prickly Pear Software	
Haunted House (Aardvark)	1982	Bob Anderson	Aardvark-80	
Horace Goes Skiing	1983	D. Jeans for Psion Software	Beam Software	
Hornets	1983	John Morrison	J. Morrison (Micros)	
Hotslot	1985	Jack and Pegi Tindle	Moreton Bay Software	
Hungry Horace	1983	D. Jansen	Beam Software	
Hyper Zone	1983	M.G. Lustig	Computerware	
Ice Hockey	1983	Lou Fiorino	Intellectronics	
Ice Master	1983	M.G. Lustig	Arcade Animation Inc.	
Inspector CLUEseau	1983		Petrocci Freelance Associates	
Intercept 4	1984	J. Weaver Jr. and John L. Stahl (Factory Programming)	Computer Shack	
Intergalactic Force	1984	CJ Roslund	Microdeal	Also known as The Force.
Invaders Revenge	1984	Kenneth Kalish	Med Systems Software	
Invasion	1982		Creative Computing Software	
Iron Forest	1988	Dave Dies (Graphics by Kevin Hoare)	Diecom Products	
Journey To Mt. Doom	1983	Lee Chapel	Tom Mix Software	
Jumbo Jet (aka 747C Flight Simulator)	1985	Steve Skrzyniarz and Ken Bragg	Prickly Pear Software	
Jungle	1983		Prickly Pear Software	
Junior's Revenge	1983		Computerware	
Juno	1985		Federal Hill Software	
Kamikaze	1983	Phil Keller	Ark Royal Games	
Karate	1985	Dave Dies	Diecom Products	
Katerpillar 2	Unknown	Rugby Circle	Tom Mix Software	Centipede clone.
Katerpillar Attack	1982	R & S Krotz	Tom Mix Software	
Keys Of The Wizard	1982	John Gabbard	Spectral Associates	
Kids on Keys	1983	Spinnaker Software	Spinnaker Software	
Killerbot	1982	Rodger Olsen	Aardvark-80	
Kindercomp	1984		Tandy Corporation	
King Cuthbert	1984	Ken Kalish	Microdeal	Donkey Kong clone.
King Tut	1984	Microdeal	Microdeal	
King's Quest III	1988	Sierra On-Line	Sierra On-Line	Requires the Color Computer 3.
Klendathu	1983	Leo Christopherson	Tandy Corporation	
Klondike	1982	R.A. Seaberg	Spectral Associates	
Knock Out	1985	Dave Dies	Diecom Products	
Komet Kaze	1983	Thomas Czarnecki	ColorQuest	
Koronis Rift	1987	Lucasfilm Games	Epyx	
Kosmic Kamikaze	1981	Fred Scerbo	Illustrated Memory Banks	
Kron	1983	Rodger Smith	Oregon Color Computer Systems	
Kung-Fu Dude	1987	Glen R. Dahlgren	Sundog Systems	
Kyum-Gai:To Be Ninja	1989	Glen Dahlgren (RS-DOS version), and Glen Dahlgren/Kevin Darling/Eddie Kuns (OS-9 Version)	Sundog Systems	
La Belle Lucie Solitaire	1990	Judith A. Emge and Ken Drewry	Eversoft Games	
Labyrinth	1982	Gerald Werner	Aardvark-80	
Lancer	1983	Rick Lamont	Spectral Associates	
Lansford Mansion	1987	Dave Shewchun and Roland Knight (graphics by Kevin Hoare)	Diecom Products	
Laser Attack	1981	Tom Rosenbaum	Spectral Associates	later Laser Command
Laser Star and Helo Battle	1982	Joe Bennett	Jarb Software	
Laser Tank Duel	1982	Larry Bank	Renaissance Game Designs	
Le Mans	1982	Rick Lamont	Spectral Associates	
Leisure Suit Larry in the Land of the Lounge Lizards	1988	Sierra On-Line	Sierra On-Line	Requires the Color Computer 3.
Lokar's Magic Staff	1982		Real Software	
Lost City, U.S.A.	1983		Software Unlimited	
Lothar's Labyrinth	1981	Tom Rosenbaum	Spectral Associates	
Lucifer's Kingdom	1988	David C. Bowler	Orange Software	
Lunar Lander	1981	Greg Zumwalt	American Small Business Computers	
Lunar-Rover Patrol	1983	Tom D. Keeton and Brett N. Keeton	Spectral Associates	
Lunchtime	1986	Claude R. Gagnon	Novasoft	
Madam Rosa's Massage Parlor	1982	Bob Krotts (Coco version by James Nunke)	Softcore Software Company	
Madness and the Minotaur	1981	Spectral Associates	Radio Shack	
Magic Spells	1983	Leslie M. Grimm & Ron Mummaw	The Learning Company	
Major Istar - Under the Doomed Sea	1984	B.J. Chambless	Computerware	
Marble Maze	1985	Dave Dies	Diecom Products	
Mars/Mars II	1981	Rodger Olsen	Aardvark-80	
Martian Crypt	1985	Scott Cabit (music by Ryan Sambrook)	Novasoft	
Maze Escape	1983	David Figge	Spectral Associates	
Maze Race	1982	Andrew Hubbell	Tom Mix Software	
Medieval Madness	1988	Dave Dies (Graphics by Lori Dies)	Diecom Products	
Megapede	1983	Mark Skala	Computerware	
Mercenary Force	1982		GOSUB International	
Meteoroids	1981		Spectral Associates	
Mickey's Space Adventure	1986	Sierra On-Line	Sierra On-Line	
Microbes	1982		Tandy Corporation	
Microchess	1980	Peter R. Jennings	Personal Software	
Middle Kingdom	1984		Computerware	
Midway Campaign	1983	Avalon Hill	Microcomputer Games	
Mind-Roll	1989	Jesse Taylor (tested by Erik Flom and Scott Duckett) (Epyx Software). Original version by Thalamus, Ltd., 1987-1988, also called Quedex.	Tandy Corporation	
Mine Rescue	1988	Steve Bjork (SRB Software)	Game Point Software	
Miss Gobbler	1983		Spectral Associates	
Mission Impossible	1982	Scott Adams (original 1979 version for other computers)/Roger Schrag (Coco conversion)	Adventure International	
Mission:Empire!	1982	David W. Cochrane	Strictly Color Software	
Moneyopoly	1984	Claude R. Gagnon	Novasoft	
Monkey Kong	1982	Ken Kalish	Med Systems	
Monster Maze	1982		Tandy Corporation	
Monsters & Magic	1983		Prickly Pear Software	
Moon Flight	1983	Paul Griffiths	Cload Publications Inc.	
Moon Hopper	1983	M.G. Lustig	Computerware	
Moon Lander/Moon Lander II	1982	Chris Latham	Tom Mix Software	
Moon Shuttle	1983	Gerry Humphrey and James Garon	Datasoft	
Moptown Hotel	1983	Leslie M. Grimm & Ron Mummaw	The Learning Company	
Moptown Parade	1983	Leslie M. Grimm & Ron Mummaw	The Learning Company	
Morocco GP	1983	M.G. Lustig	Computerware	
Mountain Pilot	1982		Instant Software, Inc.	
Mr. Dig	1984	Microdeal	Microdeal	
Ms. Maze	1984		Tom Mix Software	
Mudpies	1983	Jeff Sorenson and Philip McKenzie	Computer Shack	
Nerble Force	1983	David Crandall	Computerware	
Neutroid II	1984	Nick Marentes	Tom Mix Software	
Nibbler	1982	Tom Czarnecki (Colorful Software)	Nelson Software Systems	
Ninja Warrior	1983	Charles Forsythe	The Programmer's Guild	
Nova Pinball	1982		Bumblebee Software.	
Nuclear Submarine Adventure	1981	Robert J. (Bob) Retelle (plotted by Bob Retelle, Rodger Olsen, and ???)	Aardvark-80	
Offender	1982	Greg Zumwalt	American Small Business Computers	
One on One: Dr. J vs. Larry Bird	1985	Electronic Arts	Electronic Arts	
Operation Safras (Pettigrew II)	1983	Shards Software	Shards Software	Text adventure. Sequel to Pettigrew's Diary.
Orbitron	1982	David Crandall	Creative Computing Software	
Outhouse	1983	J. Weaver Jr. (Factory Programming) and Larry Ashmun (uncredited)	Computer Shack	
Oxxo	1982		Star Kits	
P-51 Mustang Attack Flight Simulator	1984	Brian Bruderer	Tom Mix Software	
Pac Droids	1982	Charles Forsythe	The Programmer's Guild	
Pac-Tac	1981	B.J. Chambless	Computerware	
Pac-Tac II	1983		Computerware	
Pack Maze	1982	David Crandall	DSL Computer Products	
Packetman	1981	Greg Zumwalt	American Small Business Computers	
Panic Button	1983	Paul Kanevsky	First Star Software	
Panzers East!	1985	Avalon Hill	Avalon Hill	Tape also included Commodore 64 and TRS-80 Model I/III/4 versions.
Paper Route	1985	Dave Dies	Diecom Products	
Pegasus and the Phantom Riders	1984	David Figge (Spectral Associates)	Tandy Corporation	
Pengon	1983	Markus Foti (Megasoft)	Spectral Associates	
Pettigrew's Diary	1984	Shards Software	Shards Software	
Phantom Slayer	1984	Ken Kalish	Microdeal	
Photon	1991	Jeff Steidl (Produced by Glen Dahlgren)	Sundog Systems	
Pick Which	1982	Dale Lear	Spectral Associates	
Piggy	1982	Phil Edwardson	Spectral Associates	
Pinball (Anteco)	1983	Charles J. Roslund & Bruce M. Cook	Anteco Software	
Pinball Factory	1986	Kary McFadden	Michtron	
Pitfall II	1985	Steve Bjork (SRB Software) for Activision (original, non-Coco version by David Crane)	Tandy Corporation	
Pitstop II	1985	Epyx	Epyx	
Planet Invasion	1984	Steve Gieseking	Spectral Associates	Defender clone.
Planet Raider	1983	Dave Edson	Aardvark-80	
Planetfall	1984	Infocom	Infocom	
Plateau of the Past	1986		Zytek, Ltd.	
Polaris	1981		Radio Shack	Similar to Missile Command.
Poltergeist	1982	Robert Arnstein (SLM Entertainment and MGM Film Co.)	Tandy Corporation	
Pooyan	1983	Konami	Datasoft	
Popcorn	1982	Steve Bjork (Datasoft)	Tandy Corporation	
Project Nebula	1981	Tandy Corporation	Tandy Corporation	
Protector II	1983	Mike Potter	Synapse Software	
Protectors	1982	Ron Beatty	Tom Mix Software	
Pumpman	1984	Dave Dies	Saguaro Software	
Pursuit	1986	Craig Stewart	Tandy Corporation	
Pyramid	1981	Rodger Olsen	Aardvark-80	
Pyramid 2000	1982	Robert Arnstein	Radio Shack	
Q*Man	1983		Genesis Software	
Qiks	1984	Ryan Olsen	Spectral Associates	
Quasar Commander	1980	Tandy Corporation	Tandy Corporation	
Que Bit	1984	Mike Roberts	Mike Ro Products	
Quedex	1989	Thalamus Ltd	Thalamus Ltd	
Quest	1981	Robert J. Retelle and Rodger Olsen	Aardvark-80	
Quest For Thelda	1989	Eric A. Wolf	Sundog Systems	
Questprobe #1: Hulk	1984	Scott Adams (original game), Roger Schrag (Coco port)	Adventure International	
Quix	1984	Claude R. Gagnon (original prototype by Steve Ostrom)	Tom Mix Software	
Raaka-Tu	1982	Robert Arnstein	Tandy Corporation	
Racerball	1984	Microdeal	Microdeal	Pac-Man clone.
Radio Ball	1983	Robert Arnstein	Tandy Corporation	
Rail Runner	1982	B.J. Chambless	Computerware	
Rampage!	1989	Steve Bjork for Activision	Tandy Corporation	
Reactoid	1983	Robert Arnstein (Initial design by Mark Siegel)	Tandy Corporation	
Rear Guard	1983	Jim Hurd	Adventure International	
Rescue on Fractalus!	1987	Lucasfilm Games	Epyx	
Return of Junior's Revenge	1986	B.J. Chambless (?)	Computerware	
Return of the Jeti	1983		Thundervision	
Revenge of the Alien Bongo Beast from the Crissy Crossy Lines Dimension	1989	Stewart Orchard	Kouga Software	
Revenge of the Mutant Miners	1989	Jeff Robinson (?)	JR & JR Softstuff	
Revolution	1982	Al Hine	Inter + Action	
Robin Hood	1984	Mike Chilton	Microdeal	
RoboCop	1989	ZCT Systems Group	Data East / Tandy Corporation	Requires the Color Computer 3.
Robot Odyssey	1984	Mike Wallace, Leslie Grimm	The Learning Company	Sequel to Rocky's Boots.
Robottack	1983	David W. Clark, sound by Bob Miller	Intracolor	
Rocky's Boots	1984	Warren Robinett, Leslie Grimm	The Learning Company	
Rogue	1986	A.I. Design	Epyx	
Roller Controller	1986		Spectral Associates	
Roman Checkers	1981	The Image Producers	Radio Shack	Othello with an Ancient Rome theme.
Rommel 3D	1986	Michtron	Microdeal	
Rommel's Revenge	1984	Design Design	Crystal Computing	Battlezone clone.
Rowboat	1981	John Conner	Aardvark-80	
Rubicon II	1983	Phillip E. Keller	Ark Royal Games	
Rupert Rhythm	1982	Joseph Pierce	Coniah Software	
Rush'n Assault	1987	Ron Adams, original game by Konami	Sierra Online / Datasoft	
Saigon: Final Days	1987	Mark Hensley (under the name of Microdeal)	Microdeal	
Sailor Man	1984	Chris Latham	Tom Mix Software	Popeye clone.
Sam Sleuth	1984	Steve Hartford	Computerware	
Scarfman	1982	Philip A. Oliver	The Cornsoft Group	
Scepter of Kzirgla	1984	Ken and Rob Knauth	Aardvark-80	
Sea Dragon	1983	Wayne Westmoreland, Terry Gilman	Adventure International	
Sea Search	1983	Stephen O'Dea, Bob Withers (game design also done by Kathy O'Dea and Dollie Withers)	Mark Data Products	originally Sea Quest
Seastalker	1984	Infocom	Infocom	
Shaft	1983	Loren Seng	Prickly Pear Software	
Shamus	1983	Synapse Software	Radio Shack	
Shanghai	1987	Activision	Activision	Requires the Color Computer 3.
Shark Treasure	1983	Greg W. Anderson	Computerware	
Shenanigans	1983	Stephen O'Dea, Bob Withers	Mark Data Products	
Ship Hunt	1982	David A. Kryprian	Spectral Associates	
Shock Trooper	1985	Rob Shaw	Mark Data Products	
Shoot-Out	1985	Chris Latham	Tom Mix Software	
Shooting Gallery	1982	Tandy Corporation	Tandy Corporation	
Shootout At The OK Galaxy	1982	Britt Monk	Avalon Hill	
Shrink	1984	David W. Thompson	Sierra Online / Datasoft	
Shuttle Simulator	1981	Warren Bittner	Tom Mix Software	
Silpheed	1988	Synergistic Software	Sierra On-Line	Requires the Color Computer 2. The graphics are enhanced in the Color Computer 3 version.
Sinistaar	1989	Dave Dies (under the name of Phantom Software)	Sundog Systems	
Sir Eggbert Jumper	1982	David Lionell Dawson	David Lionell Dawson	
Skiing	1980	Tandy Corporation	Tandy Corporation	
Skramble	1983	Microdeal	Microdeal	Scramble clone.
Sky Defense	1984	Frank Hogg Laboratories	Tom Mix Software	
Skyway	1985	Rodger Smith	Novasoft	
Slashball	1981	Rodger Olsen	Aardvark-80	
Slay the Nereis	1984	John J. and Margaret S. Fiedler	Fiedler Enterprises	
Slots and Cards	1986	Doug and Kevin Leany (Nimbus Enterprises)	MicroDeal	
Snak Pac	1982	Larry Bank	Tom Mix Software	
Snake Pit	1989	Steve Bjork	SRB Software and Game Point Software	
Soko-ban	1984		Tandy Corporation	
Solo Pool	1982	John Fraysse	Tom Mix Software	
Soooper Pac	1983	Michael Freeman	Bare Bones Software	may have been called Jaws pre-distribution deal
Soviet Bloc	1991	John R. Strong	Strongware	
Space Ambush	1983	Andy Kluck	Computerware	
Space Assault	1981		Tandy Corporation	
Space Intruders (Adventure International)	1981	Charles Forsythe	Adventure International	
Space Intruders (Tandy)	1988	Nick Marentes	Tandy Corporation	
Space Marauder	1987	Craig Stewart	Tandy Corporation	
Space Merchant	1982	Paul Herder (Coco conversion)	GOSUB International	
Space Race	1982	Rick Lamont and Daron Stinnett	Spectral Associates	
Space Raiders	1982	Brian Bruderer	Mark Data Products	
Space Sentry	1983	John Nakoski	Spectral Associates	
Space Shuttle (Aardvark-80)	1982		Aardvark-80	
Space Shuttle (Tom Mix)	1983	John Fraysse	Tom Mix Software	
Space War (American Small Business Computers)	1982		American Small Business Computers	
Space War (Spectral Associates)	1981		Spectral Associates	
Space Wrek	1984	Steve Gieseking	Spectral Associates	
Space Zapper	1982		Aardvark-80	
Speed Racer	1984	Steven Hirsch	Michtron	
Spidercide	1983	Tim Swisher	Tandy Corporation	
Springster	1987		Tandy Corporation	
Squeeze	1982		Real Software	
SR-71	1983	Lee Earle	Tom Mix Software	
Star Blaster	1981	Jim Kearney	Micro Works	
Star Blaze	1983	Tandy Corporation	Tandy Corporation	
Star Spores	1984	David Shadoff	Spectral Associates	
Star Swoop	1985	D.K. Pridmore	Blaby Computer Games	
Star Trader	1984	Steve Hartford	Computerware	
Star Trek III	1981	Diane Bernard (with help by author of original TRS-80 version Lance Micklus)	Adventure International	later StarFlite
Starbase Attack	1981	Fred Scerbo	Illustrated Memory Banks	
Starblazer	1983	Phil Keller	Ark Royal Games	
Starfighter	1981	Sparky Starks	Adventure International	
Starfire	1982	Harvey Brofman	Intellectronics	
Starship Chameleon	1982	Ken Kalish	Computerware	
Stellar Life Line	1983	Steve Bjork (SRB Software)	Tandy Corporation	
Stinger	1983		Eigen Systems	
Stone Raider II	1986	Rolf Michelson	Microdeal	
Storm	1982	B.J. Chambless	Computerware	
Storm Arrows	1983	Tom D. Keeton	Spectral Associates	
Strip Tails	1983		Boudoir Software	
Strip Tease	1983	Bitt Monk	Britt Monk, CDP	
Sub Battle Simulator	1987	TX Digital Illusions	Epyx	
Super Bustout	1981	Glenn Sogge (Designed by Al Baker and Dick Ainsworth) - The Image Producers	Tandy Corporation	
Super Pitfall	1988	SRB Software	Epyx	Requires the Color Computer 3.
Syzygy	1984	Scott Cabit	Spectral Associates	
Talking Android Attack	1981	Spectral Associates	Tandy Corporation	Updated version of Robot Battle. Berzerk clone.
Tanglewood	1987	Microdeal	Microdeal	
Tanjali	1981	John Griffen (Strawberry Software)	Strawberry Software and The Software Guild	
Tea Time	1985	Professor Adrian Eddleston, graphics by Stephen Eddleston-McGrath	Microdeal	
Teee Offf	1983	Loren Seng	Prickly Pear Software	
Telengard	1983	Daniel Lawrence (original PET version), Ross Magerus (Coco version).	Avalon Hill	
Temple of ROM	1982	Rick Adams	Tandy Corporation	
Tennis	1982		Tandy Corporation	
Tetris	1987	Greg Zumwalt (Academy Soft-ELORG)	Tandy Corporation	
The Alchemist's Laboratory	1982		Real Software	
The Andrea Coco	1985	Art Martin	Saguaro Software	
The Black Sanctum (Graphics version)	1983	Stephen O'Dea, Bob Withers (based on original text adventure version by Ron Krebs, released Aug. 8, 1981)	Mark Data Products	
The Black Sanctum (Text version)	1981	Ron Krebs	Mark Data Products	
The Crystal City	1990	Jeremy Spiller (Gosub Software)	Sundog Systems	
The Dallas Quest	1984	James Garon	Tandy Corporation	
The Dark Pit	1985	G. Twist, T. Folks	Microdeal	
The Dragon's Castle	1986	Steven C. Mitchell	Mitchell Software	
The Entity	1990	Mike Snyder	Biware Enterprises	
The Factory	1984		Tandy Corporation	
The Final Countdown	1983		Jarb Software	
The Final Frontier	1986		Ark Royal Games	
The Frog	1983	A. Hubble	Tom Mix Software	
The Great Word Game	1982		Prickly Pear Software	
The Hitchhiker's Guide to the Galaxy	1984	Infocom	Infocom	
The Interbank Incident	1986	John Gabbard and David Figge, graphics by E.T. Gatlin, for Spectral Associates	Tandy Corporation	
The Lair	1985	Tom Stephenson and James J. Walton	Freebooter Software	
The Mean Craps Machine	1981	Lance Micklus	Adventure International	
The Memory Game	1988		RAM Electronics	
The Pond	1984	Larry Bank (Sunburst Communications, game designed by Eric Grubbs and Mike Fish)	Tandy Corporation	
Rad Warrior	1988	Palace Software	Epyx	Requires the Color Computer 3.
The Sands of Egypt	1982	Datasoft	Tandy Corporation	
The Touchstone	1984	Paulo Castrignano of Brazil	Tom Mix Software	
The Vortex Factor	1981	Martin Dean	Computerware	
The Wizard's Tomb	1983	Chris Hawks	Skyline Software	
Thexder	1988	Synergistic Software	Sierra On-Line	Requires the Color Computer 3.
Thunder Road	1983	Don and Freda Boner, ported to the Coco by Charles Forsythe	The Programmer's Guild	
Time Bandit	1984	Bill Dunlevy, Harry Lafnear	Microdeal	
Time Fighter	1983	Rob Shaw	Mark Data Products	
Time Patrol	1983	M.G. Lustig	Computerware	
To Preserve Quandic	1984	David Karam	Prickly Pear Software	Exclusive to the Color Computer.
Tower of Fear	1982	Charles Forsythe	The Programmer's Guild	
Trapfall	1983	Ken Kalish	Tom Mix Software	
Trek Adventure	1981	Robert J. Retelle	Aardvark-80	
Trek-16	1982	Charles J Roslund	Tom Mix Software	
Trekboer	1984	Stephen O'Dea, Bob Withers	Mark Data Products	
Trickashay	1982	David Crandall	AHL Computing	
Tube Frenzy	1982	Dave Edson	Aardvark-80	
Tube Way Army	1984	Design Design	Rainbow Software	Scramble clone.
Tut's Tomb	1984		Mark Data Products	
Tutankam	1983	Dave Edson	Aardvark-80	
Vampire Castle	1981	David W. Bohl	Aardvark-80	
Varloc	1985	Kevin Hoare	Tandy Corporation	
Vegas Game Pak (Novasoft)	1984	Douglas and Kevin Leany	Novasoft	
Vegas Gamepak	1981	Dan Nelson	Nelson Software Systems	
Venturer	1982		Aardvark-80	
Video Pinball	1980		Tandy Corporation	
Viet Cong (V.C.)	1982	Britt Monk	Avalon Hill	
Viking	1982	Ed McGinley	Prickly Pear Software	
Voxchess	1985		Computerware	
Voyager	1981		Avalon Hill	
Voyager I: Sabotage of the Robot Ship	1984	William D. Volk	Microcomputer Games	
Wacky Food	1983		Arcade Animation Inc.	
War Kings	1985	Marty Woods	Tom Mix Software	
Warmonger	1984	Kevin Hoare	Diecom Products	
Warp Fighter 3D	1984	Bobby Dean	Tom Mix Software	
Warrior	1984	Joel Page	Tom Mix Software	
Warrior King	1984	Joel Page	Tom Mix Software	
Weirdo	1982	Dennis Boyer	Dunwood	
Wett Shirt Contest	1984	Steve Bjork (SRB Software)	Spectral Associates	
Where in the World Is Carmen Sandiego?	1987	Computerware	Brøderbund Software	
Whirlybird Run	1983	Brett Norman	Spectral Associates	
Wild Party	1983		B&B Software	
Wildcatting	1982	Harlow B. Staley (The Image Producers)	Tandy Corporation	
Willy's Warehouse	1984	David W. Clark, sound by Bob Miller	Intracolor	
Winnie the Pooh in the Hundred Acre Wood	1987	Sierra On-Line	Sierra On-Line	
Wishbringer	1985	Infocom	Infocom	
Wizard's Den	1987	Matt Harper	Novasoft	
Wizard's Tower	1987	Matt Harper	Novasoft	
Wizards Quest	1986	Edward Scio	Microdeal	
World Class Chess	1991	Chris Burke	Burke & Burke	
Worlds of Flight	1984	John Fraysse and Mike Hughey	Tom Mix Software	
Wormhole	1984	David F. Wright	Computerware	
Wrestle Maniac	1986	Kevin Hoare	Diecom Products	
Xenion	1987	Michael Duncan	Diecom Products	
Yahtzee 80	1982	The Image Producers / Harlow Staley	Tandy Corporation	
Yahtzee I	1982	Gary Brown, Bob Moran, Paul Herder (Coco conversion)	GOSUB International	
Z-89	1989	Steve Bjork (SRB Software)	SRB Software and Game Point Software	
Zak's Undead	1986	Kevin and Douglas Leany	Novasoft	
Zaxxon	1983	Steve Bjork	Datasoft	Full title: The Official Zaxxon by Sega.
Zenix	1989	Jeremy Spiller and Mike Newell	Sundog Systems	
Zeus	1983	Designed by Rodger Olsen, programmed by Roderick Smith and Michael Roberts	Aardvark-80	
Zone 6	1983	Ottmar Bochardt	Colorquest	
Zork I	1984	Infocom	Infocom	Requires the Color Computer 2.
Zork II	1984	Infocom	Infocom	
Zork III	1984	Infocom	Infocom	

== See also ==
- List of TRS-80 games
- Category:Dragon 32 games
- List of software for the TRS-80
