= Pete Lyon =

UK-based visual artist (born 1950)

Peter Michael Lyon
- Born: 1950 (age 74–75); Liverpool, England
- Notable work: Redwall covers, Team17
- Style: Oil painting, computer graphics
- Website: www.petelyon.co.uk

Peter Michael Lyon is a UK-based visual artist who has worked in a wide range of 2D and 3D media spanning from traditional oil painting to computer graphics, for the science fiction and fantasy genres. According to his personal website, he has been involved in various works in the computer games industry such as graphic production, teaching and management, with 3D modelling and animation. He is known as a pioneer graphic designer for the Atari and the Amiga in the 1980s and 1990s.

== Early life and education ==
Born in 1950 in north Liverpool, England, Lyon attended St Mary's Roman Catholic College in Crosby. From 1962, he and his family lived in Australia, in the outback town of Penola and in Adelaide where he attended the Croydon Boys Technical High School, returning to St Mary's in the mid-60's. Lyon attended Liverpool College of Art and Design, where his tutors included pop-artist Sam Walsh, Maurice Cockrill R.A. and Mersey poet Adrian Henri. He gained a 2.1 B.A. degree in 1973. A major element of his final portfolio was the fantasy black and white graphic work Calmabloc plus a set of representational paintings.

== Career ==
=== Role in science fiction fandom ===
Lyon moved to Leeds in West Yorkshire in 1973 and by the mid-1970s, after working in short-term posts, he set out to develop as an artist and began working on painting techniques (oils, acrylics, airbrushing). A growing involvement in the science fiction (SF) fandom led to the production of a large quantity of cartoons and pictures for many science fiction fanzines of the late 1970s and early 1980s. In 1982, he was voted UK fan artist of the year. He also helped organize a number of UK science fiction conventions and ran the art show at Seacon, the world science fiction convention, in 1989. He was also a guest of honour in Glasgow at Albacon III in 1986 alongside Joe Haldeman, John Jarold and Clive Barker. He was twice nominated for British SF Association Awards firstly in 1982 and again in 1987 for his cover work on the first Interzone magazines.

=== Contribution to 1980s computer games ===
Lyon taught illustration and computer programming for the BBC Micro at Swarthmore adult college in Leeds during the mid-1980s. He also became a professional freelance artist and worked as a cover illustrator for speculative fiction. In 1986 he joined the emerging computer games industry. Working with Steve Bak at Microdeal, he developed graphics for a string of early games such as The Karate Kid Part II (1986), Goldrunner (1987), Airball (1987), Tanglewood (1988), Leatherneck (1988), and Fright Night (1988). His programming experience allowed him to adapt graphics to the needs of the programmer, maximizing the limited processing and graphics capabilities of 1980s technology. He also worked with such significant early games developers and musicians as Archer Maclean, Rob Hubbard and Chris Sorrell.

=== Illustrations for Redwall books ===
In the mid-80's Lyon designed a series of cover illustrations for Brian Jacques’ Redwall children's novel series, including the UK cover for the first novel, Redwall (1986), and then for Mossflower (1988), and Mattimeo in 1989. In 1985, Lyon produced the cover for the hardback version of the novel The Skook by Emmy-nominated author J P Miller. He also illustrated book covers for European SF and fantasy publications including Nach dem Ende by Friedrich Scholz.

=== Illustrations for Lone Wolf books ===
In the mid-80's Lyon designed a series of cover illustrations for Joe Dever's 'Lone Wolf' books including 'Castle Death', 'Magnamund' and 'The Jungle of Horrors'.

=== Contribution to 1990s computer games ===
Lyon turned down offers of work in Hollywood, choosing to stay in England. There he built up a portfolio of high-level skills in 3D modelling and animation, working for adventure games house Revolution and publishers such as Psygnosis and Hewson Consultants. He also helped to create several commercially successful games, including Astaroth (1989), Gravity (1990), Amnios (1991), The Godfather (1992), Daughter of Serpents (1992), Powermonger (1992), Dropzone, (1994) and Worms Reinforcements (1995). As the games industry expanded in the 1990s and early 2000s, Lyon's role as a lead artist spanned graphic production, training and development, as well as management at a number of UK companies in Yorkshire and Manchester including Sprytes and Team17 where he was art director. In 1996, Lyon and games programmer Alaric Binnie set up their own company, Dot Products, and started to develop a number of game and graphic ideas together.

=== Commercial work ===
Lyon continued to work on some diverse commercial projects that included a 3D model of Stephenson's ‘Rocket’ and a Christmas promotion for the Co-op. His most recognizable commercial image in the UK is still the 2000 update of the Silent Night beds Hippo and Duck. His illustrations were used on lorry liveries, sales literature, and TV commercials. He also continued to work into the mid-2000s for a number of major northern games companies in Manchester such as Creations, and Z2 as an artist and visualizer, and later Traveller's Tales on a Lego game projects.
