= The Warlock of Firetop Mountain (disambiguation) =

The Warlock of Firetop Mountain refers to a franchise created by Steve Jackson and Ian Livingstone:

- The Warlock of Firetop Mountain, a Fighting Fantasy gamebook published in 1982
- The Warlock of Firetop Mountain (board game), a 1986 board game published by Games Workshop based on the book
- The Warlock of Firetop Mountain (video game), a 1983 ZX Spectrum video game based on the book
- Fighting Fantasy: The Warlock of Firetop Mountain, a 2009 Nintendo DS video game based on the book
