= Dark Star (1984 video game) =

- Developer: Design Design
- Publisher: Design Design
- Platforms: ZX Spectrum; Amstrad CPC; TRS-80 Color Computer; Dragon 32/64
- Release: 1984
- Genre: Shoot 'em up
- Mode: Single-player

Dark Star is a 1984 ZX Spectrum shoot 'em up developed and published by Design Design. It was ported to other home computer platforms including the Amstrad CPC, TRS-80 Color Computer, and Dragon 32/64 in 1985.

== Gameplay ==
In Dark Star, the player controls a heavily armed spaceship called LIAR (Light Interstellar Attack Recon) with the mission to liberate the Dark Star galaxy from the tyranny of the Evil Lord. The game takes place in a 16x16 sector grid, where the player must navigate through space, hop between planets, and use hyperspace gates to jump between sectors.

The gameplay is divided into two main phases: space combat and planetary assault. In space, the player's battle computer generates a real-time display of the immediate vicinity, showing enemy ships, missiles, energy concentrations, and Warp Gates. The LIAR's weaponry is fixed and aimed by maneuvering the ship, with plasma bolts fired in the direction of flight. Energy can be replenished by flying through blue squares.

On planets, the player must destroy enemy towers and bases to liberate the planet. Towers provide anti-aircraft fire and collapse when hit. Some areas are protected by force shields with navigable holes to avoid damage. Once all bases on a planet are destroyed, it is liberated, and the player can leave to continue their mission.

Dark Star utilizes 3D vector graphics and wireframe displays, reminiscent of classic arcade games like Asteroids. The game features a Tactical Sector Map that displays enemy bases, the player's ship position, and includes humorous comments. Dark Star also offers an extensive user-definable menu for customizing screen display, sound effects, skill levels, and keyboard controls.

The game includes a humorous hall of fame with various names and references. Players can adjust the difficulty setting, which affects the Empire's sphere of influence. Dark Star also features a colorful high-resolution title page and offers various customization options for controls and sound.

== Hidden content ==
The original ZX Spectrum cassette release of Dark Star contained a hidden program called Spectacle on the reverse side. This program, which resembled teletext, required password to access. Clues to these password were hidden within the game's high-score table, referencing the Supertramp song "Just Another Nervous Wreck" from the album "Breakfast in America". According to Simon Brattel, one of the game's developers, working on Spectacle helped keep the team sane during Dark Star's development.

== Reception ==
Reception

Review scores
Publication	Score
Amstrad Action	84%
Amtix	74%
Crash	89%
Computer and Video Games	33/40
Sinclair User	8/10
Personal Computer Games	8/10
Home Computing Weekly	5/5
Your Spectrum	8/15
Amstrad Computer User	5/5

Award
Publication	Award
Crash	Smash!

Dark Star received generally positive reviews from contemporary gaming magazines, with praise for its graphics and customization options, but some criticism for its difficulty and potential repetitiveness.

Computer and Video Games described the 3D star field as "very pretty" and a "visual treat," while Crash called the graphics "breathtakingly fast" and "smooth," though noting they were not very detailed. Home Computing Weekly and Personal Computer Games also praised the game's "spectacular graphics," with the latter emphasizing how they created a strong sensation of three-dimensional space. Amstrad User echoed these sentiments, describing the graphics as "spectacular" and noting the use of colored lines.

The game's speed was frequently highlighted. Crash claimed it must be "the fastest Spectrum graphics," while Popular Computing Weekly described the game as "fast" and "astonishing." Amstrad Action also noted the "fast, exciting movement" of the game.

Reviewers appreciated the game's customization options. Computer and Video Games praised the "user-definable menu" as "the real joy of this game," while Home Computing Weekly noted features such as user-definable keys, joystick options, and selectable sound effects. Personal Computer Games and Amstrad Action also mentioned the numerous options available to players.

The difficulty of the game was a point of contention. Crash noted that the game was "difficult to play at first" and "takes quite a bit of time to master," while Personal Computer Games described it as "very difficult" and demanding high skills. Amtix found the game "not easy to control" but "easy to get into".

Some reviewers expressed concerns about repetitiveness. Your Spectrum stated that the game "becomes rather repetitive" and "loses most of its appeal" over time, though noted that turning off alien missiles could make the game more enjoyable. Popular Computing Weekly similarly suggested that some might find the game "repetitive" or "boring." Amstrad Action also mentioned that "attacking bases may get a bit samey."

Despite these criticisms, many reviewers found the game compelling. Personal Computer Games described it as "exciting" and "compelling," stating that reviewer "kept wanting to have just one more go." Computer and Video Games concluded that the game was "well worth the wait" and expressed interest in the planned sequel. Amstrad User wrote that the game "deserves considerable success."
