= Tanglewood (1987 video game) =

1987 video game

- Cover art
- Developer(s): Microdeal
- Publisher(s): Microdeal
- Designer(s): Ian Murray-Watson
- Programmer(s): Ian Murray-Watson
- Artist(s): Pete Lyon
- Platform(s): Dragon 32, TRS-80 Color Computer, Atari ST, Amiga
- Release: 1987: Dragon, CoCo; 1988: Amiga, Atari ST
- Genre(s): Puzzle/adventure
- Mode(s): Single-player

Tanglewood is a puzzle/adventure computer game published by Microdeal for the Dragon 32 and TRS-80 Color Computer in early 1987. It was released for the Atari ST and Amiga in 1988.

== Gameplay ==
Main screen of the Dragon 32 version

The 8-bit and 16-bit versions of the game have a different setting and characters but the same basic premise. In the 8-bit versions, Tanglewood is a peaceful glade under threat from a property developer and wizard named Sharck. The player controls five different animal characters who have ten days to defeat Sharck before the bulldozers move in.

In the 16-bit version, the premise is that Tanglewood contains valuable minerals that have only been discovered after the protagonist's uncle Arthur acquired mining rights from an unscrupulous company. The company now want to mine Tanglewood themselves and are suing Arthur for the rights back. The player has 10 days until the court case and must find the documents to win the case. Instead of controlling animals, the player controls five remote controlled vehicles.

== Development ==
The game had originally been planned to be based on the children's TV series Willo the Wisp but this was dropped. It was designed and programmed by Ian Murray-Watson with graphics by Pete Lyon. Pete Lyon also produced the graphics for other MicroDeal games including Goldrunner (1987) and Airball (1987).

Tanglewood was first released by Microdeal in 1987 in a joint release for the Dragon 32 and TRS-80 Color Computer. It was released on the 16-bit Amiga and Atari ST in 1988 and was also published by Microdeal in the US.

== Reception ==
Reviews were favourable with Dragon User giving a full score of 5/5 with the reviewer stating Tanglewood is "very hard" but "an excellent game". A review of the Atari ST version in ST-Log also emphasised the difficulty of the game but gave particular praise to the graphics and sound effects.
