= The Karate Kid Part II: The Computer Game =

1986 beat 'em up game

- Developer: Microdeal
- Publishers: Microdeal; Ozisoft (AUS)
- Designer: Steve Bak
- Artist: Pete Lyon
- Series: The Karate Kid
- Platforms: Atari ST; Amiga
- Release: Atari ST: EU: 1986; NA: 1987; Amiga: EU: 1987; NA: 1988
- Genre: Fighting
- Modes: Single-player, multiplayer

The Karate Kid Part II: The Computer Game is a 1986 fighting game developed and published by Microdeal. It was based on the 1986 film The Karate Kid Part II. It was initially released for the Atari ST in 1986, and an Amiga port was published in 1987.

== Gameplay ==
Atari ST screenshot

The Karate Kid Part II is a fighting game. For much of the game, the player controls Daniel LaRusso, who faces off against various opponents in karate matches. The player can use a variety of attack moves, including roundhouse kicks and flying kicks. Some moves are more effective than others. The game includes two bonus levels played occasionally after fights. In one bonus level, the player controls Mr. Miyagi as he tries to catch a fly using chopsticks. In the other bonus level, Daniel must break blocks of ice. The game includes a two-player option.

== Reception ==
Reception

Review scores
Publication	Score
ACE	720/1000 (Amiga)
Amiga Today	91/100 (Amiga)
Commodore User	8/10 (Amiga)
.info	3.5/5 (Amiga)
Popular Computing Weekly	4/5 (Atari ST)
Your Computer	4/5 (Atari ST)

The Karate Kid Part II received praise for its graphics, although some reviewers were critical of the small character designs. The sound was praised as well, while the music received positive and negative responses.

Francis Jago of Commodore User praised the game's loading sequence, and wrote that many of the film's sequences "have been faithfully recreated" for a game. Computer and Video Games praised the quick execution of the various attacks, stating that it put the game "in a slightly higher category than most other" beat 'em up games. Benn Dunnington of .info praised the game's joystick control, calling it natural and responsive. Duncan Evans of Popular Computing Weekly wrote that film-based games "often don't live up" to the source material, while stating that The Karate Kid Part II exceeded all expectations.

Author Jamie Lendino wrote in 2019 that the game had two benefits, stating that it was released at a time when there were "still precious few games available for the ST, and it was actually good" considering it was a film tie-in. Lendino praised the backdrops, sound effects, fluid animation and precise control.
