= To Preserve Quandic =

1984 video game

- Title Screen
- Developer: Suspense Software
- Publisher: Prickly Pear Software
- Designer: David Karam
- Platform: TRS-80 Color Computer
- Release: 1984
- Genre: Adventure game
- Mode: Single-player

To Preserve Quandic is a graphical adventure game written by David Karam for the TRS-80 Color Computer and published by Prickly Pear Software in 1984. Taking two full disks, it was larger than both The Sands of Egypt and The Dallas Quest, which preceded it. The premise is to preserve the pacifistic Quandic race, who had advanced technology like time machines.
