= PCW =

PCW can stand for:

== Science and technology ==
- Polycrystalline wool, thermally insulating fiber

=== Computing ===
- Amstrad PCW home computers
- Former Personal Computer World, a British magazine
- Former Popular Computing Weekly, a British magazine
- PC World (magazine), a global online computer magazine

== Other ==
- Preston City Wrestling, UK
