= Dino Wars (disambiguation) =

Dino Wars is a 1990 video game by DigiTek Software

It may also refer to:

- DinoCity, a 1992 video game by Irem, known in Japan as Dinowars
- Dino Wars, a 1980 video game published by Radio Shack, see list of TRS-80 Color Computer games
- Dino Wars, a play-by-mail game, see list of play-by-mail games
- Dinowars, a comic book by Rod Espinosa
