= Invasion of the Body Snatchas! =

1983 video game

- Developers: Simon Brattel; Neil Mottershead
- Publisher: Crystal Computing
- Platform: ZX Spectrum
- Release: 1983
- Genre: Scrolling shooter

Invasion of the Body Snatchas! is a 1983 horizontally scrolling shooter developed and published by Crystal Computing for the ZX Spectrum. Despite its name, it has no connection to the 1956 film and 1978 film of similar names. It is a clone of the 1981 arcade video game Defender. Invasion of the Body Snatchas! would go on to be re-released as Blow-out in 1998 by MCM Software S.A.

== Reception ==
In-game screenshot

Sinclair User reviewed the game in their magazine, "At last! a version as fast and furious and as frustratingly addictive as the arcade original Landers, Mutants, Bombers, Pods, Swarmers and much much more combine to produce the ultimate space game!"
