= Newsroom (disambiguation) =

A newsroom is a place where journalists work to gather news to be published.

Newsroom may also refer to:

== Television ==
- Newsroom (BBC programme), a BBC2 news programme from 1964 to 1973
  - BBC Newsroom South East, BBC's news programme for southeastern England
- "Newsroom" (Drop the Dead Donkey), pilot episode of the British comedy series
- The Newsroom (Canadian TV series), a comedy-drama series that ran 1996–2005
- The Newsroom (American TV series), a drama series on the HBO cable channel that ran 2012–2014
- America's Newsroom, an American news/talk program on Fox News Channel that began in 2007
- CNN Newsroom, an American news program on CNN/US that began in 2006
- CNN Newsroom (CNNI), the similar CNN Newsroom on CNN International
- JTBC Newsroom, a newscast of the South Korean JTBC Television Network

== Other uses ==
- The Newsroom, now the Guardian News & Media Archive, in London
- Newsroom (website), a New Zealand news publication
- Newsroom Navigator, a collection of online resources used by reporters at The New York Times
- SPIE Newsroom, a technical news website operated by SPIE
- The Newsroom, a BBC World Service radio show
- The Newsroom, a 1984 newspaper publishing software by Springboard Software
