= Microdeal =

Video game company

- Industry: Video games
- Founder: John Symes
- Headquarters: St Austell, Cornwall, England
- Products: Video games

Microdeal was a British software company which operated during the 1980s and early 1990s from its base at Truro Road in the town of St Austell, Cornwall. The company, founded by John Symes was one of the major producers of games and other software for the 8-bit home computers of the time, in particular the Dragon 32 and the similar Tandy TRS-80 Color Computer ("CoCo").

The 8-bit software market dwindled toward the end of the 1980s and Symes officially announced that Microdeal would no longer publish for the Dragon and Tandy machines on 1 January 1988; from this point they would concentrate on the newer generation of 16-bit computers, the Amiga and Atari ST, with their remaining stock of Dragon and Tandy software to be sold off by a company called Computape. Many of Microdeal's 16-bit titles were updated versions of successful 8-bit games such as Time Bandit and Tanglewood, but proved less successful the second time around. This was followed by The Karate Kid Part II: The Computer Game, based on the 1986 film. The company was quick to recognise the music capabilities of the Atari ST and Amiga and went in production of Music Samplers such as "MasterSound" and "Amas", the latter of which was featured on a Paula Abdul music video, which won MTV's Music Video of the year award. The companies publishing licences were sold to "Hi-Soft" and it ceased trading in the early 1990s.

== Activities ==
Some of Microdeal's software was produced in-house by the company's own programmers (including Steve Bak, Rita Jay and Ed Scio) but they also licensed software from foreign sources, such as the American Tom Mix Software and Spectral Associates, and published the works of independent programmers (notably Ken Kalish, who was responsible for some of their most successful titles). Frequently the digital artist Pete Lyon was responsible for the graphics as well as having some design input. Pete worked on MicroDeal games such as Goldrunner, Airball, Tanglewood, Leatherneck and Fright Night.

Much of the software brought to the United Kingdom from the United States was originally written for the Tandy CoCo (which was the more popular machine there) and converted to work with the Dragon. These conversions were contracted out to a company called Northern Software Consultants where they were handled by lead programmer Chas Robertson. Robertson also designed the dongle device that was experimentally used for copy protection of a single Microdeal title, Buzzard Bait. Some of Microdeal's licensed games were renamed for the British market. For example, they released a series of games based around the company mascot Cuthbert (Cuthbert Goes Digging, Cuthbert in the Jungle, etc.). The original members of this series were written in-house by Steve Bak, but later additions were completely unrelated. Rather, they were renamed titles from several different sources – the graphical limitations of computers at that time meant that a character was unrecognisable and could be given any convenient name. Microdeal also had a brand called Pocket Money Software, which published simpler games submitted by users at a lower price than the main titles. While some Pocket Money games were arguably of poor quality, others were among the company's most popular titles.

Microdeal also sold Cuthbert-branded blank media (tapes, disks, etc.), re-boxed and sometimes adapted hardware (such as joysticks) made by other companies and published an occasional semi-informative, semi-promotional magazine called The Cuthbert Chronicle. They also accounted for most of the advertising space and reviews of Dragon User magazine.

== List of Microdeal software ==
- 3D-Calc
- 8-Ball
- Airball
- Airball Construction Kit
- Air Traffic Control
- Alcatraz
- Arena 3000
- Athletyx
- Backgammon
- Beam Rider
- Bubble Buster (Pocket Money)
- Buzzard Bait
- Cashman
- Chambers
- Cosmic Zap
- Crash
- Crazy Painter
- Crossland
- Crystle Castles
- Cuber
- Cuthbert and the Golden Chalice
- Cuthbert Anthology
- Cuthbert Enters the Tombs of Doom
- Cuthbert Goes Digging
- Cuthbert Goes Walkabout
- Cuthbert in the Cooler
- Cuthbert in the Jungle
- Cuthbert in the Mines
- Cuthbert in Space
- Danger Ranger
- The Dark Pit
- Datafall (Pocket Money)
- Defense
- Demolition Derby
- Devil Assault
- Dragonhawk
- Dragon Invaders
- Dungeon Raid
- El Diablero
- Electron
- Fearless Freddy (Pocket Money)
- Filmastr (Database)
- Flip Side
- Flipper
- Fright Night
- Frogger
- Galagon
- Goldrunner
- Goldrunner II
- Grabber
- The Grail
- Ice Castles
- Insanity Fight
- Invaders' Revenge
- Jerusalem: Adventure II
- Jet Boot Colin (Pocket Money)
- Jug
- Jupiter Probe
- The Karate Kid Part II: The Computer Game
- Katerpillar Attack
- Keys of the Wizard
- Donkey King (renamed to The King in 1983)
- King Tut
- The Lands of Havoc
- Leatherneck
- Major Motion
- Mr. Dig
- Mansion: Adventure I
- Module Man
- Mudpies
- Pengon
- Phantom Slayer
- Pinball Factory
- Pit Fiend (Pocket Money)
- Planet Invasion
- Robin Hood (Pocket Money)
- Shock Trooper
- Shuttle II
- Skid Row Adventure
- Skramble
- Slaygon
- Slide (Pocket Money)
- Slip Stream
- Space Raiders
- Space Shuttle Simulator
- Space War
- Speed Racer
- Stone Raider
- Stine Raider II
- Super Hits From Microdeal (Compilation)
- Syzygy
- Soccer
- Talking Android Attack
- Tanglewood
- Tea Time (Pocket Money)
- Tele-Artist (Graphic utility)
- Tele-Forth (Forth language system)
- Telewriter (Word processor)
- Tetra Quest
- Time Bandit
- Touchstone
- Trekboer
- Trivia Challenge
- Turbo Trax
- The Vortex Factor
- Ultimate: Adventure IV
- Williamsburg: Adventure III
- Worlds of Flight
