= The Dungeon Master (video game) =

1983 video game

- Publisher: Crystal Computing
- Designer: Graham Stafford
- Platform: ZX Spectrum
- Release: EU: 1983
- Genre: Role-playing

The Dungeon Master is a text-based role-playing video game written by Graham Stafford for the ZX Spectrum and published by Crystal Computing in 1983.

The player can create dungeons in an underground labyrinth and venture into them with a lone adventurer, searching for turquoise rings. The player moves from room to room fighting monsters, picking up equipment, and gaining levels.

== Reception ==
The game was well received when it was released.
