= Insanity Fight =

1987 shooter video game

- Developer(s): Linel
- Publisher(s): Microdeal
- Programmer(s): Christian Haller
- Platform(s): Amiga, iOS
- Release: 1987: Amiga; 2014: iOS
- Genre(s): Scrolling shooter
- Mode(s): Single player

Insanity Fight is a vertically scrolling shooter developed by Linel for the Amiga and originally published by Microdeal in 1987. An iOS version from the original programmer was released in 2014.
