= Cashman (video game) =

1983 video game

- Publisher: Computer Shack
- Programmers: Bill Dunlevy; Doug Frayer
- Platforms: TRS-80 Color Computer, Dragon 32, MBC-550
- Release: July 1983
- Genre: Platform
- Mode: Single-player

Cashman is a platform game by Bill Dunlevy and Doug Frayer for the TRS-80 Color Computer and Dragon 32 (also released on the Sanyo MBC-550), published by Computer Shack in July 1983. The game contains a mixture of elements from other platform games, most notably Jumpman. The player can control either a Sailor or a Sheikh, running up and down stairs and avoiding bats, cats, bombs, and other creatures in order to collect dollar signs.

Dunlevy also co-developed Time Bandit for the Color Computer.
