= Madness and the Minotaur =

1981 video game

- Developer(s): Spectral Associates
- Publisher(s): Radio Shack; Microdeal (EU); Dragon Data (Dragon 32)
- Designer(s): Tom Rosenbaum
- Platform(s): TRS-80 Color Computer, Dragon 32
- Release: TRS-80 CoCo: NA/UK: 1981; Dragon 32: UK: 1982
- Genre(s): Interactive fiction
- Mode(s): Single-player

Madness and the Minotaur is a text adventure game, published in 1981 for the TRS-80 Color Computer by Radio Shack in North America and by Microdeal in the United Kingdom. It was developed by Spectral Associates founder, Thomas Rosenbaum. A Dragon 32 version was published in 1982 by Dragon Data.

== Gameplay ==
The goal of the game is to retrieve a number of treasures. In the course of doing this, the player will encounter other objects that may or may not be useful. Often, the player needs one object to act as a "key" for another. There is no rhyme or reason to this. The player doesn't use the key object to obtain the other; he just needs to be carrying it. For example, the player may see a shield. Perhaps the player needs to be carrying the dagger to get the shield. If the player has the dagger, the shield is reachable; if he does not, it is not. With the exception of a randomly appearing "oracle", the game gives no indication of what objects are needed to reach a treasure. There are various magic spells that can be learned throughout the game that have various effects.
