= Ken Kalish =

Video game programmer

Kenneth Kalish is a game programmer who wrote TRS-80 Color Computer and Dragon 32/64 home computers in the 1980s. In the United Kingdom, most of Kalish's games were published by Microdeal.

== Games ==
- Danger Ranger
- Dungeon Raid
- El Diablero
- Monkey Kong
- Phantom Slayer
- Devil Assault
