= Halls of the Things =

1983 video game

- Cover art by Dave De Leuw
- Publisher: Crystal Computing
- Programmers: Neil Mottershead; Simon Brattel; Martin S. Horsley
- Platforms: ZX Spectrum, Amstrad CPC, Commodore 64
- Release: 1983
- Genre: Action

Halls of the Things is a video game for the ZX Spectrum published by Crystal Computing in 1983. It was ported to the Amstrad CPC and Commodore 64. The player travels through seven floors of a tower, searching for seven rings, with each floor being a complex maze of corridors and rooms. Once the player has the rings they must then find the magical key hidden in the dungeon, which opens the drawbridge allowing the player to escape. To hinder the player's progress they are attacked by "things," but the player is armed with a sword, arrows, fireballs and lightning to aid you in the quest.

The game was re-released in 1984 when the company was renamed Design Design and later published as a budget title by Firebird Software. A sequel, Return of the Things, was released in late 1984.

== Reception ==
Reception

Review scores
Publication	Score
Sinclair User	910
Zzap!64	88%

The game was well received when it was released.

"Excellent and dangerously addictive it could change the Spectrum games scene overnight". Sinclair User

"Spectacular. One of the best games i've seen, finely balanced between simplicity and addictiveness - superb graphics and colour - I CAN'T RECOMMEND IT HIGHLY ENOUGH". Popular Computing Weekly

ZX Computing magazine, featured Halls of the Things as the best game of 1983. The ZX Spectrum version was voted the 27th best game of all time in a special issue of Your Sinclair magazine in 2004.
