= Zeus Assembler =

Assembler development tool

- Original author(s): Neil Mottershead; Simon Brattel
- Developer(s): Crystal Computing
- Initial release: 1983; 42 years ago
- Platform: ZX Spectrum
- Type: Assembler; Source code editor
- License: Proprietary commercial software

Zeus Assembler is an assembler development tool for the Z80 originally written by Neil Mottershead for the Nascom 2 and then ported to the ZX Spectrum by Neil Mottershead and Simon Brattel in 1983. It was published by Crystal Computing. The program was designed to make Z80 machine code programming easier, with full symbolic instructions, and an editing style similar to the Spectrum's built-in BASIC.

Zeus Assembler was later re-released by the manufacturer of the ZX Spectrum, Sinclair Research.

A Commodore 64 version was released in 1984. "Zeus 64 Assembler".

== Overview ==
Zeus is a two-pass assembler which uses the standard Zilog Z80 instruction set mnemonics. It was one of the first assemblers to tokenise source code as it is entered, along with MAC/65 for the Atari 8-bit computers, similar to how many BASIC implementations work.

It has two command modes: assembler and editor, and includes an auto line-numbering facility, and various subroutines for use within the user's programs, as well as printer output and basic assembler features such as labels and expressions.

== Monitor and disassembler ==
The previous year Crystal Computing had released another machine code tool for the 16K ZX Spectrum called Monitor and Disassembler that could be used in conjunction with Zeus. While Zeus has a monitor included, the more extensive Monitor and Disassembler allows for disassembly, the display and editing of the processor registers, as well as code substitution and the ability to move blocks of memory. Alongside Zeus, Monitor and Disassembler was later re-released by Sinclair Research.

== Reception ==
Zeus Assembler was well-received by the computing press. Your Computer praised it as well thought-out, with good auto-line number, renumber, and block delete functions. Sinclair User and Big K highlighted the program's ease of use for beginners, while also being a very powerful tool in the hands of an expert. The necessity of exiting the assembler in order to save any generated code was cited as a potential drawback, especially for beginners.

Sinclair User also praised the documentation as the best of any assembler available at the time, for its use of step-by-step instructions and code examples.

== Windows version ==
In 2008 Simon Brattel rewrote Zeus under the same name as a cross-assembler for Microsoft Windows together with integrated emulator and debugger. This was later bundled with various changes to help ZX Spectrum Next developers.
