= Danger Ranger =

1983 video game

- Developer: Med Systems
- Publisher: Microdeal
- Designer: Ken Kalish
- Programmers: Dragon, CoCo; Ken Kalish; Atari 8-bit, C64; Rita Jay
- Platforms: Atari 8-bit, Commodore 64, Dragon, TRS-80 Color Computer
- Release: 1983
- Genre: Platform

Danger Ranger is a non-scrolling platform game designed by Ken Kalish and published in 1983 by Microdeal for the Dragon 32/64 and TRS-80 Color Computer. Versions ported to the Atari 8-bit computers and Commodore 64 by Rita Jay were released in 1984.

== Gameplay ==
The objective of the game is to traverse two different screens. In the first screen, consisting of five floors, the player must jump between platforms, collecting all the keys while avoiding bats and bullets. After collecting the tenth key, the player moves on to the second screen, walking on platforms and collecting treasure chests while avoiding acid rain drops and shooting deadly masks.

Once both screens are completed, they are repeated at a higher difficulty level.

== Reception ==
Dragon User reviewed the game in its April 1984 issue and stated that it is not Ken Kalish's best game, but it does show some originality. A reviewer for Games Computing found the Commodore 64 version to be "very difficult" in an October 1984 review.
