= Sunshine Publications =

Defunct British publisher

Sunshine Publications was based in Little Newport Street, London, England . It published Popular Computing Weekly, Dragon User and Micro Adventurer, which lasted for 17 issues.

During the boom years of personal computing in the UK, it published many books aimed at the hobby end of the computing market, and also made a short-lived foray into games software publishing.
