= Tutankham =

1982 video game

- Developer: Konami
- Publishers: Arcade: WW: Konami; NA: Stern; Ports; Parker Brothers
- Designer: H. Tanigaki
- Platforms: Arcade, Atari 2600, ColecoVision, Intellivision, VIC-20, PV-1000, PC-6001
- Release: EU: January 1982; JP/NA: July 1982
- Genres: Maze, shooter
- Modes: Single-player, multiplayer

Tutankham (Note: Japanese: ツタンカーム, Hepburn: Tsutankāmu) is a 1982 maze video game developed and published by Konami for arcades. It was released by Stern in North America. Named after Egyptian pharaoh Tutankhamun, the game combines a maze shoot 'em up with light puzzle-solving elements. It debuted at the European ATE and IMA amusement shows in January 1982 before releasing worldwide that summer. The game was a critical and commercial success and was ported to home systems by Parker Brothers.

Armed with a weapon that only fires horizontally, the player loots the maze-like tomb of Tutankhamun while finding keys to locked chambers and fighting off creatures. Tutankham is one of six games in a group photograph published in the January 1983 issue LIFE along with the record holder for each. The Tutankham champion in the photo is Mark Robichek of Mountain View, California.

== Gameplay ==
The explorer in the upper right is carrying a key for the locked door below. Five creatures are nearby (arcade version).

Taking on the role of an explorer grave robbing a horizontally scrolling, maze-like tomb of pharaoh Tutankhamun, the player is chased by asps, vultures, parrots, bats, dragons, and curses, all of which kill the explorer upon contact. The explorer wields a laser weapon that only fires left and right—there is no vertical offense—in addition to a single screen-clearing "flash bomb" per level or life. Warp zones teleport the player to another location in the level, which enemies cannot use.

To progress, the player collects keys to open locked doors throughout each level as well as treasures for bonus points. The player can only carry one key at a time, so the game requires backtracking through an area in order to obtain a second key. When the timer hits zero, the explorer can no longer shoot. Passing through the large exit door ends the level, and any remaining time is converted to bonus points.

The explorer dies upon touching an enemy. An extra life is given at 30,000 points.

== Ports ==
Tutankham was ported to home systems by Parker Brothers, who advertised the game extensively in North America, where it was released in June 1983. It was ported to the Atari 2600, ColecoVision, Intellivision, VIC-20, PV-1000, and PC-6001. Versions for the Odyssey², TI-99/4A, and Atari 8-bit computers were in development by Parker Brothers in 1983, but not published.

Two tabletop versions of Tutankham were released: an LCD game in Japan and Europe from Bandai resembling a cocktail arcade cabinet, and a VFD game from Bandai in Japan and Konami in North America.

== Reception ==
Reception

Review scores
Publication	Score			
Publication	Arcade	Atari 2600	ColecoVision	PC
Computer and Video Games	Positive			32/40
Joystik	Positive			
Retro Gamer			Positive	
Video		Positive		

The arcade game was a commercial success in 1982. It was popular in North America, where it topped the Play Meter arcade charts in October 1982 and remained in the top ten through January 1983, when it was ranked number eight. The home conversion by Parker Brothers was also successful in North America. The ColecoVision port was number seven on the UK video game sales chart in late 1983.

The game received positive reviews from critics. Computer and Video Games magazine reviewed the arcade game in March 1982, following its debut at European amusement shows, giving it generally positive coverage. Joystik magazine also gave it a positive review, calling it a "beauty" in 1982. Computer and Video Games later praised the arcade game in November 1983, calling it the first game that effectively combined the elements of an adventure game with "frenetic" shoot 'em up gameplay. They gave the VIC-20 port a positive review, calling it "a superb piece of software" amidst "the plethora of mediocre and poor quality titles being touted for this machine", but they criticized the VIC-20 cartridge's high UK price of £29.95 (equivalent to £102 in 2025). They rated the VIC-20 version (out of 10) 9 for getting started, 9 for graphics, 5 for value, and 9 for playability, for a total score of 32 out of 40.

Bill Kunkel and Arnie Katz reviewed the Atari 2600 port in the Arcade Alley column of Video magazine in 1983, calling it "a superb translation" of the "coin-op oddity—an adventure game" for the 2600. They said that "the play-action is fascinating" and invites "frequent replays" while praising the "wonderful blend of puzzle-solving and hand-eye challenge" as well as the "lush colors" and "Arabian-style score marker". They concluded that "Tutankham is video game royalty". The Video Game Update said the ColecoVision version of Tutankham was among the best arcade game ports for the system, specifically highlighting the detail in the tombs and characters.

Retro Gamer magazine reviewed the ColecoVision port in 2014. They gave it a positive review, calling it an "arcade adventure" that "remains a hidden gem in Konami's illustrious history".

== Legacy ==
Tutankham is included in Konami Classics Series: Arcade Hits for the Nintendo DS (renamed to Horror Maze). In May 2024, Hamster released Tutankham as part of the Arcade Archives series for the Nintendo Switch.

According to Hardcore Gaming 101, Konami's King's Valley (1985) is considered a spiritual successor to Tutankham in Japan. It keeps the theme of treasure hunting in Egyptian tombs and has identical end-of-level music.

=== Clones ===
- Pyramid (NEC PC-6601, 1982)
- Abracadabra! (Atari 8-bit, 1983)
- Key Quest (VIC-20, 1983)
- Cuthbert Enters the Tombs (Commodore 16 and 64, 1984)
- The Touchstone (Tandy Color Computer, 1984)
- Tut's Tomb (Tandy Color Computer, 1984)
- King Tut's Tomb (Atari 8-bit, 1985)
- Lord of the Orb (Atari 8-bit, 1985)
- Quackshot! (ZX Spectrum, 1985)
- DungeonLords (Atari 8-bit, 1988)

=== Influence ===
Time Bandit (1983), best known for its 1985 Atari ST version, was heavily inspired by Tutankham and had a working title of Pharaoh. Both games also have similarities to the 1985 arcade hit Gauntlet by Atari Games. According to Time Bandit designer Harry Lafnear, both Time Bandit and Gauntlet have roots in earlier "maze shoot 'em up" games such as Tutankham. Jack Palevich, designer of Gauntlet's main inspiration, Dandy (1983), also mentioned being influenced by "half-forgotten" maze-exploration arcade games which contributed the idea of using keys to unlock doors. In 2008, Retro Gamer magazine called Tutankham "an early Gauntlet".

== See also ==
- The Tower of Druaga
