= Cosmic Guerilla =

1979 video game

- German flyer
- Developers: Universal (Arcade); Crystal Computing (Spectrum)
- Platforms: Arcade, ZX Spectrum
- Release: 1979: Arcade; 1983: ZX Spectrum
- Genre: Fixed shooter
- Modes: Single-player, multiplayer

Cosmic Guerilla is a fixed shooter arcade video game developed by Universal and released in 1979. A ZX Spectrum port was published by Crystal Computing in 1983.

== Gameplay ==
The aliens steal shields protecting the player's stock of lives.

Cosmic Guerilla is a two-dimensional fixed shooter game. The player takes control of a laser cannon at the bottom of the screen whose movement is limited to left and right, and must fire at the aliens above. In contrast to Space Invaders the aliens are arranged in a single vertical line on each side of the screen, with their movement being towards the centre, one or more at a time, in an attempt to capture and remove the player's shields. The aliens cannot be hit by the player's shots until they begin to move, and the player may only fire one projectile at a time. Once a row of shields has been removed, one of the player's "lives", is exposed and able to be captured. Occasionally a very fast "mothership" will appear and traverse the screen just above the player dropping bombs.

There are six levels of difficulty along with four game modes allowing combinations of the regular game, bonus enemies, and faster aliens. There is also a two player mode where players take alternative turns.

== Reception ==
Cosmic Guerilla was invariably compared to Space Invaders, though Sinclair User described it as the "next step up", with its different scenarios and object arrangement. Home Computing Weekly, Sinclair User and ZX Computing all praised the game's smooth graphics, though HCU felt that better use could have been made of the sound. The game was generally well received, and described variously as "incredibly addictive" and "very playable", and "highly recommended".
