= 3D-Calc =

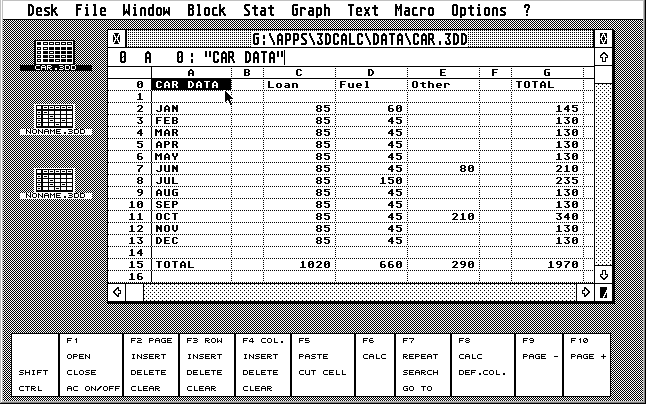
- 3D-Calc screenshot
- Developer(s): Frank Schoonjans
- Initial release: April 1989; 35 years ago
- Stable release: 3.31 / 2003; 22 years ago
- Operating system: Atari ST
- Type: Spreadsheet
- License: Freeware
- Website: www.frankschoonjans.com/3d-calc/

3D-Calc is a 3-dimensional spreadsheet program for the Atari ST computer. The first version of the program was released in April 1989 and was distributed by ISTARI bvba, Ghent, Belgium.

== History ==
Starting in May 1991, the English version was distributed by MichTron/Microdeal, Cornwall, UK.

In January 1992, version 2.3 of the program was licensed to Atari Corp., who released Dutch and French translations.

In 1994, version 3 of 3D-Calc (renamed 3D-Calc+) was licensed to the UK magazine ST Applications.

Today, 3D-Calc software is Freeware ("Public domain without source code") and can be downloaded freely.

In 1992–1993, it was ported to MS-DOS to serve as the basis of a new statistics software package MedCalc.

== Features and reception ==
The spreadsheet contains 13 pages of 2048 rows and 256 columns. Cells of different pages could be cross-referenced. 3D Calc offers a GEM based user interface with icons, menus and function keys. Users can work on three spreadsheets at the same time with up to three GEM windows for each. The application supports on-screen help via the "?" menu and can import data from Lotus 1-2-3 (with some limitations).

The program includes an integrated scripting language, and an integrated text module with a data import feature from the spreadsheet, allowing formatted data output, mailmerge, label printing etc.

Peter Crush writing for the ST Format and ST Applications magazines commended 3D Calc for rich features including easy to use graph generation, but criticized no support for colours.
