= The Warlock of Firetop Mountain (video game) =

1983 video game

- Cover art by Peter Andrew Jones
- Developers: Crystal Computing; Neil Mottershead; Simon Brattel
- Publisher: Puffin Books
- Designers: Neil Mottershead; Simon Brattel
- Series: Fighting Fantasy
- Platform: ZX Spectrum
- Release: UK: 8 December 1983
- Genre: Action
- Mode: Single-player

The Warlock of Firetop Mountain is an action game published by Puffin Books and developed by Crystal Computing in 1983 for the ZX Spectrum home computer. It is loosely based on the adventure gamebook of the same name (the first in the Fighting Fantasy series) written by Steve Jackson and Ian Livingstone, and published by Puffin Books in 1982.

The game was sold both as a regular cassette-only release and as a "software pack" edition that included a copy of the original Fighting Fantasy title at a higher price point.

== Gameplay ==
As a third-person arcade adventure game, the player takes the role of an adventurer on a quest to find the treasure of a powerful warlock, hidden deep within Firetop Mountain. The treasure is stored in a chest with fifteen locks, with the keys guarded by various monsters (e.g. orcs, slime moulds and spiders) in the dungeons of Firetop Mountain. The adventurer (equipped with a bow and a sword) must attempt to retrieve the keys, with an added feature (over the game's predecessor, Halls of the Things) being the ability to open and close doors to block the path of pursuing monsters. Gameplay varies with each new game as the maze is randomly generated.

== Development ==
The Warlock of Firetop Mountain was announced in issue two of Micro Adventurer magazine, which published a feature on the expansion of Penguin Books children's imprint Puffin into the science fiction software market with the video game The Warlock of Firetop Mountain, hoping to emulate the success of the book title. The game was announced as the first in the "Puffin Personal Computer Collection" line together with three other unrelated titles (based on science fiction titles by author Peter K. McBride).

Gameplay: the adventurer (white), monster (purple), randomly generated maze walls (red) and life bar (yellow).

Puffin contracted Crystal Computing, who had developed the fantasy game Halls of the Things, to create the game. According to game designer Simon Brattel, they ended up doing it by accident: they met Steve Jackson, one of the authors of the book, and after their discussion, he became supportive of the project.

According to hidden text within the game's code the developers only had three weeks to complete the project. The Peter Andrew Jones artwork for the original title was used for the video game cover.

Puffin Books briefly continued the trend of adapting the Fighting Fantasy titles into video games, with early titles The Citadel of Chaos and The Forest of Doom being released for the Commodore 64 and ZX Spectrum respectively.

== Reception ==
ZX Computing described the game as simply a "variation" of Halls of the Things, but praised the inclusion of the book as it encouraged children to read. Micro Adventurer also commented on the similarities, stating that "it is so similar that it would be pointless buying both games".

CRASH magazine criticised the control scheme (the number of control keys and the developer's decision to use the horizontally adjacent N and M keys to move the player's character up and down) but also claimed the game less difficult and confusing, and with better graphics. Computer and Video Games expressed disappointment that the game had little resemblance to the original Fighting Fantasy title.
