= The Island (video game) =

1983 video game

- Cover art
- Developer: Crystal Computing
- Publisher: Virgin Games
- Designer: Martyn Charles Davis
- Platform: ZX Spectrum
- Release: EU: 1983
- Genre: Interactive fiction

The Island is a ZX Spectrum text adventure developed and released by Crystal Computing in 1983. The player is the survivor of a plane crash. The aim of the game is to find the valuable treasure and escape from the island.

Watch out for the Red Herring!

== Reception ==
"Compared to similar adventures, The Island is dull stuff with nothing out of the ordinary to recommend it.". Sinclair User

"It seems unlikely that any Spectrum owner will find it fun for more than a few minutes to play this repetitive, text-only adventure, which is filled with the programmer's inane humour". Sinclair Programs
