= Abracadabra! (video game) =

1983 video game

- Advertisement
- Publisher: TG Software
- Platform: Atari 8-bit
- Release: 1983
- Genre: Maze

Abracadabra! is a single screen maze shooter for Atari 8-bit computers published on cartridge by TG Software in 1983. The game is similar in concept to Konami's 1982 Tutankham arcade game.

== Gameplay ==
Gameplay screenshot

The object of Abracadabra! is to face the ultimate test underneath the wizard's castle. The player must navigate 16 levels, collecting the keys and delivering them to the keyholes to reveal the entrance to the next level. The player is perpetually chased by different enemies, including beetles and snakes, which can be vanquished by the player's projectile spell. Additional difficulty is created by constantly moving walls, which will crush the player if he is not careful. There is also a time limit allocated to solve every level.

== Reception ==
In a retrospective review, Polish website retronagazie.eu concluded: "It is not a great hit, but still quite playable. A 'mediocre plus' game and, if one counts in the nostalgia, even a good one". German Atari magazine Zong gave the game a positive review in its November 1992 issue, emphasizing that it can keep the player engaged for long periods of time, especially when played in two-player mode. All in all, the reviewer found the game worth buying.
