= Demon Seed (video game) =

1982 video game

- Publishers: Trend Software (TRS-80); Computer Shack (CoCo)
- Programmers: Jeffrey Sorensen; Philip MacKenzie
- Platforms: TRS-80, TRS-80 Color Computer, Dragon
- Release: 1982: TRS-80; 1983: CoCo
- Genre: Fixed shooter

Demon Seed is a fixed shooter written by Jeffrey Sorensen and Philip MacKenzie for the TRS-80 and published in 1982 by Trend Software. The same programmers developed the TRS-80 Color Computer version published in 1983 by Computer Shack. Demon Seed is a clone of the 1980 arcade game Phoenix.

== Gameplay ==
Demon Seed is a game in which the player uses artillery against rows of attacking birds.

== Reception ==
Dick McGrath reviewed the game for Computer Gaming World, and stated that "Although the concept is not original, it is well executed, with fine graphics and interesting sound. I rate it a 7 out of 10 overall."
