= Airball (video game) =

1987 video game

- Developer: Microdeal
- Publisher: Microdeal
- Designer: Ed Scio
- Platforms: Dragon 32/64, TRS-80 Color Computer, Atari ST, Amiga, Apple IIGS, MS-DOS, Atari 8-bit, Game Boy Advance
- Release: 1987
- Genre: Puzzle

Airball is a video game released in 1987 by Microdeal. It was programmed by Ed Scio, with graphics by Pete Lyon, music by Paul Shields, and level design by Pete Scott. Lyon was the artist for other Microdeal games in the late 1980s, such as Goldrunner. The game was released for the Dragon 32/64 and TRS-80 Color Computer, with ports following for the Atari ST, Amiga, MS-DOS, Atari 8-bit computers, and Game Boy Advance. A port to the Apple IIGS sold fewer than 150 copies. A version for the Nintendo Entertainment System from Novotrade and Tengen was cancelled.

== Gameplay ==
Starting screen (Atari ST)

The player begins every round atop inflating stations. These inflating stations, which are scattered throughout the arenas, also act as checkpoints. Remaining atop an inflating station for too long will cause the player to burst. A bar gauge at the bottom of the screen allows the player to monitor their air level.

Navigating the levels is accomplished with the directional buttons and a jump button. The view is isometric, which can often make complicated movements (such as jumping across gaps or weaving through obstacles) difficult. Points are gathered in the form of gems that appear randomly in rooms. Players pass through the gems for collection.

Airball can ascend stairs by jumping. The surrounding spikes, one of many obstacles found in the game, cause the player to burst. The yellow bar is the amount of air left in the ball, and the three balls in the lower left of the screen indicate the remaining lives.

== Reception ==
Calling Airball "one of the strangest games" he had played, David Plotkin of STart liked its graphics and soundtrack, and recommended it to "those with steady nerves and a sense of adventure".
