= Mr. Dig =

1984 video game

- Publisher: Microdeal
- Programmer: Rita Jay
- Platforms: Atari 8-bit, Commodore 64, Dragon 32/64, TRS-80 Color Computer
- Release: 1984
- Genre: Maze

Mr. Dig is a maze video game programmed by Rita Jay and published in 1984 by Microdeal for the Atari 8-bit computers, Commodore 64, Dragon 32/64, and TRS-80 Color Computer. The game is a direct clone of Universal's 1982 arcade game, Mr. Do!.

== Gameplay ==
Gameplay screenshot (Atari 8-bit)

The object of the game is to guide the titular "Mr. Dig" through a maze by digging tunnels, collecting cherries, and avoiding the various monsters that come out to get him. Mr. Dig can defeat them by hitting them with his bouncing "power ball" or by dropping large apples on them.

There are several types of monsters that try to prevent Mr. Dig from getting the cherries. The least threatening are simply Meanies - small characters that can only chase Mr. Dig. Although their touch is deadly, they can't tunnel behind the players, so they can be led to a dead end and trapped with one of the apples. Meanies can transform into Miners, and these creatures pose a greater threat to Mr. Dig because they can tunnel behind him and eat the apples.

The game allows the player to choose one of ten difficulty levels from "Big Baby's Level" (easy) to "Masochist's Level" (impossible).

=== Audio ===
The game uses excerpts from Mozart's Turkish March as its main musical theme.

== Reception ==
The game has been met with fairly positive reviews. Computer and Video Games reviewer summed up Mr. Dig as "a really nice game from Microdeal, very playable and extremely addictive". The Page 6 reviewer liked the game better than Mr. Do, feeling that it was harder than the latter and thought that Mr. Dig will appeal to a wider range of computer gamers.
