= Cuthbert Goes Digging =

1983 video game

- Developer: Steve Bak (Microdeal)
- Platforms: Dragon 32/64, TRS-80 Color Computer
- Release: 1983

Cuthbert Goes Digging is a 1983 video game for the Dragon 32 home computer. Written by Steve Bak at Microdeal, the game features the hero Cuthbert, who also appears in Cuthbert Goes Walkabout and Cuthbert in the Mines. In the game, the player guides Cuthbert through levels of girders, avoiding 'moronians' fatal to the touch.

The gameplay closely resembles that of Space Panic: Cuthbert defeats moronians by digging holes, causing them to fall through the platforms. On later levels, different-colored moronians are harder to kill and must be knocked through two platforms. Cuthbert also faces a time limit on each level, represented by the amount of oxygen remaining. In addition to trapping enemies, digging holes allows Cuthbert to quickly drop down to lower platforms without using ladders.
