= Cuthbert Goes Walkabout =

1983 video game

- Developer: Microdeal
- Publisher: Microdeal
- Programmer: Steve Bak
- Platforms: Dragon 32/64, TRS-80 Color Computer, Atari 8-bit, Commodore 64
- Release: 1983: CoCo, Dragon; 1984: Atari 8-bit, C64
- Genre: Maze
- Mode: Single-player

Cuthbert Goes Walkabout is a maze video game written by Steve Bak for the Dragon 32/64 and published by Microdeal in 1983. A TRS-80 Color Computer port was released in the same year. Versions for the Atari 8-bit computers and Commodore 64 followed in 1984. The game features the character Cuthbert (who also appeared in Cuthbert Goes Digging, Cuthbert in Space, Cuthbert in the Jungle and Cuthbert in the Mines). The game is based on the Konami arcade game Amidar.

== Gameplay ==
The player guides Cuthbert around a grid-like level of squares. If all the squares are filled, and Cuthbert successfully avoids the monsters and finishes before the time runs out, the player progresses to the next level.
