= Fright Night (video game) =

1988 video game

- Publisher: Microdeal
- Platform: Amiga
- Release: Dec. 1988
- Genre: Horror

Fright Night is a video game published by British software company, Microdeal, for the Amiga. It is based on the American horror comedy movie Fright Night.

== Gameplay ==
The game puts the player in control of Jerry Dandridge, who must explore the rooms of a mansion searching for victims to feed on. The objective is to dispose of all the mansion inhabitants whilst avoiding all the crucifixes that are thrown at the player. Once all victims have been deprived of their blood, the next level will become accessible. A coffin can be used as a regeneration spot once the player runs low on health, although it must be reached before dawn, which ultimately results in a Game Over. Blood that is noxious to the player must be avoided, too, as it can bring him to the same fate.

== Reception ==
Tom Malcom for Info said "The humor of Fright Night is strictly junior-high, but most of us enjoy a little junior-high silliness now and then."

Mark Higham for ST/Amiga Format said "it's unusual to take on the role of the bad guy, and with the sort of visual treat on offer it's certain to be a hit."

Andy Storer for New Computer Express said "Although Fright Night looks and sounds great, its gameplay – and here you have to remember it's a game about biting into necks and drawing blood – sucks."

Duncan Evans for Amiga Computing said "The graphics are excellent and the SFX are nothing short of brilliant – I love the slurping noise when you bite someone, which restores your health incidentally – but the gameplay is very, very shallow."

Amiga User International said "the game falls down on a hopeless lack of originality. Overall, this lacklustre variant on a theme deserves to fail, and I can only hope this talented team will consider very carefully before they embark on another turkey."
