= Dungeons of Daggorath =

- Developer(s): DynaMicro
- Publisher(s): Tandy Corporation
- Designer(s): Douglas J. Morgan
- Platform(s): TRS-80 Color Computer, Dragon 32/64
- Release: 1982
- Genre(s): Dungeon crawl
- Mode(s): Single-player

Dungeons of Daggorath is one of the first real-time, first-person perspective role-playing video games. It was produced by DynaMicro for the TRS-80 Color Computer in 1983. A sequel, Castle of Tharoggad, was released in 1988.

== Gameplay ==
Dungeons of Daggorath was one of the first games that attempted to portray three-dimensional space in a real-time environment, using angled lines to give the illusion of depth. It followed the 1974 games Maze War and Spasim, written for research computers, and the first 3D maze game for home computers, 3D Monster Maze, released in 1981. The game Phantom Slayer, which was released in 1982 for the Color Computer, also featured monsters lurking in a maze. While Daggorath was visually similar to these games, it added several elements of strategy, such as different kinds of monsters, complex mazes, different levels of visibility, and the use of different objects and weapons.

Exploring the dungeons and battling creatures by typing commands into the text area at the bottom. The white bar shows a leather shield in the left hand and a wooden sword in the right hand, and indicates the player's heartbeat. Note the sword on the floor, which can be picked up by the player or other creatures.

The player moves around a dungeon, issuing commands by means of typing – for example, typing "GET LEFT SHIELD" or "USE RIGHT" (or abbreviations such as "G L SH" and "U R"), gathering strength and ever more powerful weapons as the game progresses. Various creatures appear, and can often be heard when they are nearby, even when not visible. The object of the game is to defeat the second of two wizards, who is on the fifth and last level of the dungeon.

A unique feature of the game is a heartbeat which rises as the player moves, takes actions or takes damage within the virtual environment. The heartbeat is a direct predecessor of the "health" indicator in later games; the higher the heart rate, the more vulnerable the player is to attack. The player can faint from overexertion, in which case there is the risk of being attacked while defenseless. This heartbeat system was used instead of numerical statistics such as hit points or vitality, and was inspired by arcade games, specifically 1978's Space Invaders where a heartbeat-like sound gradually increases pace as enemies advance towards the player.

== Development ==
The game was developed by Douglas J. Morgan and Keith S. Kiyohara, with sounds by Phil Landmeier, in 1980–81 for the Tandy (RadioShack) TRS-80 Color Computer. Produced by DynaMicro, it was released in 1983 as an eight kilobyte ROMpak cartridge for the Color Computer, which took several months of recoding to achieve. Despite this, the game features a multi-level maze and has what for the time were advanced sound effects that provide important clues to the locations of monsters.

== Legacy ==
After Dungeons of Daggorath became one of the most popular Color Computer games, Tandy produced a sequel, Castle of Tharoggad, in 1988 which was made without the participation of the Daggorath team. It was poorly received.

Around 2001, Douglas J. Morgan noticed that the exclusive copyright had reverted to him from the publisher RadioShack. He released the game under a freeware-like license to the public, also offering the source code for a small fee. It has been ported by fans to Microsoft Windows, Linux, RISC OS and PSP via the SDL library. A free, open-source version has also been ported to the Web.

Dungeons of Daggorath is a plot point in the book Ready Player One, but it does not appear in the film adaptation.
