= Crystal Computing =

Former British video game developer

Crystal Computing / Design Design
- Industry: Video games
- Founded: 1982; 44 years ago
- Headquarters: Manchester, England
- Products: Halls of the Things; Invasion of the Body Snatchas!

Crystal Computing, later renamed Design Design, was a British video game developer founded in 1982 by Chris Clarke and Ian Stamp while students at the University of Manchester. Graham Stafford, Neil Mottershead, Simon Brattel and Martin Horsley, joined the company as it expanded. The company's first software release was a compilation of games for the Sinclair ZX81, though it was with the ZX Spectrum that Crystal found its greatest success. A deal with the machine's manufacturer Sinclair to distribute Crystal's Zeus Assembler gave the company sufficient funds for a major marketing campaign for their next product, Halls of the Things, an arcade adventure game that became their most successful title.

Clarke left in 1984 to join Artic Software, where he worked on the "business side", before collaborating with Jon Ritman on the Match Day series. With Clarke's departure the company was reorganised as Design Design, a trading name that had been used by Brattel since 1976 for his electronic audio designs. Design Design's core consisted of Stafford working mainly on titles for the Commodore 64, Brattel and Mottershead working on the ZX Spectrum and Amstrad CPC, and David Lewellyn, the company's administrator. According to Stafford the new name was part of a wider re-branding, as they wanted a more professional image, along with a better relationship with the press and the public.

Stafford went on to form developer Walking Circles producing titles including The Living Daylights and Spitting Image for Domark and the PC version of Bloodwych for Image Works.

== Softography ==
Crystal Computing

- ZX81 Games Pack, ZX81, 1982. Includes versions of Asteroids and Space Invaders, as well as a Dungeons & Dragons style adventure game and a slalom skiing game, all designed to run on an unexpanded machine with 1K RAM.
- Merchant of Venus, ZX81, 1982. A space trading/investment game.
- Monitor and Disassembler, ZX81, ZX Spectrum, 1982. An assembly language utility.
- Cosmic Guerilla, ZX Spectrum, 1983
- The Dungeon Master, ZX Spectrum, 1983
- Halls of the Things, ZX Spectrum, Amstrad CPC and Commodore 64, 1983
- Invasion of the Body Snatchas!, ZX Spectrum, 1983
- Zeus Assembler, ZX Spectrum, 1983
- Rommel's Revenge, ZX Spectrum, 1984
- Bug Blaster, ZX Spectrum, 1984. A Centipede clone.
- Cyber Zone, ZX Spectrum, 1984
- The Island, ZX Spectrum, 1984
- The Warlock of Firetop Mountain, ZX Spectrum, 1984
- It's the Wooluf!, ZX Spectrum, 1984.
- Tube Way Army, Dragon 32 and Tandy 32K, 1984

Design Design

- Dark Star, ZX Spectrum and Amstrad CPC, 1984
- Spectacle, ZX Spectrum, 1984 (Additional program supplied with Dark Star - simulated a Teletext environment)
- Return of the Things, ZX Spectrum, 1984
- 2112 AD, ZX Spectrum and Amstrad CPC, 1985
- On the Run, ZX Spectrum and Amstrad CPC, 1985
- Forbidden Planet, ZX Spectrum and Amstrad CPC, 1986
- Halls of the Things Remix, ZX Spectrum, 1986
- Invaders, ZX Spectrum, 1986. A Space Invaders clone published as part of the Action Replay compilation of Crystal and Design Design games.
- N.E.X.O.R., ZX Spectrum and Amstrad CPC, 1986
- Nosferatu the Vampyre, ZX Spectrum, Amstrad CPC and Commodore 64, 1986
- Rogue Trooper, ZX Spectrum, Amstrad CPC and Commodore 64, 1986
- Kat Trap, ZX Spectrum, Amstrad CPC and Commodore 64, 1987
