= Cuthbert in the Mines =

1984 platforming video game

- Developer(s): Microdeal
- Publisher(s): Microdeal; Tandy Corporation
- Platform(s): Dragon 32, TRS-80 Color Computer
- Release: 1984
- Genre(s): Platform

Cuthbert in the Mines (shown on the title screen as Cuthbert in the Mine) is a platform game for the Dragon 32 home computer published by Microdeal in 1984. It stars Cuthbert, a character who appeared in other releases, including Cuthbert Goes Walkabout and Cuthbert Goes Digging. The gameplay is based on Frogger, but with a vertical playfield. Tandy Corporation licensed it for the TRS-80 Color Computer.

== Plot ==
The player guides Cuthbert from hell through levels of mines while avoiding railcars and the fireball-throwing devil.
