= The Warlock of Firetop Mountain (board game) =

Board game

The Warlock of Firetop Mountain is a Games Workshop adventure board game published in 1986, based on the Fighting Fantasy gamebook The Warlock of Firetop Mountain. The game can be played by 2-6 players. A typical game has a length of two hours.

== Gameplay ==
The game consists of the players roaming a labyrinth, where they fight creatures and find treasures. The players have three basic scores which affect combat and how a player can react to traps: SKILL, STAMINA and LUCK, mirroring the system in the original gamebook. To win, the players travel across the game board to where the dungeon ends and open the treasure chest of the evil warlock Zagor. However, whilst doing this the players must work out the combination involving three keys that will allow them access to the treasure chest and obtain these keys, either by finding or stealing them. Players do this by using a system similar to Cluedo, asking other players whether they have key cards showing a particular number and secretly noting the answer given.

=== Components ===
The contents of the game are:

- A large six-piece playing board
- Six plastic playing figures which represent the players
- Fifteen full-colour Key Challenge cards which contain clues
- Sixty-six (although the box states the number is seventy-seven) full-colour Encounter Pieces representing monsters, traps and treasures
- Six Maze cards
- A pad of Adventure Sheets
- A small rulebook
- A Monster Reference card
- 2 six-sided dice

=== Victory conditions ===
The first player to deduce the correct key combination of the Warlock's treasure chest, obtain those keys and open the chest is the winner.

== Production history ==
In 1982, the British game designer Steve Jackson (not to be confused with the American game designer of the same name) and Ian Livingstone created the first Fighting Fantasy book, The Warlock of Firetop Mountain. Four years later, Jackson designed the game. The box was illustrated by Peter Andrew Jones and the interior illustrations were created by Dave Andrews.

== Reception ==
In the November 1986 edition of White Dwarf (Issuer #83), Robert Neville assured players that "There's nothing childish or simple about this game! It requires deduction, determination, some skill, and quite a bit of luck to get all the way to the end without losing your character." He liked the game components as well, stating "Production quality is up to GW's increasingly excellent standards, with fairly clear rules and some very pretty pieces." He did wish that zip-lock bags had been provided for counter storage, but concluded with a recommendation, saying, "On the whole this game is very neat and stylish, and deserves to do well. The slight resemblance to Cluedo is actually no bad thing, as it adds a degree of depth that most dungeon-bashing boardgames have never had. The Warlock of Firetop Mountain is the sort of boardgame I'd probably buy for my little brother and end up playing myself!"

Andi Lennon gave a retrospective review for the website There Will Be Games, and found it very reflective of games of the 1980s in its style of play — "Defiantly and unapologetically a product of its era." Lennon especially admired its components, commenting, "The artwork, although stymied by the minuscule scale of the cards, is awesome. The sculpts of the plastic minis are squat and static in just the right way. The whole package has a certain allure to it." He concluded that while it did not measure up to more modern games, "The fact that this one didn’t receive the same new edition and iteration treatment as Talisman, Dungeonquest and other titles of its vintage ilk is pretty telling, but by remaining trapped in amber it perhaps does a better job of encapsulating and defining an era [...] And while it might fail as game in 2020, as a collector’s piece, curio, slice of history, and a tattered box of object d’art, it’s nigh-on essential."

== Reviews ==
- Isaac Asimov's Science Fiction Magazine v12 n9 (1988 09)
- Jeux & Stratégie #43

== See also ==
- Fighting Fantasy
- The Warlock of Firetop Mountain
- List of Fighting Fantasy gamebooks
