= Kids on Keys =

1983 educational video game

- Developer: Spinnaker Software
- Publisher: Spinnaker Software
- Designer: Freeda Lekkerkerker
- Platforms: Atari 8-bit, Commodore 64, MS-DOS, TRS-80 Color Computer, VIC-20, ZX Spectrum
- Release: 1983
- Genre: Educational

Kids on Keys is a 1983 educational video game from Spinnaker Software designed by Freeda Lekkerkerker.

== Gameplay ==
The game contains three minigames to teach young players basic language and typing skills. In the first, players have to type the correct falling letter before it hits the ground. The second sees the player type the full name of household items before the words reach the bottom of the screen. The third sees names of objects appear at the bottom of the screen, while a series of pictorial icons appear in the center, with the players tasked to press the number on their keyboard that corresponds to that object's icon.

== Development ==
Spinnaker president David Seuss explained that the intention of the program was not to teach typing; rather it was to promote "keyboard familiarity", teaching kids how to reach all the keys and to type faster. Lekkerkerker wanted the game to challenge players who wanted to advance beyond using a joystick while gaming.

== Reception ==
Kids on Keys entered the Billboard charts for Top Educational Computer Software at #8 on February 9, 1985. By this time the game had sold over 150,000 copies, and had been successful during the 1983 and 1984 holiday seasons.

Texas Monthly thought the game was "imaginative", and a decent rote-learning game, adding that along with Early Games it offered a great first computing experience for young gamers. Ahoy! said that Kids on Keys was "a positive step" in teaching children typing, but criticized the bonus round as "indecipherable semi-graphics".
