= Pinball Factory =

1986 video game

- Atari ST box art
- Publishers: Microdeal (ST); MichTron (CoCo)
- Programmer: Kary McFadden
- Artists: Harry Lafnear ("Wild Fire"); Douglas W. Frayer (v1.1 tables)
- Platforms: Atari ST, TRS-80 Color Computer
- Release: 1986
- Genre: Pinball
- Modes: Single-player, multiplayer

Pinball Factory is a pinball video game released in 1986 for the Atari ST and TRS-80 Color Computer. The game allows users to create, save, and play their own pinball game layouts.

== Gameplay ==
Atari ST version

After loading the game, a table called "Wild Fire" is shown. The game can be edited using a palette of 16 colours and a set of predefined targets, bumpers, rubbers, and other items. A single pair of flippers is in a fixed position, and no further flippers can be added. Tables can be designed with two- or three-ball multiballs. The 16 colours used can be selected from 512 variations; ten brushes can be used. A logo for the table could also be edited.

Physical characteristics can be altered, including gravity, elasticity, speed, bumper strength, and extra ball rules.

The game can be controlled with a keyboard, or the mouse can be used to control the flippers. Up to four players can play, and its possible to nudge the table in three directions. A thirteen page manual is included.

After the initial release, a 1.1 version released adding three further tables.

The pinball data files of the TRS-80 version are stored in a special format. Up to 90 objects could be placed on the playfield.

== Reception ==
Reception

Review scores
| Publication | Score |
|---|---|
| Atari ST User | AST: 8/10 |
| Aktueller Software Markt | AST: 32/40 |
| Tilt | AST: 19/24 |
| The Rainbow | TRS-80: 4/5 |

Reviewing the Atari ST version, Pinball Player found that attempting to save the game when the disk is full didn't save the game and gave no error message. It was found to have a good set of drawing tools and was characterized as a drawing program with pinball attached. The program gave no indication of what added to the score, and summed it up as "A frustrating package and one to be avoided at all cost!" Atari ST User rated the game generally more favourably, although rated the sound at 3/10. Antic compared the game to Pinball Construction Set, noting that Pinball Factory had better graphics, but lacked several features present in Pinball Construction Set including the ability to move and add flippers. CVG praised the customization options, recommending it for pinball fans.

The Rainbow reviewed the TRS-80 CoCo version noting the animation was good and mostly flicker-free, with the sound effects adequate but not diverse. The creation of custom pinball games was found to be excellent, although ramps and additional flippers were not options.
