= Phantom Slayer (video game) =

1982 video game

- Developer(s): Med Systems
- Publisher(s): Microdeal
- Designer(s): Ken Kalish
- Platform(s): Dragon 32/64, TRS-80 Color Computer
- Release: 1982
- Genre(s): Maze, first-person shooter
- Mode(s): Single-player

Phantom Slayer is a video game released by Med Systems Software in 1982 for the TRS-80 Color Computer and Dragon 32/64. Written by Ken Kalish, Phantom Slayer has been cited as an early forerunner of the modern first-person shooter genre.

== Gameplay ==
The player moves around a randomly generated maze, attempting to kill the eponymous phantoms by shooting them. As each level is cleared, a new maze is created, and the phantoms became harder (requiring more shots) to kill.

The game combines a relatively sedate pace and a then-rare first-person point of view (using simple fixed-perspective graphics) to produce high levels of dramatic tension for a game on such primitive hardware. As the player moves around the maze, the only indication that a phantom is encroaching is an ominous sound played when the phantom is a few squares away from the player's position. The player can adjust the setting for the audio range finder to indicate the phantom's presence at close or further number of squares to help locate the phantom.

A power-up time is required for the player's weapon, leading to the player holding a position in order to charge the weapon while stalking (or being stalked). The phantoms can take multiple hits (usually two). Combined with their creepy ability to get in close and blind-side the player, this is effective for elevating the fear factor.

== See also ==
- Dungeons of Daggorath
