= Early Games =

1982 educational video game

- Developer: Springboard Software
- Publisher: Counterpoint Software
- Platforms: Apple II, Atari 8-bit, Commodore 64, IBM PC, Mac, TRS-80, TRS-80 Color Computer
- Release: 1982: Atari 8-bit 1983: Apple II, C64, TRS-80, CoCo; 1984: IBM PC; 1986: Mac
- Genre: Educational
- Mode: Single-player

Early Games (shown as Early Games for Young Children on the title screen) is an educational video game by Counterpoint Software and Springboard Software and released for Atari 8-bit computers in 1982. It was designed by John Paulson. The game contains educational mini-games targeted at preschoolers and designed to teach basic math, language, and logic skills. It was part of the Skill Builder series, along with Fraction Factory, Match Maker, and Piece of Cake.

== Reception ==
Title screen

By April 6, 1985, Early Games had maintained an 18-week streak on the Billboard charts for Top Educational Software. After dropping off the charts the following week, it re-entered at #5 on April 20, 1985. By August of that year, the game would spend a total of 36 weeks on the charts, then sitting at #3. On May 3, 1986, the game re-entered the charts again, at #8.

PC Magazine negatively compared Early Games for Young Children's graphics to those of competing title My Letters, Numbers, and Words, through it praised the user friendliness of the former's menu, ultimately giving the program a score of 10.5/18. My Letters, Numbers, and Words received a score of 14.5/18 by comparison. Texas Monthly thought the game was "easy to operate", and added that both the game and Kids on Keys (from Spinnaker Software) were great options to serve as first experiences for young players to have with computers. InfoWorld's Essential Guide to Atari Computers recommended Early Games and Fraction Factory among educational software for the Atari 8-bit.
