= Springboard Software =

Publisher of educational software

- Industry: Educational software
- Founded: 1982
- Fate: Merged
- Successor: Spinnaker Software
- Headquarters: Minneapolis, Minnesota, United States

Springboard Software, Inc. was a software company founded in 1982 known primarily for its line of non-curriculum based educational software. It was bought by Spinnaker Software in 1990.

== Software ==
- Early Games for Young Children (1982: Atari 8-bit, 1983: Apple II, Commodore 64, TRS-80 CoCo, 1984: MS-DOS, 1986: Macintosh)
- Fraction Factory (1984: Apple II, Commodore 64, MS-DOS)
- Easy as ABC (1984: Apple II, Commodore 64, MS-DOS, Macintosh)
- Quizagon (1984: Commodore 64)
- Stickers (Apple II, Commodore 64, MS-DOS)
- Puzzle Master (Apple II)
- Rainbow Painter (Apple II, Commodore 64)
- Mask Parade (Apple II, MS-DOS)
- Piece of Cake Math (1983: Apple II, Atari 8-bit, Commodore 64, MS-DOS)
- Graphics Expander vol. 1 (Apple II, Commodore 64, MS-DOS)
- Certificate maker (1986)
  - Certificate Library vol. 1
  - Certificate Expander vol. 1
- The Newsroom (1984: Apple II, MS-DOS, 1985: Commodore 64, 1987: Atari 8-bit)
  - The Newsroom Pro (1988)
  - Clip Art Collection vol. 1
  - Clip Art Collection vol. 2
  - Clip Art Collection vol. 3
- Springboard Publisher (1987: Apple II, MS-DOS, 1989: Macintosh)
  - Springboard Publisher Style Sheets - Newsletters
  - Springboard Publisher Laser Driver
  - Springboard Publisher Fonts
  - Works of Art Assortment Series
  - Works of Art Education Series
  - Works of Art Holiday Series
- Top Honors (Macintosh)
- Works of Art Laser Fonts vol. 1 (Macintosh)
- Works of Art Laser Art Business Selection vol. 1 (Mac)
- Works of Art Samplers (Apple II, MS-DOS, Macintosh)
- Art a la Mac Volume I and Volume II (Macintosh)
- Family Matters (Apple II, MS-DOS, Macintosh)
- Atlas Explorer (Apple II, MS-DOS, Macintosh)
- Hidden Agenda (1988: MS-DOS, Macintosh)
