= The Dallas Quest =

1984 video game

- Publishers: Tandy; Datasoft; U.S. Gold
- Programmer: James Garon
- Artists: Joe Person; Kelly Day
- Writers: Louella Lee Caraway; Phyllis Wapner
- Platforms: Apple II; Atari 8-bit; Commodore 64; TRS-80 Color Computer
- Release: 1984
- Genre: Graphic adventure
- Mode: Single-player

The Dallas Quest is a graphic adventure game based on the television soap opera Dallas. The game was programmed by James Garon for the TRS-80 Color Computer and published by Tandy Corporation in 1984. It was the second game in the "Animated Adventure" series, following The Sands of Egypt, and uses the same split-screen display. Datasoft published versions for the Apple II, Atari 8-bit computers, and Commodore 64 in the same year.

The player takes the role of a detective. After an initial sequence at Southfork Ranch, the setting moves to South America, and the game has little to do with the TV show.

== Development ==
Lorimar Productions, the studio that produced Dallas, licensed the rights to its characters to Datasoft and provided a script by two "screenwriter's assistants" for the show. James Garon adapted the script into a text adventure game, with graphics provided by professional artists.

== Reception ==
A five star Your Commodore review praised the graphics as some of the best in the genre, though they "take a long time to be reproduced." The reviewer disliked the sparse use of music and was not impressed with the music that does exist. Overall, it was called "one of the best games out on the CBM 64."

Arnie Katz concluded a 1984 Electronic Games review with, "Once you get past the fact that Dallas Quest isn't very closely tied to the show, it turns out to be somewhat entertaining and reasonably challenging."
