= Sanyo MBC-550 series =

Personal computer series

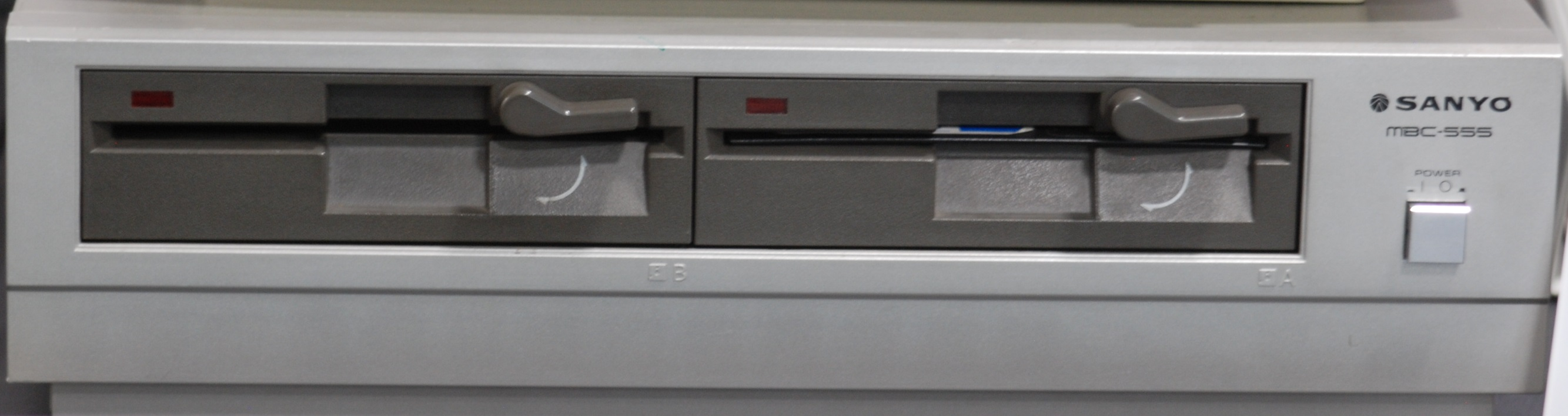
- Sanyo MBC-555 on display at the Living Computer Museum
- Developer: Sanyo Electric
- Type: Personal computer
- Released: March 1984
- Lifespan: 1984–1988
- Introductory price: <$1000
- Discontinued: 1988
- Units sold: 10,000+
- Operating system: MS-DOS 2.11 (optional: CP/M 86, Concurrent CP/M-86)
- CPU: Intel 8088 at 3.58 MHz
- Memory: 128 KB
- Removable storage: floppy disks
- Display: RGB Color Monitor CRT-70; Monochrome Monitor CRT-36; 40×25 or 80×25 text modes; 144×200, 576×200 or 640×200 graphic modes with 8 colors
- Graphics: HD46505 CRTC, RGB graphics adapter
- Sound: Buzzer (single buzztone sound, fixed duration)
- Input: Keyboard
- Controller input: Apple compatible Joystick
- Connectivity: 1 parallel port
- Power: 120 V AC (North American model)
- Dimensions: 380 × 112 × 360 mm
- Predecessor: MBC-1000

The MBC-550 series, also known as the MBC-550/555, is a series of personal computers sold by Sanyo. It was unveiled at the COMDEX/Spring '83 in April 1983 and first released to market in March 1984. All models in the MBC-550 series featured pizza-box-style cases and Intel 8088 microprocessors and run versions of MS-DOS. On its release in 1984, the MBC-550 was the least expensive IBM PC compatible released to date, at a price of US$995 (equivalent to $3,080 in 2025). The MBC-550 series followed Sanyo's MBC-1000 line of CP/M computers.

== Specifications ==
The MBC-550 has much better video display possibilities than the CGA card (based on the HD46505 CRTC, providing a 3-bit RGB palette of 8 colors at 640 × 200 resolution, vs CGA's 4 colors at 320 × 200 or 2 colors at 640 × 200). Other resolutions, like 144 × 200 and 576 × 200 were possible. This display was not completely compatible with the IBM PC.

The computer lacks a standard BIOS, having only a minimal bootloader in ROM that accesses hardware directly to load a RAM-based BIOS. The diskette format (FM rather than MFM) used is not completely compatible with the IBM PC, but special software on an original PC or PC/XT (but not PC/AT) can read and write the diskettes, and software expecting a standard 18.2 Hz clock interrupt has to be rewritten.

The MBC-550 was also the computer for NRI training. Starting by building the computer, the NRI promised you would be "qualified to service and repair virtually every major brand of computer". NRI was advertised in Popular Mechanics and Popular Science throughout 1985.

The MBC-550 is less PC compatible than the IBM PCjr. Its inability to use much PC software was a significant disadvantage; InfoWorld reported in August 1985 that Sanyo "has initiated a campaign to sell off" MBC-550 inventory. The company's newer computers were, an executive claimed, 99% PC compatible.

Early MBC-500 machines used true Intel 8088 microprocessors. In late March 1984, Sanyo reached an agreement with Intel to manufacture the 8088 in Japan as a second source, prompted by a widespread chip shortage at the time. As part of the agreement with Intel, Sanyo was not to sell their 8088 chips except as part of their Sanyo MBC-550 series computers.

== Software ==
There are 6 known commercial games for Sanyo MBC-550

Title	Year	Publisher
Cashman	1984	Michtron
DC-10	198?	Molimerx, Ltd.
Demon Seed	1984	Michtron
Emperor	198?	Molimerx, Ltd.
King Arthur	198?	Molimerx, Ltd.
Time Bandit	1984	Michtron

== Dedicated magazine ==
Soft Sector was a magazine for people who owned Sanyo MBC-550 and 555 DOS computers. (But much of the content equally applied to most IBM clones at the time.) A typical issue includes news, reviews, how-to's, technical advice and education, tips and tricks, as well as BASIC language programs that one could type in and adapt to suit one's needs.

== Models ==
- MBC-550 – One 5.25-inch disk drive (160 KB)
- MBC-555 – Two 5.25-inch disk drives (160 KB)
- MBC-550-2 – One 5.25-inch disk drive (360 KB)
- MBC-555-2 – Two 5.25-inch disk drives (360 KB)
- MBC-555-3 – Two 5.25-inch disk drives (1.2 MB)
