= Dragon User =

- August 1984 cover
- Editor: Helen Armstrong
- Publisher: Sunshine Publications (1982 - June 1988); Dragon Publications (June 1988 - January 1989)
- First issue: 1982
- Final issue: January 1989
- Country: United Kingdom
- Based in: London, England
- Language: English
- ISSN: 0265-0177
- OCLC: 499673684

Dragon User was a British magazine for users of the Dragon 32/64 computers published from 1982 by Sunshine Publications. Production of the computers themselves had ceased by 1985 but the user community remained sufficiently active to justify the magazine's continuation until 1989.

== Publication ==
From its launch until June 1986, Dragon User appeared on the shelves of major newsagents such as WHSmith in a full-colour glossy picture cover. A number of different editors were involved during this initial period, including Brendon Gore, Martin Croft and John Cook. From July 1986, the magazine was available only by subscription and the cover changed to a simple red and black print with a contents listing on the front. Hereafter, Dragon User was edited by Helen Armstrong. In June 1988, publication moved from Sunshine at Little Newport Street, London to Dragon Publications, an operation set up by software producer Bob Harris specifically to continue the magazine. Helen Armstrong remained Editor. This new venture did not last long, however. By the new year, only 1450 or so of the subscribers had renewed compared to about 2400 the year before. Insufficient money was available to send any further issues to print and so the final Dragon User was the January 1989 issue. Harris seemed genuinely surprised by the sudden lack of interest and his final editorial column (which he worked closely with Armstrong to write) was a slightly bitter apology to the remaining user base, urging them to support the National Dragon Users Group (NDUG) and the other remaining independent Dragon publications. With a intention to pass on unpublished contributions to "Dragon Update" it was ended with a signature and Helen [Amstrong].

== Content ==
Dragon User followed a fairly standard model for computer magazines of the time: news, software and book reviews, technical Q+A, a number of regular columns and many program listings (in those days it was common for magazines to print the text of programs written in BASIC to be laboriously typed in by the reader). Special features, such as interviews with prominent figures in the software world were also quite common and of course there were many advertisements, mostly for Microdeal, the largest Dragon software producer.

Before November 1984, the software reviews were in the form of a continuous column written by John Scriven. Thereafter, the reviews appeared in a section called "Dragonsoft" where each program was reviewed separately and given a score of 1 to 5 Dragons. Various writers contributed reviews from then on, most notably Jason Orbaum, but also established Dragon programmers like Pam D'Arcy and Roy Coates.

== Regular Columns ==
- Bob Liddil's Magic Software Machine (Launch-June 1984) - a fantastical account of a user's adventures with his talking computer
- Mike Gerrard's Adventure Trail (August 1984 - January 1989) - Reviews and tips for text adventures, a popular genre of the time. The column was eventually taken over by Mike's brother Pete
- Expert's Arcade Arena (May 1986 - January 1989) - tips and cheats for realtime interactive games from an anonymous "expert" who was, in reality, Jason Orbaum.
- Dragon Answers (Launch-January 1989) - technical questions and answers by Brian Cadge
- Competition (Launch-January 1989) - a mathematical puzzle (to be solved by a program written in Dragon BASIC) posed by Gordon Lee. The May 1984 puzzle turned out to be of great mathematical interest and was further explored by Scientific American
