= Goldrunner =

1987 video game

- Developer: Microdeal
- Programmer: Steve Bak
- Artist: Pete Lyon
- Composer: Rob Hubbard
- Platforms: Atari ST, Amiga
- Release: 1987
- Genre: Scrolling shooter
- Modes: Single-player, multiplayer

Goldrunner is a vertically scrolling shooter developed by Steve Bak and Pete Lyon for the Atari ST and published by Microdeal in 1987. Rob Hubbard composed the music. An Amiga version followed, as well as a 1988 sequel, Goldrunner II.

== Gameplay ==
Goldrunner is a vertically scrolling shooter where it is possible to fly back and forth freely as in Defender. The player steers a golden spaceship equipped with two laser cannons, flying over huge ring worlds whose structures must be destroyed. The ship has a speed booster to accelerate.

== Legacy ==
The immediate follow-on, Goldrunner II, offered a similar aesthetic to the original title. A third entry in the series was planned, entitled Goldrunner 3D. This was to mark a departure from the traditional 2D scrolling shooter format with a radical new look and gameplay. Trailed as early as 1989, the project suffered significant delays however, finally seeing release under Ocean as Epic in 1992.

== Reception ==
Rich Teverbaugh of Antic in November 1988 praised Goldrunner II's "flawless execution" and "twist" unusual gameplay. While criticizing the skimpy documentation, he concluded that it "is a worthwhile addition to the library of any gamer who yearns for something different".
