= Time Bandit =

1983 video game

- Publisher: MichTron
- Designers: Bill Dunlevy; Harry Lafnear
- Programmers: TRS-80, Atari ST; Bill Dunlevy; Harry Lafnear; Amiga, MS-DOS; Timothy Purves
- Platforms: TRS-80, TRS-80 Color Computer, Dragon 32, Atari ST, Amiga, MS-DOS
- Release: 1983: TRS-80, Color Computer; 1985: Atari ST; 1988: Amiga; 1989: MS-DOS
- Genres: Maze, shoot 'em up
- Mode: Single-player

Time Bandit is a maze shoot 'em up written for the TRS-80 Model I by Bill Dunlevy and Harry Lafnear and published by MichTron in 1983. It was ported to the TRS-80 Color Computer and Dragon 32, but enjoyed its greatest popularity several years later as an early release for the Atari ST. It was also released for the pseudo-PC-compatible Sanyo MBC-55x with 8-color display. Amiga and MS-DOS versions were ported by Timothy Purves.

== Gameplay ==
In each overhead-view level, the player must gather keys to open locks which allow access to the exit. Between levels, the player chooses the next level from one of 16 "Timegates", each leading to a different world. These worlds must be completed sixteen times, getting progressively more difficult than the last. The worlds vary in character and difficulty. Some worlds incorporate elements of text adventure games, and most contain gameplay references to other popular games of the time, such as Pac-Man and Centipede. In addition to the primary objective of exiting each level, optional side quests become available in the later stages of some worlds, usually awarding the player with one of several "artifacts" upon completion.

The game also features a "Duel Mode" for two players. In this mode, a split screen is used for simultaneous play in the same worlds, allowing direct cooperation or combat between players.

== Development ==
According to Harry Lafnear, Time Bandit was based on Konami's 1982 arcade game Tutankham and was originally called Pharaoh. The Atari ST and Amiga versions have visual similarities to Gauntlet, but Gauntlet was released in late 1985 after development of Time Bandit was complete. According to Lafnear, he found out about Gauntlet from friends who saw it at an arcade and called it "a Time Bandit clone". However, he believes neither game copied each other, but that the similarities stem from earlier "maze shoot 'em ups" such as Tutankham.

== Reception ==
Lafnear estimates that 75,000 copies were sold, mostly for the Atari ST.

Jerry Pournelle of BYTE named Time Bandit his game of the month for September 1986, stating that the ST version "is the best arcade-type computer game I have ever seen". The game was well received by reviewers in Antic, COMPUTE!, and BYTE for its gameplay and graphics, though reviews also noted that the game includes no music and has minimal sound effects.

The Amiga version of the game was reviewed in 1990 in Dragon #158 by Hartley, Patricia, and Kirk Lesser in "The Role of Computers" column. The reviewers gave the game 4 1/2 out of 5 stars.

== Legacy ==
The Timelord's Handbook, a clue book and companion manual for the game, was released in March 2010 by Harry Lafnear, one of the original authors of the game. In addition to game clues, the book includes background fiction and profiles on the game's history and creators.
