= Spectral Associates =

- Founded: 1980
- Founder: Thomas Rosenbaum
- Defunct: Late 1980s
- Fate: Defunct
- Headquarters: 3418 South 90th Street, Tacoma, WA 98049 and 4633 South 348th Street, Auburn WA 98001
- Products: Computer Games

Spectral Associates was an American maker of computer games for the TRS-80 Color Computer. It was founded in 1980 and went defunct sometime in the late 1980s. Spectral Associates sold their software through Radio Shack and via direct sales. It was a very prolific game company for the TRS-80 Color Computer I and II in its heyday.

== Software Publications ==
=== Computer Games ===
- Cave Walker (1986, via Tandy Corporation)
- Color Meteoroids 1.6 (1981)
- Color Space Invaders 1.4 (1981)
- Color Space War (cassette)
- Cubix
- Decathlon
- Froggie
- Galagon
- Ghost Gobbler (cassette/disk)
- Ice Castles
- Interbank Incident (1985–1987)
- Lancer (1983, cassette/disk)
- Lunar Rover 1
- Lunar Rover Patrol (1983, cassette/disk)
- Keys of the Wizard (cassette)
- Madness and the Minotaur (1982, cassette)
- Maze Escape (32K and above, cassette)
- Module Man
- Ms. Gobbler (cassette/disk)
- Pegasus and the Phantom Riders (1985–1987)
- Pengon (cassette)
- Piggy (cassette)
- Planet Invasion (cassette)
- Qix
- Realm of Nauga (cassette)
- Roller Controller
- Space Sentry (cassette/disk)
- Springster (1985–1987)
- Storm Arrows (cassette/disk)
- Treasury Pack 1 (disk) - these treasuries included (not necessarily an all-inclusive list): Keys of the Wizard, Lunar Rover Patrol, Cubix, Module Man, Qix, Roller Controller, Pengon, Decathlon, Lancer, Froggie, Galagon, and Lunar Rover 1
- Treasury Pack 2 (disk)
- Whirlybird Run (1982, cassette/disk)

=== Computer Games (Educational) ===
- Alpha Search (educational, cassette/disk)

=== Applications/Utilities ===
- Clone 80cc (cassette)
- RGB Patch (disk)
- Demonstration Program (1986, Radio Shack store demo)
- Holiday Demonstration Program (1986, Radio Shack store demo)

== Miscellaneous Publications ==
=== July 1980 - June 1981 ===
- Introduced a 16K upgrade, ($75.00) an editor/assembler, plus several other utilities and one of the first games: SPACE INVADERS. They were also in the process of developing MAGIC BOX which would enable Model I & III tapes to be loaded into the Color Computer.

=== July 1981 - June 1982 ===
- Color Computer technical manual (book)

=== July 1983 - June 1984 ===
- Color Basic Unravelled II (book)
- Disk Basic Unravelled II (book)
- Extended Basic Unravelled II (book)
- Super Extended Basic Unravelled II (book)

=== Other ===
- The Facts for the TRS-80 Color Computer (book, Copyright (c) 1983, First printing: Nov 1981, Fifth Printing: Jul 1983)
- CoCo 3 Secrets Revealed
