= Simon Brattel =

British hardware and software designer

Simon Brattel is a British hardware and software designer.

He founded Design Design in 1976 as a company name to use on various hardware designs, mainly in the audio field.

When at Crystal Computing he was part of the team that produced the ZX Spectrum game Halls of the Things and the Z80 assembler Zeus. Much of the development was done using homebrew computers.
