= The Sands of Egypt =

1982 video game

- Developer: Datasoft
- Publishers: Datasoft; Tandy
- Designer: James Garon
- Programmers: Color Computer; James Garon; Ralph Burris; Steve Bjork; Atari 8-bit Frank Cohen; Apple II; Brian Mountford
- Platforms: TRS-80 Color Computer, Atari 8-bit, Apple II
- Release: 1982: CoCo, Atari; 1983: Apple
- Genre: Graphic adventure
- Mode: Single-player

The Sands of Egypt is a 1982 graphic adventure game written by James Garon, Ralph Burris, and Steve Bjork of Datasoft for the TRS-80 Color Computer. It was licensed to Tandy Corporation and was the first disk-only game for the Color Computer sold by RadioShack. Ports to Atari 8-bit computers in 1982 and Apple II in 1983 were published by Datasoft. Set in 1893, the game follows a British explorer and archaeologist who is lost in the desert. Text commands are entered in the lower half of the screen, while a sometimes animated image of the current location is displayed in the upper half.

== Plot ==
The player is Sir Percy of Oxford, who relates to Queen Victoria via a letter dated September 30, 1893 that he is the leader of an expedition which located the Tomb of Ra in Egypt. After growing tension and disagreement, the team of archaeologists abandoned Sir Percy during the night, leaving him with only a compass and no water or other supplies.

== Gameplay ==
The player has found a source of water. (Atari 8-bit)

The top half of the screen shows an image of the current location. The player interacts with the game by typing commands in the bottom half, as in an interactive fiction game. Commands are either in a "VERB NOUN" format or single words such as N for "move north". The total number of moves made is tracked as the score and can be displayed via the SCORE command. HELP gives context-sensitive clues. There are nine slots for saving the game accessed with the SAVE and LOAD commands.

The player needs to periodically drink water to stay alive.

== Reception ==
Owen Linzmayer, reviewing the Color Computer original for Creative Computing, wrote "In comparison with other adventures, The Sands of Egypt does feel a bit shallow" and "the game relies strongly on perseverance and patience." In Electronic Games, Tracie Forman didn't mention the puzzles, but wrote "By far the most striking thing about The Sands of Egypt is its eye-pleasing animation" and called it "an exceptional gaming experience."

In a walkthrough of part of the game for TRS-80 Microcomputer News, Bruce Elliott discussed the HELP command:

Unfortunately, it is not always helpful in the immediate situation. I was often told that this was a "DRAINING EXPERIENCE." Standing in the middle of the desert, dying of thirst, this was not exactly what I wanted to read. However, the information ultimately proved a valuable clue.

== See also ==
- The Dallas Quest, similarly styled game from Datasoft
