= Popular Computing Weekly =

Computer magazine published in the UK

- 1 May 1986 issue cover
- Categories: Video game
- Frequency: Weekly
- Format: A4
- Publisher: Sunshine Publications; Focus Publishing
- First issue: 23 April 1982; 42 years ago
- Final issue Number: 14 June 1990; 34 years ago 415
- Country: United Kingdom
- Based in: London
- Language: English
- ISSN: 0265-0509
- OCLC: 476459425

Popular Computing Weekly was a computer magazine in the UK published from 1982 to 1990. It was sometimes referred to as PCW (although that abbreviation is more commonly associated with Personal Computer World magazine).

== Overview ==
The magazine was first published on 23 April 1982. Its subject range was general, covering gaming, business, and productivity software. The founding company was Sunshine Publications based in London and the launch editor was Duncan Scot. During 1989 it incorporated Computer Gamesweek.

It was noteworthy for being the UK's only national weekly computer magazine of the time, and for its back page being dominated by an advertisement in the form of a comic strip, Piman, by the firm Automata UK between the years 1983 and 1986.

A further noteworthy feature of the early editions was the high-quality artwork on the magazine covers. These had disappeared by 1983.

One other noteworthy and regular column was about adventure games, notably text adventures. Reviews and cryptic spoilers were eagerly awaited. Readers who had completed the hugely successful text adventure The Hobbit, first released on the ZX Spectrum were invited to add their names to a "Hobbit Hall of Fame." The magazine folded with issue 415 published in June 1990.
