= List of maze video games =

This is a list of maze video games by type.

== Top-down maze games ==
While the character in a maze would have a limited view, the player is able to see much or all of the maze. Maze chase games are a specific subset of the overhead perspective. They're listed in a separate section.

1959
- Mouse in the Maze, MIT, TX-0 mainframe

1973

- Gotcha, Atari, arcade

1976

- The Amazing Maze Game, Midway, arcade

1977

- Maze, Fairchild, Channel F
- Minesweeper, AmuTec, arcade

1978

- Slot Racers, Atari, Atari 2600
- Take the Money and Run, Magnavox, Odyssey²

1979

- Car Hunt, Sega, arcade
- Head On, Sega/Gremlin, arcade
- Head On 2, Sega/Gremlin, arcade
- Space Chaser, Taito, arcade

1980

- Berzerk, Stern, arcade
- Crazy Balloon, Taito, arcade
- Lupin III, Taito, arcade
- Maze Craze, Atari, Atari 2600
- Spectar, Exidy, arcade
- Tank Battalion, Namco, arcade
- Tranquilizer Gun, Sega, arcade
- Wizard of Wor, Midway, arcade

1981

- 005, Sega, arcade
- A-Maze-Ing, Texas Instruments, TI-99/4A
- The Adventures of Robby Roto!, Bally/Midway, arcade
- Armored Car, Stern, arcade
- The Hand, TIC, arcade
- K-Razy Shoot-Out, CBS Electronics, Atari 8-bit, Atari 5200
- Minotaur, Sirius, Apple II
- Pulsar, Sega, arcade
- Route 16, Tekhan/Sun, arcade
- Thunder Island, ANALOG Software, Atari 8-bit
- Treasure Island, Data East, arcade

1982

- Ali Baba and 40 Thieves, Sega, arcade
- Anteater, Tago, arcade
- Bable Terror, Funsoft, TRS-80
- Blue Print, Bally Midway, arcade
- Dig Dug, Namco, arcade
- Diggerbonk, Atari Program Exchange, Atari 8-bit
- Entombed, U.S. Games, Atari 2600
- Frenzy, Stern, arcade
- Garden Wars, Commodore, VIC-20
- K-Razy Antiks, CBS, Atari 8-bit
- Maze Death Race, PSS, ZX81, ZX Spectrum
- Microwave, Cavalier, Apple II
- Mines of Minos, CommaVid, Atari 2600
- Mr. Do!, Universal, arcade
- Nibbler, Rock-Ola, arcade
- Night Stalker, Mattel, Intellivision
- Pathfinder, Gebelli, Atari 8-bit
- Raid on Fort Knox, Commodore, VIC-20
- Robot Killer, Emerson, Arcadia 2001
- Shamus, Synapse, Atari 8-bit
- Star Maze, Sir-Tech, Apple II
- Talbot, Volt, arcade
- Tax Dodge, Free Fall, Atari 8-bit
- Towering Inferno, US Games, Atari 2600
- Tron: Maze-A-Tron, Mattel, Intellivision
- Tutankham, Konami, arcade
- Zzyzzyxx, Cinematronics, arcade

1983

- Android Two, Vortex, ZX Spectrum, Amstrad CPC
- Ardy the Aardvark, Datamost, Apple II, Atari 8-bit
- The Birds and the Bees II: Antics, Bug-Byte, C64, ZX Spectrum
- Abracadabra!, TG Software, Atari 8-bit
- Bewitched, Imagine, VIC-20
- Bomberman, Hudson Soft, NEC PC-8001, Sharp X1, others
- Bumpomov's Dogs, Atari Program Exchange, Atari 8-bit
- Castle Keeper, ALA Software, Atari 8-bit
- Cavelon, Jetsoft, arcade
- Chack'n Pop, Taito, arcade
- Chase the Chuck Wagon, Spectravision, Atari 2600
- Creepy Corridors, Sierra On-Line, Apple II, Atari 8-bit, others
- Dandy, Atari Program Exchange, Atari 8-bit
- Flappy, DB-SOFT, Sharp X1
- Grabber, Tom Mix, Tandy CoCo
- Intrepid, Nova Games, arcade
- Key-Quest, Micro-ware, VIC-20
- Lady Tut, Spinnaker, Apple II, C64
- Master Miner, Funtastic, IBM PC
- Mazer Blazer, Stern, arcade
- Money Money, Zaccaria, arcade
- Oil's Well, Sierra On-Line, Apple II, Atari 8-bit, others
- Sewermania, Milton Bradley, TI-99/4A
- Space Maze Attack, HAL, MSX
- Splat!, Incentive, ZX Spectrum
- Spy Catcher, ALA Software, Atari 8-bit
- Styx, Bug-Byte, ZX Spectrum
- Time Bandit, MichTron, Tandy CoCo
- Track Attack, Broderbund, Apple II, Atari 8-bit

1984

- 3D Silicon Fish, Thor, VIC-20
- Cybertron Mission, Micro Power, Electron, BBC Micro, C64
- Diamond Mine, MRM Software, Electron, BBC Micro, others
- Fred, Investronica, ZX Spectrum, Amstrad CPC, C64
- Henri, Atari 8-bit, Atari Program Exchange
- Humpty Dumpty Meets the Fuzzy Wuzzies, Artic, C64, ZX Spectrum
- Labyrinth, Acornsoft, BBC Micro
- Maziacs, DK'Tronics, ZX Spectrum, C64, MSX
- Mr. Dig, Computerware, Tandy CoCo
- The Tower of Druaga, Namco, arcade
- Yellow Cab (Kamikaze Cabbie outside of Japan), Data East, arcade

1985

- Cops 'n' Robbers, Atlantis, VIC-20
- Gauntlet, Atari Games, arcade
- Lord of the Orb, Antic Software, Atari 8-bit
- King Tut's Tomb, Antic Software, Atari 8-bit
- Maze War, ANALOG Computing, Atari 8-bit
- Project Future, Micromania, ZX Spectrum, Amstrad CPC
- Raiders5, UPL, arcade
- Wriggler, Devonshire, ZX Spectrum
- Zone X, Gremlin Graphics, Atari 8-bit

1986

- A-Maze, K'Soft, ZX Spectrum
- Aardvark, Bug-Byte, Atari 8-bit, C64
- Gauntlet II, Atari Games, arcade
- Merlin's Money Maze, Zilec, arcade
- Snail Maze, Sega, Master System
- Thunder Castle, Intellivision

1987

- Fast Lane, Konami, arcade
- Phantom, Mastertronic, C64
- Rescue, Mastertronic, ZX Spectrum
- Think Quick!, The Learning Company, Apple II, MS-DOS
- Starbase, Taurus Computing, Tatung Einstein

1988

- Dark Chambers, Atari, Atari 7800, Atari 8-bit

1989

- Colorful Dragon, Sachen, NES
- Cratermaze, Hudson Soft, TurboGrafx-16
- Krazy Mazes, ANALOG Computing, Atari 8-bit
- Tank Action, CP Verlag, C64

1998

- Get Medieval, Monolith, Windows

1999

- Quest: Fantasy Challenge, Sunsoft, Game Boy Color

2003

- Online Bomberman, Hudson Soft, Windows
- The Maze, Winterrowd, Web browser

2008

- The World's Hardest Game, Windows
- The Last Guy, Sony, PS3

2009

- Robot Rescue, Teyon, DSi

2014

- Pix the Cat, Pastagames, Xbox One, PS4, others

2016

- Tomb of the Mask

2021

- Labyrinth City: Pierre the Maze Detective, Darjeeling, Switch, Mac, Windows

== First-person maze games ==
These are games where the player moves through a maze while attempting to reach the exit, sometimes having to avoid or fight enemies. Despite a 3D perspective, the mazes in most of these games have 2D layouts when viewed from above. Some first-person maze games follow the design of Pac-Man, but from the point of view of being in the maze.

First-person maze games are differentiated from more diversified first-person party-based RPGs, dungeon crawlers, first-person shooters, and walking sims by their emphasis on navigation of largely abstracted maze environments.

1973
- Maze, Steve Colley, Imlac PDS-1

1977

- Maze War, Jim Guyton, Alto

1978

- Maze Game, Muse, Apple II
- Escape!, Muse, Apple II

1979

- Ratrun, Code Works, PET

1980

- Deathmaze 5000, Med Systems, TRS-80
- Labyrinth, Med Systems, TRS-80

1981

- 3D Maze, IJK, BBC Micro, Acorn Electron
- 3D Monster Maze, ZX81, ZX Spectrum
- Asylum, Med Systems, TRS-80
- Captivity, PDI, Atari 8-bit
- Space Maze, Program Power, BBC Micro

1982

- 3D Labyrinth, Llamasoft, VIC-20
- 3D Maze, IJK Software, BBC Micro
- Dungeons of Daggorath, Tandy CoCo
- Escape, New Generation, ZX Spectrum
- Escape, Nukefop, VIC-20
- Escape from the Mindmaster, Starpath, Atari 2600
- Maze, Acornsoft, BBC Micro, Acorn Electron
- Monster Maze, Epyx, Atari 8-bit
- Phantom Slayer, Med Systems, Dragon 32, TRS-80
- Spectre, Datamost, Apple II
- Supermaze, Timex, Sinclair 1000, ZX81
- Theseus and the Minotaur, Apple II
- Wayout, Sirius, Atari 8-bit, Apple II, C64

1983

- Alien Maze, CRL Group, ZX Spectrum
- 3-Demon, PC Research, MS-DOS
- Capture the Flag, Sirius, Atari 8-bit, C64
- Caves of Ice, Compute!, Atari 8-bit, Apple II, C64, VIC-20, PET
- Corridors of Genon, New Generation, ZX Spectrum
- Ladder Maze, Superior, BBC Micro
- London Blitz, Avalon Hill, Atari 2600
- Maze Escape, Spectral Associates, Tandy CoCo
- Sultan's Maze, Gem, Dragon 32
- Tunnel Runner, CBS, Atari 2600
- Word Maze, Sord, Sord M5

1984

- 3-D Bomberman, Hudson Soft, MSX, FM-7, NEC PC-6001, others
- 3D Glooper, Supersoft, C64
- 3-D Monster Chase, Romik, ZX Spectrum, Amstrad CPC
- Dedal, Oric-1
- Skull, Games Machine, ZX Spectrum, C64
- Star Maze II, Mastertronic, BBC Micro
- Zig Zag, DK'Tronics, ZX Spectrum

1985

- Gyron, Firebird, ZX Spectrum
- Scarabaeus, Andromeda, C64

1986

- Maze Wars+, Macromind, Mac

1987

- Maze Wars+, MacroMind, Mac
- MIDI Maze, Hybrid Arts, Atari ST

1988

- Slaygon, MicroDeal, Amiga, Atari ST

1989

- Day of the Viper, Accolade, Amiga, Atari ST, MS-DOS

1991

- 3D-Maze, Odin Software, Windows
- Faceball 2000, Bulletproof, Game Boy

1993

- Master of the Maze, Spice Software, Windows
- Super Maze Wars, Callisto Corporation, Mac

1994

- MazeWars, Mike Kienenberger, NeXTSTEP
- Netmaze, M.Hipp, X11
- iMaze, Hans-Ulrich Kiel and Joerg Czeranski, X11
- The Maze, Lynn Alford, Windows

1995

- 3D Maze, Microsoft, Windows
- Amazeing, Happy Puppy, Windows

1996

- Logic Quest 3D, Learning Company, Softkey, Windows

1998

- MazeWars, IndiVideo, Palm OS

2023

- Labyrinthine, Valko, Windows, Xbox S, PS5

== Maze chase games ==
This subgenre is exemplified by Namco's Pac-Man (1980), where the goal is to clear a maze of dots while being pursued. Pac-Man spawned many sequels and clones which, in Japan, are often called "dot eat games". Other maze chases aren't about getting all the dots or items, and the goal is to clear the maze of the pursuers themselves (e.g., Pengo, Jungler).

1979
- Heiankyo Alien, University of Tokyo, PC-88, arcade

1980

- Pac-Man, Namco, arcade
- Rally-X, Namco, arcade

1981

- A-maz-ing, Audiogenic, VIC-20
- Cave Hunter, Mark Data Products, Tandy CoCo
- Chomper, MMG Micro, Atari 8-bit
- Crazy Chicky, VTech, CreatiVision
- Crazy Pucker / Crazy Moonie / Crazy Chewy, VTech, CreatiVision
- Frisky Tom, Nichibutsu, arcade
- Ghost Hunter, arcade Plus, Atari 8-bit
- Gobbler, On-Line Systems, Apple II
- The Hand / Got-Ya, T.I.C., arcade
- Hangly-Man, Nittoh, arcade
- Jawbreaker, On-Line Systems, Atari 8-bit, Apple II
- Jelly Monsters, HAL Labs, VIC-20
- Jungler, Konami, arcade
- Lady Bug, Universal, arcade
- Lock 'n' Chase, Data East, arcade
- Make Trax / Crush Roller, Alpha Denshi, arcade
- Mouse Trap, Exidy, arcade
- Ms. Pac-Man, Bally Midway, arcade
- Muncher, Astrovision, Bally Astrocade
- K.C. Munchkin!, Magnavox, Odyssey²
- Munchyman, Program Power, BBC Micro
- New Rally-X, Namco, arcade
- Pac-Tac, Computerware, Tandy CoCo
- Packri Monster, Bandai, Handheld
- Piranha, GL, arcade
- Radar Rat Race, Commodore, VIC-20
- Round-Up, Centuri, arcade
- Scarfman, Cornsoft, TRS-80
- Snoggle, Broderbund, Apple II
- Taxman, HAL Labs, Apple II
- Thief, Pacific Novelty, arcade
- Turtles, Konami, arcade

1982

- Alien, 20th Century Fox, Atari 2600
- Dung Beetles, Datasoft, Apple II, Tandy CoCo, Atari 8-bit
- Baby Pac-Man, Bally Midway, arcade
- Byte-Man, Mindseye, ZX81
- CatChum, Kaypro, CP/M
- Cat Trax, Emerson, Arcadia 2001
- Changes, Orca, arcade
- Clean Sweep, GCE, Vectrex
- Cosmic Cruncher, Commodore, VIC-20
- Crazy Mazey, Datamost, Apple II
- Devil Fish, Arctic, arcade
- Doodle Bug, Computerware, Tandy CoCo, Dragon 32
- Eyes, Rock-Ola, arcade
- Gobble a Ghost, CDS Micro Systems, ZX Spectrum
- Gulpman, Campbell Systems, ZX Spectrum
- Hard Hat, Exidy, arcade
- Hot Lips, London Software, Atari 8-bit
- Hungry Horace, Beam, ZX Spectrum, C64, Dragon 32
- Labyrinth, Broderbund, Apple II, Atari 8-bit
- Lochjaw / Shark Attack, Games by Apollo, Atari 2600
- Looper, Orca, arcade
- Mazeman, Abersoft, ZX81, ZX Spectrum
- Money Munchers, Datamost, Apple II
- Mouskattack, On-Line Systems, Atari 8-bit, Apple II
- Munch Man, Texas Instruments, TI99-4A
- Muncher!, Silversoft, ZX Spectrum
- Munchmaid!, Wunderware, VIC-20
- Pac Droids, Programmer's Guild, Tandy CoCo
- Pack Maze, DSL Computer Products, Tandy CoCo
- Pack'n Boy, PSK, PC-88, others
- Pakacuda, Rabbit, C64
- PC-Man, Orion, IBM PC
- Pengo, Sega, arcade
- Pig Pen, Datamost, Apple II
- Serpentine, Broderbund, Apple II
- Snack Attack, Datamost, Apple II
- Snack Attack II, Funtastic, IBM PC
- Snapper, Acornsoft, BBC Micro, Acorn Electron
- The Snapper, Silicon Valley Systems, Atari 8-bit
- Spec Man, Jega, ZX Spectrum
- Streaking, Shoei, arcade
- Spookyman, Abbex, ZX Spectrum
- Super Pac-Man, Namco, arcade
- Super Taxman 2, HAL Labs, Apple II
- VIC-Men, Bug-Byte, VIC-20
- VikMan, Nukefop, VIC-20
- Zuckman, DJL Software, ZX81

1983

- 3D Munchy, MRM Software, BBC Micro
- Alien's Return, ITT Family Games, Atari 2600
- Bank Heist, 20th Century Fox, Atari 2600
- Bootleg, Atari Program Exchange, Atari 8-bit
- Botanic, Valadon, arcade
- Caterpiggle, APX, Atari 8-bit
- Chomper Man, Victory, C64
- Crazy Bugs!, AMA, ZX Spectrum
- Crystals of Zong, Cymbal, C64
- Crystal Castles, Atari, arcade
- Cyclops, Romik, Tandy CoCo
- Dot Gobbler, Mr. Computer Products, C64
- Drelbs, Synapse, Atari 8-bit, C64
- Felix and the Fruit Monsters, Micro Power, Acorn Electron, BBC Micro
- Getaway!, Atari Program Exchange, Atari 8-bit
- Ghost Hunt, PSS, ZX Spectrum
- Ghost's Revenge, Micromania, ZX Spectrum
- Gnasher, R&R Software, ZX Spectrum, Commodore 16, Plus/4
- Gobble A Ghost, CDS Microsystems, ZX Spectrum
- Guzzler, Tehkan, arcade
- Hover Bovver, Llamasoft, C64, Atari 8-bit
- Jawbreaker II, On-Line Systems, Atari 8-bit, Apple II, others
- Jr. Pac-Man, Bally Midway, arcade
- Marvin's Maze, SNK, arcade
- Maze Chase, Hewson, ZX Spectrum
- Maze Man, Creative Equipment, C64
- Miss Gobbler, Spectral Associates, Tandy CoCo
- Monster Munch, Atlantis, C64
- Mouser, IBM, IBM PCjr
- Munch Man 64, Solar Software, C64
- Pacar, Sega, arcade
- Pacmania, Mr. Chip, VIC-20, C64
- Pac Rabbit, International Publishing & Software, ZX81
- Plaque Man, HCS, Atari 8-bit, C64
- Power Blaster, Romik, VIC-20
- Preppie! II, Adventure International, Atari 8-bit
- Rubbish Monster, Data Becker, C64
- Scooby Doo's Maze Chase, Mattel, Intellivision
- Scrambled Egg, Technos, arcade
- Snakman, Microdigital, VIC-20
- Supercuda, Comm*Data, C64
- Trashman, Creative, C64
- Traxx, Quicksilva, VIC-20, ZX Spectrum
- Van-Van Car, Karateco, arcade
- Z-Man, DJL, ZX Spectrum
- Zappy Zooks, Romik, C64

1984

- Devil World, Nintendo, NES
- Ghost Gobbler, Orwin Software, ZX Spectrum
- Ms. Maze, Tom Mix, Tandy CoCo
- Munch Mania, Mastertronic, C64
- Pirate Ship Higemaru, Capcom, arcade
- Spatter, Sega, arcade
- Spriteman 64, Interceptor, C64
- Squirm, Mastertronic, C64
- Z-Man, ZX Spectrum, DJL Software
- Zulu, Silverbird, C64

1985

- Chrysalis, Icon, BBC Micro
- Doodle Bug, Mastertronic, VIC-20
- Floppy-Eater!, Floppy Magazine 64, C64
- Fruit Pickin', P.F. Software, Atari 8-bit
- I'm Sorry, Sega, arcade
- Oh Shit!, Aackosoft, MSX
- Taxicab Hill, Antic Software, Atari 8-bit

1987

- 3D Dotty, Blue Ribbon, BBC Micro
- Classic Muncher, Bubble Bus, Amstrad CPC
- Cruncher Factory, Kingsoft, Amiga
- Fantasy Zone: The Maze, Sega, arcade
- Gobbler's Revenge, Commodore Magazine, C64
- Mango, Blue Ribbon, BBC Micro
- Pac-Mania, Namco, arcade

1988

- Knicker-Bockers, StarSoft, Atari 8-bit
- Mad Mix, Topo Soft, Amstrad CPC, ZX Spectrum, Atari ST, others
- Snowplow, ANALOG Computing, Atari 8-bit
- Yuu Maze, Taito, Famicom Disk System

1989

- Fast Food, Codemasters, C64, ZX Spectrum, others
- Maze Mania, Hewson, ZX Spectrum, C64, Amstrad CPC
- Maze of Flott, Taito, arcade

1990

- Hacman II, freeware, Atari ST
- Kwik Snax, Codemasters, ZX Spectrum, C64, others
- Marty's Nightmare, CoCoPro, Tandy CoCo 3
- Trog, Midway, arcade

1991

- Jungle Jim, Energize, Amiga, Atari ST

1992

- GobMan, Shareware, MS-DOS

1993

- CD-Man, Creative Dimensions, MS-DOS
- Mean Arenas, Nite Time, Amiga
- Tinkle Pit, Namco, arcade

1995

- Go! Go! Mile Smile, Funki, arcade

1996

- Bubble Trouble, Ambrosia, Mac
- Pac-Man Arrangement, Namco, arcade

1997

- Freddi Fish and Luther's Maze Madness, Humongous Entertainment

1998

- 3D Maze Man, eGames, Windows

2000

- Ms. Pac-Man Maze Madness, Namco, PlayStation

2006

- Pac the Man X, McSebi, OS X

2007

- Pac-Man Championship Edition, Namco Bandai, Xbox 360, PS3, PSP, Windows, iOS, Android

2010

- Pac-Man Championship Edition DX, Namco Bandai, Xbox 360, PS3, Windows, iOS, Android

2016

- Pac-Man Championship Edition 2, Bandai Namco, Xbox One, PS4, Windows, Switch

== Grid capture games ==
In grid capture games, also called line coloring games, the maze consists of lines forming a lattice of rectangles, and the goal is to fill-in rectangles by traversing their perimeters. The model for the sub-genre was established by Konami's Amidar in 1981.

1981
- Amidar, Konami/Stern, arcade

1982

- Blade Runner, Wizardsoft, C64
- Demolition Herby, Telesys, Atari 2600
- Jeepers Creepers, Quality, Atari 8-bit
- Jolly Jogger, Taito, arcade
- Kid Grid, Tronix, Atari 8-bit
- Macho Mouse, Techstar, arcade
- Radar Zone / Out Line, Century, arcade
- Pepper II, Exidy, arcade
- Time Runner, Funsoft, TRS-80
- Triple Punch, KKI, arcade

1983

- Colour Clash, Romnik, ZX Spectrum
- Cuthbert Goes Walkabout, Microdeal, Dragon, CoCo, C64, Atari 8-bit
- Gridder, Microdigital, VIC-20
- Potty Painter in the Jungle, Rabbit, C64
- Rollin, Atlantis, C64
- Spiderdroid, Froggo, Atari 2600
- Super Gridder, Terminal, C64

1984

- Crazy Tracer, Acornsoft, Acorn Electron, BBC Micro
- Hooper, Calisto, C64
- Oh Mummy, Gem, Amstrad CPC, ZX Spectrum
- Pesky Painter, Supersoft, C64
- Rollo and the Brush Bros., Windmill, MS-DOS

1986

- Gapper, freeware, MS-DOS
- Panel Panic, Aackosoft, MSX

1993

- 2nd Space, Sachen, Mega Duck, Game Boy

1994

- Painter, Sinister, Atari ST

1999

- Live Wire!, SCI, PlayStation
