= List of Pac-Man clones =

In video gaming, Pac-Man clones are unauthorized versions of Namco's popular maze chase arcade video game Pac-Man or games that wholesale borrow the design of Pac-Man. The combined sales of counterfeit arcade machines sold nearly as many units as the original Pac-Man, which had sold more than 300,000 machines.

Like the original game, Pac-Man clones typically have the goal of clearing a maze of dots while eluding deadly adversaries. When special items are eaten, the protagonist consume the pursuers for a brief period. Clones may vary the audio/visual theme, use different maze layouts, slightly tweak features, or even invert elements such as filling the maze rather than emptying it, but they have the same general feel of Pac-Man.

The Giant List of Classic Game Programmers lists 60 Pac-Man clones released for various platforms. MobyGames lists 355 Pac-Man variants.

== Arcade clones ==
- Lock 'n' Chase (1981) was developed and published by Data East in Japan and later in North America by Taito. Here, Pac-Man is replaced with a thief stealing coins from a bank vault. The ghosts are police, and the thief can temporarily block passages with doors. It was licensed to Mattel, which released Intellivision and Atari 2600 versions in 1982.
- Mighty Mouth (1981) is a game by A-1 Machines that District Court Judge Warren Keith Urbom described as "for all practical purposes, identical to...Pac-Man" Among the similarities cited were the color and shape of the player character and ghosts, the maze configurations, the sound effects, the paths of the characters in the attract mode and the paths of the characters in both the attract mode and a game where the player does not move. Midway, owners of the Pac-Man copyrights, were granted summary judgment for copyright and trademark infringement in 1983.
- Piranha (1981) was released by GL. The central character is a dot-chomping piranha, and squid creatures replace the ghost monsters.
- The Hand (1981) was released by TIC. The central character is a dot-chomping hand, and the ghost monsters are replaced by hands representing Rock (a fist), Paper (splayed fingers), and Scissors (two fingers outstretched).
- Thief (1981) was released by Pacific Novelty. The central character is the titular Thief in a getaway vehicle, while police officers in cars replace the ghost monsters. Thief uses scripted radio communications between the officers, played from a cassette tape inside the arcade cabinet.

== Contemporary home system clones ==
- A-maz-ing (1981)
- CatChum (1981) developed by Yahoo Software for Kaypro's luggable computers. It is a text-based game, using characters for the graphics.
- Ghost Hunter (1981) from Arcade Plus for the Atari 8-bit computers
- Gobble Man (1981) for the TRS-80.
- Gobbler (1981) by Sierra On-Line for the Apple II family.
- Jawbreaker (1981) by Sierra On-Line for the Atari 8-bit computers. Atari, Inc. threatened to sue the publishers, Sierra On-Line, but they released the game anyway. Atari won the ensuing lawsuit.
- Jelly Monsters (1981) for the VIC-20 is a port of Namco's Pac-Man by HAL Laboratory who had the home computer rights to Namco's games in Japan at the time. When the games were released in North America, the names were changed to avoid legal issues with Atari, Inc. who had the home computer rights in North America. Jelly Monsters for the VIC-20 was published by Commodore International. Atari ended up suing HAL and Commodore anyway and won the lawsuit, after which Atari pulled off HAL's VIC-20 port and released their own version.
- K.C. Munchkin! (1981) for the Odyssey². In the 1982 case Atari, Inc. v. North American Philips Consumer Electronics Corp., an Appellate court found that Phillips had copied Pac-Man and made alterations that "only tend to emphasize the extent to which it deliberately copied the Plaintiff's work." The ruling was one of the first to establish how copyright law would apply to the look and feel of computer software.
- Pac-Tac (1981) for the TRS-80 CoCo.
- Puckman (1981) for the Apple II.
- Scarfman (1981) for the TRS-80
- Snakman (1981) for the VIC-20 and Commodore 64.
- Snoggle (1981)
- Super Puckman (1981) for Apple II by ADO Software.
- Super Taxman 2 (1981) for the Apple II.
- Taxman (1981) for the Apple II was programmed by Brian Fitzgerald. Atari sued Fitzgerald and he sold the port to Atari, which the company ended up selling as a licensed version of the game.
- Atom Man (1982)
- Cat Trax (1982)
- Ghost Hunt (1982)
- Gobble a Ghost (1982) by CDS Micro Systems for the ZX Spectrum
- Hungry Boy (1982) for the Apple II.
- Jawbreaker II (1982) for Atari.
- Mazeman (1982)
- Mr. Munch (1982) for the TRS-80 CoCo.
- Munch Man (1982) is a clone from Texas Instruments for the TI-99/4A home computer. Instead of clearing a maze, the player fills it with "links" (in Munch Man parlance)—a change made by TI to avoid possible lawsuits.
- Munchyman (1982) for the BBC Micro.
- Pac Mania (1982) for the TRS-80 (unrelated to the officially released game of the same name).
- Snack Attack (1982) is a clone for the Apple II written by Dan Illowsky and published by Datamost. It became a top selling game for the Apple II.
- Snak Pac (1982) for TRS-80 CoCo by Tom Mix Software.
- Snapper (1982). The initial release for the BBC Micro and Acorn Electron, by Acornsoft, was so close to Pac-Man (including the design of the game's characters) that this version had to be withdrawn and re-released with the characters changed. The player's character became a round yellow face with very short legs wearing a green cowboy hat and the ghosts became skinny humanoid monsters.
- Spookyman (1982) for ZX Spectrum by Abbex Electronics.
- The Gobbling Box (1982) for the TRS-80.
- The Queen of Hearts Maze Game (1982)
- Trashman (1982)
- Zac-Man (1982)
- 3-Demon (1983) is a wireframe-3D Pac-Man clone.
- Arcade Action (1983)
- Byter (1983)
- Chomps (1983) for IBM-PC by Howard Eugene Arrington of Ensign Software, published by Softsmith of The Software Guild was entirely in text mode using the IBM-PC's code page 437. The player character, the enemy ghosts, the pellets and bonus items were represented by one single characters each, respectively ☻, Ω, • and ♫. Box-drawing characters were used to construct four mazes.
- Damper/Glooper (1983)
- Doctor Who: The First Adventure (1983)
- Dot Gobbler (1983) for the Commodore 64.
- Dot Man (1983) for the VIC-20.
- Galaxians & Gloops (1983)
- 1983 Gobbledegook (1983)
- Jaws (1983)
- Monster Muncher (1983)
- Nibbler (1983) for the Apple II.
- Pac Rabbit (1983)
- Pac-Panic (1983) for the TRS-80 CoCo.
- Packman (1983) for MS-DOS
- Pacmania (1983); also unrelated to the official Pac-Mania game
- Pactron (1983) for Commodore 64 by Aardvark Technical Services.
- Racer Ball (1983)
- Zappy Zooks (1983)
- Clam Bake (1984) for the Apple II.
- Devil World (1984) for the Famicom was designed by Shigeru Miyamoto.
- Ghostman (1984) for Oric by Infogrames.
- Miss Gobbler (1984) for the TRS-80 CoCo.
- Oh Shit! (1984) for the MSX.
- Spriteman 64 (1984)
- Vacuumania (1984) for the MSX platform
- Mrs Pac (1986) for the TRS-80 CoCo.
- Tommy's Packrat (1986) for DOS.
- Classic Muncher (1987)
- Pac-Maine (1988)
- CD-MAN (1989) for DOS by Creative Dimensions.
- MaxMan (1989) for DOS by Christopher G. Gunn.
- Pacman (1989) for the Amiga.
- Chomp (1990) for Windows.
- Pac-Dude (1990) for the TRS-80 CoCo.
- TITANman (1990) for the PC.
- Cruncher (1991) for the PC by Karsten Finger.
- Pacman ST (1991) for Atari ST by Robert Leong, published by Budgie UK.
- Ms. Chomp (1992) for Windows.
- Crapman - A Game for Real Heroes (1993)
- H Mec 2 (1993)
- Pacman on E's (1993) for 6800.
- Multi Pakman (1994) for Atari ST by Stosser Software.
- Pako (1994) for DOS by Uranium Software.
- Pac 2000 (1996)
- Curious George Learns Phonics (1997)
- Pac-Man: A Tribute to the Great Game (1997) for TRS-80 CoCo by Nickolas Marentes.
- Twinkle (1997)
- Suzy Sushi (2000)
- Aztec Maze (2001)
- Cool Cruncher (2002) is a 3D Pac-Man clone.
- Cruncher in Mazeland (2002)
- Mr. Donutman (2003)
- Froggies (2006)
- Lady Cruncher (2006)
- Eicheljagd (2007)
- Pack's Land (2008)
- Cacman (2017)
- Koin o atsumete! Yuniti-chan (2019)
- Zimmy's Ghosts (2025)

== Mini and mainframe clones ==
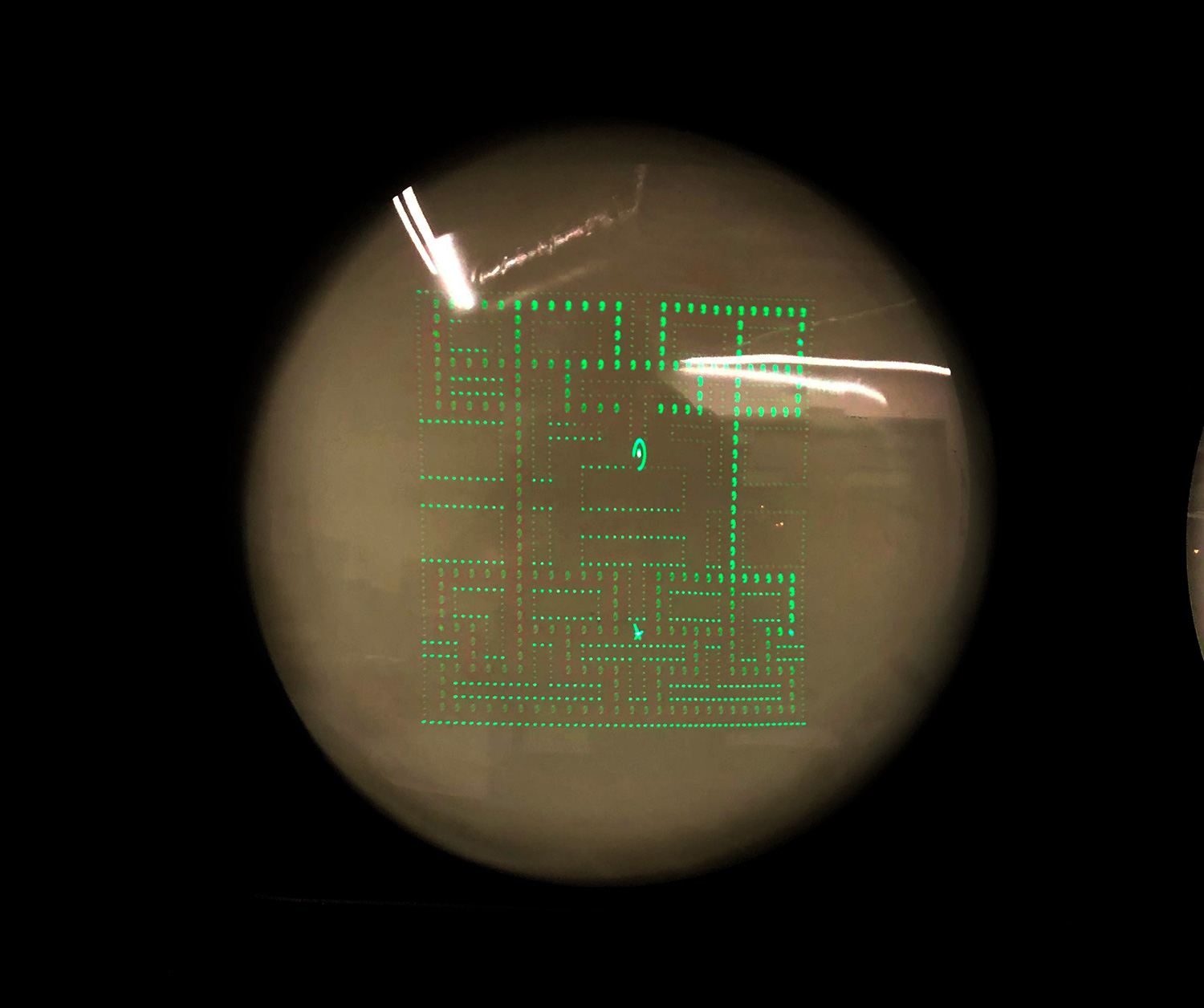
PAC running on a CDC 6600

- Pac-Man is a clone for the Xerox Alto, the first computer with a mouse-driven graphical user interface. The main character is controlled with a mouse.
- PAC is a clone for the CDC 6000 series of mainframe computers.

== See also ==
- List of maze chase games
