= Jeepers Creepers (video game) =

1982 video game

- Developer: Quality Software
- Publisher: Quality Software
- Designer: James Albanese
- Platform: Atari 8-bit
- Release: 1982
- Genre: Maze
- Mode: Single-player

Jeepers Creepers is a grid capture video game written by James Albanese for Atari 8-bit computers. It was published by Quality Software in 1982. Similar in concept to Konami's Amidar, the player controls a "bug" which moves around a grid, changing the color of the lines, while avoiding wasps. When all of the lines surrounding a rectangle have been colored, the rectangle is filled in. Some rectangles give special rewards when filled. The goal is to fill all the rectangles.

== Gameplay ==
The player steers a bug around an irregular grid of different sized rectangles, coloring the orange lines yellow as it moves. A rectangle is captured by coloring all the lines around it. The level ends when all of the lines have been colored (and thus all of the rectangles filled). There are four mazes: Number One, Scrambler, Brick Wall, and Skull Run.

Some rectangles contain special items which are acquired by capturing the rectangle:

1. A "jump" lets the player press the joystick button to move to a random position in the maze, like hyperspace in Asteroids. (Note: This is different from how jumps work in the similar game, Amidar.)
2. A beetle immediately pursues a wasp. When caught, both the wasp and the beetle itself are removed from the board.
3. One to three unmarked rectangles in a level contain a Super Beetle, which is faster than a normal beetle and can eat multiple wasps.

The game can be played in normal and "coast" modes. When coast is enabled, the bug keeps moving in the current direction, even when the joystick is released, until hitting the end of a path. In normal mode, the bug stops as soon as the joystick is no longer moved.

== Development ==
Jeepers Creepers was written by James Albanese in QS Forth, a version of the Forth programming language also written by Albanese and sold by Quality Software.

== Reception ==
Consumer Guide's The Best Atari Software wrote, "The action in Jeepers Creepers is superb, and the sound effects and graphics make it a good game for any age group, even young children". Book of Atari Software 1983 gave an overall rating of B, with a B+ grades for "game depth" and "holds interest": "This chase game is extremely fun and intriguing to play. It is a simple game offering a lot of choices and good depth."

Both the Twin City Atari Interest Group newsletter and ANALOG Computing compared Jeepers Creepers to Kid Grid, also released in 1982.

== See also ==
- Pepper II
- Time Runner
- Triple Punch
