= List of ZX81 games =

This is a sortable list of games for the ZX81 and Lambda 8300 home computers. There are currently 322 games in this incomplete list.

== Games ==
Name	Year	Publisher
10 Games	1981	J.K. Greye Software Ltd
1K Games Pack	1981	Artic Computing Ltd
2K Games Pack	1982	International Publishing & Software Inc
3D 3D!	1981	DK'Tronics Ltd
3D Defender	1981	J.K. Greye Software Ltd
3D Formule 1	1984	ERE Informatique
3D Grand Prix	1983	DK'Tronics Ltd
3D Monster Maze	1982	J.K. Greye Software Ltd
3D O's and X's	1981	Macronics Systems Ltd
3K Space Invaders	1981	Macronics Systems Ltd
5 pour jouer	1984	Direco International
5 pour reflechir	1984	Direco International
Advanced Budget Manager	1982	Softsync Inc
Adventure	1982	Bug-Byte Software Ltd
Adventure A	1981	Artic Computing Ltd
Adventure B: Inca Treasure	1981	Artic Computing Ltd
Adventure C: Alien Spaceship	1982	Artic Computing Ltd
Adventure in Time	1983	Work Force
Adventure One	1982	Abersoft
Adventure Quest	1982	Level 9 Computing Ltd
Adventure Tape		Phipps Associates
Air Traffic Controll	1984	Hama Systems
Airline	1982	CCS
Alien Attack	1981	Bug-Byte Software Ltd
Alien-Dropout	1982	Silversoft Ltd
Androids	1982	Computer Rentals Ltd
Argolath	1984	Loriciels
Around Europe in Eighty Hours	1982	International Publishing & Software Inc
Asteroids	1982	DK'Tronics Ltd
Astral Convoy	1982	Vortex Software
Autochef	1982	CCS
Baby Maths	1984	Sprites
Bank Robber	1983	Romik Software
Banquise	1984	Soft et Micro
Bar Billiards	1983	Meow Micros
Baron		Temptation Software Ltd
Bat Cage	1982	Timex Computer Corporation
Battle of Britain	1981	Microgame Simulations
Battleships	1983	Meow Micros
Big Race	1983	Peter Gjørup (Denmark)
Bigflap Attack	1982	Timex Computer Corporation
Black Star	1983	Quicksilva Ltd
Bomber	1982	Fisher-Marriott Software
Booster	1985	Software Farm
Bouncing Bert	1985	Software Farm
Bowling	1982	LOG
Breakout 3		Axis Software
Breakout (CDS Microsystems)	1982	CDS Microsystems
Breakout (J.K. Greye Software Ltd)	1981	J.K. Greye Software Ltd
Breakout, Space Invaders and Music	1981	Macronics Systems Ltd
Brick-Stop	1982	CDS Microsystems
Bubble Bugs	1983	Romik Software
Bumper		Axis Software
Calpac Patterns	1982	Calpac Computer Software
Camelot	1983	CCS
Casse-Briques	1983	ERE Informatique
Cassette 50	1982	Cascade
Castle Adventure	1982	CDS Microsystems
Castle Colditz	1983	Felix Software
Catacombs	1981	J.K. Greye Software Ltd
Cavernas de Marte	1985	Ciberne Software (Brazil)
Centipede	1982	Llamasoft
Chevalier Arthur	1985	Loriciels
City Patrol	1982	Macronics Systems Ltd
Clever Clogs Whizz Quiz for age 7+	1983	Computertutor
Club Record Controller	1982	Sinclair Research Ltd
Cobra	1984	Loriciels
Collector's	1982	Sinclair Research Ltd
Colossal Adventure	1982	Level 9 Computing Ltd
Columbia	1984	Sprites
Concentration	1982	International Publishing & Software Inc
Condition Red	1982	Work Force
Contos de Grimm	1983	TMX Portugal Ltda
Croaka-Crawla	1983	Quicksilva Ltd
Crocky	1984	Loriciels
Crystal 5	1985	A.G.B.
Dallas	1982	CCS
Damper	1983	Quicksilva Ltd
Daytona	1984	No Man's Land
Defenda	1982	Quicksilva Ltd
Deflexx	1981	DK'Tronics Ltd
Deflexx II	1981	DK'Tronics Ltd
Demolition	1982	Phipps Associates
Dictator	1982	Bug-Byte Software Ltd
Dodgems and Connect 4	1982	CDS Microsystems
Dominó	1985	BRS
Dominoes	1983	Phipps Associates
Double Breakout	1981	Beam Software
Dragon Maze	1981	Macronics Systems Ltd
Drive		Scan Bit Software (Denmark)
Dungeons of Doom	1982	Temptation Software Ltd
Encounter	1982	Quicksilva Ltd
Escape From Manhattan	1983	CRL Group PLC
Escape from Shazzar	1983	International Publishing & Software Inc
Farmer	1983	CCS
Fighter Pilot	1982	Digital Integration
Flipper	1983	TMX Portugal Ltda
Football	1982	Tyrant
Football Manager	1981	Addictive Games Ltd
Fortaleza de Zorlac	1983	TMX Portugal Ltda
Forth	1983	Sinclair Research Ltd
Fortress of Zorlac	1982	Timex Computer Corporation
Forty Niner	1982	Software Farm
Free Cassette	1983	Direco International
Frogger	1981	Sega
Froggy	1982	DJL Software Ltd
Fun Fair Adventure	1983	Fawkes Computing
Galactic Gunner	1983	Timex Computer Corporation
Galactic Patrol	1983	CRL Group PLC
Galactic Trooper	1983	Romik Software
Galaxians	1983	Quicksilva Ltd
Galaxy Invaders (Bridge Software)	1981	Bridge Software
Galaxy Invaders (International Publishing & Software Inc)	1982	International Publishing & Software Inc
Galaxy Jailbreak	1983	Romik Software
Galaxy Warrior	1981	Artic Computing Ltd
Game Pac	1982	Tyrant
Game Pack	1982	JRS Software Ltd
Games 1	1981	Sinclair Research Ltd
Games 4	1981	Sinclair Research Ltd
Games II	1982	JRS Software Ltd
Games Tape 2	1981	J.K. Greye Software Ltd
Gamestape 1	1983	Fawkes Computing
Gamestape #3	1984	ICT Software
Glooper	1983	Quicksilva Ltd
Gobbleman	1982	Artic Computing Ltd
Gold	1981	Hilderbay Ltd
Golf (Meow Micros)	1983	Meow Micros
Golf (R&R Software Ltd)	1982	R&R Software Ltd
Great Britain Ltd	1982	Hessel Software
Greedy Gulch	1982	Phipps Associates
Guffy		Programeksperten (Denmark)
Gulp	1982	Campbell Systems
Gulp 2	1982	Campbell Systems
Gulpman	1982	Micromega
Hangman	1982	Softsync Inc
Hole in one	1983	Novus Software
Home Money Manager	1982	International Publishing & Software Inc
HR Invaders	1983	Odyssey Computing
In the Best Possible Taste!	1983	Automata UK Ltd
Inheritance	1982	Hessel Software
Invader		Scan Bit Software (Denmark)
Invaders	1981	Bug-Byte Software Ltd
Invasion Force	1982	Artic Computing Ltd
Jogos de Casino I	1983	TMX Portugal Ltda
Kampvogn		Peter Gjørup (Denmark)
Kasino Kraps	1983	Timex Computer Corporation
Keys To Gondrun	1982	International Publishing & Software Inc
Kingdom of Nam	1981	Microgame Simulations
Kludo	1983	Meow Micros
Krakit	1982	International Publishing & Software Inc
Krazy Kong	1982	PSS
Krypton Ordeal		Novus Software
Labirinto Tridimensional	1982	Microsoft Ltda (Brazil)
Lap Record	1981	Macronics Systems Ltd
Le Chateau Hante	1984	Sprites
Le Pendu	1984	ERE Informatique
Learning Lab	1981	Sinclair Research Ltd
Lost Island	1982	JRS Software Ltd
Love	1982	Remsoft
Love and Death	1982	Automata UK Ltd
Lunar Rescue	1982	Mikro-Gen Ltd
Magic Mountain	1982	Phipps Associates
Marine Rescue	1982	International Publishing & Software Inc
Master of the Rings	1983	Meow Micros
Mazeman	1982	Abersoft
Mazogs	1981	Bug-Byte Software Ltd
Merchant of Venus	1982	Crystal Computing
Meteor Storm	1982	DK'Tronics Ltd
Micro Mouse Goes Debugging	1983	MC Lothlorien Ltd
Midway Campaign	1983	Avalon Hill Game Company
Mind vs. Machine	1982	2-Bit Software
Minefield	1981	R&R Software Ltd
Mission of the Deep	1981	Macronics Systems Ltd
Missione Impossibile	1985	J. Soft
Mixed Game Bag 1	1982	Timex Computer Corporation
Mixed Game Bag 2	1982	Timex Computer Corporation
Mixed Game Bag III	1982	Timex Computer Corporation
Monkey Kong		Scan Bit Software (Denmark)
Monster Mine	1982	Richard Shepherd Software Ltd
Moyenne	1982	ETSF
Muncher	1982	Silversoft Ltd
Muren	1984	Peter Gjørup (Denmark)
Murgatroyds	1982	Collins Computing
Murgatroyds Revenge	1982	Collins Computing
Namtir Raiders	1982	Artic Computing Ltd
Night Gunner	1982	Digital Integration
Nightmare Park	1981	Macronics Systems Ltd
Oregon Trail	1982	Quicksilva Ltd
Ormen		Scan Bit Software (Denmark)
Othello Reversi	1982	Direco International
Pac Rabbit	1983	International Publishing & Software Inc
Party Game	1982	Tyrant
Patrouille De L'Espace	1981	Sinclair Research Ltd
Pengy	1984	Fawkes Computing
Perilous Swamp	1981	Psion Computers
Phoenix Adventure	1982	CDS Microsystems
Pilot	1981	Hewson Consultants
Pimania	1982	Automata UK Ltd
Pinball	1982	Timex Computer Corporation
Planet Defender		Scan Bit Software (Denmark)
Planet Raider	1983	Novus Software
Planeta da Morte	1983	TMX Portugal Ltda
Planetoids	1981	Macronics Systems Ltd
Polaris	1984	Ciberne Software (Brazil)
Pooter Puzzler No.1	1985	Pooter Games
Power 1	1982	Timex Computer Corporation
Print Shop	1983	CCS
Privateer	1982	MC Lothlorien Ltd
Protector	1982	Abacus Programs
Puckman	1981	Hewson Consultants
Puzzle	1982	LOG
Pyramid	1981	J.K. Greye Software Ltd
Q'Bert	1985	Ciberne Software (Brazil)
QS-Asteroids	1982	Quicksilva Ltd
QS Defenda	1981	Quicksilva Ltd
RALLY	1983	Microsoft Ltda (Brazil)
Red Alert	1981	Softsync Inc
Reversi (Artic Computing Ltd)	1982	Artic Computing Ltd
Reversi (Mine of Information Ltd)	1982	Mine of Information Ltd
Reversi (Sinclair Research Ltd)	1982	Sinclair Research Ltd
Rigel	1984	ERE Informatique
Road Race	1983	Meow Micros
Robbers of the Lost Tomb	1982	Timeworks
Rocket Man	1984	Software Farm
Roman Empire	1982	MC Lothlorien Ltd
Rubik Cube	1982	CDS Microsystems
Ruine	1984	Loriciels
S. O. S.		Peter Gjørup (Denmark)
Sabotage	1982	Macronics Systems Ltd
Sabotagem	1983	TMX Portugal Ltda
Samurai Warrior	1982	MC Lothlorien Ltd
Scorpirus	1984	ERE Informatique
Sea War	1982	Panda Software
Serpent's Tomb	1983	Vortex Software
Simulador de Voo	1983	TMX Portugal Ltda
Slot-Machine	1984	Finsbury Software
Soccer	1983	Meow Micros
Space-Hunt		Scan Bit Software (Denmark)
Space Intruders	1981	Hewson Consultants
Space Invaders	1981	DK'Tronics Ltd
Space Invaders / Space Rescue	1981	Macronics Systems Ltd
Space Man Apollo	1984	ICT Software
Space Mission	1982	Gem Software
Space Shuttle	1983	Accord Data International Ltd
Squeeze Play		Scan Bit Software (Denmark)
Star Defence	1983	JRS Software Ltd
Star Trek (Bug-Byte Software Ltd)	1981	Bug-Byte Software Ltd
Star Trek (Macronics Systems Ltd)	1981	Macronics Systems Ltd
Star Trek (PSS)	1982	PSS
Star Trek (Silversoft Ltd)	1981	Silversoft Ltd
Starbuster	1983	Meow Micros
Starfighter	1981	J.K. Greye Software Ltd
Starquest	1982	Pixel Productions
Starquest and Encounter	1982	Quicksilva Ltd
Stock Market Game	1982	Timex Computer Corporation
Stormforce	1983	Meow Micros
Strategy Football	1983	Timex Computer Corporation
Subspace Striker	1982	Pixel Productions
Super Chess	1982	CP Software
Super Glooper	1982	Sinclair Research Ltd
Super Invaders	1982	Bridge Software
Super Invasion	1981	Softsync Inc
Super Invasion 1K	1981	Beam Software
Super Invasion 2K	1981	Beam Software
Super Nine	1982	Romik Software
Super Programs 1	1982	ICL
Super Programs 2	1982	ICL
Super Programs 3	1981	ICL
Super Programs 4	1981	ICL
Super Programs 5	1981	ICL
Super Programs 6	1981	ICL
Super Programs 7	1981	ICL
Super Programs 8	1981	ICL
Super Wumpus	1981	Silversoft Ltd
SuperGulp 2	1982	Campbell Systems
Superlabirinto	1983	TMX Portugal Ltda
Tai	1983	PSS
Ten 1K Games	1983	CRL Group PLC
Ten Pin Bowling	1982	Phipps Associates
Tennis	1984	Loriciels
The Computer Coach	1983	Timex Computer Corporation
The Cube	1982	Timex Computer Corporation
The Gambler	1982	Timex Computer Corporation
The Gauntlet	1982	PSS
The Invaders	1982	Abersoft
The Knight's Quest	1982	Phipps Associates
The Nowotnik Puzzle	1982	Phipps Associates
The Oracle's Cave	1981	Doric Computer Services
The Pharaoh's Tomb	1982	Phipps Associates
The Puzzler	1982	Timex Computer Corporation
Thro' The Wall	1982	Sinclair Research Ltd
Thro' The WallArcade	1982	Sinclair Research Ltd
TKADREZ I	1982	Microsoft Ltda (Brazil)
TKADREZ II	1982	Microsoft Ltda (Brazil)
Torpedo		Scan Bit Software (Denmark)
Tower of Brahma		Scan Bit Software (Denmark)
Trader Jack	1982	Work Force
Treasure Island	1983	Bamby Software
UFO	1983	Protek Computing Ltd
US Presidents Quiz part 1	1982	Timex Computer Corporation
Valkirie	1985	Ciberne Software (Brazil)
Very Nasty Mountain	1982	Giltrole Ltd
Volcanic Dungeon	1982	Carnell Software Ltd
VU-FILE also EXAMPLE	1982	Sinclair Research Ltd
Walk The Plank		Novus Software
War of the Worlds	1983	Meow Micros
War Web	1986	Pooter Games
Warlord	1982	MC Lothlorien Ltd
X-Men	1982	Amba Software
Xadrez	1983	TMX Portugal Ltda
Z-Xtricator	1984	Software Farm
Zac-Man	1981	Macronics Systems Ltd
Zombies	1981	Artic Computing Ltd
ZOR - Battle of the Robots	1982	Pixel Productions
Zuc	1981	Rebit Computer
ZX Action	1982	Axis Software
ZX Bug	1982	International Publishing & Software Inc
ZX Chess II	1981	Artic Computing Ltd
ZX Compendium	1983	Carnell Software Ltd
ZX Galaxia	1982	International Publishing & Software Inc
ZX Galaxians	1982	Artic Computing Ltd
ZX Othello	1982	Mine of Information Ltd
