= Slot Racers =

1978 video game

- Box art by John Enright
- Developer: Atari, Inc.
- Publishers: Atari, Inc.
- Designer: Warren Robinett
- Platform: Atari 2600
- Release: October 1978
- Genre: Maze
- Mode: Multiplayer

Slot Racers (Note: Known as Maze for the Sears release of the Atari VCS) is a maze game developed and published by Atari, Inc. for the Atari Video Computer System (Atari VCS). (Note: The Atari VCS became known as the Atari 2600 only after the release of the Atari 5200 in 1982.) The game involves the players controlling cars equipped with missiles with the goal of firing their missiles at their opponents for points. Each player earns one point for each time they hit their opponent. The first player to earn 25 points wins.

Slot Racers was designed by Warren Robinett and was the first game he designed for Atari. The game was developed under the name Traffic and was influenced by Atari's earlier game Combat (1977). He initially wanted to include roving police cars in the maze but was unable to add this to the game at the time. It was released in October 1978. A review in Video of the game in 1981 declared it "the most important of the classic labyrinth games". Howard J. Blumenthal of The Complete Guide to Electronic Games (1981) found its gameplay inferior to tank-themed games of the era.

Writing for AllGame, Brett Weiss echoed Blumenthal's comments saying that Slot Racers was the inferior game and critiqued its lack of a single-player mode and simplistic graphics. Kevin Bunch found it to be a decent, if not classic, early Atari game, noting that it was an ambitious game from a first-time developer that expanded on the gameplay of earlier maze games such as The Amazing Maze Game (1976). Robinett felt the game was merely okay and on its completion began developing his next game, which would become Adventure (1980).

== Gameplay ==
Gameplay in Slot Racers with a missile being fired from the player two's vehicle. The score is presented at the top with corresponding colors for the vehicle and points.

Slot Racers is a two-player maze game. Unlike other early games for the Atari 2600, like Indy 500 (1977) or Blackjack (1977), where the title of the game implied the theme of the game, Slot Racers is not about slot car racing. The game's setting has each player controlling a "Super Chasemobile", a car that is equipped with powerful technology. Each player steers their vehicle through a maze where they fire missiles at each other from the front of their car. The goal is to chase the opponent and attempt to hit them witha missile. Each hit on an enemy's car gives the player one point. The first player to get 25 points first wins.

There are nine variations of games that adjust the layout of the maze, the speed of the cars, and how the missiles move around the maze. Depending on the difficulty modes set, the player can either fire consecutive missiles where one missile will vanish if another is fired, or another mode where only one missile can be fired at a time; missiles must either hit the opponent's car or otherwise be re-collected by driving over it.

== Development ==
Slot Racers was the first game developed by Warren Robinett, who joined Atari, Inc. in November 1977. At this time at Atari, each game was made by one person who wrote the code, tested, and debugged the games. He developed a game he initially called Traffic which he envisioned as a game where two cars would drive around a city maze firing rockets at each other.

Robinett looked to the video game Combat (1977) for inspiration. He liked the idea of a player having to orient themselves to the direction of a vehicle but did not enjoy how a tank moved when too close to a wall and wanted to ensure that the cars could move around corners smoothly. He then continued working on the game developing different maze layouts and adjusting the speed and momentum of the vehicles. He was unable to include one feature he wanted in the game, which would include police cars with blinking lights that would cruise around the maze to chase players. Robinbett said he turned in the final code for the game in April 1978 after five months of development.

== Release ==
Atari announced the game shortly before the June 1978 Consumer Electronics Show trade show under the title The Maze. Slot Racers was released for the Atari VCS in October 1978. Robinett commented that "the only reason that it got published is that Atari published everything we created in 1978; they needed product." The Telegrams-branded version of the game was released as Maze. The game would later be re-released in 1982, where it was bundled with Indy 500 (1977).

Slot Racers was re-released in various video game compilation formats, such as the Atari 80 in One for Windows in 2003, Atari Anthology for PlayStation 2 and Xbox in 2004, Atari Greatest Hits: Volume 1 for the Nintendo DS in 2011, and dedicated consoles such as the Atari Flashback 4 in 2012.

== Reception ==
Reception

Review scores
Publication	Score
AllGame	1.5/5
The Complete Guide to Electronic Games	2/5
Electronic Games 1983 Software Encyclopedia	7/10

In 1981, Bill Kunkel and Arnie Katz (under the name Franke Laney, Jr.) reviewed Slot Racers, Take the Money and Run! (1978), and Maze Craze (1980) in their article in Video magazine on the rise of maze games. They described the game as requiring quick thinking and fast reactions and concluded that it is "the most important of the classic labyrinth games". The writers would re-iterate similar comments in Electronic Games magazine's 1983 Software Encyclopedia. Howard J. Blumenthal wrote in his book The Complete Guide to Electronic Games (1981) that the game is an odd combination of a tank-themed game with race cars and suggested audiences play the tank-themed games which had more variety and action instead. In brief reviews from the early 1980s, Sonya Bradford of the British magazine TV Gamer wrote that poor graphics diminished the overall quality of the game. Annene Kaye and Simon Fellowes of Vidiot magazine briefly commented on Slot Racers, with Fellowes summarizing it being "really, really boring."

Writing for AllGame, Brett Weiss echoed Blumenthal's comments saying that Slot Racers was "little more than a maze variation on the Combat theme, and a not very good one". He also found the game lacking in terms of variety compared to what Combat offered and that it had poor controls and graphics "so simplistic it's almost an embarrassment". In his book Atari Archive: Vol.1 1977-1978, Kevin Bunch said that Slot Racers was a remarkable feat for a first-time developer and while it was not a classic, it was better when set to the more complicated mazes and faster speeds. He complimented the game for expanding on the maze-exploration gameplay that was established by earlier titles like The Amazing Maze Game (1976).

Robinett later described the development of the game as being "a learning exercise" and that Slot Racers was a "pretty average game. It was not great; I think it was not terrible, either." Around the time Robinett completed Slot Racers, he visited a Stanford AI lab and played the text adventure game Colossal Cave Adventure. This led him to develop his next game for Atari, which would become Adventure (1980).

== See also ==
- List of Atari 2600 games
- List of maze video games
