= 3D Tunnel =

1983 video game

- Developer: Malcolm Evans
- Publisher: New Generation Software
- Platform: ZX Spectrum
- Release: EU: 1983
- Genre: Shoot 'em up

3D Tunnel is a shoot 'em up video game written by Malcolm Evans for the ZX Spectrum It was published by New Generation Software in 1983.

The cassette inlay describes it as, "Another fast moving 3D game from the author of 3D Monster Maze and Defender for the ZX81. Flapping Birds, Scurrying Rats, Leaping Toads, Crawling Spiders all appear live in the 3D Tunnel".

== Gameplay ==
The player travels through a tunnel where creatures such as bats, toads, rats, and spiders move toward the player with distinct animated behaviors, and in the 48K version a silver underground train appears at the tunnel's end with visible lights and passengers as it rushes past. The player attempts to line up targets within a depth effect created by concentric squares while firing a single‑line laser, advancing through waves either by defeating enemies or by selecting later sequences from the available game options, which also include multiple joystick choices.

== Reception ==
Computer and Video Games: "Superb graphics and game presentation but not for the non-persistent".

ZX Computing: "The graphics are so good that I could have just sat there and watched the demo for an hour. This is very professionally put together and a game that I would recommend to anyone".
