= Monster Munch (disambiguation) =

Monster Munch is a baked crisp snack made by Walkers, and formerly by Smiths.

Monster Munch may also refer to

- Mighty Munch, a corn snack made by Tayto, formerly known as "Monster Munch"
- Monster Munch (France), a potato snack sold in France by Intersnack under the Vico brand
- Monster Munch (video game), a Pac-Man style video game for the Commodore 64

== See also ==
- Monster Munchies, a British cookery television show
