= Kid Grid =

1982 video game

- Developer: Tronix
- Publisher: Tronix
- Programmer: Arti Haroutunian
- Platforms: Atari 8-bit, Commodore 64
- Release: 1982: Atari; 1983: C64
- Genre: Maze
- Mode: Single-player

Kid Grid is a grid capture video game which borrows heavily from the 1981 arcade video game Amidar. Written by Arti Haroutunian for Atari 8-bit computers, it was published by Tronix in 1982. A Commodore 64 port from the same programmer was released in 1983. In Kid Grid, the player moves along the horizontal and vertical lines of the playfield, turning the lines from dotted gray to solid blue. If all the lines around a square are completed, it is filled-in. Deadly creatures chase the player.

== Gameplay ==
The Kid, just below screen center, trailing a blue line (Atari 8-bit)

The objective is to color all of the lines on the grid by moving over them, capturing the 35 squares. Four pursuers kill the player on contact: Moose, Squashface, Muggy, and Thuggy. They are visually unique, but have the same behavior. Question marks randomly appear in some squares which give bonus points when captured. Pressing the joystick button briefly stuns the enemies so they don't move and can be passed through by the player (analogous to "jumps" in Amidar). A fixed number of stuns are available.

There are five selectable difficulty levels, and the game can be played with 3, 5, or 7 stuns.

== Development ==
Arti Haroutunian wrote Kid Grid in two months using the Atari Assembler Editor cartridge. He programmed the Commodore 64 port himself. Tronix ran magazine adverts promoting both Kid Grid and another game by Haroutunian, Juice!, mentioning him by name.

== Reception ==
The reviewer for Antic called it, "the most exciting mutation of Pac-Man I have ever played." David H. Ahl criticized the simplistic sound effects, but concluded, "All in all, we found Kid Grid to be one of the most playable and addictive games around. It is cute, fast, and fun."

Electronic Games wrote, "The play mechanic alone makes this one of the most compulsive, utterly addictive contests in the world of computer gaming" and "Kid Grid has play value coming out of its ears and enough speed to give even its inspiration, Amidar, a run for its money." Electronic Fun with Computers & Games also compared Kid Grid to Amidar, calling out three differences: "The grid is square, not irregular...there is no bonus round (or bonus points for finishing a grid) and the monsters are more intent on killing you and less intent on having a good time." Creative Computing went so far as to label it a "good home version of an arcade hit".

In a "C−" review, Addison Wesley Book of Atari Software 1984 wrote, "the game's utter simplicity works against it after repeated play. There is only one maze and a simple strategy to keep one step ahead of the pursuing creatures."

== See also ==
- Jeepers Creepers
- Time Runner
- Triple Punch
