= Trashman =

Trashman may refer to the following:

- Trashman (character), a fictional character and eponymous comic book created by Spain Rodriguez
- Trashman (video game), a 1984 video game for the ZX Spectrum
- The Trashmen, a band from Minneapolis, Minnesota
- Waste collector, the occupation
- "Trashman", a song by Kesha from her 2025 album Period
- Trashman, the wrestling alter-ego of Frank Reynolds from It's Always Sunny in Philadelphia, from the episode The Gang Wrestles for the Troops
