= Monkey Kong =

Monkey Kong may refer to:

- Donkey Kong, a series of video games featuring an ape-like character, first released in 1981
- Monkey Kong, a 1983 Donkey Kong clone video game by Med Systems Software
- Monkey Kong (album), US title of the A album 'A' vs. Monkey Kong, or the title track
