= Escape (video game) =

1982 video game

- Developer: Malcolm Evans
- Publisher: New Generation Software
- Platform: ZX Spectrum
- Release: 1982
- Genre: Maze

Escape is maze video game for the ZX Spectrum developed by New Generation Software and published in 1982. The cassette inlay reads:

Can you ESCAPE from the monsters? You must search through the maze to find the axe which will enable you to break down the door and ESCAPE. But it is not that easy—the Triceratops hides behind the hedges and the Pteranodon soars over the maze to swoop down upon you

== Gameplay ==
The player searches a maze for an axe to break the exit and escape. They are chased by a single dinosaur. Each successful escape increases the number of dinosaurs roaming the maze, until level 5, which introduces a pterosaur that occasionally flies over the walls, not being restricted to the maze paths. Upon finding the axe, which is randomly placed for each level, the player slows down allowing the dinosaurs to catch up.

The maze is displayed from an above and slightly angled point of view, giving the impression of depth.

The player (in black) carrying the axe, and being chased by five dinosaurs. The entrance to the maze is in the bottom right, and the exit (still blocked) in the top left.

== Reception ==
Sinclair User: "The game was written by the author of the J K Greye 3D Monster Maze and is one of the best and most original games we have seen for the Spectrum so far"

ZX Computing: "This is not, as it may sound a jump on the 'Pacman' bandwagon, but rather an original and absorbing game which can become extremely difficult and frustrating"

Popular Computing Weekly: "I would rate two of the games here Escape and Dictator as being amongst the best Spectrum games I have played"
