= Gobbler =

Gobbler may refer to:

- Gobbler, another name for a male turkey
- Gobbler, a commercial brand name for a Thanksgiving sandwich sold by several fast food chains
- Gobbler, Arkansas, a community in the United States
- Gobbler (video game), a 1981 clone of Pac-Man
- The Gobbler, a former motel, supper club, and roadside attraction in Johnson Creek, Wisconsin, United States
- Gobblers, the General Oblation Board, a child-stealing religious group in Philip Pullman's novel trilogy His Dark Materials.
