= The Human Adventure =

The Human Adventure may refer to:

- The Human Adventure (video game), a 1980 game for the TRS-80 and Apple II
- The Human Adventure (TV series), a French documentary television programme
