= Asylum (1981 video game) =

- Developer(s): William F. Denman Jr.
- Publisher(s): Med Systems
- Platform(s): TRS-80
- Release: WW: February 1981
- Genre(s): Adventure
- Mode(s): Single-player

Asylum is an adventure game created by William F. Denman Jr. and released in 1981 by Med Systems (later known as Screenplay) of Chapel Hill, North Carolina for the TRS-80 computer. It combines a text adventure with simple line graphics to create a first-person perspective 3D game. Med Systems had earlier released games like Rat's Revenge, Deathmaze 5000, and Labyrinth with the same kind of graphics; these games were among the earliest commercial examples of 3D games.

A sequel named Asylum II was released in 1982. The sequel was later enhanced with bitmapped graphics, color, and improved descriptions, and released simply as Asylum for the Atari 8-bit computers in 1983, and Commodore 64 and IBM PC in 1985.

== Plot ==
The story takes place in a labyrinthine asylum. One rather confusing feature of that labyrinth is that some sections of it seem to exist in several places at once. So an item dropped in a certain place will also show up in another place of the labyrinth, in a corridor of the same shape (but different orientation), and vice versa.

== Reception ==
Debuting in February 1981, the game sold 5,000 copies by June 1982, appearing on Computer Gaming World's list of top sellers. BYTE stated that "Not only is [Asylum] a devious game, it is a very good buy for the money". PC Magazine stated that the game's use of graphics "is one of the features that makes it more exciting than Adventure". While criticizing its copy protection, the reviewer liked the time limit and stated that her daughter found the game "cool".
