= Jeepers Creepers =

Jeepers Creepers may refer to:

- "Jeepers Creepers" (song), a popular 1938 song
- Jeepers Creepers (1939 live-action film), a 1939 film starring Roy Rogers
- Jeepers Creepers (1939 animated film), a 1939 animated short film featuring Porky Pig
- Jeepers Creepers (film series), a film series originally created by Victor Salva
  - Jeepers Creepers (2001 film), a 2001 horror film written and directed by Victor Salva and the first film in the series
- Jeepers Creepers (video game), a 1982 video game

== See also ==
- "Jeepers, Creepers, Where Is Peepers?", a season-three episode of Dexter's Laboratory
- "Jeepers, It's the Creeper", a season-one episode of Scooby-Doo, Where Are You!
