= Day of the Viper =

1989 video game

- Developer: Accolade
- Publisher: Accolade
- Designers: John Conley; James Oxley
- Platforms: Amiga, Atari ST, MS-DOS
- Release: 1989
- Genres: First-person shooter, maze
- Mode: Single player

Day of the Viper is a first-person shooter video game published by Accolade in 1989. As the Viper robot, the player must explore five abandoned hi-tech and heavily guarded buildings in order to find and install floppy disks. The game was compared to 3D Monster Maze.

== Reception ==
The game was reviewed in 1990 in Dragon #157 by Hartley, Patricia, and Kirk Lesser in "The Role of Computers" column. The reviewers gave the game 5 out of 5 stars. Zzap!64 noted Day of the Viper as "an incredibly similar game" to Slaygon (1988), which is made by the same developers. Further commenting that "Charging £19.95 for a game that's two years old (and doesn't seem to have been updated) is a bit suspect."
