= 3D Maze Man: Amazing Adventures =

1998 video game

- Developer: Webfoot Technologies
- Publisher: eGames
- Composer: Ariel Gross
- Platform: Microsoft Windows
- Release: 1998
- Genres: Maze
- Mode: Single-player

3D Maze Man: Amazing Adventures is a 1998 video game for Microsoft Windows unofficially based on Namco's Pac-Man games and character. In 2000, Pac-Man licensee Hasbro (via Atari) sued to prevent the production and distribution of this and eGames' other offerings, which included a Tetris-inspired game. Per the settlement, sales continued until the end of September 2000.

== Gameplay ==
Conceptually, it is influenced by Namco's popular arcade classic Pac-Man in that the main character (Maze Man) is a yellow sphere with a triangular mouth whose goal is to collect all the pellets in the current level and avoid the enemy ghosts. Like in Pac-Man, there are pellets which allow Maze Man to, for a short period of time ("Party Time"), eat the enemy ghosts, who regenerate from a specified location. Aesthetically, however, the 3D format of the game allows for a number of other features which differentiate it from Pac-Man. It provides for the ability to jump (also seen in Pac-Mania), enabling 3D Maze Man to avoid the ghosts when not in "Party Time". Also, the navigable platforms can span multiple altitudes, allowing for sloped or "elevator" platforms. In addition, some levels include colored keys which unlock certain correspondingly colored bricks, green spaces which prevent Maze Man from jumping, and red spaces which kill Maze Man on impact.

Four other variants of 3D Maze Man also exist, all having the same gameplay style and engine, but different maze layouts and scenery. Among these is 3D Maze Man: Adventures in Winter Wonderland, which is an Xmas-themed variant, featuring the same character from the original wearing a Santa hat. The second is 3D Ms. Maze: Tropical Adventures, which features a female Maze Man, in the same style of Ms. Pac-Man, in tropical environments. The third is 3D Frog Man, in which the player controls a frog.
