= Survivors (video game) =

1986 video game

- Developer: Glynn Carey
- Publisher: Atlantis
- Platforms: Acorn Electron, Atari 8-bit, BBC Micro, C16 / Plus/4, Commodore 64, MSX, ZX Spectrum
- Release: 1986: Spectrum; 1987: Atari, BBC, C64, C16, Electron, MSX; 1988: Amstrad
- Genre: Puzzle
- Mode: Single-player

Survivors is a puzzle video game published by Atlantis Software in 1986 for the ZX Spectrum. It was ported to the MSX, Atari 8-bit computers, Commodore 64, Commodore 16, Acorn Electron, and BBC Micro (all in 1987) and the Amstrad CPC (1988). It is based on the "rocks and diamonds" mechanics of Boulder Dash.

== Gameplay ==
Start of the first level (Electron)

The game is set in 2087 in a 'hibernation dome' which has been damaged in a nuclear war. It holds 1000 survivors (who are in stasis) but cannot be accessed by humans because of fallen earth and boulders. The player must control three droids to gain access to, and teleport out, the survivors. The dome is also populated by guardian droids that had been left to maintain life support functions but have been damaged by the nuclear fallout and become hostile. The survivors must all be evacuated before the time limit runs out and the radiation becomes too strong.

The game uses the 'rocks and diamonds' mechanics as popularised in the game Boulder Dash whereby the player can dig through earth and push boulders but where boulders will fall from above if area below them is cleared. With the emphasis more on the puzzle element, Survivors is closer to Repton. The main twist with this game is that each droid can only perform one of the functions usually carried out by the player in similar games. The player must switch between droids depending on what they need to do. Droid 1 can tunnel through earth, Droid 2 can teleport survivors home (this game's equivalent of collecting diamonds) and Droid 3 can push boulders. This means that if any droid is trapped or destroyed then the game cannot be completed.

The droids lose energy if a boulder falls on top of them or if they touch one of the faulty guardian droids. The guardian droids can be destroyed by dropping boulders on them or trapped behind boulders.

== Reception ==
The game was first released for the ZX Spectrum, where it received mixed reviews. Complaints included 'jerky movement' and dull graphics and sound but praise was given for playability and value for money. Crash awarded an overall score of 70%, Your Sinclair gave it 6/10 and C&VG only gave marks between 4/10 and 5/10 (without awarding an overall score).

The game was then ported to a number of other formats where it received generally more positive reviews. Zzap!64 gave the C64 version a score of 79%, concluding that the game was "taxing both mentally and dexterously and Boulderdash fans suffering from withdrawal symptoms should enjoy Survivors quite a lot". The Micro User was even more complimentary, commenting that it "could well knock Repton off its perch", and Electron User awarded it the 'Golden Game' title with an overall score of 9/10 (including 10/10 for both playability and value for money).
