= Amidar =

1981 video game

- Arcade flyer
- Developer: Konami
- Publishers: JP: Konami; NA: Stern; Parker Brothers (2600); Casio (PV-1000)
- Platforms: Arcade, Atari 2600, PV-1000
- Release: Arcade: JP: March 1982; NA: April 1982; Atari 2600: NA: November 1982; PV-1000: JP: 1983
- Genre: Maze
- Modes: Single-player, multiplayer

Amidar is a 1982 maze video game developed and published by Konami for arcades. It was released in North America by Stern. Parker Brothers published an Atari 2600 version in late 1982, and Casio released a port for the PV-1000 in 1983. Amidar was the first in the grid capture sub-genre of maze games and was highly cloned in arcades and for home systems.

The player moves around a fixed rectilinear lattice, changing the color of the lines, while avoiding enemies. Coloring all the lines around a rectangle fills it in. When all the rectangles have been filled, the player moves to the next level. There are two types of levels which alternate, with the player controlling a paint roller in one and a gorilla in the other.

The game and its name have their roots in the Japanese lot drawing game Amidakuji. The bonus level in Amidar is a nearly exact replication of an Amidakuji game and the way the enemies move conform to the Amidakuji rules; this is referred to in the attract mode as "Amidar movement".

== Gameplay ==
The gorilla at the bottom a new level (arcade)

As in Pac-Man, the player is opposed by enemies who kill on contact. The enemies gradually expand in number as the player progresses from one level to the next, and their speed also increases. On odd-numbered levels, the player controls an ape (in some versions labeled "Copier") and must collect coconuts while avoiding headhunters (labeled "Police" and "Thief"). On even-numbered levels, the player controls a paint roller (labeled "Rustler") and must paint over each spot of the board while avoiding pigs (labeled "Cattle" and "Thief"). Each level is followed by a short bonus stage.

Whenever a rectangular portion of the board is cleared (either by collecting all surrounding coconuts, or painting all surrounding edges), the rectangle is colored in; on the even levels, bonus points are awarded while on the odd levels, the player collects points for each coconut eaten. When the player clears all four corners of the board, he is briefly empowered to kill the enemies by touching them (just as when Pac-Man uses a "power pill"). Enemies killed in this way fall to the bottom of the screen and revitalise themselves after a few moments.

The game controls consist of a joystick and a single button labeled "Jump", which can be used up to three times, resetting after a level is cleared or the player loses a life. Pressing the jump button does not cause the player to jump, but causes all the enemies to jump, enabling the player to walk under them.

Extra lives can be earned at different point totals, depending on the set-up of the machine.

=== Enemy movement ===
The enemies (and bonus stage pigs) in Amidar move deterministically; this is described in the game as "Amidar movement". Each normal-type enemy moves vertically from the top to the bottom of the screen, and then back to the top, and so on. While moving in a constant vertical direction, the enemy will take every horizontal turn available until they reach the top or bottom of the grid, where they will continue to move either left or right in the direction they are headed and then take the first vertical turn available to re-enter the game board. This ensures that, while the movement of the enemies can be predicted and avoided, there are no safe points on the grid in which the player can stay still for too long. Each level has one special enemy (the "Tracer", colored white) which, at the start of each stage, simply patrols around the perimeter of the gameboard in an anti-clockwise direction. However, following a certain number of "laps", The Tracer will begin to relentlessly pursue the player by following the path their on-screen avatar takes. While the Tracer cannot deviate from following the player's exact route, it does not mimic any pauses the player makes, meaning that hesitations or backtracking will eventually allow the Tracer to catch up and kill the player. Later levels increase the difficulty by adding more complex game grids, having more enemies, and reducing the delay before the Tracer begins pursuit, until eventually it gives chase at the beginning of each stage.

=== Level differences ===
In the even-numbered levels where the player controls a paint roller, the roller cannot move too far from grid rectangles that have already been filled without running out of paint and having to return to completed parts of the map to refresh its supply. When this happens, any painted lines which are not part of a filled rectangle will vanish and must be painted again. In practical terms, this means that the player must build their completed squares around the starting point of the level (which always has a fresh supply of paint) and spread outwards, rather than completing squares in any part of the gameboard, as they can on the odd-numbered levels. This also makes filling the corner rectangles and becoming invincible more difficult.

== Ports ==
Atari 2600 version. The player is the white sprite at right.

Amidar was ported by Parker Brothers to the Atari 2600 in 1982 and the Casio PV-1000 console in 1983. Gakken released a handheld version of Amidar in 1982. It was one of a series of three flip-top games with VFD screen and magnifying Fresnel lens.

== Legacy ==
Numerous clones and spins on Amidar have been written, creating a sub-genre of maze video games called grid capture games or line coloring games. Time Runner is an Amidar-like game for the TRS-80, Atari 8-bit computers, and C64. Kid Grid and Jeepers Creepers were published for the Atari 8-bit computers in 1982. Spiderdroid is a reskinning of the Atari 2600 version of Amidar published in 1987 by Froggo. Omidar was published by Profiteam/M&T for the C64 in 1987. Rollo and the Brush Bros. is a clone of Amidar published by Windmill software in 1984 as a self-booting disk for the IBM PC. The player controls "Rollo" while attempting to paint the entire maze and avoiding the "Brush Brothers". The arcade game Pepper II has a grid spread across four screens, while the grid in Triple Punch is wider than the screen and scrolls horizontally.

=== Competition ===
There are two ROM sets for Amidar: a harder version distributed by Stern and an easier set created by Konami. According to Twin Galaxies, Scott Karasek, of Racine, Wisconsin, USA, scored a world record 3,208,870 points on the Stern ROM set on June 22, 1982. On the Konami ROM set, Todd Lamb reached 19,225,030 points in Kenosha, Wisconsin, USA, on October 1, 1983.
