= Mines of Minos =

1982 video game

- Developer: CommaVid
- Publisher: CommaVid
- Programmer: Irwin Gaines
- Platform: Atari 2600
- Release: October 1982
- Genre: Maze
- Modes: Single-player, multiplayer

Mines of Minos on the Atari 2600

Mines of Minos is an Atari 2600 maze video game developed and published by CommaVid in 1982. The player controls a mining robot in a maze, fighting off alien attackers. A two-player mode, in which the second player can control an alien, is also available.

== Gameplay ==
The player controls a mining robot trapped in a maze surrounded by hostile aliens. The goal is to locate and destroy the alien's command center. The player must navigate the maze and avoid the aliens; colliding with an alien causes the player to lose a life. Unlike a typical video game (where the player starts with multiple lives), the player starts with zero additional lives and can only earn more by collecting robot pieces scattered throughout the maze; collecting enough pieces to form a new "robot body" awards the player with an additional life. The player can drop bombs in locations, requiring strategy to choose the best spot that an alien might walk into. The maze gradually fills with water, forcing the player to move on to the next board.

There is also a two-player mode where the second player controls an alien.

== Release ==
CommaVid released Mines of Minos in October 1982. The game was only released for the Atari 2600.

== Reception ==
The gameplay was well received. The Fort Worth Star-Telegram called Mines of Minos "an extremely intense game: constant pressure, no rest". They liked the number of mazes it offered to explore, but criticized as being a Pac-Man clone. In a 1983 review, Electronic Fun with Computers & Games wrote that the game's aliens "are stunningly scary due to their excellent resolution".

In a retrospective review, the Video Game Critic praised the game's depth and challenge. The Retroist wrote that Mines of Minos joined the slew of games "being cranked out immediately before the video game crash of 1983". It called bomb dropping mechanic a "change [from] the nature of the standard offense-oriented Atari game".
