= J. K. Greye Software =

Software companies of the United Kingdom

J.K. Greye Software
- Industry: Software
- Founded: Early 1981
- Founder: J.K. Greye
- Products: Video games

J.K. Greye Software was a British software company set up by J.K. Greye in early 1981 and six months later joined by Malcolm Evans after they met at a Bath Classical Guitar & Lute Society meeting in Bath in 1981. They produced computer games for the ZX81 and ZX Spectrum home computers.

They struck gold with the revolutionary 3D Monster Maze, the first 3D game for a home computer, which John Greye suggested they produce after seeing a basic 3D Maze that Evans had programmed in Z80 Assembler. In the spring of 1982, Evans split up the company and founded his own company, New Generation Software (a name taken from an advertising slogan by Greye), which continued to produce games for the ZX Spectrum.

Greye later set up J.K. Greye Enterprises Ltd., a separate company that split off around February–March 1983, to produce games for the ZX Spectrum.

== List of games ==
This softography is a merged list between J.K. Greye Software and J.K. Greye Enterprises Ltd.

=== Sinclair ZX81 ===
- 10 Games for 1K ZX81 (1981)
- 1K Breakout (1981)
- Catacombs (1981)
- 3D Defender (1981) (later re-released by N.G.S.)
- 3D Monster Maze (1981) (later re-released by N.G.S.)
- Pyramid (1981)
- Starfighter (1981)
- ZX81 Artist (1981) (these last three released on one "gamestape")

=== ZX Spectrum ===
- Ufo (1982)
- Minefield (1982)
- Invasion (1982)
- Kamikaze (1982)
- The Arcadian (1982)
- 3D Vortex (1983)
- 4-Star (1984)
