= Microworld (video game) =

1981 video game

- Developer: Arti Haroutunian
- Publisher: Med Systems Software
- Platforms: TRS-80, Atari 8-bit
- Release: 1981
- Genre: Interactive fiction

Microworld is a 1981 text adventure published by Med Systems Software for the TRS-80. An Atari 8-bit computer version followed.

== Gameplay ==
Microworld is a text only adventure game in which the player becomes an "electroid" and searches inside the circuits of a TRS-80 computer for colored integrated circuit chips.

== Reception ==
Allen L. Wold reviewed Microworld in The Space Gamer No. 52. Wold commented that "for the intelligent child, the adventure gaming beginner, or someone who'd just like to 'get into' his or her computer for a while, Microworld can be a lot of fun."

== Reviews ==
- SoftSide (mentioned in table of contents, but scan is cut off)
