= Knot in 3D =

1983 video game

- Developer: Malcolm Evans
- Publisher: New Generation Software
- Platform: ZX Spectrum
- Release: EU: 1983
- Genre: Action

Knot in 3D is a ZX Spectrum action game by Malcolm Evans published in 1983 by New Generation Software. It resembles a three-dimensional (i.e. with three degrees of freedom instead of only two) version of the Light cycles game from the film Tron.

== Gameplay ==
Gameplay screenshot

The game takes place in a 16 × 16 × 16 three-dimensional grid with the display being a first-person view of what the player can see in front of them. Initially empty, this space is filled up by the player (who constantly moves forward) leaving a trail behind them. There are a number of computer-controlled "chasers" doing the same thing who leave a differently coloured trail behind them. As the player and the chasers move through the grid, it becomes more and more densely filled, and therefore there is a greater likelihood of crashing into a trail and need to change direction to avoid the trails.

== Reception ==
Crash magazine commented that it was hard to see how Knot worked at first, but described it as extraordinary and addictive. ZX Computing also said that Knot was initially confusing until the player is used to the perspective. The graphics were highlighted as some of the best fast-action colour graphics on the ZX Spectrum.

In 1997, Next Generation reflected on Knot in 3D as "a landmark title blighted by the inability of most players to think in terms of three dimensions fast enough."

In 1991 Your Sinclair magazine ranked the game 60th in their top 100 Spectrum games of all time.
