= The World's Hardest Game =

2007 video game

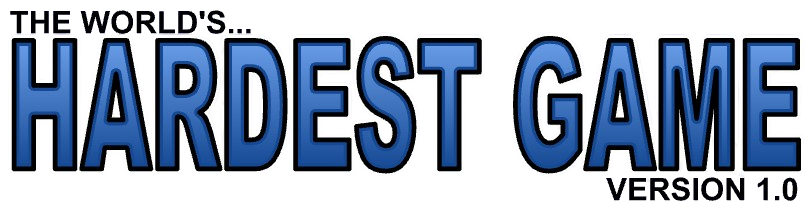
- Developer: Stephen Critoph
- Publishers: Armor Games, AddictingGames
- Composer: Snayk
- Engine: Adobe Flash
- Platforms: Browser iOS
- Release: 15 December 2007
- Genres: Maze, puzzle

The World's Hardest Game is a 2007 Flash maze game developed by Stephen Critoph, also known as Snubby Land. In it, players control a red square and must get from one end of a maze to another while avoiding obstacles and collecting coins. It was also released for iOS in 2009. It became popular online in the 2000s due to its high difficulty level, which–as critics have noted–contrasts with its visual simplicity.

== Gameplay ==
In The World's Hardest Game, players control a red square and must move from one green box to another, avoiding all blue circles and collecting all coins, in order to progress to the next level.

The World's Hardest Game is a top-down maze and puzzle browser game in which players control a red square with the arrow keys and progress through 30 increasingly difficult levels by guiding it from a green box on one end of a maze to another green box at the other end. Other green boxes also appear in some levels between the two as checkpoints. Moving blue dots appear as obstacles and, if they are hit, a "punch" sound effect plays and the level restarts. The amount of player deaths is recorded in the upper-right corner of the screen. Players also must collect all coins before progressing to the next level. The game is largely dependent on players' reaction times.

The game's iOS version offers three difficulty options (Hard, Harder, and Impossible) and players can control the square either by sliding their finger across the touchscreen or by tilting the device.

== Development and release ==
The World's Hardest Game was created using Adobe Flash and published as a browser game on AddictingGames.com on 15 December 2007. An iOS port of the game was released by AddictingGames in 2009. It also spawned multiple sequel games.

== Reception and legacy ==
Holly Platt-Higgins wrote for Secret London that, despite the game "look[ing] easy", she failed to advance past its first level. iPhone in Canada similarly wrote in their review of the game's iOS port that its "simple" visual style made it appear easy, but that its levels were "very simple yet extremely difficult". They also gave it a score of four and a half out of five and praised it for "work[ing] perfectly on the iPhone". Hannah Marder wrote for BuzzFeed that, though the game's title "seems like clickbait", it was "actually crazy hard" following the game's introductory levels. The World's Hardest Game was nominated for the award for Most Addicting Game at Nickelodeon's AddictingGames Showdown in 2009.

By 2018, The World's Hardest Game had been played more than 75 million times. MEL's Eddie Kim described The World's Hardest Game in 2016 as an "appropriately titled", "deeply creative and deceivingly complex puzzle" that was developed during Adobe Flash's "heyday", during which developers could create and publish games with relatively few barriers. Cecilia D'Anastasio, writing for Wired, identified it as one of many "bawdy Flash games" that became "cultural currency" in the 2000s and wrote that children spent "hours and hours" playing it. In 2020, Ed Thorn of Rock Paper Shotgun compared the feeling of having beaten the game more than ten years prior to that of "[winning] gold at the Olympics". DJ Dave's 2024 song "World Hardest Game" was named after the game and inspired by its soundtrack.
