= The Amazing Adventures of Mr. F. Lea =

1982 video game

Mr. F. Lea
- Developer: Pacific Novelty
- Publisher: Pacific Novelty
- Platform: Arcade
- Release: February 1982
- Genre: Action
- Modes: Single-player, multiplayer

Mr. F. Lea's interpretation of Frogger

The Amazing Adventures of Mr. F. Lea, shortened to Mr. F. Lea on the cabinet marquee, is an arcade video game released by Pacific Novelty in 1982. It is a collection of four canine-themed minigames that borrow gameplay elements from Donkey Kong, Frogger, and Jungle Hunt, and a fourth game where Mr. F. Lea runs up a dog's back, jumping over spots and bursting balloons. The player chooses which minigame to play next until all four have been completed, then progressing to the next round.
