= Atlantis Software =

Former company

- Industry: Video games
- Founded: 1984
- Founder: Michael Cole, Rodger Coghill
- Headquarters: London, England
- Products: Computer games

Atlantis Software was a London-based UK computer games publisher that released a number of games during the 1980s and early 1990s.

The company was set up by Michael Cole and Rodger Coghill in January 1984 with the first four games released in May of that year. The philosophy of the company was to sell high volume at low 'pocket-money' prices: initially, all games were £1.99. The Atlantis Gold label was launched the following year at £2.99, but the Gold tag was soon dropped, with games at both prices being released under the Atlantis logo but with the suggested price on the cover.

The company's primary focus remained on the low-cost cassette-based games for 8-bit machines for £1.99 and £2.99 (commonly known as "budget" games) that formed a significant part of the UK 8-bit software market during the 1980s.

They later also moved into the 16-bit disk-based market and published games for the Atari ST and Amiga.

== Selected titles ==
- Master Mariner, 1984 (ZX Spectrum)
- Monster Munch, 1984 (Commodore 64)
- Cops 'n' Robbers, 1985 (VIC-20, C64, Commodore 16, Acorn Electron, BBC Micro, Atari 8-bit)
- Death Race, 1985 (VIC-20, C64, C16, Atari 8-bit)
- League Challenge, 1986 (Spectrum, C64, C16, Electron, BBC, Atari 8-bit, Amstrad CPC, Amiga, Atari ST)
- Survivors, 1986 (Spectrum, C64, C16, Electron, BBC, Atari 8-bit, CPC, MSX)
- Panik!, 1986 (C16, Electron, BBC, Atari 8-bit)
- Gunfighter, 1988 (Spectrum, C64, Electron, BBC, Atari 8-bit, CPC)
- Crack-Up!, 1989 (Spectrum, C64, Electron, BBC, Atari 8-bit, CPC)
- Encounter!, 1989 (Atari 8-bit, Commodore 64)
- Cavemania, 1990 (Spectrum, C64, CPC, Amiga, ST)
- Hobgoblin, 1990 (Spectrum, C64, Electron, BBC, CPC)
- Apache Flight, 1992 (Amiga, ST)

Dates shown are for the first version. In many cases, ports to other machines were released over a number of years (e.g. League Challenge wasn't ported to Amiga until 1991).
