= Super Taxman 2 =

1981 video game

- Developer: Brian Fitzgerald
- Publisher: H.A.L. Labs
- Platform: Apple II
- Release: 1981
- Genre: Maze

Super Taxman 2 is a 1981 video game published by H.A.L. Labs.

== Gameplay ==
Super Taxman 2 is a game in which the player must navigate four different mazes in this version of the original Taxman.

== Reception ==
Anthony Melendez reviewed the game for Computer Gaming World, and stated that "Despite the fact that maze-chase games have been overused, ST2 is a nice little game."
