= Pacific Novelty =

Arcade video game developer

Pacific Novelty was a developer of coin-operated arcade video games. Deep Death was their first title, which was later licensed by Game Plan and re-released as Shark Attack (1981). Thief, a Pac-Man styled maze chase, was their greatest success.

== Development history ==
- Deep Death (1980)
- Shark Attack (Rerelease of Deep Death) (1981)
- Thief (1981)
- NATO Defense (1982)
- The Amazing Adventures of Mr. F. Lea (1982)
- Pop-A-Ball (1988) (non-video redemption game)
- Pop-A-Ball II (1990) (non-video redemption game)
