= Lady Bug (video game) =

1981 video game

- Arcade flyer
- Developer: Universal
- Publishers: Arcade: JP/NA: Universal; UK: Electrocoin; EU: Electrocoin/ADP; Ports; Coleco
- Designer: Kazutoshi Ueda
- Platforms: Arcade, ColecoVision, Intellivision
- Release: Arcade: JP: October 1981; WW: December 1981; ColecoVision: November 1982; Intellivision: June 1983
- Genre: Maze
- Modes: Single-player, multiplayer

Lady Bug (Note: Japanese: レディーバグ, Hepburn: Redī Bagu) is a 1981 maze video game developed and published by Universal for arcades. Its gameplay is similar to Pac-Man, with the addition of turnstiles that change the layout of the maze, adding an element of strategy to the genre. A port to the ColecoVision was a launch title for the console.

== Gameplay ==
Arcade screenshot

The goal of Lady Bug is to eat all flowers, hearts, and letters in the maze while avoiding other insects. The player is represented by a red, yellow, and green character resembling a ladybug and the enemy insects' appearance varies by level. The border of the maze acts as timer, with each circuit signaling the release of an enemy insect from the central area, up to generally a maximum of four. The speed of the circuit increases on stages 2 and 5.

There are eight different enemy insects, and a different one is introduced on each of the first eight levels. Beginning on level 9, each level has four different enemies.

Unlike Pac-Man, the player can alter the layout of the maze by shifting any of the twenty green gates. It is not possible to completely isolate a portion of the maze through gate-shifting.

== Release ==
Lady Bug was adapted to the Intellivision and ColecoVision home video game consoles. In the ColecoVision version, completing SPECIAL puts the player into a bonus level (known in-game as a "Vegetable Harvest") where the goal is to consume as many randomly placed vegetables as possible within a fixed time. The SPECIAL register does not appear in the Intellivision version. In 1982, a catalog of Atari 2600 cartridges manufactured by Coleco said that an Atari 2600 version would be released, but Coleco never did. Lady Bug was re-released as Fighting Bug on the Casio PV-1000 in Japan, one of only 13 games released for that platform.

== Reception ==
According to Electronic Games magazine, Lady Bug did "just all right in the arcades" but became popular as a console cartridge. It said the ColecoVision version is "proving to be one of the most successful home videogames ever".

The arcade game was recognized for its originality within the maze game genre. In January 1983, the fourth Arcade Awards gave it a Certificate of Merit as runner-up for Most Innovative Coin-Op Game, stating that the "addition of turnstiles to the labyrinth" made the game "a fascinating contest packed with strategic nuances never before equalled in this particular genre of coin-op". Electronic Games called it "the most wonderful blend of strategy and maze-chase thrills ever concocted".

Reviewing the ColecoVision version, Creative Computing Video & Arcade Games said in 1983 that Lady Bug is not a Pac-Man clone, stating that the movable turnstiles "set it apart from all other maze games". The magazine reported that the ColecoVision version had become more popular than the arcade game at its office. It was reviewed in Video magazine's "Arcade Alley" column, described as "a maze-chase game with all the high-speed action and thrills of Pac-Man combined with strategy-oriented play and pinball-style bonus features". Its sound and graphics were reported to "equal, if not actually surpass, the original", emphasizing the innovative use of "color sequencing and the revolving turnstiles". The most significant criticism was that "the movement control is stiff and somewhat jerky". This version was popular, winning the Videogame of the Year award in the "16K or more ROM" category at the 5th annual Arkie Awards where the judges described it as an "outstanding home edition of a coin-op-palace cult favorite". The game has received appreciation in later years, being praised by some as "the most challenging of the Pac-clones... It was, and still is, one of the best [of the clones]."

== Legacy ==
Doodle Bug is a 1982 clone for the TRS-80 Color Computer. Bumble Bee replaces the main character with a bumblebee and the enemies with spiders; it was released in 1983 and 1984 by Micro Power for the BBC Micro, Acorn Electron, and Commodore 64.

Doodle Bug (1985) for the VIC-20 (unrelated to the TRS-80 Color Computer game) and Drelbs (1983) for the Atari 8-bit computers both have mazes with turnstiles in them.

Hamster Corporation released the game as part of their Arcade Archives series for the Nintendo Switch and PlayStation 4, as well as their Arcade Archives 2 series for the Nintendo Switch 2, PlayStation 5 and Xbox Series X/S in July 2026.

== See also ==
- Mouse Trap (1981)
