= Dunzhin =

1982 video game

- Publishers: Med Systems (TRS-80); Screenplay
- Designer: Randall Don Masteller
- Series: Warrior of Ras
- Platforms: Apple II, Atari 8-bit, Commodore 64, IBM PC, TRS-80
- Release: 1982: TRS-80, Apple II, Atari 8-bit, IBM PC; 1983: C64
- Genre: Role-playing
- Mode: Single-player

Dunzhin (fully titled, but not shown on the box cover, as Warrior of Ras: Volume I - Dunzhin) is a fantasy role-playing video game developed by Med Systems Software. It was released on the TRS-80 in 1982, then ported to the Apple II, Atari 8-bit computers, and Commodore 64. An IBM PC port, as a self-booting disk, added digitized speech.

== Gameplay ==
Dunzhin is a game in which the player explores a new, randomly generated dungeon each time the game is played. The fighter player character encounters monsters and human enemies, and the character earns experience points based on the disparity comparing their statistics with those of the monster. The player is in search of a well-guarded treasure located on the deepest level of the dungeon.

== Development ==
Dunzhin was designed by Randall Don Masteller and developed by Intelligent Statements, Inc. It was the first instalment in the Warriors of Ras series, which also included Kaiv, The Wylde and Ziggurat. The game's original instructions credited its rules to the 1978 tabletop role-playing game The Game: Fantasy Edition, published by I.Y. Games.

== Reception ==
Dunzhin was reviewed in Dragon magazine #71 by John Warren. The reviewer noted that while this game was able to accept more complex commands than other games of its time, the extra typing involved slowed the game down. Describing Warriors of Ras as "yet another Dungeons-and-Dragons style game series", The Commodore 64 Home Companion wrote that Dunzhin "is the first—and easiest—in the series".

In a September 1984 review for Family Computing, James Delson awarded Dunzhin four out of four stars for overall performance, documentation and play system, and three stars for graphics quality and value. Although he considered the game somewhat dated, he recommended it to younger players and newcomers to fantasy role-playing games.

Writing in Ahoy! in November 1985, Arnie Katz discussed Dunzhin alongside the other three Warriors of Ras games. He compared the series with Gateway to Apshai, finding its graphics less detailed but considering the games comparable in the variety of activities available to players.
