= Corridors of Genon =

1983 video game

- Cover art
- Publisher: New Generation Software
- Designer: Malcolm Evans
- Platform: ZX Spectrum
- Release: EU: 1983
- Genres: Maze

Corridors of Genon is a first-person maze video game for the ZX Spectrum developed by New Generation Software and released in 1983.

Screenshot

== Reception ==
Crash: "An unusually addictive game for those who don't mind a bit of figuring" 72/100

Personal Computer Games: "The 3D graphics are up to New Generations usual high standard and the sound is also very well used. But I would say the game lacks the sort of variation which has made games like Arcadia and Manic Miner such big hits" 5/10

Sinclair User: "Corridors of Genon is an excellent 3D game from a master of 3D techniques. We cannot recommend it too highly"
