= Jawbreaker (video game) =

1981 video game

- Publishers: On-Line Systems; Tigervision (2600)
- Programmers: Atari 8-bit, 2600; John Harris; Apple II; Olaf Lubeck
- Platforms: Atari 8-bit, Apple II, Atari 2600, Commodore 64
- Release: Atari 8-bit, Apple II: NA: 1981; 2600: NA: October 1982; Commodore 64: NA: 1983
- Genre: Maze
- Mode: Single-player

Jawbreaker is a Pac-Man clone programmed by John Harris for Atari 8-bit computers and published by On-Line Systems. Released in 1981 before an official version of Pac-Man was available, it was widely lauded by reviewers and became a major seller. The story of its creation and Harris's Atari 8-bit implementation of Frogger form a portion of Steven Levy's 1984 book, Hackers: Heroes of the Computer Revolution.

Jawbreaker was ported to the Apple II in 1981 and Harris's different take on the game for the Atari 2600 was released the following year. Legal issues resulted in the 2600 port being the template for subsequent versions—for the Commodore 64 and TI-99/4A—and sold confusingly as both Jawbreaker and Jawbreaker II.

== Failed licensing and litigation ==
Atari 2600 gameplay

In 1982, the initial Atari 800 version of Jawbreaker was so faithful to Pac-Man that the game (carelessly leaked by Harris himself) was assumed to be from Atari, Inc. (licensee for Pac-Man's home rights) itself. When one of these early copies found its way to Atari, they reached out to On-Line's Ken Williams. Attempts at a deal fell apart due to culture clashes between Atari and On-Line, particularly Williams and Harris. Williams instructed Harris to alter the artwork for the game to have a dental theme.

Atari unsuccessfully sought an injunction against the sale of Jawbreaker and Gobbler, another On-Line computer game, which Atari claimed unduly resembled Pac-Man, and cited early leaked copies. Williams denied Atari's claim but was uncertain of the outcome, stating "If this opens the door to other programmers ripping off my software, what happened here was a bad thing".

== Ports ==
Because of technical limitations, Atari 2600 Jawbreaker is not a Pac-Man clone and is different than the Atari 8-bit game. A rough sketch of the 2600 game was used as the basis for new computer versions from programmers other than Harris. The new game was, confusingly, sold as both Jawbreaker and Jawbreaker II; it was not as successful as the original.

== Reception ==
John Anderson reviewed the game for Computer Gaming World, and stated that "As for the graphics and sound, when I first saw the program, I could not bring myself to believe the game was not written by Atari. It is not only truly addictive, but also "paced"—that is, you get tougher, the enemy gets tougher, Four stars to this one." InfoWorld's Essential Guide to Atari Computers cited it as among the best Sierra arcade games.

Jawbreaker was well received by critics and it was given the award for "Best Computer Action Game" in 1982 at the 3rd annual Arkie Awards. Arkie Award judges described the game as "a must for 'Pac Man' fans lucky enough to own an Atari 400 or 800 computer," and specifically praised the game's music (a chiptune version of "The Candy Man").

In 1983, Softline readers named Jawbreaker second on its Top Thirty list of Atari 8-bit programs by popularity, behind only Star Raiders. The magazine called the game "a very clean, fast-action game with little sophistication", citing its "clean, fast, and cheerful" graphics and consistent gameplay across platforms, including the Atari 2600. David H. Ahl of Creative Computing Video & Arcade Games said of Jawbreaker and Snack Attack, "for PacMan fans, either is recommended".
