= New Generation Software =

Defunct video game company

- Industry: Video games
- Founded: 1982
- Founder: Malcolm Evans
- Defunct: 1986
- Headquarters: United Kingdom
- Products: 3D Monster Maze, Trashman

New Generation Software was an early British video games developer producing games for the Sinclair ZX81 and ZX Spectrum computers. It was conceived in the spring of 1982 shortly after the lead developer, Malcolm Evans created 3D Monster Maze (initially released by J. K. Greye Software, and later republished by New Generation Software)—one of the first 3D games for a home computer.

== Company history ==
New Generation was started by Malcolm Evans, who had previously been in computer hardware. The other core members of the team were teenagers Paul Bunn and James Day, sixteen and nineteen years old in 1984. The company released games from 1982 to 1986. By 2005, copyright to New Generation Software games was held by Titus Games.

== Games released ==
- 3D Monster Maze, 1982
- 3D Tunnel, 1983
- Amazon Warrior, 1985
- Arcana, 1986
- Cliff Hanger, 1984
- Corridors of Genon, 1983
- The Custard Kid, 1985
- Escape, 1982
- Jonah Barrington's Squash, 1985
- Knot in 3D, 1983
- Shoot the Rapids, 1985
- Trashman, 1984
- Travel With Trashman, 1984

== Other software ==
- The Complete Machine Code Tutor, 1984
- Light Magic, 1985
