= The Human Adventure (video game) =

1980 video game

- Developers: William F. Denman, Jr.
- Publisher: Med Systems Software
- Designers: William F. Denman, Jr.
- Platforms: TRS-80, Apple II
- Release: 1980

The Human Adventure is a game written by William F. Denman, Jr. and published by Med Systems Software in 1980 for the TRS-80 and Apple II.

== Gameplay ==
The Human Adventure is a game which follows miniaturized scientists traveling through a person's bloodstream to fight cancer. The game is controlled via single-word commands.

== Reception ==
Russ Williams reviewed The Human Adventure in The Space Gamer No. 47. Williams commented that "This is basically a nifty little game based on a popular SF theme. It has the added advantage of being educational. I learned more about human anatomy from this game than I did in my biology class!"
