= CommaVid =

Atari 2600 game developer and publisher

- Formerly: Computer Magic Video
- Industry: Video game development and publishing
- Founded: 1981
- Founders: Irwin Gaines; John Bronstein; Joseph Biel
- Defunct: 1983
- Fate: Defunct
- Headquarters: Aurora, Illinois, United States

CommaVid was a game developer and publisher for the Atari 2600 that released six games between 1981 and 1983, plus a programming tool for the console. The company was founded by Dr. Irwin Gaines, Dr. John Bronstein, and Dr. Joseph Biel under the name Computer Magic Video, which was shortened to Com Ma Vid, or CommaVid. It was based in Aurora, Illinois. In addition to developing its own titles, CommaVid ported the arcade game Venture to the 2600 for Coleco which was released in 1982.

CommaVid's game were mostly swept up in the video game crash of 1983, but several, such as Mines of Minos, received positive reviews. In 2010 the Retroist wrote, "CommaVid is one of those companies whose games are hit or miss. But even when it is a miss, the games usually bring something interesting to the table".

== Products ==
=== Games ===
The following games were released by CommaVid:

- Cakewalk, similar to Tapper in gameplay
- Cosmic Swarm
- Mines of Minos
- Room of Doom
- Stronghold

=== MagiCard ===
MagiCard is an Atari 2600 programming tool on a cartridge that originally came with a 128-page manual and was only available via mail order. According to CommaVid co-owner Gaines, 50 to 100 MagiCard cartridges were produced.

=== Video Life ===
Video Life is a version of the cellular automaton known as Conway's Game of Life for the Atari 2600. Video Life was only available through a special mail order offer to owners of CommaVid's MagiCard. Fewer than 20 cartridges of Video Life were made. A 2003 report in the Chicago Reader estimated that cartridges would sell for as much $3000 at the time.

=== Unreleased ===
- Frog Demo
- Mission Omega
- Rush Hour
- Underworld
