= Med Systems Software =

Med Systems Software was a company that produced video games for home computers in the early 1980s. In 1983, the company name was changed to Screenplay.

== History ==
Med Systems Software was headquartered in Chapel Hill, North Carolina.

== Games ==
- Deathmaze 5000 (1980, by Frank Corr)
- Labyrinth (1980)
- Asylum (1981)
- The Institute (1981)
- Laser Defense (1981, by Simon Smith)
- The Human Adventure (1981, by William F. Denman Jr.)
- Microworld (1981, by Arti Haroutunian)
- Asylum II (1982)
- Dunzhin (1982)
- Phantom Slayer (1982)
- Danger Ranger (1983)
- Monkey Kong (1983)
