= Slaygon =

1987 video game

- Publisher: MicroDeal
- Programmers: James Oxley; Timothy Purves (Amiga)
- Artist: John Conley
- Platforms: Atari ST, Atari ST
- Release: 1988
- Genres: First-person shooter, maze
- Mode: Single-player

Slaygon is a first-person shooter written for the Atari ST by James Oakley and John Conley and published by MicroDeal in 1988. It was ported to the Amiga. In Slaygon, the player is a military robot moving through a maze and shooting other robots.

== Gameplay ==
The player controls a military robot. The mission is to infiltrate and destroy a laboratory that is manufacturing a deadly virus. The laboratory is basically a maze and is filled with robot guards. The mission must be completed before the robot's power supply runs out. The game is depicted from a first-person view.

== Development ==
The game was written in GFA BASIC.

== Reception ==
Reception

Review scores
| Publication | Score |
|---|---|
| Aktueller Software Markt | 29/40 (ST) |
| The Games Machine (UK) | 54% (ST) |
| Tilt | 12/20 (ST) |
| Atari ST User | 7/10 |
| CU Amiga | 5/10 |
| Datormagazin | 3.8/5 (Amiga) |
| Génération 4 | 31% |
| .info | 3+/5 (Amiga) |
| Power Play | 4.5/10 (ST) |
| Your Amiga | 66/100 |

Slaygon received generally average critical reception. The Games Machine said: "The locations to visit and tasks to perform are very similar throughout Slaygon, so tedium sets in quickly." Your Amiga summarized: "[...] Slaygon looks good and plays well initially but there is no real lasting challenge offered." CU Amiga said the game is "Difficult to get into, unimpressive to play, and exceptionally easy to get bored with." Atari ST User thought the game "should appeal to a wide range of players who are more impressed with depth of gameplay than with flashy graphics or sophisticated animation." .info said: "Slaygon has enough suspense, strategy, and challenge to keep you coming back. If you like hi-tech combat, you'll like Slaygon." Zzap!64 reviewing Day of the Viper (1989), which is made by the same developers, noted it as "an incredibly similar game" to Slaygon. Further commenting that "Charging £19.95 for a game that's two years old (and doesn't seem to have been updated) is a bit suspect."
