= Doodle Bug =

1985 maze chase game published by Mastertronic

Doodle Bug is a maze chase game for the VIC-20 published by Mastertronic in 1985. The goal is to collect all of the items while avoiding pursuers. Like the 1981 Lady Bug arcade video game, there are turnstiles which can be pushed and affect the layout of the maze

== Reception ==
Commodore Use said: "I found it about as addictive as a trip to the dentist but then I've got Jelly Monsters if I want a burst of pacmania. Doodle Bug is fine if you must have a maze gobbler, but not brilliant." Videogiochi reviewed the game in issue #30. Commodore Horizons said: "Nicely programmed, and perfectly good fun." Commodore Computer Club gave it a rating of 8.
