= Bable Terror =

1982 video game

- Developers: Funsoft, Inc.
- Publishers: Funsoft, Inc.
- Programmer: Yves Lempereur
- Platform: TRS-80
- Release: 1982
- Genre: Maze

Bable Terror is a maze video game for the TRS-80 written by Yves Lempereur and published by Funsoft in 1982.

== Gameplay ==
Title Screen

Bable Terror is a game in which the player is a knight returning from the crusades searching for 10 crosses in a maze.

== Reception ==
Dick McGrath reviewed the game for Computer Gaming World, giving Babel Terror a 6 out of 10 score.
