= Monster Munch (video game) =

1983 video game

- Cover art
- Publisher: Atlantis Software
- Programmer: Mark Trotter
- Platform: Commodore 64
- Release: 1983
- Genres: Maze
- Mode: Single-player

Monster Munch is a clone of Pac-Man programmed by Mark Trotter for the Commodore 64. It was published by Atlantis Software in 1983.

== Gameplay ==
The player must guide the character of "Munchie" around the maze so that he eats all of the white dots. Munchie is pursued by monsters, which cause the character to be killed by a bolt of lightning, losing one of three lives. Eating a flashing power pill turns the monsters blue, during which time Munchie is able to eat them for bonus points. A question mark occasionally appears, which can be eaten for a mystery bonus. When all the dots are eaten, the player is presented with a new, more dangerous screen.
