= Scarfman =

1981 video game

- Publisher: The Cornsoft Group
- Designer: Philip A. Oliver
- Platforms: TRS-80, TRS-80 Color Computer
- Release: 1981: TRS-80; 1982: CoCo
- Genre: Maze

Scarfman is a clone of Pac-Man written by Philip A. Oliver for the TRS-80 computer and published by The Cornsoft Group in 1981. A version for the TRS-80 Color Computer followed in 1982 as Color Scarfman.

Oliver also wrote the Enhanced BASIC Compiler for the TRS-80 Model III and 4.

== Gameplay ==
The player controls Scarfman, eating the dots in a maze filled with them along with five power capsules, avoiding the five monsters that roam the maze. Unlike Pac-Man, there are five monsters instead of four. Eating a power pill causes monsters to lower their eyes, indicating that they're vulnerable. The eyes shift to the normal position when the pill's effect wears off. In Color Scarfman, eating a power pill causes the ghosts to remain vulnerable—indicated by turning blue—until eaten or the level ends.

== Reception ==
Dan Ekblaw reviewed Scarfman in The Space Gamer number 54. Ekblaw commented that "Overall, I would say that Scarfman's defects outweigh its good points by far. I've found that this game loses its novelty after a few weeks and will spend the rest of its days sitting on a shelf".

In a 2012 retrospective, Gamasutra wrote that the "chirp-chirp-chirp chomping sound effect is maddening. But it does play like Pac-Man, more or less".
