= Triple Punch =

1982 video game

- Developer: K. K. International
- Publishers: Thomas Automatics; Nicole Manufacturing
- Platform: Arcade
- Release: 1982
- Genre: Maze
- Modes: Single-player, multiplayer

Triple Punch (also sold as Knock Out!!) is a horizontally scrolling grid capture game developed by K. K. International of Japan. It was released as an arcade video game in 1982. The goal is to fill all the rectangles in the level by coloring the lines surrounding them. Four different enemies chase the player along the lines and all except one can be knocked out by three consecutive punches. It was sold both as a conversion kit and as an upright cabinet.

== Gameplay ==
The player controls a character referred to as a carpenter who resembles Mario from the original Donkey Kong. Much like Amidar, the objective is to color the lines around all the rectangles, except in Triple Punch the game board is larger than the screen and scrolls horizontally. The scrolling playfield wraps around; it is possible to return to the starting point by continuously moving to the right (or left). Completing two or three rectangles at the same time doubles or quadruples the point values.

Four enemies chase the player: an eraser, a ghost ("Ottobake"), a gorilla ("Gorigon"), and a fire. The eraser removes already painted lines. The eraser, ghost, and gorilla can be knocked out with three punches in rapid succession, then an ambulance takes them away. The fire is always deadly.

== See also ==
- Pepper II
