= Deathmaze 5000 =

1980 video game

- Publisher: Med Systems Software
- Programmers: Frank Corr, Jr.
- Series: Continuum
- Platforms: Apple II, TRS-80
- Release: 1980

Deathmaze 5000 is a video game written by Frank Corr, Jr. for the TRS-80 and published by Med Systems Software in 1980. It was ported to the Apple II and followed by the second game in the Continuum series, Labyrinth.

== Gameplay ==
Deathmaze 5000 is a first-person graphic adventure in which the player move through the labyrinthine hallways of a five-story building to escape and avoid starving to death. The adventurer must fight monsters, collect objects, and solve puzzles.

== Reception ==
Russ Williams reviewed Deathmaze 5000 in The Space Gamer No. 47. Williams commented that "Deathmaze 5000 is an excellent game which will not be solved in a few weeks. If you like the prospect of a game that could last you for a very long time, get it. It's better than many [more expensive] games I've seen, both in price and in gaming value."
