= Labyrinth (1980 video game) =

- Publisher: Med Systems Software
- Designers: Frank Corr, Jr. William F. Denman, Jr.
- Series: Continuum
- Platform: TRS-80
- Release: 1980
- Genre: Adventure

Labyrinth is a 1980 adventure video game published by Med Systems Software for TRS-80. It is the second game in the Continuum series, following Deathmaze 5000.

== Contents ==
Labyrinth is a game where the player travels through a maze looking for clues as well as tools to help kill the Minotaur.

== Reception ==
J. Mishcon reviewed Labyrinth in The Space Gamer No. 38. Mishcon commented that "This is truly one of the best adventure games by any criteria. At [the price] it borders on unbelievable. Believe it. Buy it."
