= Pepper II =

1982 video game

- Developer: Exidy
- Publishers: Exidy; Coleco (ColecoVision)
- Designer: Larry Hutcherson
- Programmer: Larry Hutcherson
- Platforms: Arcade; ColecoVision
- Release: 1982
- Genre: Maze
- Mode: Single-player

Pepper II is an arcade video game developed by Exidy and released in 1982. Despite its name, there was no predecessor named Pepper or Pepper I. Coleco published a port of Pepper II for its ColecoVision home system in 1983. The ColecoVision version supports one or two players, and offers four selectable skill levels.

As in Amidar by Konami, the goal is to color the lines on a grid; each rectangle is filled in after being completely surrounded. The grid in Pepper II consists of four connected screens that make up a single level.

The game plays Gounod's "Funeral March of a Marionette" when gameplay starts.

== Gameplay ==
There are four mazes per level in Pepper II. Each maze has exits leading to three other mazes. All four mazes must be filled to advance to the next level. To fill in a maze, the player maneuvers "Pepper" around different segments of the maze. As Pepper travels, he leaves a "zipper". Once he encloses or "zips" a segment, it fills in and points are awarded. If Pepper backtracks on an uncompleted segment, it unzips.

The character "Pepper" is an angel. There are two types of enemies that must be avoided: Roaming Eyes and the Whippersnapper (Zipper Ripper on the ColecoVision version) who unzips all uncompleted zipped segments by moving over them. Pepper's one defense is to enclose an area containing a pitchfork, which turns him into a devil for approximately four seconds. At that time he can go after all Roaming Eyes for points while the Whippersnapper freezes. There are four pitchforks in the corners of every maze. A deluxe energizer is located in the center of each maze. This energizer alternates between being a pitchfork and a halo symbol. If Pepper encloses the middle area when the energizer is a halo, the Whippersnapper disappears from the maze.

Points are made for enclosing a segment, consuming a pair of roaming eyes when energized by the pitchfork (similar to Pac-Man), obtaining prizes, completing a maze, and completing four mazes. A bonus turn is awarded at 40,000, 50,000, 70,000 or 90,000 points, depending on the dip switch settings. When a full screen (of the four) has been completely filled, "Zip-a-Dee-Doo-Dah" is briefly heard. When four full screens are completed, a small cube appears at the bottom of the screen to mark your progress at completing cubes.

Each maze also contains a prize in one of the segments. The player must enclose the area it appears in to gain the prize and points, and then the prize is shown beneath the maze.

=== Reviews ===
- Games #44

== See also ==
- Triple Punch
