= The Amazing Maze Game =

1976 video game

- Arcade flyer
- Developer: Midway
- Publisher: Midway
- Platform: Arcade
- Release: 1976
- Genre: Maze
- Modes: Single-player, multiplayer
- Arcade system: Intel 8080-based hardware

The Amazing Maze Game is an arcade video game developed by Midway and released in 1976. Using a black-and-white CRT screen and running on an Intel 8080 CPU, it is considered one of the earliest maze games produced and also displays an early example of the phrase "game over".

== Gameplay ==
A game in progress

The game is centered around a top-down maze, which is randomly generated each time it is played. In the maze, there are openings on both the left and right sides, where the second and first player will start from respectively. The goal of the game is for each player to find their way through the maze to reach the other player's starting position, before the other player makes it to theirs. The game can be played by two players or solo against the computer, where the player always starts on the right side.

Upon starting the game, a random maze is generated using Prim's algorithm, and each player (or only player when against the computer) is given five seconds of time to look over the maze to find the fastest path through. After this delay, the players are allowed to move by using the two joysticks on the arcade cabinet. Once a player has reached their goal position, the game will display the fastest possible route from one side to the other, which is also the exact route that the computer would take when playing solo. A point is then added to the winning player's score.

=== Screen ===
At the top of the screen, the text MAZES TO PLAY is displayed, followed by the number of mazes left before a winner is determined. If the game is against the computer, this text will be replaced with KEEP PLAYING if the player ends up winning. On the bottom left of the screen is a timer showing the time spent in the current maze, though while the five-second delay is present, it shows the number of seconds left to study the maze. The bottom right shows either a counter with the number of mazes completed when playing solo, or a countdown timer from six minutes that persists between mazes when playing against another player. Additionally, when playing with two players, the left and right sides of the screen show the current scores for the second and first player respectively.

== Trivia ==
- The game has some inconsistency in its name, since the screen names it as "The Amazing Maze Game", while the bezel names it as "Amazing Maze", and the rest of the cabinet just says "Maze".

== See also ==
- Maze Craze
