= Time Runner (video game) =

1982 video game

- Publisher: Funsoft
- Designer: Yves Lempereur
- Programmers: TRS-80, Atari 8-bit Yves Lempereur; Commodore 64; Scott Maxwell; Troy Lyndon
- Platforms: TRS-80, Atari 8-bit, Commodore 64
- Release: 1982: TRS-80, Atari 8-bit 1983: C64
- Genre: Maze
- Mode: Single-player

Time Runner is a maze video game, similar to Konami's Amidar arcade game, published by Funsoft in 1981. It was written for the TRS-80 by Yves Lempereur who also wrote a version for Atari 8-bit computers released the same year. A port to the Commodore 64 by Scott Maxwell and Troy Lyndon was published in 1983.

== Gameplay ==
Time Runner is a game in which the player goes around the edges of 20 rectangular boxes on a checkerboard playing area to claim one as territory.

== Reception ==
Dick McGrath in Computer Gaming World stated that "Time Runner may hold out some challenge to nimble-fingered whiz kids, but in my book it only rates about a 5 out of a possible 10 for arcade games". 80 Micro's Eric Maloney said that the TRS-80 version of the game was the best from Funsoft. He approved of its simple but challenging and non-violent gameplay suitable for children, albeit describing it as repetitive. Comparing it to "the old arcade flop" Amidar, R. J. Michaels of Ahoy! enjoyed Time Runner for Commodore 64 despite the "uninspiring" graphics and "familiar" gameplay.

== See also ==
- Kid Grid
