= Maze Craze =

1980 video game

Maze Craze: A Game of Cops n’ Robbers
- Box art by James Kelly
- Developer: Atari, Inc.
- Publishers: Atari, Inc.
- Designer: Rick Maurer
- Platform: Atari 2600
- Release: 1980
- Genre: Maze
- Modes: Single-player, multiplayer

Maze Craze: A Game of Cops n’ Robbers is a game for the Atari Video Computer System (later renamed the Atari 2600) developed by Rick Maurer and published by Atari, Inc. in 1980. In Maze Craze, two players compete to be the first to escape a randomly generated, top-down maze. Though primarily a two player game, any of the variations that don't involve interaction with the second player can be played solo. Sears rebranded Maze Craze as Maze Mania for its Tele-Games system.

== Gameplay ==
Two players in a randomly generated maze.

The manual describes the situation as a "maze of city blocks" and the player a red or blue cop on patrol. The cops are represented as squares. The goal is to reach the exit. In multiplayer games, the first player to find their way out wins. The maze is randomly generated for each game.

Some variants add robber blocks to the maze which either need to be avoided or captured, depending. Others make the maze either partially or fully invisible, and maze is periodically revealed for a moment or only when the joystick button is pressed. In the "Blockcade" variant, each player can drop a false wall to trick the other player. There are settings to increase or decrease the speed of the cops and robbers and the number of robbers in the maze.

== Development ==
Rick Maurer had been working on a clone of Space Invaders in 1978 for the Atari Video Computer System. After a few months of development, he had a playable version. The consumer division of Atari later instructed Maurer to cease further work on the game, which led to Maurer focusing on coding what would become Maze Craze (1980). Maurer reflected on developing the game, saying he believed it would help him hone his coding skills for the console.

== Release ==
Maze Craze was released for the Atari Video Computer System in 1980.

Maze Craze was re-released in various compilation formats. This includes the Atari 80 in One for Windows in 2003 and the Atari Anthology for PlayStation 2 and Xbox in 2004. In 2023, it was released as a free DLC for the Atari 50 (2022) compilation and as part of the pack-in compilation title with the release of the Atari 2600+. It was released on portable devices as part of the Atari Greatest Hits Volume 2 release for the Nintendo DS in 2011.

== See also ==
- The Amazing Maze Game (1976)
