= Trashman (video game) =

1984 video game

- Publisher: New Generation Software
- Designer: Malcolm Evans
- Platforms: ZX Spectrum, Commodore 64, Amstrad CPC
- Release: 1984
- Genre: Action
- Modes: Single-player, multiplayer

Trashman is a video game developed by Malcolm Evans for the ZX Spectrum and released by New Generation Software in 1984. It was ported to the Commodore 64 and Amstrad CPC.

A sequel,Travel with Trashman, was published later the same year. The third game in the series, Trashman Through Time, was never completed, however Trashman Goes Moonlighting was made for the Amstrad CPC although it may only have been distributed in Italy.

== Gameplay ==
There are seven levels each consisting of one street each named after streets in and around Bath, Somerset. The player starts at the bottom of the street and has to empty the bin from each house into the dustcart that moves slowly up the left lane of the road. The first level consists of five houses each with a bin to be emptied, the second level has six houses, and so on. Once all the bins are emptied, the player simply walks to the top of the street to complete the level.

ZX Spectrum version

Each level has a time limit, if the player fails to empty all the bins within this limit then the player has to repeat the level. If a level is played three times exceeding the time limit, the game is over. The player must avoid stepping onto grass, as doing so will cause the time counter to decrease very rapidly until they step off it. But if the player manages to empty a bin without stepping onto any grass, the householder appears at the door and invites the player in for a few seconds. This will increase the time limit, as well as providing a little humorous conversation, such as "Could you look at my TV?" - "I meant mend it, not watch it".

The biggest threat to the player is the passing traffic in the road: if the player is run over by a car the game ends immediately. Sometimes if the player steps onto the grass, a dog comes out of the house and tries to bite the player, making them limp for a minute or two. In later levels, pavement cyclists must be avoided as well.

== Reception ==
Reception

Review scores
Publication	Score
Crash	83%
Computer and Video Games	8/10 (average)
Personal Computer Games	8/10

The game received good reviews for its detailed graphics, good use of colours, and the use of bright and normal colours to create an effect of shadow.

The ZX Spectrum version reached the top of the UK video game charts in May 1984.
