= Taxman (video game) =

1981 video game

- Manual cover
- Publisher: H.A.L. Labs
- Programmer: Brian Fitzgerald
- Platform: Apple II
- Release: 1981
- Genre: Maze
- Modes: Single-player, multiplayer

Taxman is a clone of Namco's Pac-Man written by Brian Fitzgerald for the Apple II and published by H.A.L. Labs, a firm he cofounded with Greg Autry, in 1981 (no relation to the similarly named Japanese company).

Featuring the same maze and yellow Pac-Man character as the arcade game, and promoted as "the definitive version of the popular game," H.A.L. was asked to stop selling Taxman by Atari, Inc. who owned the home rights to Pac-Man. Atari published a modified version of Taxman as the official Apple II port of Pac-Man under its Atarisoft label. H.A.L. Labs then changed the mazes and some of the graphics of Taxman and rebranded it as Taxman 2 in 1982.

Fitzgerald gave permission to release the Taxman source code in 2015.

== Plot ==
Taxman is set in the land of Tanstaafl in which the rebellious citizens are rioting in the streets, and the player passes through tax centers located in each precinct to temporarily pacify the rebels.

== Reception ==
Karl Westerholm reviewed Taxman in The Space Gamer No. 56. Westerholm commented that "I definitely recommend this game to all who waste too many quarters at arcades, as it is just as addictive as the original."
