= Gobbler (video game) =

1981 video game

- Developer: Olaf Lubeck
- Publisher: On-Line Systems
- Platform: Apple II
- Release: NA: 1981
- Genre: Maze
- Mode: Single-player

Gobbler is a 1981 clone of Pac-Man for the Apple II, published by On-Line Systems (later to become Sierra Entertainment). It was programmed by Olaf Lubeck who also wrote Cannonball Blitz (1982) for the Apple II, a clone of Donkey Kong.

== Gameplay ==
The player uses the arrow keys to move the character left and right, and the A and Z keys to move up or down. Each dot is worth five points, while pieces of fruit (cherries, an apple and a lime) are each worth 200. Consuming the white pellets makes the four ghosts vulnerable for a short time, during which they are colored green and can be eaten (earning 200 points for the first, 400 for the second, etc.).

== See also ==
- Jawbreaker, another Pac-Man clone published by On-Line Systems
