= Malcolm Evans (computer programmer) =

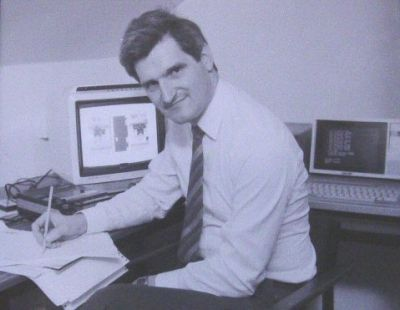
- Born: 10 April 1944 (age 82); Romford, London
- Education: Portsmouth Polytechnic
- Occupation: Computer game programmer
- Years active: 1981–1984
- Notable work: 3D Monster Maze; Trashman

Malcolm Evans (born 10 April 1944) is a British former computer game programmer and electronics technician, best known for his games 3D Monster Maze for the Sinclair ZX81 and Trashman for the ZX Spectrum, released in 1982 and 1984 respectively.

He and his twin brother, Rod, were born in Romford, but his family soon moved to Portsmouth. He has a B.Sc. in electronics from Portsmouth Polytechnic and joined Marconi, where he worked on high-powered projects, such as satellite technology. Then in the mid-1970s he moved to work for Smiths Aviation, where he designed hardware to implement computer control systems for jet engines.

In 1979 he moved again, to Sperry Gyroscope in Bristol, where he joined its micro-processor applications group. There he found himself using Zilog Z80 and Intel 8088 machine code language for small applications of a classified nature for the Ministry of Defence. The Bristol factory was closed in 1981 but by then Malcolm had received a ZX81 from his wife, Linda, for his thirty-seventh birthday in April 1981. Malcolm developed 3D Monster Maze to test what the computer was capable of, and completed it by November.

In the spring of 1982, Evans founded his own company, New Generation Software, which continued to produce games for the ZX Spectrum and pioneer the 3D gaming industry.

As of 2016 Evans was no longer writing games, but he is the author of a travelogue about New Zealand.
