= Manic Miner =

1983 video game

- Cassette inlay
- Publishers: Bug-Byte (August 1983); Software Projects (Nov 1983); Amsoft (1985)
- Designer: Matthew Smith
- Programmer: Matthew Smith (Spectrum)
- Platforms: ZX Spectrum, Amiga, Amstrad CPC, BBC Micro, Commodore 16, Commodore 64, Dragon 32/64, MSX, Oric, SAM Coupé, Tatung Einstein, MTX, PMD 85, Game Boy Advance, Xbox 360, Mobile
- Release: August 1983
- Genre: Platform
- Mode: Single-player

Manic Miner is a platform game written for the ZX Spectrum by Matthew Smith. It was published by Bug-Byte in 1983, then later the same year by Software Projects. The first game in the Miner Willy series, the design was inspired by Miner 2049er (1982) for the Atari 8-bit computers. Retro Gamer called Manic Miner one of the most influential platform games of all time, and it has been ported to numerous home computers, video game consoles, and mobile phones.

== Gameplay ==
The first room: "Central Cavern"

In each of the twenty caverns, each one screen in size, are several flashing objects, which the player must collect before Willy's oxygen supply runs out. Once the player has collected the objects in one cavern, they must then go to the now-flashing portal, which will take them to the next cavern. The player must avoid enemies, listed in the cassette inlay as "...Poisonous Pansies, Spiders, Slime, and worst of all, Manic Mining Robots..." which move along predefined paths at constant speeds. Willy can also be killed by falling too far, so players must time the precision of jumps and other movements to prevent such falls or collisions with the enemies. Extra lives are gained every 10,000 points, and the game ends when the player has no lives left. Above the final portal is a garden. To the right is a house with a white picket fence and red car parked in front. To the left is a slope leading to backyard with a pond and tree; a white animal, resembling a cat or mouse, watches the sun set behind the pond. Upon gaining his freedom, the game restarts from the first level with no increase in difficulty.

The in-game music is In the Hall of the Mountain King from Edvard Grieg's music to Henrik Ibsen's play Peer Gynt. The music that plays during the title screen is an arrangement of The Blue Danube.

== Development and release ==
Manic Miner was developed by Matthew Smith following a request for a Donkey Kong style arcade game from Alan Maton, Bug-Byte's despatch manager. It was Smith's second game for the publisher following Styx. Both games were among nine titles launched by Bug-Byte at The Computer Fair at Earls Court in June 1983. Initially Manic Miner had sixteen screens until Smith found a way to add four more, finally finishing the game in August 1983.

While Styx had been sold outright to Bug-Byte for £3000, Manic Miner was published under licence and Smith was able to cancel the licence later that year. On 28th November, Software Projects - a company formed by Smith, Maton and Liverpool businessman Tommy Barton - released their own version of Manic Miner. Minor alterations were made to the graphics, changing some enemies from Bug-Byte logos and changing others to Penrose triangles (Software Projects' logo). Bug-Byte were able to continue selling their version of the game over the Christmas period with the Software Projects release not becoming the most circulated version until early 1984.

== Ports ==
Animated loading screen

The game was officially ported to the Amiga, Amstrad CPC, BBC Micro, Commodore 16, Commodore 64, Dragon 32/64, Game Boy Advance, mobile phones. MSX, Oric 1, and SAM Coupé,

=== SAM Coupé ===
SAM Coupé version (1992)

The SAM Coupé version, programmed by Matthew Holt, like the ZX original requires pixel-perfect timing, and both graphics and audio, the latter by František Fuka, were greatly updated. In addition to the original twenty caverns, forty additional caverns were included in this release. Levels were designed by David Ledbury, and winners of a competition run by SAM Computers Ltd.

=== Dragon 32/64 ===
The Dragon 32 version, programmed by Roy Coates, has a cheat mode accessed by typing "P", "P", "ENGUIN". To retain the resolution of the original, the Dragon version has black and white graphics.

== Reception ==
Reception

Review score
Publication	Score
Computer and Video Games	9/10

Awards
Publication	Award
Crash	Crash Smash
Golden Joystick Awards	Best Arcade-Style Game of the Year 1983

In August 1983, sales of Bug-Byte's original ZX Spectrum release of Manic Miner took the game to the top of the UK video games charts replacing Jet Pac. The Commodore 64 version, released by Software Projects, reached the number one position in early 1984. It went on to become the best-selling Commodore 64 game and third best-selling ZX Spectrum game of 1984.

The SAM Coupé version scored 84% in Your Sinclair and 88% in Crash.

Manic Miner was the winner of "Best Arcade Style Game", and placed third in the "Game of the Year" category at the 1983 Golden Joystick Awards voted for by readers of Computer and Video Games magazine. Manic Miner was placed at number 25 in the "Your Sinclair official top 100" Spectrum games of all time and was later voted number 6 in the Readers' Top 100 Games of All Time.

In 1991, ACE magazine listed Manic Miner and its sequel Jet Set Willy, along with Hunchback, Impossible Mission, and the Mario series, as the greatest platform games of all time, calling Manic Miner "the first great home computer platform game".

The game was #97 on Polygon's 2017 retrospective list of the 500 best games of all time.

== Legacy ==
Unofficial ports exist for the Acorn Archimedes, Acorn Atom, Acorn Electron, Atari ST, Cambridge Z88, Commodore 128, HP48, Linux, Macintosh, Microsoft Windows, MS-DOS, Neo Geo Pocket Color, Nintendo 64, Orao, Playdate, PlayStation, PMD 85, TRS-80 Color Computer, VIC-20, Zune, and ZX81.

The sequel to Manic Miner is Jet Set Willy and was followed by Jet Set Willy II. Software Projects also released a game in the style of Manic Miner for the VIC-20 called The Perils of Willy.

Manic Miner 360 was released for the Xbox 360 as an Xbox Live Indie Game in June 2012. It was delisted alongside the Xbox Live Indie Games store in November 2017.

A homage to the Manic Miner loading screen appears in one episode of the 2005 British sitcom Nathan Barley.

== See also ==
- Roller Coaster
- Blagger
- Sir Lancelot
