= Miner Willy =

Video game series

Miner Willy is the protagonist in a series of platform games for the ZX Spectrum, MSX, Amstrad CPC and the Commodore 64 home computers. The first two games - Manic Miner and Jet Set Willy were written by Matthew Smith during the early 1980s.

The Willy saga was to be a trilogy and a third game in the series was planned, Miner Willy Meets The Taxman.

The series started in 1983 with the release of Manic Miner, and was followed up a year later with Jet Set Willy and Jet Set Willy II. Another game in the series, The Perils of Willy, was released solely for the VIC-20. Andre's Night Off was published as a type-in listing in the June 1984 issue of Computer & Video Games. In addition, quite a few unofficial sequels, remakes, homages and updates have been released.

== Games in the series ==
- Manic Miner (1983), Bug-Byte / Software Projects
- Jet Set Willy (1984), Software Projects
- The Perils of Willy (1984), Software Projects
- Andre's Night Off (1984), Matthew Smith
- Jet Set Willy II (1985), Software Projects
