= Chuckie Egg 2 =

1985 video game

- Developers: A&F Software
- Publishers: A&F Software; Pick & Choose
- Designers: Pete Waterfield; Sean Townsend; A&F R&D Team
- Platforms: ZX Spectrum, Commodore 64, Amstrad CPC, Atari ST, Amiga
- Release: 1985
- Genre: Action adventure
- Mode: Single-player

Chuckie Egg 2 is the sequel to 1983 video game Chuckie Egg. Released in 1985 and featuring the same lead character, Henhouse Harry, the game takes players beyond the single-screen format of the original into a large factory. Here, Harry has to assemble a toy-carrying chocolate egg from its constituent parts (sugar, milk and cocoa powder) and deliver it to the dispatch lorry. On completion the quest restarted, with more monsters and an alternative toy.

== Gameplay ==
The game features 120 screens arranged in 10x12 grid, beginning at the top of left. Some moving objects are fatal to touch, while others bounce Harry around the screen. The factory is divided into thematic sections. Milk is collected in an ice zone, cocoa in a purple zone in which most enemies are monkeys, sugar in an industrial blue zone and the toy in a brick zone that bears the most resemblance to the original game. The egg maker, which needs all ingredients and the toy to function, is located in a zone infamous for allowing Harry to fall to his death through the "slippery" pipes.

Several transitional zones exist between these task-centred areas, and due to the game's non-linear layout a number of these can be bypassed in any successful completion.

After delivery of the completed egg, the game restarts with additional monsters and a different toy to assemble. In order, these are: a motorbike, a vintage car, a yacht, a space shuttle.

Players receive points for moving to a new screen for the first time, as well as for picking up (by moving over them) various objects including fruit, tools and eggs. The scoring received for these objects is inconsistent both between screens and each time the game is played.

== Development ==
Nigel Alderton, the author of the original Chuckie Egg, had been working on a Mr. Do!-style follow-up that never came to fruition. With Alderton's move to Ocean Software, A&F took development in a different direction.

To aid in their publicity, A&F organised a Chuckie Egg 2 competition, pitting contestants against each other in regional heats and a national final. Crash, a gaming magazine popular at the time, was tasked with adjudication. Prizes included silver and gold egglets and up to £500 cash. The winner of this contest is unknown.

== Release and ports ==
Chuckie Egg 2 was originally released on cassette by A&F Software for the Amstrad CPC, ZX Spectrum and the Commodore 64 priced at GBP£6.90.

It was later bundled on Virgin Games' Now Games 2 compilation along with Airwolf, Cauldron, Tir Na Nog and World Cup Football.

It was released for the Amiga and the Atari ST in 1988.

== Reception ==
Reviews at the time of its release were lukewarm.

In its issue 24 "Lookback at 1985", Crash magazine wrote:

A & F were also back with a follow up trying to recapture the enigmatic success of Chuckie Egg with the appropriately named Chuckie Egg 2. In addictive terms it wasn't a patch on the first game, but it did offer numerous platform leaping locations and plenty of adventure elements to keep fans happy for some hours.

This was despite rating the game at 81%, one percent higher than the original Chuckie Egg.

Sinclair User issue 39 stated:

There is little or nothing original about the program, which relies heavily on all the old conventions of the genre, although to be fair A&F can lay some claim to having established a few of those conventions themselves. The graphics are lurid and not of the best detail, but have that special Chuckie Egg quality all the same. An improvement is the abolition of the requirement to complete each screen before proceeding further. That is no longer necessary, and the resulting maze of exits and entrances to different screens is one of the more complex we have seen.

CPC Zone concludes:

While Chuckie Egg 2 is not quite as gripping nor as addictive as the first game it is worth checking out if you are a JSW [Jet Set Willy] fan.
