= Dragon MSX =

Home computer prototype

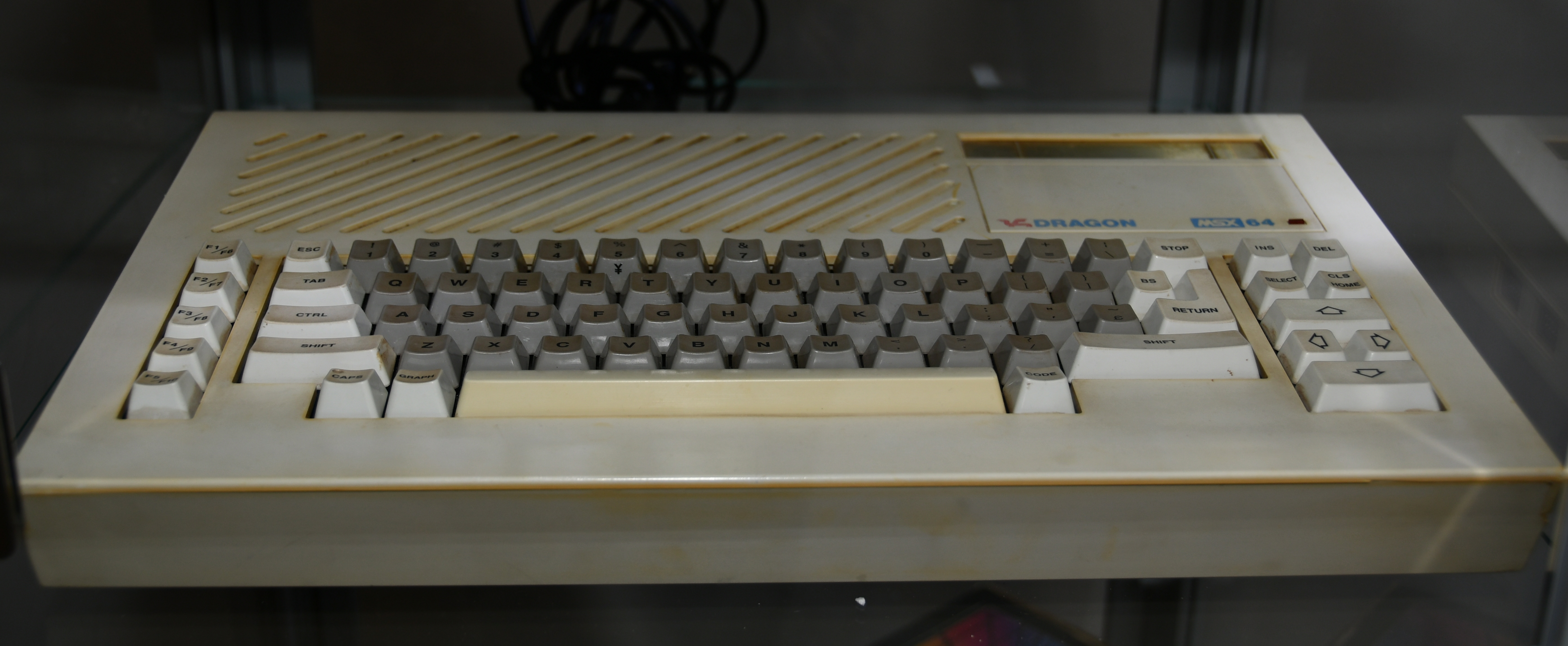
- Dragon MSX
- Developer: Radofin
- Manufacturer: Dragon Data / Eurohard
- Type: home computer
- Released: 1985 (unreleased prototype)
- Operating system: MSX BASIC V1.0
- CPU: Zilog Z80A @ 3.58 MHz
- Memory: 64 KB
- Sound: AY-3-8910 (PSG)
- Backward compatibility: MSX

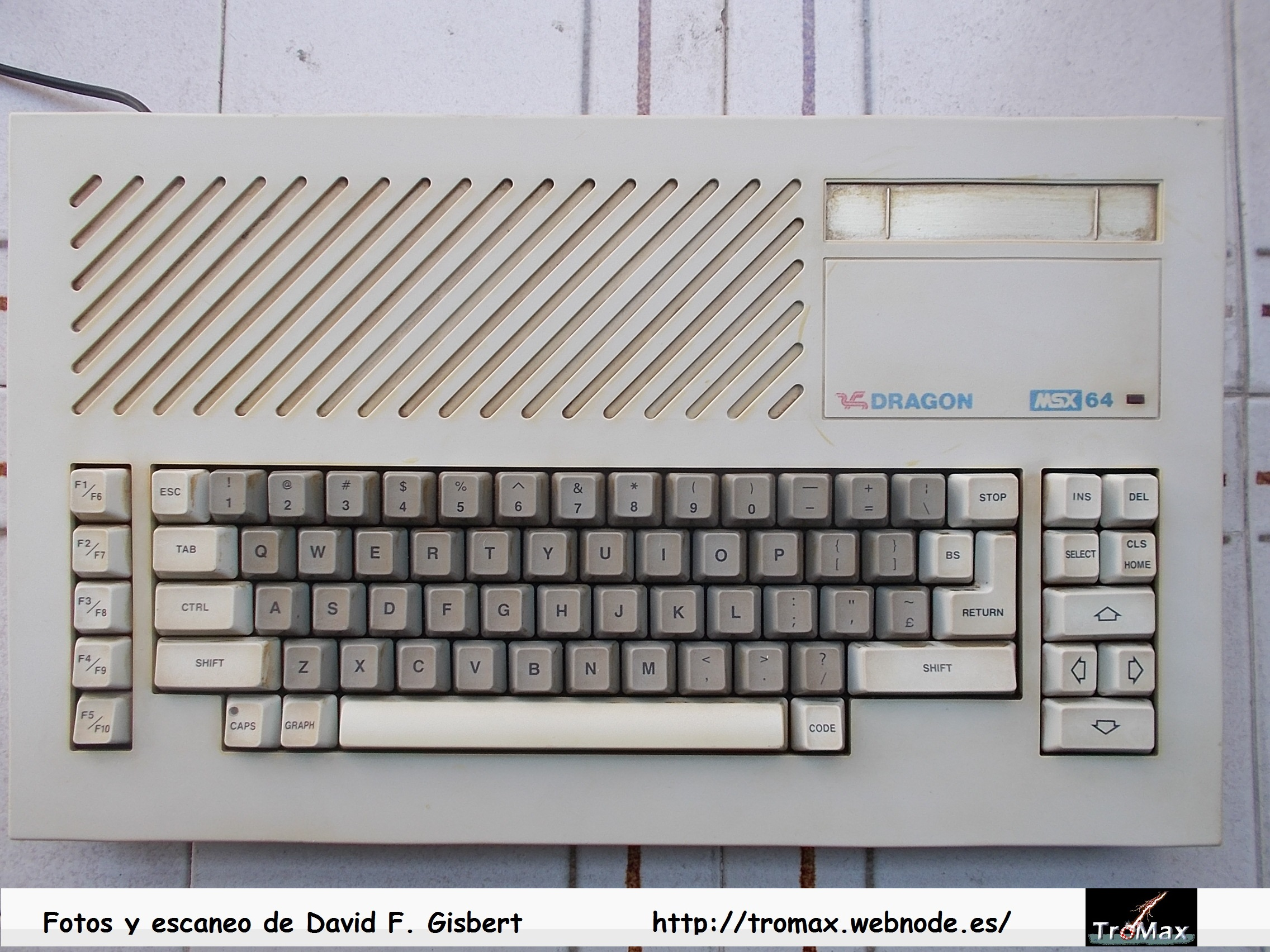
Dragon MSX (prototype 37)

The Dragon MSX is a MSX compatible home computer, designed in 1985 by Radofin (the creators of the Mattel Aquarius) for Dragon Data/Eurohard, the makers of the Dragon 64 home computer.

Intended for the Spanish market it was never officially released, with a few prototypes being built.

One of these (prototype 37) was presented at MadriSX 2001 by David F. Gisbert "TroMax", a spanish collector. No other machines are known.

== Specifications ==
The Dragon MSX has the following technical details:

- ROM: 32 KB
- RAM: 64 KB
- Video Display Processor: TMS9918 with a Video RAM of 16 KB and this BASIC modes :
  - SCREEN 0 : text 40 × 24 characters, 2 colors
  - SCREEN 1 : text 32 × 24 characters, 16 colors
  - SCREEN 2 : graphics 256 × 192, 16 colors
  - SCREEN 3 : graphics 64 × 48, 16 colors
  - Sprites: 32, 1 colour, max 4 per horizontal line
- Ports: parallel port, two cartridge slots, two joystick ports, RF output, RGB output and Data Recorder connector
- Operating system: MSX BASIC V1.0
