= Styx (Spectrum video game) =

1983 video game

- Developer: Matthew Smith
- Publisher: Bug-Byte
- Platform: ZX Spectrum
- Release: EU: 1983
- Genres: Maze, shoot 'em up
- Mode: Single-player

Styx is a shoot 'em up maze video game published by Bug-Byte Software in 1983. It was the first ZX Spectrum game written by Matthew Smith, and the first of his three-game contract with the company. He went on to write Manic Miner in the same year.

== Gameplay ==
The screen is split into three sections: a brick maze, an underwater section and a final confrontation with the Grim Reaper. The first maze section is similar to Wizard of Wor and enemy spiders regenerate when shot until the generator-a larger spider-is destroyed. In the aquatic section enemy fish reappear from the screen edge when shot. In the final stage the Grim Reaper sends energy bolts that ricochet around the screen. These can be destroyed and the Grim Reaper will not regenerate them. Shooting the Grim Reaper ends the level. The game then begins again with an increase in generated monsters.

The player is armed with a laser that only shoots horizontally, although it can destroy several enemies with one shot. When hit enemies fade out and can still kill the player until they have completely disappeared.

== Reception ==
Sinclair User described the game as "reasonably lively", while CRASH said the game "would not be interesting if it weren't for the fact that it's not easy."
