= Dragon 32/64 =

Home computer model

Dragon 32; Dragon 64
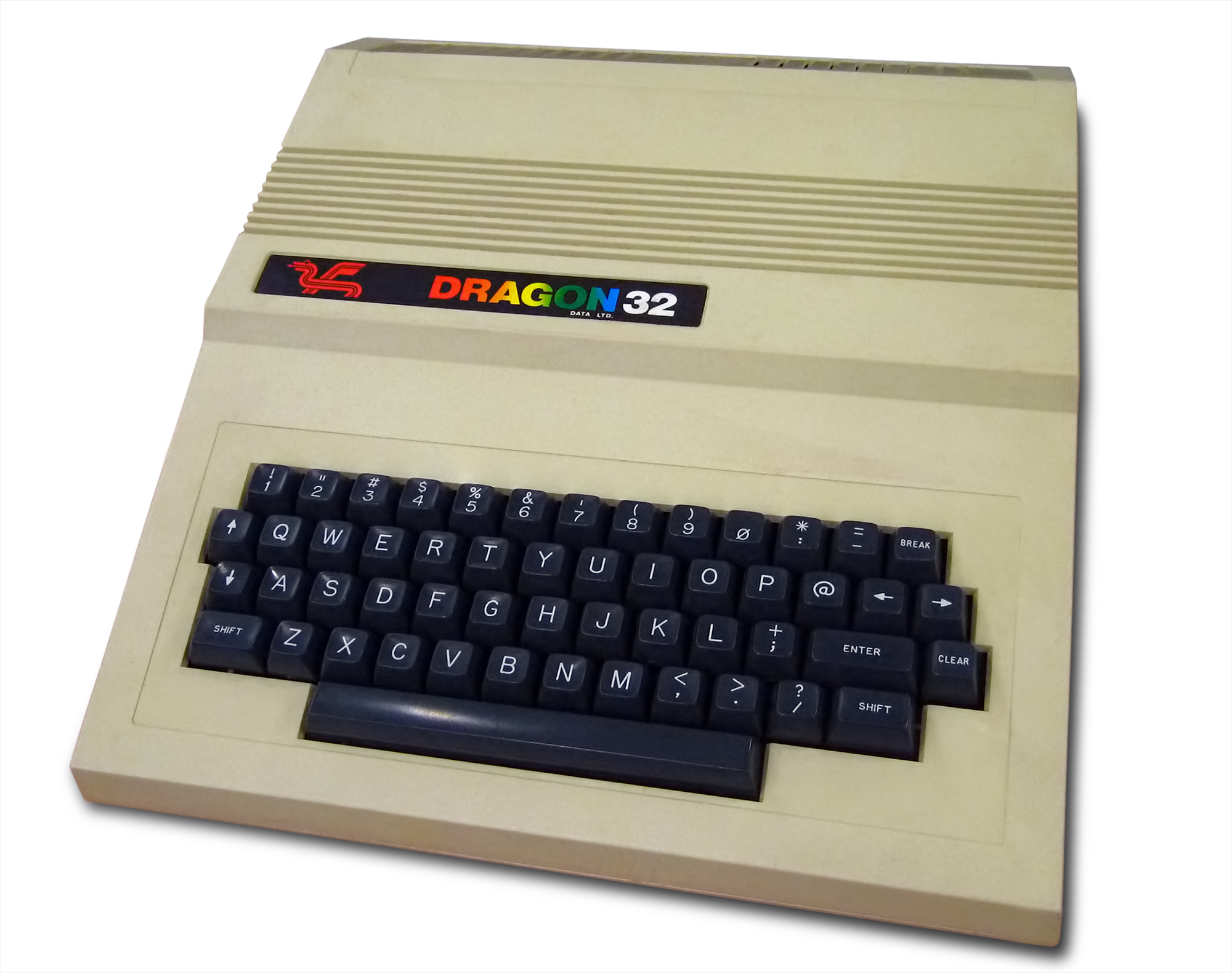
- A Dragon 32 home computer
- Also known as: Dragon 200, Dragon 200-E
- Manufacturer: Dragon Data
- Type: Home computer
- Released: August 1982; 44 years ago
- Discontinued: 1987; 39 years ago
- Operating system: Microsoft Extended BASIC
- CPU: Motorola 6809E @ 0.89 MHz
- Memory: 32 KB/64 KB
- Display: Composite monitor or TV over RF output, 64×48 with 8 colours semigraphics, 128×192 with 4 colours, 256×192 with 2 colours
- Graphics: MC6847 Video Display Generator
- Sound: 1-bit sound

The Dragon 32 and Dragon 64 are 8-bit home computers that were built in the 1980s. The Dragons are very similar to the TRS-80 Color Computer, and were produced for the European market by Dragon Data, Ltd., initially in Swansea, Wales, before moving to Port Talbot, Wales (until 1984), and by Eurohard S.A. in Casar de Cáceres, Spain (from 1984 to 1987), and for the US market by Tano Corporation of New Orleans, Louisiana. The model numbers reflect the primary difference between the two machines, which have 32 and 64 kilobytes of RAM, respectively.

Dragon Data introduced the Dragon 32 microcomputer in August 1982, followed by the Dragon 64 a year later. Despite initial success, the Dragon faced technical limitations in graphics capabilities and hardware-supported text modes, which restricted its appeal in the gaming and educational markets. Dragon Data collapsed in 1984 and was acquired by Spanish company Eurohard S.A. However, Eurohard filed for bankruptcy in 1987.

The Dragon computers were built around the Motorola MC6809E processor and featured a composite monitor port, allowing connection to (at the time) modern TVs. They used analog joysticks and had a range of peripherals and add-ons available. The Dragon had several high-resolution display modes, but limited graphics capabilities compared to other home computers of the time.

The Dragon came with a Microsoft BASIC interpreter in ROM, which allowed instant system start-up. The Dragon 32/64 was capable of running multiple disk operating systems, and a range of popular games were ported to the system.

Overall, the Dragon computers were initially well-received but faced limitations that hindered their long-term success.

== Dragon 32 vs. Dragon 64 ==
Aside from the amount of RAM, the Dragon 64 also has a functional RS-232 serial port which was not included on the Dragon 32. A minor difference between the two Dragon models is the outer case colour; the Dragon 32 is beige and the Dragon 64 is light grey. Besides the case, branding and the Dragon 64's serial port, the two machines look the same. The Dragon 32 is upgradable to Dragon 64. In some cases, buyers of the Dragon 32 found that they actually received a Dragon 64 unit.

== Product history ==
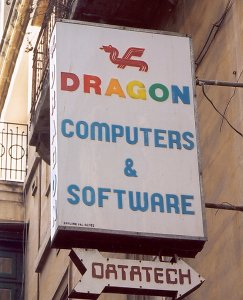
Dragon logo

Dragon Data entered the market in August 1982 with the Dragon 32. The Dragon 64 followed a year later. The computers sold well initially and attracted the interest of independent software developers including Microdeal. A companion magazine, Dragon User, began publication shortly after the microcomputer's launch.

Despite this initial success, there were two technical impediments to the Dragon's acceptance. The graphics capabilities trailed behind other computers such as the ZX Spectrum and BBC Micro, a significant shortcoming for the games market. Additionally, as a cost-cutting measure, the hardware-supported text modes only included upper case characters; this restricted the system's appeal to the educational market.

Dragon Data collapsed in June 1984. It was acquired by the Spanish company Eurohard S.A., which moved the factory from Wales to Cáceres and released the Dragon 200 (a Dragon 64 with a new case that allowed a monitor to be placed on top) and the Dragon 200-E (an enhanced Dragon 200 with both upper and lower case characters and a Spanish keyboard), but ultimately filed for bankruptcy in 1987. The remaining stock from Eurohard was purchased by a Spanish electronics hobbyist magazine and given away to those who paid for a three-year subscription, until 1992.

In the United States it was possible to purchase the Tano Dragon new in box until early 2017 from California Digital, a retailer that purchased the remaining stock.

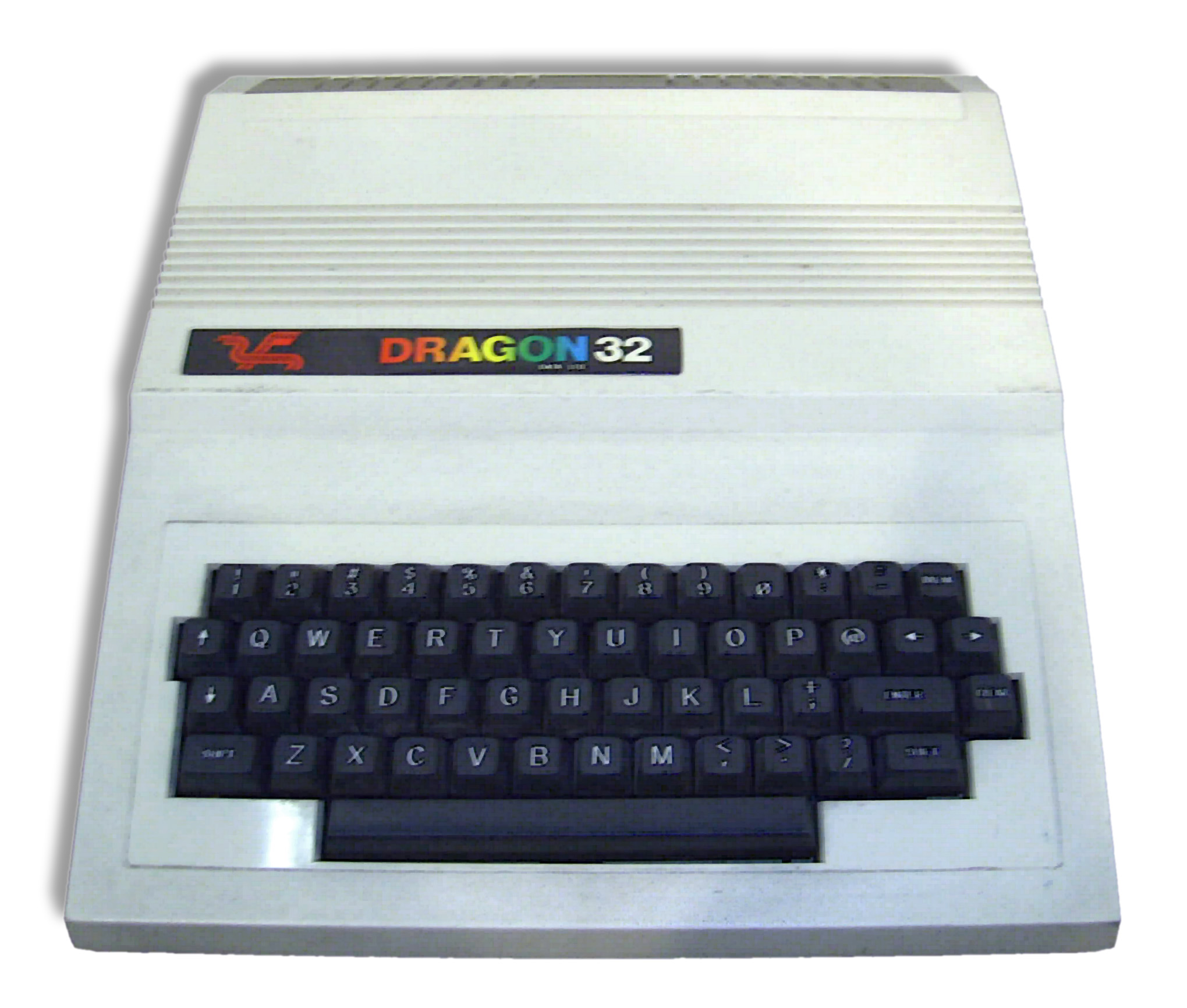
Dragon 32 front view

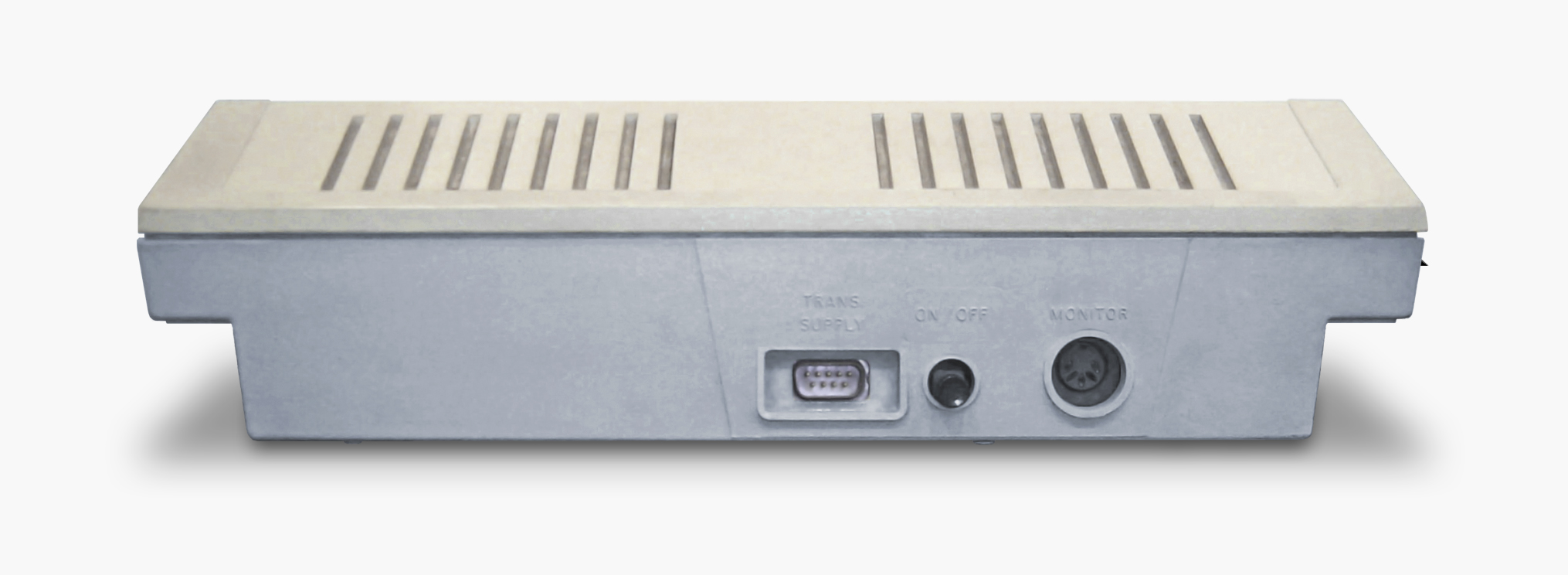
Dragon 32 back view

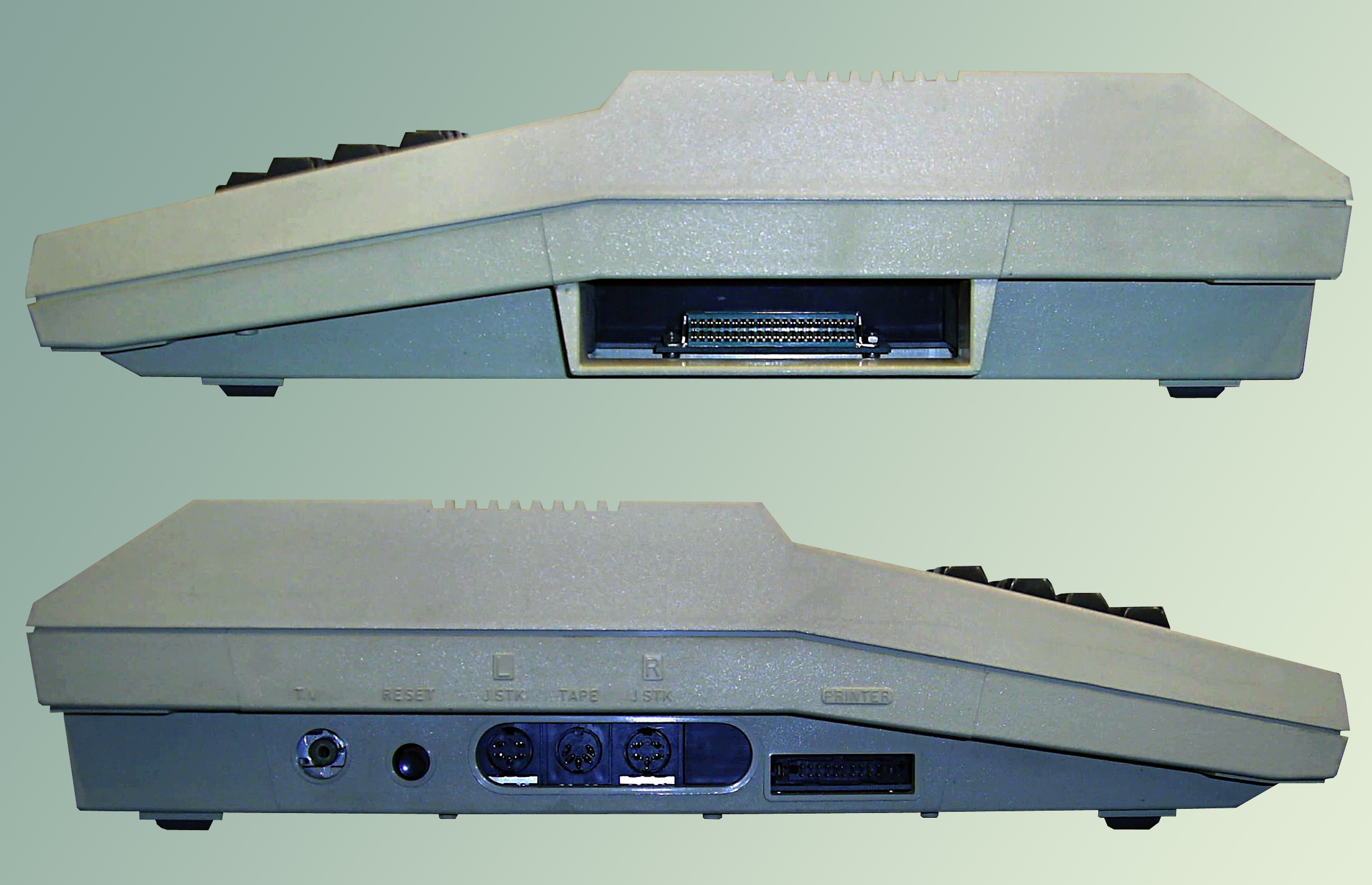
Dragon 32 side views

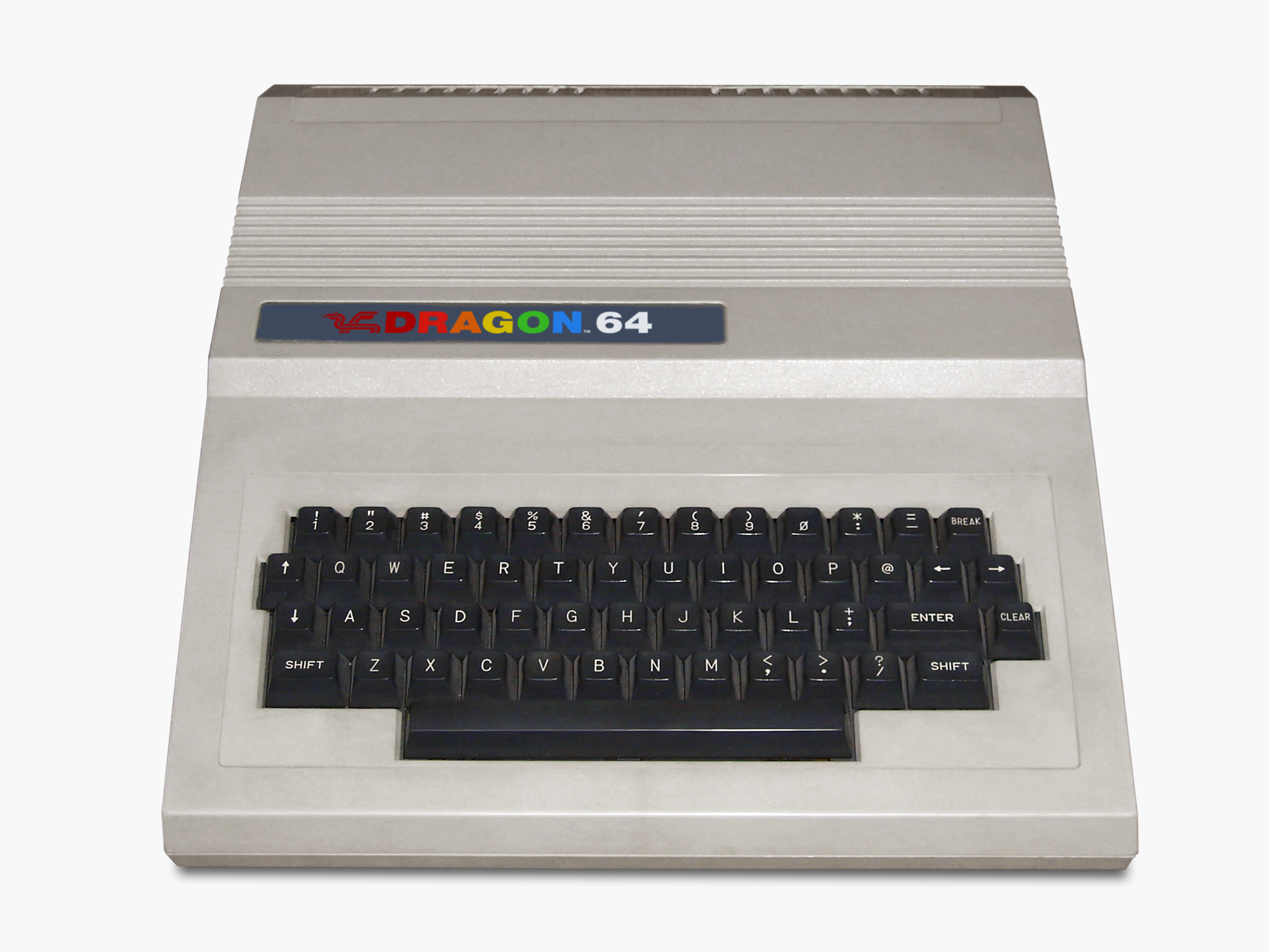
Dragon 64 top view

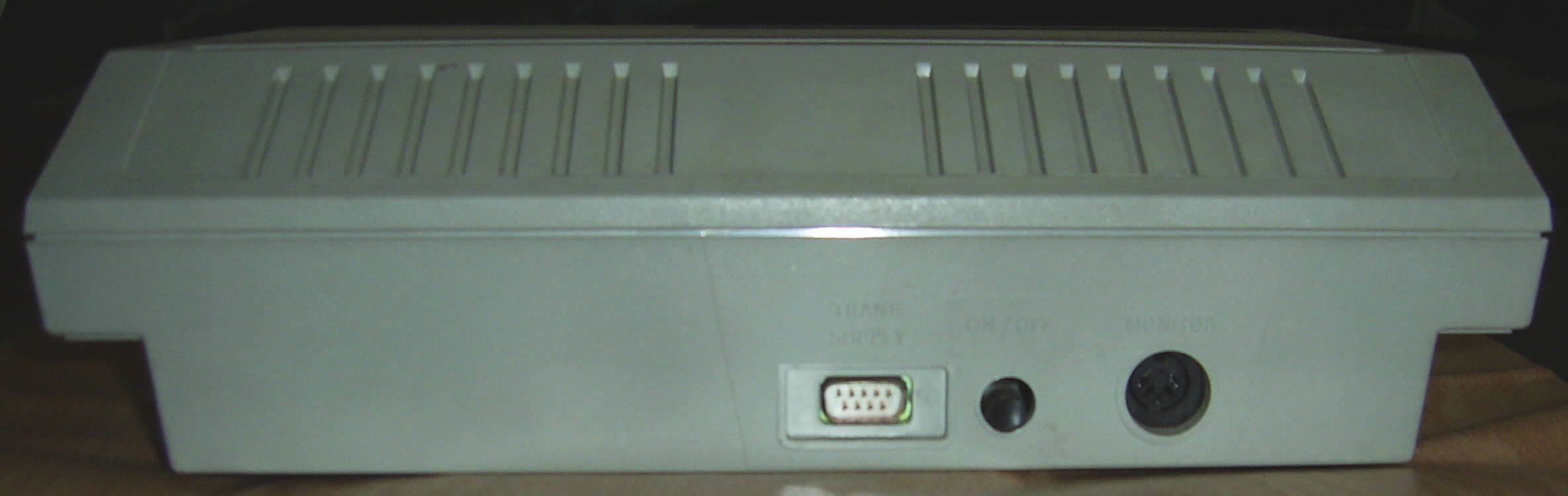
Dragon 64 back view

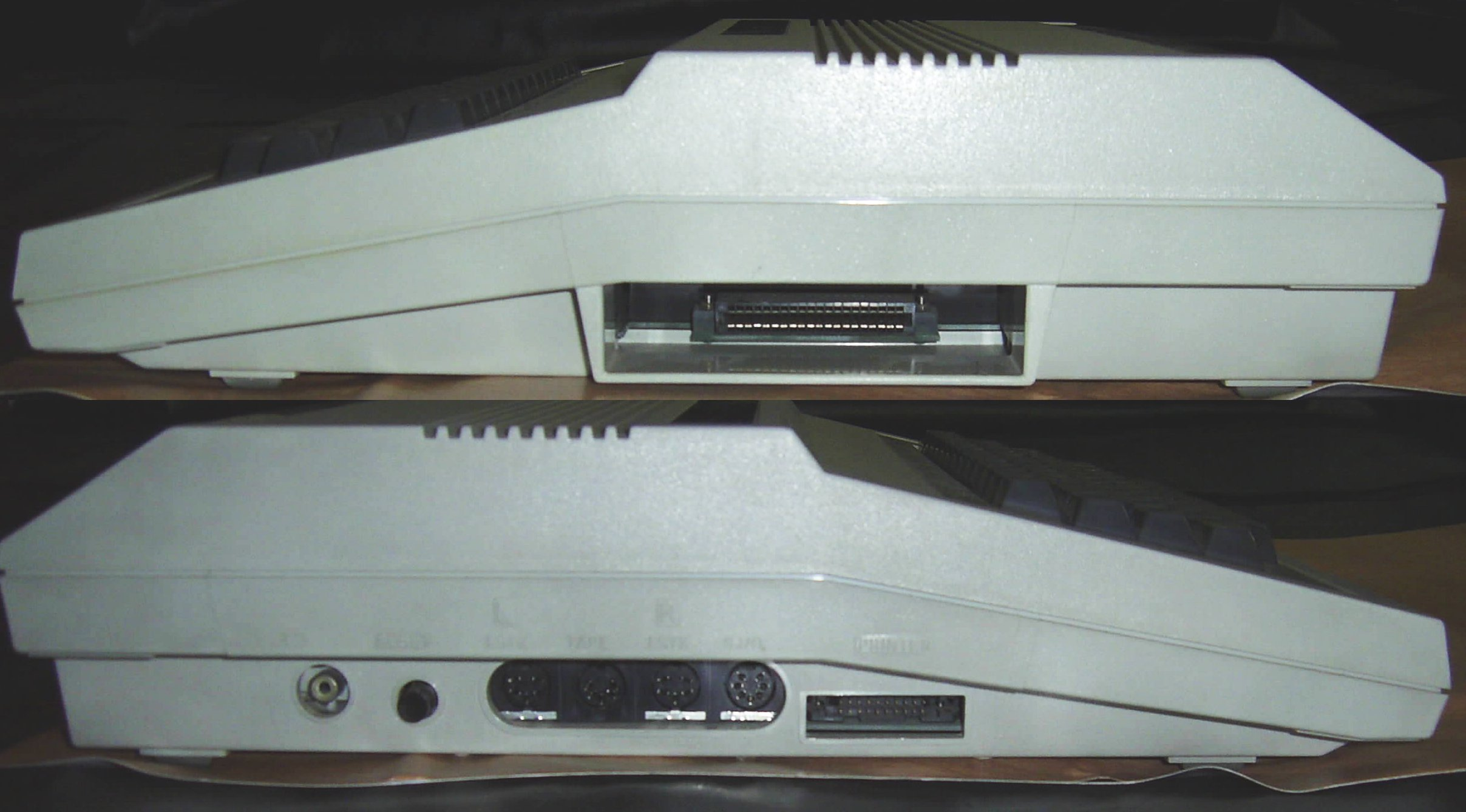
Dragon 64 side views

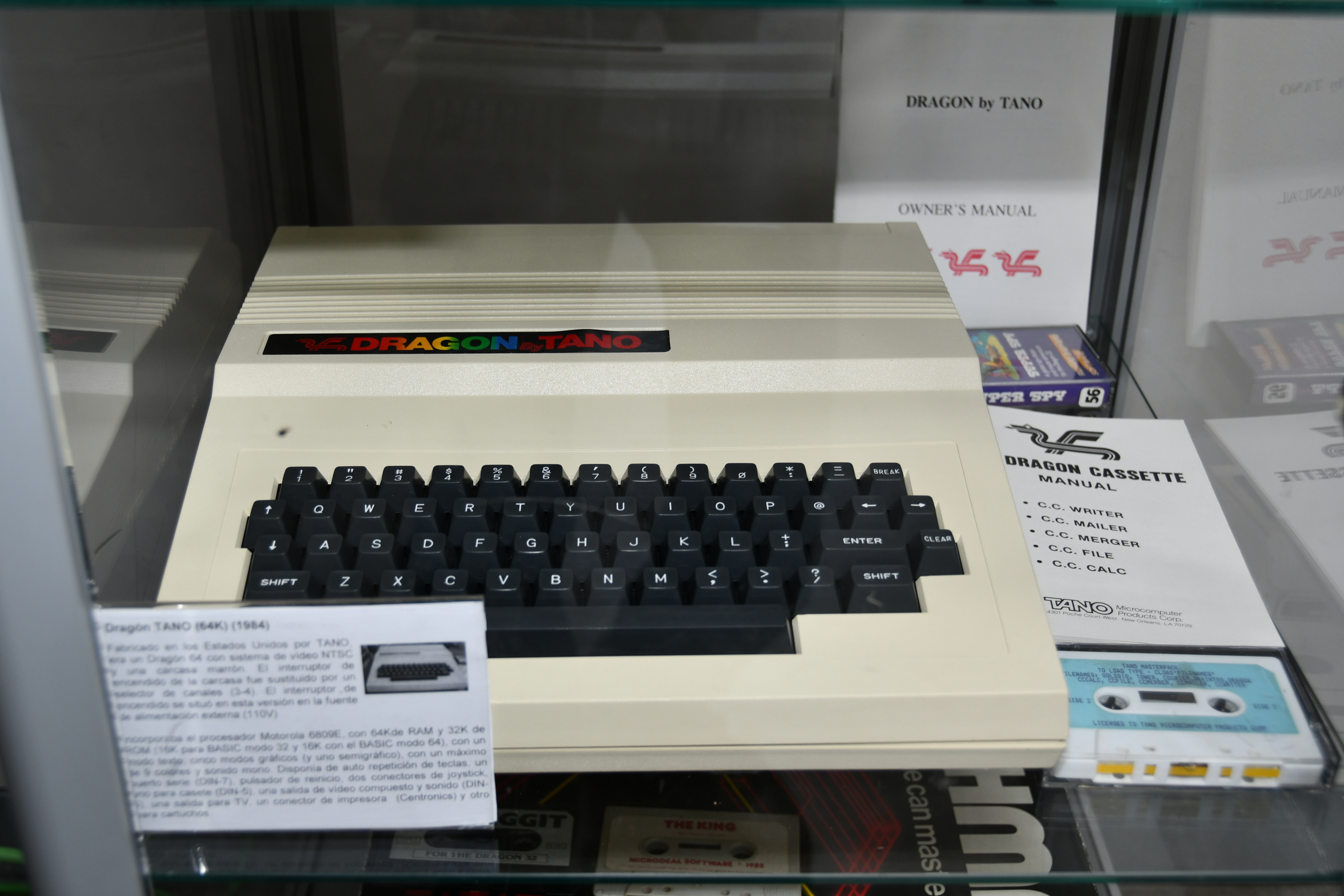
Dragon by Tano

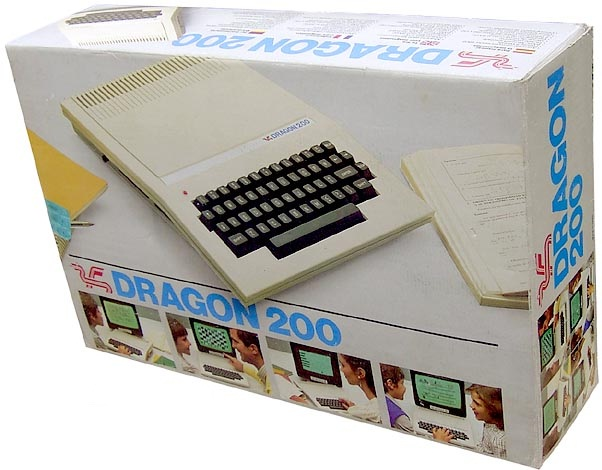
Dragon 200 box

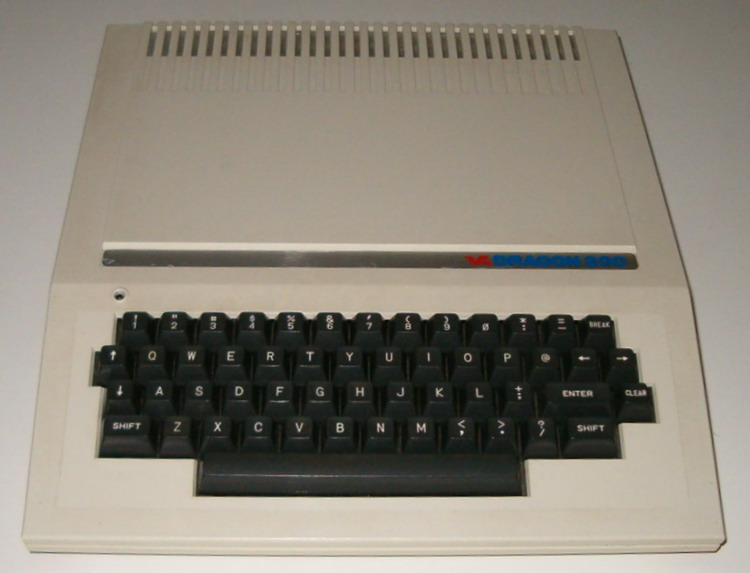
Dragon 200 top view

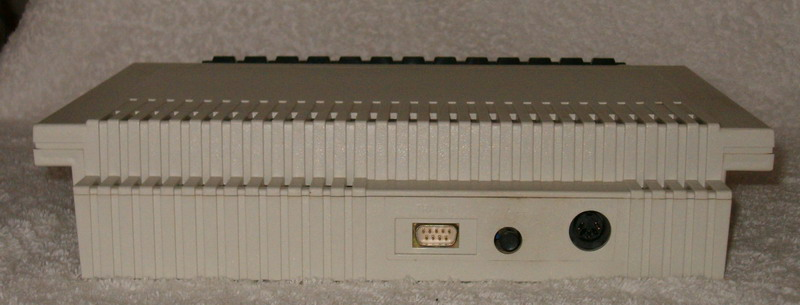
Dragon 200 back view

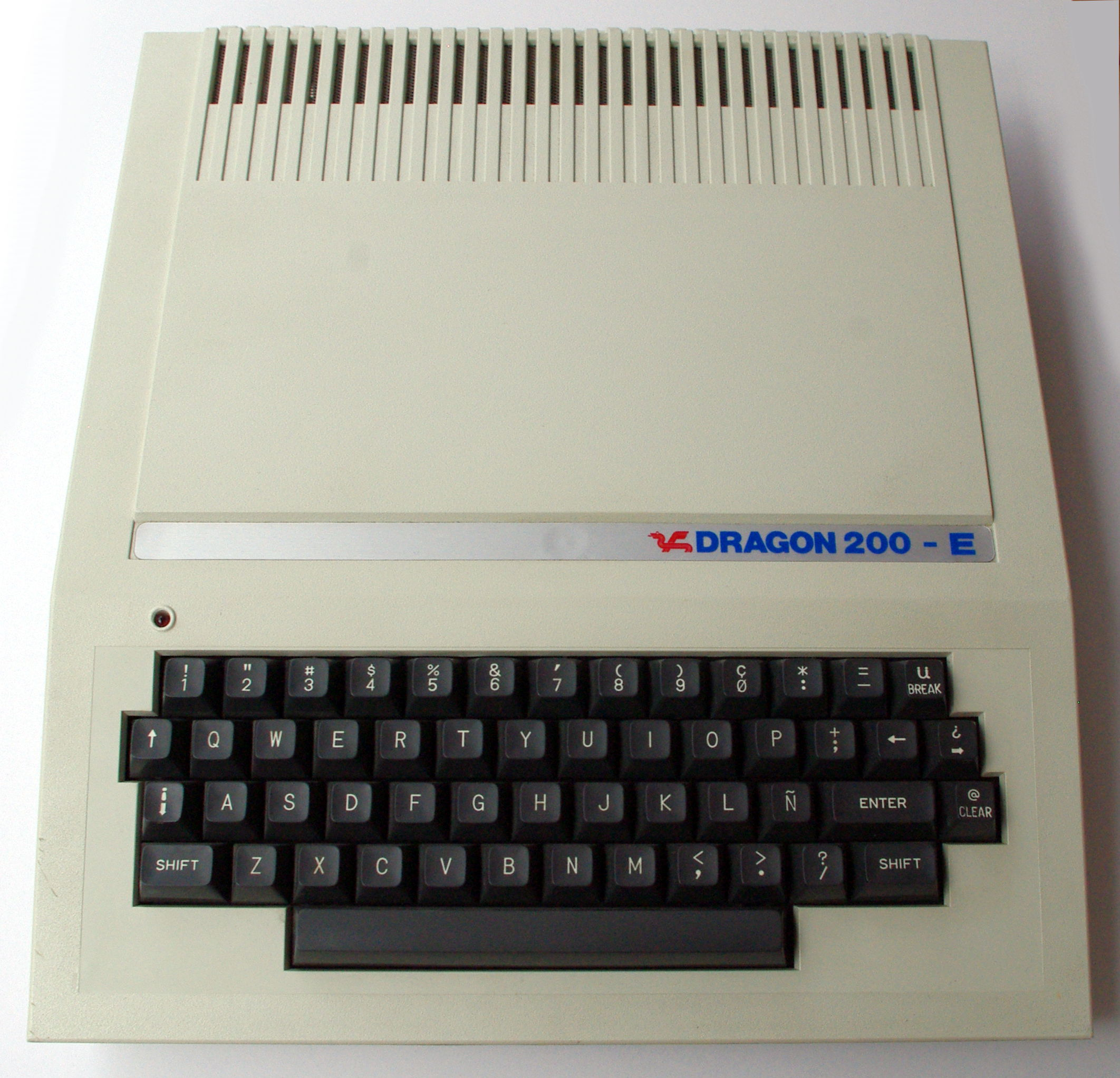
Dragon 200-E top view

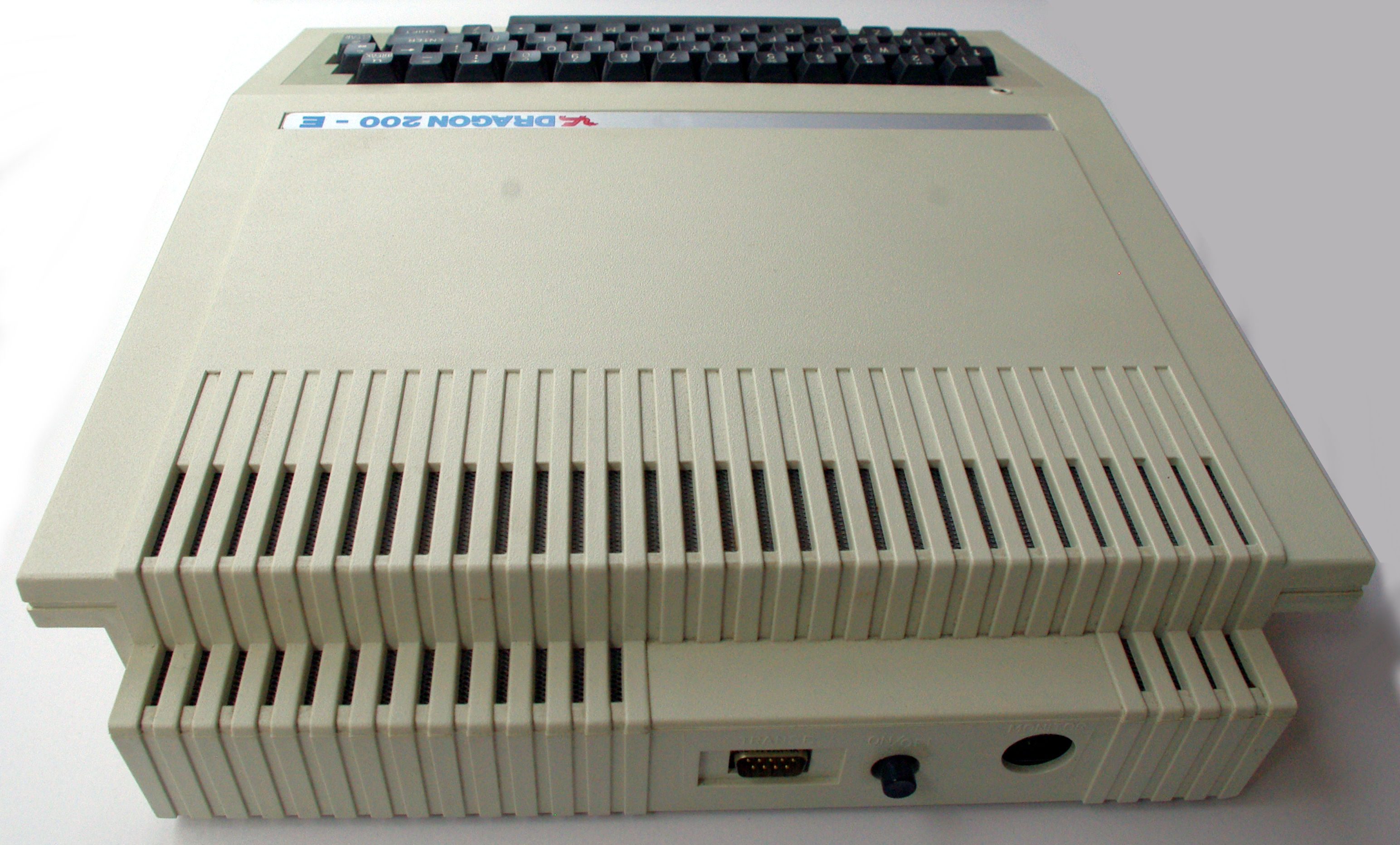
Dragon 200-E back view

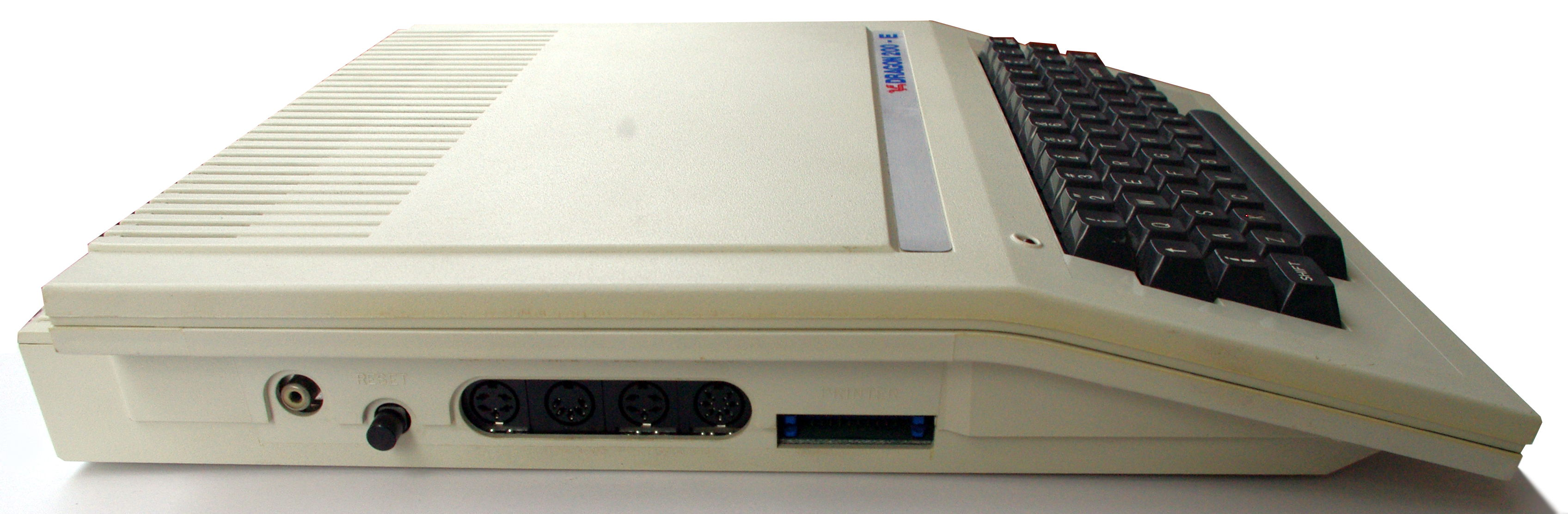
Dragon 200-E left side view

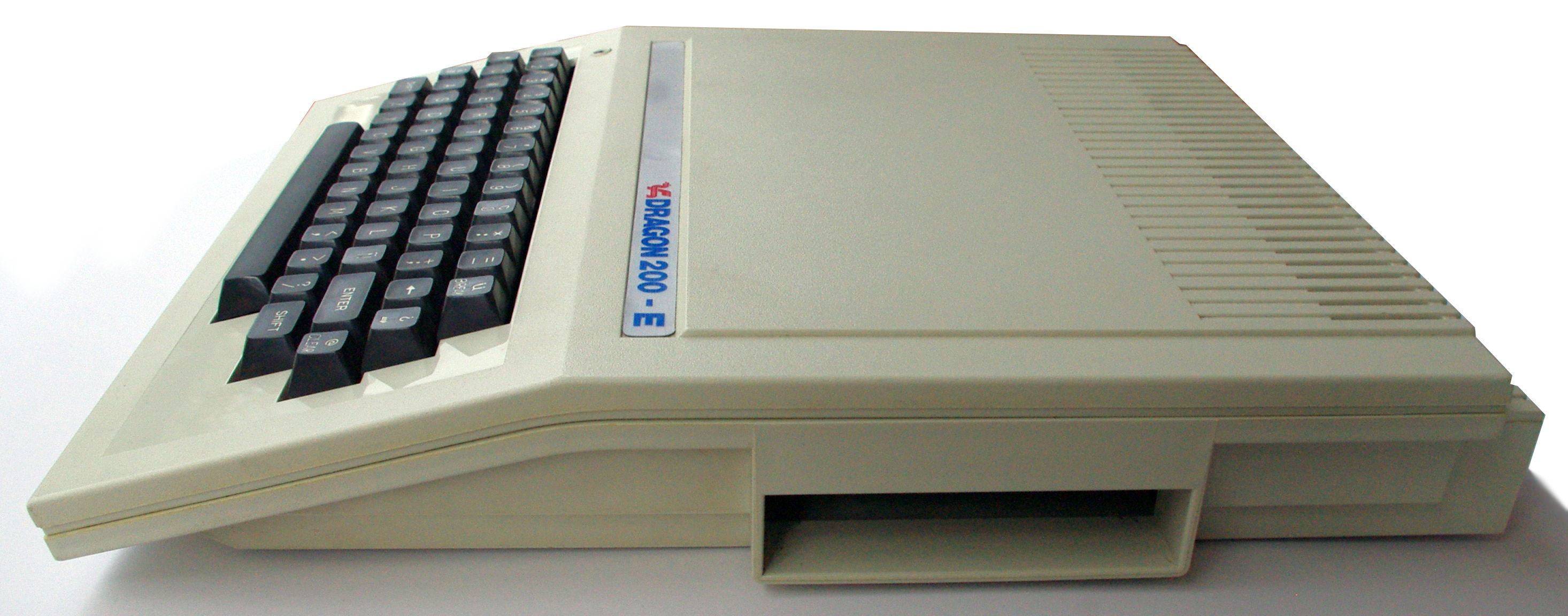
Dragon 200-E right side view

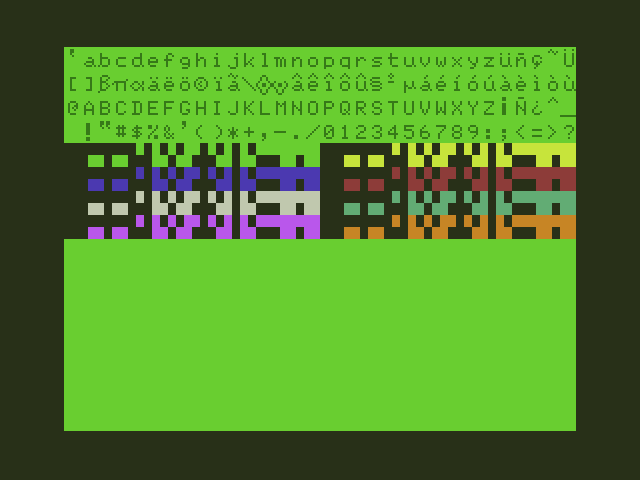
Dragon 200-E upper and lower case Spanish character set

== Reception ==
BYTE wrote in January 1983 that the Dragon 32 "offers more feature for the money than most of its competitors", but "there's nothing exceptional about it". The review described it as a redesigned, less-expensive Color Computer with 32K RAM and better keyboard.

== Technical notes ==
=== Hardware and peripherals ===
The Dragon is built around the Motorola MC6809E processor running at 0.89 MHz. It was an advanced 8-bit CPU design, with limited 16-bit capabilities.

It was possible to increase the speed of the computer by using POKE 65495,0 which accelerated the ROM-resident BASIC interpreter, but temporarily disabled proper functioning of the cassette/printer ports. Manufacturing variances mean that not all Dragons were able to function at this higher speed, and use of this POKE could cause some units to crash or be unstable, though with no permanent damage. POKE 65494,0 returned the speed to normal. POKE 65497,0 pushed the speed yet higher but the display was lost until a slower speed was restored.

The Dragon used the SN74LS783/MC6883 Synchronous Address Multiplexer (SAM) and the MC6847 Video Display Generator (VDG). I/O was provided by two MC6821 Peripheral Interface Adapters (PIAs). Many Dragon 32s were upgraded by their owners to 64 KB of memory. A few were further expanded to 128 KB, 256 KB, or 512 KB with home-built memory controllers/memory management units (MMUs).

A broad range of peripherals exist for the Dragon 32/64, and there are add-ons such as the Dragon's Claw which give the Dragons a port that is hardware-compatible with the BBC Micro's user port, though separate software drivers for connected devices must be developed. Although neither machine has a built-in disk operating system (Compact Cassettes being the standard storage mechanism commonly used for machines of the time), DragonDOS was supplied as part of the disk controller interface from Dragon Data Ltd. The versatile external ports, including the standard RS-232 on the 64, also allows hobbyists to attach a diverse range of equipment.

The computer featured a composite monitor port as an alternative to the TV RF output which can be used to connect the Dragon 32 to most modern TVs to deliver a much better picture.

The Dragon used analogue joysticks, unlike most systems of the time which used simpler and cheaper digital systems. Other uses for the joystick ports included light pens.

Tony Clarke and Richard Wadman established the specifications for the Dragon.

The units had a robust motherboard in a spacious case, reminiscent of the BBC Micro, and so were more tolerant of aftermarket modification than some of their contemporaries, which often had their components crammed into the smallest possible space.

=== Video modes ===
The Dragon's main display mode is 'black on green' text (the black was, in actuality, a deeper, muddier green). The only graphics possible in this mode are quarter-tile block based.

It also has a selection of five high-resolution modes, named PMODEs 0–4, which alternate monochrome and four-colour in successively higher resolutions, culminating in the black-and-white 256×192 PMODE 4. Each mode has two possible colour palettes – these are rather garish and cause the system to fare poorly in visual comparisons with other home computers of the time. It is also impossible to use standard printing commands to print text in the graphical modes, causing software development difficulties.

Full-colour, scanline-based 64×192 semi-graphics modes are also possible, though their imbalanced resolution and programming difficulty (not being accessible via BASIC) meant they were not often utilised.

=== Disk systems ===
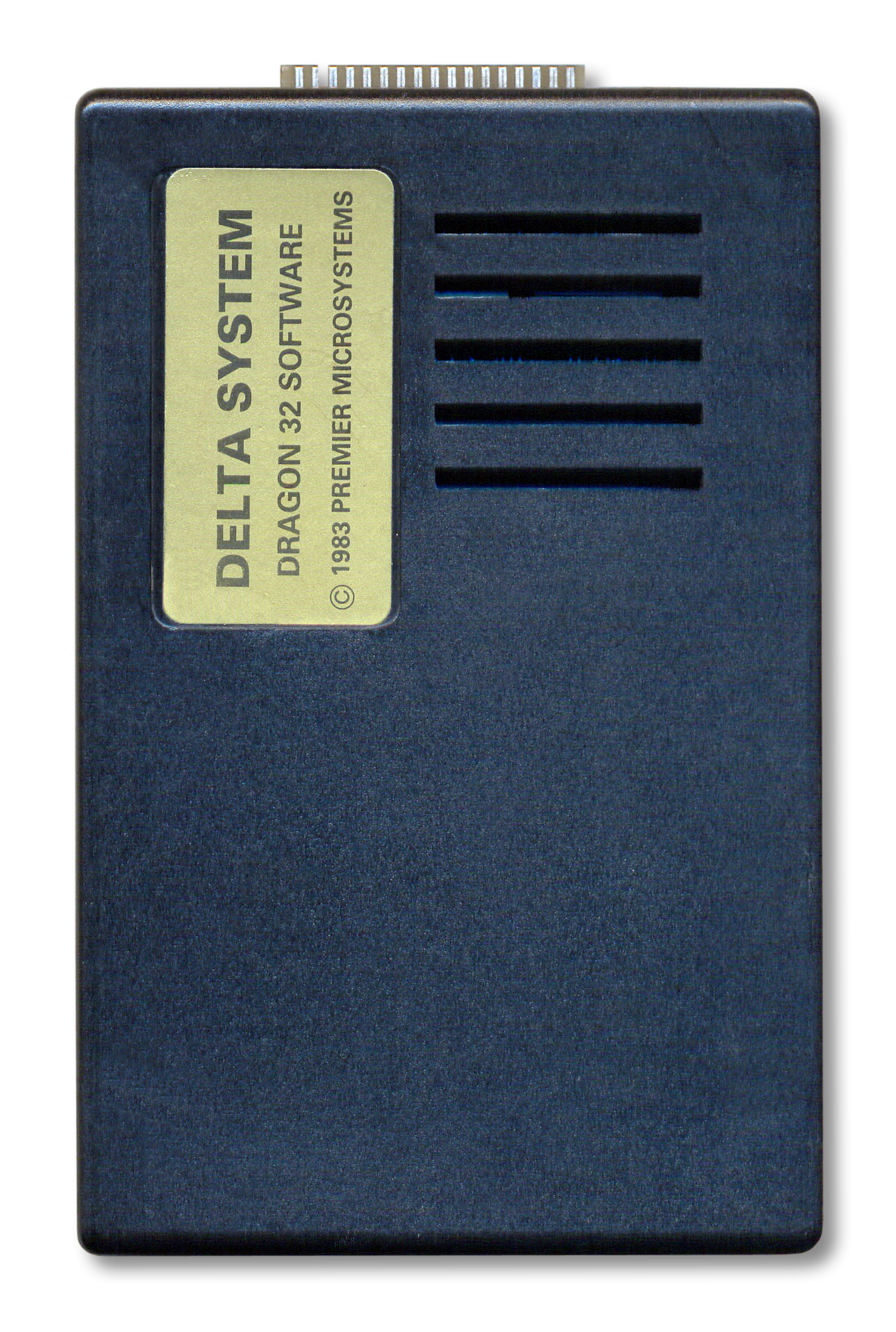
Delta DOS Interface

First to market was a complete disk operating system produced by Premier Microsystems, located near Croydon. The system was sold as the "Delta" disk operating system; there was a proposal for Dragon to market this as an addon. Dragon did not enter into such an agreement and instead produced the DragonDOS system. The two systems were incompatible.

Delta's lead in availability ensured that software was released in the format, whilst Dragon's "official" status ensured that it, too, gained software published in its format. This led to confusion and frustration, with customers finding they had either purchased a version incompatible with their setup, or that the software was only available for the competing standard.

=== System software ===
The Dragon comes with a Microsoft BASIC interpreter in 16 KB of ROM. The BASIC appears to be nearly identical to Tandy Color Computer's Extended Basic with a few changes necessary to interact with the Dragon system.

In common with home computers of the time, the entire operating software was included on a ROM chip; therefore, the system starts instantly when powered up.

Some software providers also produced compilers for BASIC and other languages to produce binary (or "machine") code which would run many times faster and make better use of the small system RAM. Towards the end of its life, Dragon Data produced an assembler/disassembler/editor suite called Dream.

In addition to the DragonDOS disk operating system, the Dragon 32/64 is capable of running several others, including FLEX, and even OS-9 which brought UNIX-like multitasking to the platform. Memory-expanded and MMU-equipped Dragons are able to run OS-9 Level 2.

Dragon Data leveraged OS-9 to deliver a suite of office applications on disk for the Dragon 64: the Stylograph word processor, DynaCalc spreadsheet, and Record Management System database. A further four business packages known as the Bookkeeper Series were also announced.

== Games ==
Manic Miner (Software Projects) had to run in black and white.

Initially, the Dragon was reasonably well supported by the major UK software companies, with versions of popular games from other systems being ported to the Dragon. Top-selling games available for the Dragon include Arcadia (Imagine), Chuckie Egg (A&F), Manic Miner and sequel Jet Set Willy (Software Projects), Hunchback (Ocean) and Football Manager (Addictive). There were also companies that concentrated on the Dragon, such as Microdeal. Their character Cuthbert appeared in several games, with Cuthbert Goes Walkabout also being converted for Atari 8-bit and Commodore 64 systems.

Due to the limited graphics modes of the Dragon, converted games had a distinctive appearance, with colour games being usually played on a green or white background (rather than the more common black on other systems) or games with high-definition graphics having to run in black and white.

When the system was discontinued, support from software companies also effectively ended. However, Microdeal continued supporting the Dragon until January 1988. Some of their final games developed for the Dragon in 1987 such as Tanglewood and Airball were also converted for 16-bit machines such as the Atari ST and Amiga.

There are 798 commercial games for the Dragon 32.

Name	Year	Publisher
3D Lunattack	1984	Hewson Consultants
3-D Maze		Apex Trading
3D Seiddab Attack	1984	Hewson Consultants
3D Space Wars	1984	Hewson Consultants
5 Games Tape		Datacom Publications
6809 Express	1985	Quickbeam Software
747 Flight Simulator	1984	DACC Ltd
A Contar		Eurohard
A Week At The Races	1983	B & H Software
Ace In The H.O.L.E.		Kayde Software
Acolyte		Dragonfire Services
Action Pack		Shards Software
Adventure Plus		Premier Microsystems
Adventure Trilogy		Dragon Data
Adventureland		Adventure International
After The Fire		Channel 8 Software
Aggressor		Programmers Guild
Air Assault	1984	Datacom Publications
Air Sea Missile		Twig Systems Software
Air Traffic Control	1983	Microdeal
Airball		Microdeal
Albert And The Monsters		Algray
Alcatraz II	1982	Microdeal
Alien Blitz	1982	Gem Software
Alien Oddessy Parts 1 & 2		Bamby Software
Aliens+		Wizard Software
All Systems Go		Anik Microsystems
Amazing		Bamby Software
And All Because	1983	B & H Software
Android Invaders	1984	Lyversoft
Anikman		Anik Microsystems
Antigravity		Dragonfire Services
Apples		Computerware
Aquanaut 471		Microdeal
Arcade Action (Meteor Run / Breakout)		Apex Trading
Arcadia	1984	Imagine
Arcane Quest		Kayde Software
Area Radar Controller		Software For All
Arrow Of Death Part 1	1983	Channel 8 Software
Arrow Of Death Part 2	1983	Channel 8 Software
Astroblast	1982	Dragon Data
Athletyx	1985	Microdeal
Atlantis		Qed Systems
Atom Hunt		Active Software
Attack	1982	PSS
Autorun		Datacom Publications
Avenger	1983	Voyager Software
A-Z Chase / Money Bags	1982	Apex Trading
Baby Dragon (Koko/Teddy)	1983	Gravesend Home Computers
Baccarat	1983	Cable Software
Back Track	1984	Incentive Software
Backgammon (Microdeal)	1983	Microdeal
Backgammon (Oasis)		Oasis Software
Bagitman		Aardvark-80
Bandito		Pocket Money Software
Barmy Burgers	1984	Blaby Computer Games
Basil Goes Ballooning	1984	Sir Basil Spice Software
Battle Stations		Anik Microsystems
Bc Bill		Imagine
Beam Rider	1984	Microdeal
Bean Patch		Orange Software
Beanpatch		Microvision
Beanstalker		Microvision
Berserk		Dragon Data
Best Of Pcw - Software For The Dragon		Century Software
Beyond The Cimeeon Moon		Dragon Data
Beyond The Infinite		Channel 8 Software
Big Six		Audiogenic
Black Sanctum		Dragon Data
Blackjack / Jackpot	1983	B & H Software
Bloc Head		Dragon Data
Blockbuster Quiz		Computerware
Blockbuster Quiz II		Computerware
Bombs Away Basil	1984	Blaby Computer Games
Bonka	1983	J. Morrison (Micros)
Bopswizzle		Bamby Software
Boris The Bold	1984	Blaby Computer Games
Boulder Crash	1984	Blaby Computer Games
Breakout / Middle Kingdom		Dragon Data
Bridge Master		Dragon Data
Brocks Kingdom		Blaby Computer Games
Bubble Buster	1984	Microdeal/Pocket Money Software
Bug Diver	1984	Mastertronic
Bugged!		Dungeon Software
Bumpers	1984	Dragon Data
Bust-Out!		Dragonfire Services
Buzzard Bait		Microdeal / Tom Mix
California Gold Rush		Anik Microsystems
Calixto Island		Dragon Data
Cambridge		Twig Systems Software
Cashman		Microdeal
Cassette 50	1983	Cascade
Castle Adventure		Virgin
Castle Blackstar	1984	CDS Micro Systems
Castle of Doom	1986	Giant Byte
Cat 'N' Mouse / Space Maze		Diand Software
Catacomb Crisis		Microvision
Catacombs		Premier Microsystems
Cave Fighter	1983	Cable Software
Cave Hunter		Dragon Data
Caverns Of Chaos	1984	Blaby Computer Games
Caverns Of Doom		Microdeal
CC Poker	1983	Compusense
Cells & Serpents		Asp Software
Cesil Interpreter		Wizard Software
Chambers	1984	Microdeal
Champions!		Peaksoft
Championship Darts	1984	Shadow Software
Chateau	1983	Gem Software
Chess		J. Morrison (Micros)
Children from Space		Dragon Data
Chuckie Egg	1985	A & F Software
Cimeon Moon		Dragon Data
Circus		Channel 8 Software
Circus Adventure		Dragon Data
City Defence		Shards Software
Clowns		Wizard Software
Colossal Cave (Compusense)		Compusense
Computa Fruita		Wizard Software
Confuzion	1985	Incentive Software
Connect 4		Computerware
Conquering Everest	1983	Asp Software
Convoy Attack		Romik Software
Copta Snatch	1984	Blaby Computer Games
Copter Patrol		J. Morrison (Micros)
Cores 64	1984	Microdeal
Cosmic Clones		Dragon Data
Cosmic Cruiser	1984	Imagine
Cosmic Crusader	1984	Blaby Computer Games
Cosmic Zap	1983	Microdeal
Courier Pilot		Programmers Guild
Cranky		Dragon Data
Crash	1984	Microdeal
Crazi Plumber		Wizard Software
Crazy Foota		Computape
Crazy Foota 2		Computape
Crazy Foota 3	1988	Orange Software
Crazy Painter		Microdeal
Creepies / To Boldly Go		Blaby Computer Games
Cribbage		Premier Microsystems
Cruising on Broadway	1983	Sunshine
Crusader		J. Morrison (Micros)
C-Trek		Compusense
CU*BER	1984	Tom Mix Software
Curse of Carmac		PSE Computers
Curse of Comarc	1986	Microvision
Cuthbert And The Golden Chalice	1986	Microdeal
Cuthbert Goes Digging	1983	Microdeal
Cuthbert Goes Walkabout		Microdeal
Cuthbert In Space		Microdeal
Cuthbert In The Cooler	1985	Microdeal
Cuthbert In The Jungle	1983	Microdeal
Cuthbert In The Mines	1983	Microdeal
Cyclops		Romik Software
Cyrus Chess		Dragon Data
DAMS	1988	Orange Software
Danger Island	1984	Software For All
Danger Ranger	1983	Microdeal
Danger!		PSE Computers
Dark Star		Design Design
Darts		Computerware
Data Fall		Microdeal/Pocket Money Software
Dataplan	1982	PSS
Deadwood (Early Green Inlay)		A & F Software
Death Cruise		Virgin
Death Mines Of Sirus	1983	Phoenix Software
Death'S Head Hole		Peaksoft
Decathlon (Dragonfire)		Dragonfire Services
Decathlon (Wizard Software)		Wizard Software
Defense		Microdeal
Demolition Derby	1984	Microdeal
Demon Knight		Asp Software
Demon Seed		Microdeal
Desert Golf		Compusense
Desperado Dan		Blaby Computer Games
Destiny Trilogy	1987	Pulser Software
Detective		Asp Software
Detonate / The Alien		Blaby Computer Games
Devil Assault	1983	Microdeal
Devils Island	1983	Apex Trading
Devils Triangle		Abacus
Diamond Dash		Starship Software
Diamond Dash 2		Starship Software
Diamond Manor		Dragonfire Services
Dickie Space Man		Quickbeam Software
Dickie'S Den	1985	Quickbeam Software
Dismon		Wizard Software
Dodo	1983	Preston (R & AJ)
Dominoes (Oasis)		Oasis Software
Donkey King	1982	Microdeal
Don'T Panic		Peaksoft
Dont Squeal		Dragonfire Services
Doodle Bug		Dragon Data/Microdeal/Computerware
Doom		PSE Computers
Downland	1984	Microdeal
Draconian	1984	Microdeal
Dragbug	1982	PSS
Dragon 1	1983	Dream Software
Dragon 2		J. Morrison (Micros)
Dragon 3D O'S & X'S / Invader Cube		Oasis Software
Dragon 4	1983	J. Morrison (Micros)
Dragon 55		Nemesis
Dragon Birthday Special		Dragon Data
Dragon Challenge		Premier Microsystems
Dragon Charset		Asn Computers Ltd
Dragon Chess		Oasis Software
Dragon Darts	1984	Blaby Computer Games
Dragon Double (Switchback, Alphasquare)		Mr Micro
Dragon Games 1 (Othello, Breakout, Awari, Lander, Raffles)		J. Morrison (Micros)
Dragon Games Pack		Program Direct
Dragon Games Tape 2		J. Morrison (Micros)
Dragon Games Tape 4 (Pteradactyl / Torpedo / Hornets)		J. Morrison (Micros)
Dragon Hawk	1983	Microdeal
Dragon Invaders	1982	Microdeal
Dragon Mountain		Dragon Data
Dragon Othello		Asn Computers Ltd
Dragon Personal Pack		Premier Microsystems
Dragon Racer / Wasp Invasion	1983	Cable Software
Dragon Selection 1		Dragon Data
Dragon Selection 2		Dragon Data
Dragon Selection 3		Dragon Data
Dragon Selection 4		Dragon Data
Dragon Selection 5		Dragon Data
Dragon Startrek		Wizard Software
Dragon Strategy Pack		Premier Microsystems
Dragon Tower		Premier Microsystems
Dragon Trek	1983	Wintersoft Software
Dragonfly		Hewson Consultants
Dragonfly II		Hewson Consultants
Dragopoly (Free Parking)		B & H Software
Dragrunner	1983	Cable Software
Dragstone		Dragonfire Services
Drawcaster - Australian Pools	1984	Acepak Software
Drawcaster - British Pools	1984	Acepak Software
Dream Machine		Dragonfire Services
Droids		J. Morrison (Micros)
Drone Datatank	1983	Cable Software
Dungeon Destiny		Microvision
Dungeon Raid		Microdeal
Dungeons Of Death		Premier Microsystems
Eager Edna		Cable Software
Earth Rescue		Abacus
Eddie Steady Go!	1985	Incentive Software
Eight Ball	1984	Microdeal
El Bandito		Dragon Data
El Diablero		Dragon Data
Election Fever		Whitsoft
Electron		Tom Mix Software
El-Pea	1986	Microvision
Empire	1983	Shards Software
Encoder 09	1983	Premier Microsystems
Endless Noughts And Crosses		R&P International
Enter The Dragon		Melbourne House
Escape		Microdeal
Escape Form Pulsar 7		Channel 8 Software
Escuela de pilotos F1	1982	Salamander Software
Everest	1983	Salamander Software
Evictor		Wizard Software
Execution		Datacom Publications
Exploring Adventures On The Dragon		Ducksoft
Fairground Fantasy		Abrasco Ltd
Fantasy Fight		Cable Software
Fearless Freddy		Microdeal/Pocket Money Software
Feasibility Experiment		Channel 8 Software
Fembots' Revenge		Dragon Data
Filmaster	1985	Microdeal
Final Countdown		Dragon Data
Fingers		Blaby Computer Games
Fire Force		Quickbeam Software
Fireball		Abacus
Fish Van Scandal	1989	Orange Software
Fishy Business		Salamander Software
Flag		Dragon Data
Flight		Dragon Data
Flight Simulator		PSS
Flipper		Microdeal
Folly Farm's Chicken Run	1984	Impsoft
Football Manager		Addictive Games
Forbidden City		Apex Trading
Forest Of Doom		Orange Software
Formula One		Pamcomms
Frankie		Quickbeam Software
Franklin In Wonderland		Salamander Software
Franklin's Tomb		Salamander Software
Free Parking		Active Software
Frogger	1983	Microdeal
Froggy		Galactic Software
Frog-Hop		Bamby Software
Froglet		CRL
Fruit Machine		Blaby Computer Games
Fruity		Dragon Data
Fun and Games		Shards Software
Fury		Microdeal
Galactic Ambush	1983	Microdeal
Galactic Gus		Quickbeam Software
Galactic Raiders		Algray
Galactic Slugs		Bamby Software
Galactic Taipan		Hornet Software
Galacticans	1984	Softek
Galagon		Microdeal
Galax Attax		Dragon Data
Gallactic Survival Pak		Anik Microsystems
Galleons		Wizard Software
Game Of Life (For Dasm)		Compusense
Games Compendium		Salamander Software
Games Pack 1 (Abacus)		Abacus
Games Pack 1 (Oasis)		Oasis Software
Games Pack 2		Abacus
Games Pack 3		Abacus
Games Pack I	1982	Gem Software
Games Pack II		Gem Software
Games Pack III		Gem Software
Games Pack IV (Sea Harrier / Sub Chase)		Gem Software
Games Tape 1 (Active Software)		Active Software
Games Tape 1 (B & H Software)		B & H Software
Games Tape 2 (Active Software)		Active Software
Games Tape 2 (Space Attack / Caterpillar)		Apex Trading
Gee Up Neddy		Anik Microsystems
Ghost Attack		Dragon Data
Ghost Town		Adventure International
Giants Castle	1983	Dungeon Software
Gis A Job		Blaby Computer Games
Glaxxons		Microdeal
Goblin Caves		Apex Trading
Golden Apples Of The Sun	1983	Bamby Software
Golden Oldies II		Pamcomms
Golden Voyage		Adventure International
Golf (Apex Trading)		Apex Trading
Golf (Audiogenic)		Audiogenic
Golf (Gem Software)		Gem Software
Golf (Microdeal)	1983	Microdeal / Tom Mix
Golf (PSS)		PSS
Golf (Salamander Software)	1983	Salamander Software
Gordon Bennet	1985	Computape
Grabber		Microdeal
Grand Prix		Salamander Software
Gridrunner		Salamander Software
Guardian		Hornet Software
Guardian Angel		Blaby Computer Games
Halcon (ES)		Cibercomp SA
Handicap Golf		CRL
Hang It!		Peaksoft
Hareraiser (Finale)		Haresoft
Hareraiser (Prelude)		Haresoft
Hide & Seek		Dragon Data
Hole		Dragonfire Services
Home Base		Cable Software
Hooked!		Shards Software
Horace Goes Skiing		Melbourne House
Horror Atoll		Kayde Software
Horror Castle	1983	A & F Software
Hotel On Mayfair		Datacom Publications
Hubert		Blaby Computer Games
Hunchback		Ocean Software
Hungry Horace		Melbourne House
I Ching		Virgin
Ice Castles		Spectral Associates
If I Had A Million		Phoenix Software
Impossiball		Pulser Software
Impossiball!		Dragonfire Services
Indoor Football		Quickbeam Software
Inform	1984	Premier Microsystems
Inspector Clueseau		Eurosoft
Intelligent Disk Copier		Dragonfire Services
Intergalatic Force	1983	Microdeal
Interplanetary Trader		Bamby Software
Invader / Simon		Apex Trading
Invaders		Alligata
Invaders Revenge	1982	Microdeal
Island Adventure		Apex Trading
Jaws		Alligata
Jerusalem Adventure 2	1982	Microdeal
Jet Boot Colin		Pocket Money Software
Jet Set Willy	1983	Software Projects
Johnny Reb	1983	Lothlorien
Journey To The Centre Of Phobos		Dragonfire Services
Jumbos Troubles	1985	Wizard Software
Jumpjet		Dragon Data
Jungle Juice		Fantasy Software
Junior's Revenge	1983	Dragon Data/Microdeal/Computerware
Juxtaposition: Barons of Ceti V		Wintersoft Software
Karma Carzy		Blaby Computer Games
Katerpillar II		Tom Mix Software
Keys Of Roth		CRL
Keys Of The Wizard		Microdeal
Kids Pack 1 (Dam Attack / Hangman)	1988	Dragonfire Services
King Of Valley		Abacus
King Tut		Microdeal
Klartz And The Dark Forces		Dungeon Software
Kriegspiel		Beyond
Kung Fu - The Master		Blaby Computer Games
Land Of Tezrel		Omen
Larkspur Waldorf 2		PSE Computers
Laser Blast		Blaby Computer Games
Laser Gates		J. Morrison (Micros)
Laser Racer		CRL
Laser Run	1984	Blaby Computer Games
Laser Zone		Salamander Software
Lazer Cycles / Mission Dru / Hangman / Breakout		Lasersound Software
Leggit!	1983	Imagine
Leopard Lord		Kayde Software
Line Up 4		Terminal Software
Linkword		Computerware
Lion Heart		Peaksoft
Livingstone		Cable Software
Lord Of The Dragon		Item Limited
Lost In Space		Salamander Software
Lucifer'S Kingdom		Orange Software
Lunar Rescue		B & H Software
Lunar Rover Patrol		Dragon Data/Microdeal
MacDougal's Last Stand	1984	Blaby Computer Games
Mad Monty		Screenplay
Madness & The Minotaur		Dragon Data
Man Hunt	1984	Omen
Manic Miner	1984	Software Projects
Mansion Adventure 1		Microdeal
Mansion of Doom		Dragon Data
Master Cards Player		Program Direct
Matchmaker		Orange Software
Maths Games Pack		Premier Microsystems
Maths Trek	1983	Dungeon Software
Maurice Minor	1983	J. Morrison (Micros)
Mazerace / Spellbase	1985	Dragonfire Services
Metal-On-Metal		Quickbeam Software
Meteoroids		Dragon Data
Micropoly		Temptation Software
Mid Winter		Channel 8 Software
Midas Maze		Dungeon Software
Middle Kingdom / Breakout		Dragon Data
Mind Games Compendium		Oasis Software
Mindbenders		Anik Microsystems
Mined-Out	1983	Quicksilva
Mini Games (Layers/Pontoon/Guess IT/Math Test)		Bamby Software
Miser'S Dream		Microvision
Missile Command & Graphics Demonstration		Djl Software
Missile Defender		Tiger Software
Mission 1 - Project Volcano		R&B Software
Mission Attack	1984	Blaby Computer Games
Mission Moonbase		Phoenix Software
Mission Xk1	1984	J. Morrison (Micros)
Mission-Empire		Hornet Software
Module Man		Microdeal
Monster Mine	1982	Gem Software
Monsters		Softek
Monsters & Magic		Dragon Data
Moon Cresta		Incentive Software
Moon Hopper		Dragon Data/Microdeal/Computerware
Moonhopper		Dragon Data
Morbid Mansion	1984	Blaby Computer Games
Morocco Grand Prix		Microdeal
Movie Producer	1983	Silly Software
Mr Dig		Microdeal
Mr Eater		Programmers Guild
Mublingly / Cecil Plays 21 / Roulette / Craps / Telepahy		Preston (R & AJ)
Mudpies		Microdeal
Mutant War	1984	Blaby Computer Games
Mystery Fun House		Adventure International
Nerble Force		Dragon Data/Microdeal/Computerware
Night Flight		Salamander Software
Nightmare Park		Item Limited
Ninja Warrior		Programmers Guild
Noah'S Ark		Item Limited
North Sea Action		Orange Software
North Sea Oil	1984	Shards Software
Number Chaser		Dragon Data
Number Gulper		Dragon Data
Number Puzzler		Dragon Data
Oil Baron		Whitsoft
Oil Recovery		Premier Microsystems
Olympia		Blaby Computer Games
Operation Safras (Pettigrew II)	1984	Shards Software
Orb		Impact Software
Ossie		Peaksoft
Othello (Oasis)		Oasis Software
Othello (Software for All)		Software For All
Othello (Twig)		Twig Systems Software
Pacdroids		Programmers Guild
Pairs (Premier)		Premier Microsystems
Pairs (Software for All)		Software For All
Pane Damage		Anik Microsystems
Patti-Pak	1983	Eurosoft
Pedro	1984	Imagine
Pendragon Space Trader		Abacus
Pengon		Microdeal
Pepper'S Games Pack		Wintersoft Software
Perilous Pit		Blaby Computer Games
Perseus & Andromeda		Channel 8 Software
Pettigrew's Diary	1983	Shards Software
Phantom Slayer	1983	Microdeal
Pharohs Curse	1984	Apex Trading
Phasor Power		Anik Microsystems
Photo-Finish		Peaksoft
Picnic Adventure		Kayde Software
Picture Puzzle		Lyversoft
Pimania	1982	Automata
Pinball (Apex Trading)		Apex Trading
Pinball (Microdeal)	1983	Microdeal
Pirate		Abrasco Ltd
Pirate Adventure		Adventure International
Pirates Ahoy		Compusense
Pit Fiend	1984	Microdeal/Pocket Money Software
Planet Conquest		Blaby Computer Games
Planet Invasion		Microdeal
Pogo-Jo		J. Morrison (Micros)
Poker		Compusense
Pontoon (Computerware)		Computerware
Poseidon Adventure		Dragon Data
Pratfall Pearly		Scorpio Software
Program Pack 1		Microdeal
Program Pack 2		Microdeal
Program Pack 3		Microdeal
Program Pack 4	1983	Microdeal
Program Pack 5	1983	Microdeal
Protector (Algray)		Algray
Protector (Programmers Guild)		Programmers Guild
Pub Crawl		B & H Software
Puzzler	1983	Shards Software
Pyradventure	1987	Dragonfire Services
Pyramid Of Doom		Adventure International
Qiks		Spectral Associates
QMON	1986	Microvision
Quazimodo		Cable Software
Quest (Dragon Data)		Dragon Data
Quest (Impact Software)		Impact Software
Questprobe - Spiderman		Adventure International
Questprobe 1 - The Hulk		Adventure International
Quickshot I	1984	Microdeal
Quickshot II (SVI-102)	1984	Microdeal
Quinky in the Caves of Doom		PSE Computers
Quiz Pack (Crossword / Wordwise)	1983	Shards Software
Racer Ball		Microdeal
Rail Runner (Dragon Data)	1982	Dragon Data
Rail Runner (Microdeal)	1985	Microdeal
Rainbow Writer		Microdeal
Rally Adventure	1988	Pulser Software
Red Alert		Wizard Software
Red Meanies		Salamander Software
Renju - Radio Ham		PSE Computers
Return of the Ring		Wintersoft Software
Return To Pirates Island		Adventure International
Reversi (Trojan)		Trojan Products
River Of Fire		J. Morrison (Micros)
Robin Hood		Pocket Money Software
Robin Hood (Potent Adventures)		Portent Adventures
Rola-Ball		Compusense
Rola-Ball 2		Starship Software
Roman Empire		Lothlorien
Romik Cube		Romik Software
Rommel 3D		Microdeal
Rommel's Revenge		Design Design
Ruby Robba		Blaby Computer Games
Ruby Runabout		Scorpio Software
Samsim		Dragon Data
Samurai Warrior		Lothlorien
SAS		Peaksoft
Savage Island Part 1		Adventure International
Savage Island Part 2		Adventure International
Scanner 13		Bamby Software
Scarfman		Microdeal
School Maze		Dragon Data
Screaming Abdabs	1985	A & F Software
Scribe		Premier Microsystems
Sea Quest		Dragon Data
Secret Mission		Adventure International
Setter		Dragsoft
Sewer Rat		PSE Computers
Sewer Rats / Raiders		Blaby Computer Games
Shaft	1983	Dragon Data
Shaolin Master		Quickbeam Software
Shaolin Master Plus		Quickbeam Software
Shape Up		Dragon Data
Shaper		Shards Software
Shark Treasure		Dragon Data/Microdeal/Computerware
Shenanigans		Dragon Data
Sherlock		Orange Software
Shocktrooper		Microdeal
Show Jump		Computerware
Shrunken Scientist	1988	Orange Software
Shuttle Zap		Eurohard
Shuttlezap		Dragon Data
Simon		Apex Trading
Simon Says		Touchmaster
Simon Shapes		Touchmaster
Simon Squares		Touchmaster
Simply Simon		Touchmaster
Sir Leapin' Lancelot		Anik Microsystems
Sir Randolf of the Moors		Griffin Software
Sirius Iv		Wizard Software
Six-Aside-Soccer		Quickbeam Software
Sketch-A-Puzzle		Diand Software
Skid Row		Microdeal
Skier		CRL
Skramble		Microdeal
Skyjoust	1983	J. Morrison (Micros)
Slide		Microdeal/Pocket Money Software
Slow But Sure		Dragsoft
Smash		Wizard Software
Snakebite		Diand Software
Snow Queen		Cambrian Computersolve
Snow Queen 7+		Shards Software
Sorcerer Of Claymorgue Castle		Adventure International
Space Castle		Wizard Software
Space Fighter		Microdeal
Space Mission		Gem Software
Space Monopoly		Microdeal
Space Race		Compusense
Space Raiders		Microdeal
Space Shuttle		Microdeal
Space Trek (Dragon Data)		Dragon Data
Space Trek (Trojan)		Trojan Products
Space Trek 1		Dragonfire Services
Space Trek 2		Dragonfire Services
Space Trek 3		Dragonfire Services
Space War		Microdeal
Space Wrek		Microdeal
Speed Racer		Microdeal
Spellbound: Besieged		Sulis Software
Spider	1983	Premier Microsystems
Splosh		Abacus
Sporting Decathlon		Paramount
Sprite Designer	1983	Orange Software
Spy Against Spy		Pulser Software
St George and the Dragons		CRL
Stalag / Eno		Dragon Data
Star Cargo		Scorpio Software
Star Defence		Blaby Computer Games
Star Spores		Microdeal
Star Swoop	1984	Blaby Computer Games
Star Trek		Salamander Software
Star Trek / Reversi		Preston (R & AJ)
Starfighter (Dragon Data)		Dragon Data
Starfighter (Micros)		J. Morrison (Micros)
Stargate		Abacus
Starjammer		Salamander Software
Starke Island		Orange Software
Starman Jones	1984	Blaby Computer Games
Starship Chameleon		Dragon Data/Microdeal/Computerware
Starship Destiny		Pulser Software
Starting Fractions		Wizard Software
Startrek (Impact Software)		Impact Software
Startrek (PSS)		PSS
Starword		Wizard Software
Stockmarket (Asp Software)		Asp Software
Stockmarket (Bamby Software)		Bamby Software
Stone Raider Ii		Microdeal
Storm	1982	Microdeal
Storm Arrows		Dragon Data
Strange Odyssey		Adventure International
Strategic Command (Romik)		Romik Software
Strategic Command (Touchmaster)		Touchmaster
Strategy		Wizard Software
Submarine Command		Program Direct
Submarine Commander		B & H Software
Sultan's Maze		Gem Software
Sunken City		Slik Software
Sunken Ghost		Dragonfire Services
Supa Nova		Orange Software
Super Fruit Machine		Premier Microsystems
Super Skill Hangman	1983	Salamander Software
Super Spy (Amplasoft)		Ampalsoft
Super Spy (Richard Shepherd Software)	1983	Richard Shepherd Software
Superbowl		Cable Software
Superkid		Quickbeam Software
SuperNova	1988	Orange Software
Surprise		Bamby Software
Swashbuckler		A & F Software
Syzygy		Microdeal
Table Adventures	1984	Dragon Data
Take The Strain		Twig Systems Software
Talking Android Attack		Microdeal
Tangle Wood		Microdeal
Tank Battle		Premier Microsystems
Taskship (Micros)		J. Morrison (Micros)
Taskship (Programmers Guild)		Programmers Guild
Tea Time	1984	Pocket Money Software
Tee Off		Dragon Data
Temple Of Doom		Blaby Computer Games
Temple Of Zoren		Dungeon Software
Ten Little Indians		Channel 8 Software
Terror Castle		Quickbeam Software
Terror From The Deep		Kayde Software
Tetris		PSE Computers
Textstar	1982	PSS
The Animator		Screenplay
The Bells		Blaby Computer Games
The Bomb!		Dragonfire Services
The Chocolate Factory / Fabrica de Chicles	1983	Eurohard
The Count		Adventure International
The Cricklewood Incident	1983	Salamander Software
The Crystal Chalice		Dungeon Software
The Curse of Camarc	1988	Orange Software
The Dark Pit		Microdeal
The Dragon Composer		Microdeal
The Emperor Must Die		Phoenix Software
The Fall Of Rome		Asp Software
The Filing System		Active Software
The Games Cassette		Datacom Publications
The Golden Baton	1984	Channel 8 Software
The Great Fish Van Scandal		Orange Software
The Immortal Strain		Dragonfire Services
The Ket Trilogy	1985	Incentive Software
The King	1982	Microdeal
The Lost Tower Of Tintagel		Portent Adventures
The Manager		Dungeon Software
The Meddler		Nemesis
The Mystery Of The Java Star	1984	Shards Software
The Puzzler		Computerware
The Quiz		Twig Systems Software
The Ring Of Darkness		Wintersoft Software
The Roundsby Incident		Kayde Software
The Seven Hills		Anik Microsystems
The Shrunken Scientist		Quickbeam Software
The Swamp		Kayde Software
The Sword and the Sorcerer	1984	Blaby Computer Games
The Tiger Grand Prix	1983	Tiger Software
The Time Machine		Channel 8 Software
The Tower		Twig Systems Software
The Trial Of Arnold Blackwood		Nemesis
The Valley (Asp Software)		Asp Software
The Valley (Kayde)	1983	Kayde Software
The Vortex Factor		Microdeal
The Water Of Life		Abacus
The White Barrows		Asp Software
The White Cliffs Of Dover		Salamander Software
The Wizard Of Akyrz		Channel 8 Software
The Wizards Lair		Blaby Computer Games
Thirteenth Task		Orange Software
Tick Tock	1984	Gravesend Home Computers
Tim Love's Cricket		Peaksoft
Time Bandit	1984	Microdeal
Time Jumper		Lothlorien
Time Lord		Incentive Software
Time Machine Search		Dragonfire Services
Time Port 1		Wizard Software
Time Port 2 - The Staff Of Life		Wizard Software
Time Traveller		Sulis Software
Tiny Touch'N'Go		Dorling Kindersley Software
Tombstone & Codcreek		PSE Computers
Tombstone And Cod Creek		Quickbeam Software
Toppler		Microdeal/Pocket Money Software
Total Eclipse		PSE Computers
Touchdown		Wizard Software
Touch'N'Go	1984	Goldstar
Touchstone	1984	Microdeal
Trace Chase		Wizard Software
Trace Race	1983	Cable Software
Transylvanian Tower	1983	Richard Shepherd Software
Treasure Tombe		Dungeon Software
Treasures of Barsoom		Microdeal
Trekboer		Microdeal
Triplet		Wizard Software
Trivial Crosswords		Quickbeam Software
Trun		Blaby Computer Games
Tubeway Army		Design Design
Turnover		Orange Software
Tyrant Of Athens		Lothlorien
UGH!		Softek
Ultimate Adventure 4	1982	Microdeal
Ultrapede		Softek
Underbeings Of Croth		Dragonfire Services
Up Periscope		Beyond
Usurper of Rune	1985	Wintersoft Software
Utopia		Dragonfire Services
UXB	1984	Virgin
Variety Pack		Qed Systems
Vegas Jackpot	1984	Mastertronic
Video Challenge 1		Qed Systems
Video Challenge 2		Qed Systems
Viking		Dragon Data
Volcanic Dungeon		Carnell Software
Voodoo Castle		Adventure International
Vulcan Noughts And Crosses	1982	Salamander Software
Vultures		J. Morrison (Micros)
War Hammer of Gilibran	1988	Orange Software
Warlord	1982	Lothlorien
Waxworks		Channel 8 Software
Weetabix Versus The Titchies		Romik Software
Weirds Of Kesh		Quickbeam Software
Whirlybird Run		Dragon Data
White Crystal		Romik Software
Who Said That		Item Limited
Wild West Destiny		Pulser Software
Williamsburg Adventure 3	1982	Microdeal
Willys Revenge		Abacus
Wings of War	1984	Salamander Software
Wizard		Wizard Software
Wizard Pinball		Wizard Software
Wizard War	1982	Salamander Software
Wizards Lair		Preston (R & AJ)
Wizards Quest		Microdeal
Word Search	1986	Computerware
Worlds Of Flight		Microdeal
Wormtube		Hornet Software
Yahtcee		Anik Microsystems
Yakzee	1983	Automata
Zak'sson		Cable Software
Zorakk the Conqueror		Icon Software
Zotoka		Preston (R & AJ)

== Differences from the TRS-80 Color Computer ==
Both the Dragon and the TRS-80 Color Computer are based on a Motorola data sheet design for the MC6883 SAM (MMU) chip for memory management and peripheral control.

The systems are sufficiently similar that a significant fraction of the compiled software produced for one machine will run on the other. Software running via the built-in Basic interpreters also has a high level of compatibility, but only after they are re-tokenized, which can be achieved fairly easily by transferring via cassette tape with appropriate options.

The same memory region is mapped to the keyboard matrix on both machines, but the key assignments are different. The addresses and values used by Color Computer programs could therefore be changed to addresses and values suitable for the Dragon as part of a porting exercise.

It is possible to permanently convert a Color Computer into a Dragon by swapping the original Color Computer ROM and rewiring the keyboard cable.

The Dragon has additional circuitry to make the MC6847 VDG compatible with European 625-line PAL television standards, rather than the US 525-line NTSC standard, and a Centronics parallel printer port not present on the TRS-80. Some models were manufactured with NTSC video for the US and Canadian markets.
