= Jet Set Willy II =

1985 video game

Jet Set Willy II: The Final Frontier
- Developers: Derrick P. Rowson and Steve Wetherill (Amstrad); Derrick P. Rowson (Spectrum); John Darnell and Steve Birtles (C64)
- Publisher: Software Projects
- Designer: Matthew Smith
- Series: Miner Willy
- Platforms: ZX Spectrum, Commodore 64, Amstrad CPC, Acorn Electron, BBC Micro, Commodore 16, Amiga, MSX
- Release: 1985
- Genre: Platform
- Mode: Single-player

Jet Set Willy II: The Final Frontier is a platform game released 1985 by Software Projects as the Amstrad CPC port of Jet Set Willy. It was then rebranded as the sequel and ported to other home computers. Jet Set Willy II was developed by Derrick P. Rowson and Steve Wetherill rather than Jet Set Willy programmer Matthew Smith and is an expansion of the original game, rather than an entirely new one.

== Gameplay ==
Miner Willy in The Bathroom (Spectrum)

The map is primarily an expanded version of the original mansion from Jet Set Willy, with only a few new elements over its predecessor several of which are based on rumoured events in JSW that were in fact never programmed (such as being able to launch the titular ship in the screen called "The Yacht" and explore an island). In the ZX Spectrum, Amstrad CPC and MSX versions, Willy is blasted from the Rocket Room into space, and for these 33 rooms he dons a spacesuit.

Due to the proliferation of hacking and cheating in the original game, Jet Set Willy II pays homage to this and includes a screen called Cheat that can only be accessed by cheating.

Control of Willy also differs from the original:

- The player can jump in the opposite direction immediately upon landing, without releasing the jump button.
- Willy now takes a step forward before jumping from a standstill.
- Some previous "safe spots" in Jet Set Willy are now hazardous to the player in Jet Set Willy II, the tall candle in "The Chapel" for example.

The ending of the game is also different.

== Development ==
Padlock II security system

Jet Set Willy II was originally created as the Amstrad conversion of Jet Set Willy by Derrick P. Rowson and Steve Wetherill, but Rowson's use of an algorithm to compress much of the screen data meant there was enough memory available to create new rooms.

It came with a form of enhanced copy protection called Padlock II. To discourage felt tip copying, it had seven pages, rather than the single page used in Jet Set Willy.

Software Projects later had Rowson remove all of the enhancements from the Amstrad version to produce a straight conversion of the original ZX Spectrum version of Jet Set Willy. This version was included on the Ocean Software compilation They Sold A Million released in November 1985.

== Ports ==
The game was ported to the ZX Spectrum, Commodore 64, Commodore 16, BBC Micro, Acorn Electron, and MSX.

Rowson ported the game to the Spectrum alone as Steve Wetherill had moved to Odin Computer Graphics. It has a number of small differences, including the loss of coloured backgrounds in certain screens as the CPC version ran in a 4-colour display mode. In an in-depth article about both the game and the code, Your Spectrum stated that as each room was compressed and took up differing amounts of memory, a room editor would be virtually impossible to write.

The BBC Micro cassette version has 2 rooms not in the ZX Spectrum version, and omits 60 of the rooms, rather than being a subset of it as are the CPC and ZX Spectrum versions.

The C64 screen was a different format to the Amstrad, so the developers were unable to take the data used in the Amstrad and instead had to lay out again and re-implement all the screens and sprites, but Rowson was able to use much of the data directly from the Amstrad, and hence the game was released sooner.

== Reception ==
The original Amstrad version, released as Jet Set Willy, reached number 2 in the Amstrad games chart for the four weeks up to 16 April 1985. Amstrad Computer User called it "one of the best CPC games around".

Its release as Jet Set Willy II was less well received with Sinclair User's Clare Edgeley calling it the "biggest rip off of them all", while Home Computing Weekly accused Software Projects of "trying to flog it as a new game". Crash said the game was good, but little progress had been made from the original.

The Spectrum and Commodore 64 versions of Jet Set Willy entered the Gallup Top 20 chart in the fortnight up to 12 July 1985, at number 8, rising to number 7 on the following chart.

Mastertronic released the game on its Ricochet label in late 1988. While reviewers called the game dated, particularly criticizing the graphics as laughable and "stick-like", they conceded that the gameplay was still "pretty excellent" - the same reviewer who accused the graphics of being "stick-like" also stated that it was "one of [his] all-time favourite games" and "worth a peek". The £1.99 release reached number 7 in the ZX Spectrum budget games chart.

== Legacy ==
Unofficial ports have been written for the Acorn Archimedes, Microsoft Windows, MS-DOS, and the X Window System.

In November 2016 Rowson released JSW2+ as an update. Technical improvements allow for more complicated rooms, and it has built-in cheat devices allowing infinite lives and teleportation. Rowson also added some new rooms, and made many of the rooms easier with fewer or slower sprites.
