= Star Paws =

1987 video game

- Cover art
- Developer: John Darnell
- Publisher: Software Projects
- Composer: Rob Hubbard
- Platforms: Amstrad CPC, Commodore 64, ZX Spectrum
- Release: July 1987
- Genre: Action
- Mode: Single-player

Star Paws is an action video game released by Software Projects for the Commodore 64, Amstrad CPC, and ZX Spectrum in 1987.

== Gameplay ==
The game's plot involved captain Rover Pawstrong (a dog in a space suit) in his adventures on a planet, attempting to capture 20 Space Griffins (essentially large, fast chickens). Gameplay involves the player's character running back and forth on a side-scrolling planet surface, attempting to catch the Griffins. The player finds crates which contain items that the player can use to help catch the bird - or the player can simply try and run and jump on top of the bird, thus catching it. During playtime, there is a time limit by which a bird must be caught (indicated by a roast chicken slowly turning into chicken bones), or else the game ends. At later stages in the game, the player must navigate abandoned mines, where the Griffins may be hiding, and even use a mortar to shell Griffins as they move across a landscape.

== Development ==
The game is subject to an urban myth that the unreleased game Attack of the Mutant Zombie Flesh Eating Chickens From Mars, written by Matthew Smith, was adapted to become Star Paws. The only thing that the games have in common is that they were independently developed as games based on the Wile E. Coyote and the Road Runner franchise. When Software Projects failed to get the official license, John Darnell's game was adapted to become Star Paws, while Smith's game wasn't developed any further.
