= Sir Lancelot (video game) =

1984 video game

- Developers: Stephen Cargill "Arnie"; Ian Piumarta
- Publisher: Melbourne House
- Platforms: ZX Spectrum, Amstrad CPC
- Release: 1984
- Genre: Platform
- Mode: Single-player

Sir Lancelot is a platform game published in 1984 by Melbourne House for the Amstrad CPC and ZX Spectrum home computers.

== Gameplay ==
Gameplay screenshot of Spectrum

Sir Lancelot, controlled by the player, must explore the 24 rooms of the castle and collect all the objects (which come in many forms but glow to make them identifiable) in each room before making his way to the exit to the next. His task is made more difficult by the presence of various guardians (including animals and soldiers) who he must avoid in each room. He also has a time limit in which to complete each room. Control is simple, with only three keys needed: left, right and jump. A joystick can also be used.

The ZX Spectrum version has the rooms visited progressively whilst the Amstrad CPC version allows the rooms to be completed in any order. The Amstrad version also has a high-score table which the Spectrum version lacks.

== Reception ==
Reception

Review score
Publication	Score
Crash	90%

== See also ==
- Manic Miner
