= Chuckie Egg =

1983 video game

- Developers: A&F Software
- Publishers: A&F Software; Pick & Choose
- Designer: Nigel Alderton
- Platforms: BBC Micro, ZX Spectrum, Dragon, Acorn Electron, Commodore 64, MSX, Einstein, Amstrad CPC, Atari 8-bit, Amiga, Atari ST, IBM PC
- Release: 1983
- Genre: Platform
- Modes: Single-player, multiplayer

Chuckie Egg is a platform game released by A&F Software in 1983 initially for the ZX Spectrum, BBC Micro, and Dragon 32/64. It was ported to the Commodore 64, Acorn Electron, MSX, Tatung Einstein, Amstrad CPC and Atari 8-bit computers. It was later updated for the Amiga, Atari ST and IBM PC compatibles.

The game was written by Nigel Alderton, then 16 or 17 years old, inspired by arcade games including Space Panic. After a month or two of development, Nigel took a pre-release version of his Spectrum code to the two-year-old software company A&F, co-founded by Doug Anderson and Mike Fitzgerald (the "A" and "F", respectively). Doug took on the simultaneous development of the BBC Micro version, whilst Mike Webb, an A&F employee, completed the Dragon port.

Levels are largely the same between versions, and all the 8-bit versions have been cited as classics.

== Gameplay ==
BBC Micro gameplay

As Hen-House Harry, the player must collect the twelve eggs positioned in each level, before a countdown timer reaches zero. In addition there are piles of seed which may be collected to increase points and stop the countdown timer for a while, but will otherwise be eaten by hens that patrol the level, causing them to pause. If the player touches a hen or falls through a gap in the bottom of the level, they lose a life. Each level is made of solid platforms, ladders, and occasionally lift platforms that move upwards and when they reach the top of the screen wrap around to the bottom. Hitting the top of the screen while on one of these lifts, however, will also cause the player to lose a life.

Eight levels are defined and are played initially under the watch of a giant caged duck. Upon completion of all eight the levels are played again without hens, but Harry is now pursued by the freed duck flying around the screen and homing in on him. A second completion of all eight levels yields a third play through with both hens and the duck. A fourth pass introduces additional hens. Finally, a fifth pass has the duck and additional hens moving at a greater speed. If the player completes all forty levels then they advance to 'level 41' which is the same as level 33.

The player starts with five lives, and an extra life is awarded every 10,000 points.

== Development ==
Purple and green were chosen as the primary colours for the levels in a similar way to Space Panic. The publisher named the game Chuckie Egg, and the player character Hen-House Harry.

== Reception ==
The original ZX Spectrum release peaked at number 12 in the multiple formats chart in late 1983. The following year the BBC version reached the top of the BBC charts for one week.

The Telegraph named the game one of the "best video game platformers ever", deeming that it had been a "revelation" when released, though it noted that the game would appear dated to a modern player. Ollie Toms of Rock, Paper, Shotgun praised the games' portrayal of the antagonist caged duck, finding that the progression of the game allowed for the player to characterise her effectively. The A-Z of Atari 8-bit Games gave the game a score of 7/10, praising its graphics while criticising its sound effects, and finding that the game had a "certain charm".

The Spectrum version of the game was later rated number 13 in the Your Sinclair Official Top 100 Games of All Time. In 1996, GamesMaster ranked Chuckie Egg 86th on their "Top 100 Games of All Time".

== Legacy ==
Chuckie Egg was followed up in 1985 with a sequel entitled Chuckie Egg 2.

In 2017, a remake titled Super Chuckie Egg was released for mobile devices.

In October 2021, a VIC-20 port of Chuckie Egg was released by Reset64 magazine. This version requires a VIC-20 32k RAM expansion to work.
