= Vegas Jackpot =

1983 video game

- C64 cover
- Developers: R.H. Software; Shuttle Soft; Mr Chip Software; CME
- Publishers: Mastertronic; Mr Chip Software
- Platforms: Atari 8-bit, Acorn Electron, BBC Micro, Commodore 16, Commodore 64, MS-DOS, Dragon 32/64, Plus/4, VIC-20, ZX Spectrum
- Release: 1983: VIC, BBC Micro, Electron; 1984: C64, Spectrum, Dragon; 1985: C16, Plus/4; 1986: Atari 8-bit 1987: MS-DOS
- Genre: Slot machine
- Mode: Single-player

Vegas Jackpot (also known as Las Vegas Jackpot, Jackpot 64, and Jackpot) is a slot machine video game released in 1983 for the BBC Micro and Acorn Electron. It was ported to the VIC-20, Commodore 64, ZX Spectrum, Commodore 16, Plus/4, Atari 8-bit computers, and MS-DOS.

== Gameplay ==
The game simulates a gambling fruit machine. Players insert a coin into the machine's slot and begin spinning the reels, hoping to land a winning combination on a single payline. To enhance their odds, players can hold specific reels or nudge them a limited number of times when permitted. As is customary with gambling in real life, the objective of the game is to win jackpots. The amount of reels on the machine depends on the platform of which the game is played on: there are three reels for the ZX Spectrum, BBC Micro, Acorn Electron, and Dragon 32/64 versions, while other versions have four reels.

== Reception ==
Steve Panak of ANALOG Computing said that Vegas Jackpot was his favorite out of four games he tested, though he states, "Combined with a potpourri of games of chance, the slot machine would have rounded out a nice package; alone, it's a boring waste." A.W. of Home Computing Weekly rated the game with five stars, saying it is a "beautifully written simulation giving superb graphics, animation and use of colour."

JDC of Commodore User says he also likes Jackpot, though there were two issues: the white background was "a bit hard on the eyes after half an hour or so" and the instructions for the game "were not as clear as they should have been", stating, "a novice at the game could waste a lot of time working out how all the features are operated." Zzap!64 gave Vegas Jackpot an overall score of 20%, saying it is a "tedious fruit machine simulation which offers little playability or lasting enjoyment."
