= Dragon Data =

Welsh computer company

Dragon Data Ltd.
- Industry: Computer hardware
- Founded: 1982
- Defunct: 1984
- Fate: No longer in existence (final owner bankrupt)
- Headquarters: Wales, United Kingdom
- Products: Dragon 32 and 64 computers

Dragon Data Ltd. was a Welsh producer of home computers during the early 1980s. These computers, the Dragon 32 and Dragon 64, strongly resembled the Tandy TRS-80 Color Computer ("CoCo")—both followed a standard Motorola datasheet configuration for the three key components: CPU, SAM (Synchronous Address Multiplexer) and VDG (Video Display Generator). The machines came in both 32 KB and (later) 64 KB versions.

== History ==
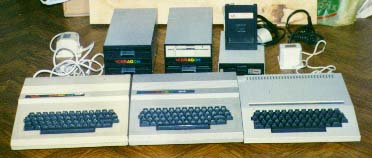
The Dragon 32, Dragon 64 and Dragon 200

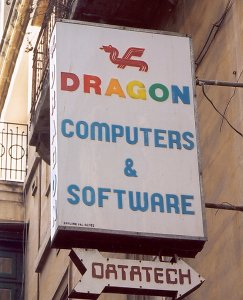
Dragon shop sign

The history of Dragon Data in the period 1982–84 was a checkered one.

The company was originally set up by toy company Mettoy, and after initial good sales looked to have a bright future. At its high point it entered negotiations with Rexnord's Tano Corporation to form a North American branch.

Mettoy then suffered financial difficulties, casting a shadow on the future of Dragon Data before it was spun off as a separate business, forcing the company to seek outside investors and to dispose of a majority stake in this new enterprise. Prudential's technology investment subsidiary, Prutec, took a 41 percent stake, alongside Hill Samuel and the Welsh Development Agency (WDA), leaving Mettoy with a 20 percent stake.

However, a number of circumstances (the delay in introducing the 64K model, poor colour support with a maximum of 4 colours displayable in "graphics mode" and only 2 colours in the highest 256 × 192 pixel mode, the late introduction of the external disk unit and of the supporting OS-9-based software) caused the company to lose market share.

With Dragon Data itself experiencing difficulties, a "survival plan" was formulated by a temporary chief executive appointed by the WDA that "recommended no further investment and a rapid sell-off to another manufacturer", aiming to find an existing computer systems supplier into whose own portfolio the Dragon product would fit. This resulted in GEC taking a stake in the company and appointing its own chief executive. Despite this intervention, GEC itself was only interested in marketing the Dragon products and "would have nothing to do with the company itself". Advertising for the Dragon microcomputers did appear in computing publications featuring the GEC branding.

Dragon Data worked on the next generation of Dragon computers: the Dragon Alpha (or Professional) and Beta (or 128). These systems only made it to the prototype stage before the business went into receivership and was sold on to the Spanish startup Eurohard in 1984. Difficulties in supplying market demand at the right time had left thousands of unsold units with a total estimated retail value of £4-6 million. Eurohard paid just over £1 million for the company's assets, including "patent rights and the entire factory contents: plant and machinery, testing equipment and work in progress", having the physical assets shipped to Spain and literally emptying the factory. Other potentially interested buyers included Tandy and Hitachi, the UK division of the former having made unspecified recommendations to management in the US with regard to any involvement with Dragon Data.

Eurohard also suffered financial problems and went into receivership a couple of years later after the release of the Dragon 200 (a rebranded Dragon 64).

In addition to the Dragon 32 and 64, an MSX-compatible machine, the Dragon MSX reached the prototype stage.
