= Hunchback (video game) =

1983 video game

- Developer: Century Electronics
- Publishers: Century Electronics; Ocean Software
- Platforms: Arcade, Acorn Electron, Amstrad CPC, BBC Micro, Commodore 64, VIC-20, Dragon 32, Oric, MSX, ZX Spectrum
- Release: 1983: Arcade; 1983: C64, Oric, ZX Spectrum
- Genre: Platform

Hunchback (shown as Hunch Back on the title screen) is a video game developed by Century Electronics and published in arcades in 1983. The game is loosely based on the 1831 Victor Hugo novel The Hunchback of Notre-Dame and the player controls Quasimodo. Set on top of a castle wall, the player must guide the Hunchback from left to right while avoiding obstacles on a series of non-scrolling screens. The goal of each screen is to ring the church bell at the far right.

== Gameplay ==
The hunchback is on top of the wall, on the left side of the screen, and needs to ring the bell on the right.

Obstacles include pits which must be swung over on a long rope, ramparts which must be jumped (some of which contain knights with spears) and flying fireballs and arrows (to be ducked or jumped). To impose a time limit on each screen a knight climbs the wall, costing the player a life should he reach the top. After completing all of the screens, the player must rescue Esmeralda. If successful, the game begins again at a faster speed.

== Development ==
The main character was originally Robin Hood with the game set in Sherwood Forest but the setting was changed to Nottingham Castle as the theme was deemed too similar to the game's main inspiration, Pitfall!. The addition of the bell as a reward at the end of each screen led to the main character becoming the Hunchback of Notre Dame instead. A deadline to present the game at an industry show meant there was no time to rework the graphics, so the main character remained in a Lincoln green costume.

== Ports ==
Reception

Review scores
| Publication | Score |
|---|---|
| Crash | 66% |
| Sinclair User | 7/10 |
| Your Sinclair | 25/30 |

An unauthorised version of the game was published by Superior Software for the BBC Micro in 1983, reaching the number one position in the BBC charts. Century Electronics took out an injunction to prevent the game from being sold before reaching a licensing agreement with the publisher.

Ocean Software also licensed the game, publishing ports for the Commodore 64, Oric, and ZX Spectrum in late 1983, with versions for the Acorn Electron, Amstrad CPC, VIC-20, Dragon 32 and MSX released later. It was Ocean's first arcade port and reached number one in the UK sales charts.

== Legacy ==
The home ports inspired two sequels: Hunchback II: Quasimodo's Revenge and Hunchback: The Adventure, which were released by Ocean for the ZX Spectrum and Commodore 64.

Clones released for 8-bit computers are Quasimodo (1983) from Synapse Software for the Atari 8-bit computers and The Great Wall (1986) from Artic Computing for the Acorn Electron and BBC Micro.
