= Jet Set Willy =

1984 platform video game

- Developer: Software Projects
- Publishers: Software Projects; Tynesoft (Atari)
- Designer: Matthew Smith
- Series: Miner Willy
- Platforms: Amstrad CPC, BBC Micro, Acorn Electron, Atari 8-bit, Commodore 16, Commodore 64, Dragon 32, MSX, MTX, PMD 85, TI-99/4A, Xbox 360, ZX Spectrum
- Release: 9 March 1984: ZX Spectrum; 1984: Commodore 64; 1986: Atari 8-bit; 2012: Xbox 360
- Genre: Platform
- Mode: Single-player

Jet Set Willy is a platform video game written by Matthew Smith for the ZX Spectrum home computer. It was published in March 1984 by Software Projects and ported to most home computers of the time.

The game is a sequel to Manic Miner published in 1983, and the second game in the Miner Willy series. It spent over three months at the top of the charts and was the UK's best-selling home video game of 1984.

The player controls Miner Willy as he tidies up his mansion after a massive party to get some sleep. Players navigate Willy through 60 screens of the mansion and grounds, collecting glowing items while avoiding hazards and guardians.

The game features music from Beethoven, Grieg, Bach, and Mozart. Initially the game could not be completed due to various bugs, but fixes for these were released by Software Projects. Jet Set Willy included a copy protection measure in the form of a card with coloured codes, making it more difficult to duplicate. Various expanded versions and ports were released, as well as third-party editing tools that allowed players to design their own rooms and sprites.

== Plot ==
A tired Miner Willy has to tidy up all the items left around his house after a huge party. With this done, his housekeeper Maria will let him go to bed. Willy's mansion was bought with the wealth obtained from his adventures in Manic Miner, but much of it remains unexplored and it appears to be full of strange creatures, possibly a result of the previous (missing) owner's experiments. Willy must explore the enormous mansion and its grounds (including a beach and a yacht) to fully tidy up the house so he can get some much-needed sleep.

== Gameplay ==
Miner Willy in the Cold Store (ZX Spectrum)

Jet Set Willy is a flip-screen platform game in which the player moves the protagonist, Willy, from room to room in his mansion collecting objects. Unlike the screen-by-screen style of its predecessor, the player can explore the mansion at will. Willy is controlled using only left, right and jump. He can climb stairs by walking into them (jumping through them to avoid them) and climb swinging ropes by pushing left or right depending on what direction the rope is swinging. The play area itself consists of 60 playable screens making up the mansion and its grounds and contains hazards (static killer objects), guardians (killer monsters which move along predetermined paths), arrows, various platforms and collectable objects. The collectable items glow to distinguish them from other objects in the room.

Willy loses a life if he touches Maria, a hazard, an arrow, guardian, or falls too far. He is returned to the point at which he entered the room, which may lead to a game-ending situation where Willy repeatedly falls from a height or unavoidably collides with a guardian, losing all lives in succession.

One of rooms in the game is We Must Perform a Quirkafleeg. This is a reference to the comic strip Fat Freddy's Cat, a spin-off from the Fabulous Furry Freak Brothers; in the original comic, the quirkafleeg was an obscure ritual in a foreign country, required to be performed upon the sight of dead furry animals.

=== Music ===
Music on the Spectrum version is Beethoven's Moonlight Sonata for the menu, and Grieg's "In the Hall of the Mountain King" during the game itself. Early versions used "If I Were a Rich Man" as the in-game music, but it was not licensed, and the publishers of the song wanted £36,000 for its use.

Music on the C64 version is Moonlight Sonata on the title screen, and J.S. Bach - Inventions # 1 during gameplay. Some rooms play Mozart's Rondo alla Turca.

=== Bugs ===
Upon release, the ZX Spectrum version could not be completed due to several bugs. Although four completely unrelated issues, they became known collectively as "The Attic Bug". After the player entered The Attic screen, various rooms would undergo corruption for all subsequent playthroughs, including all monsters disappearing from The Chapel screen, and other screens triggering a game over. This was caused by an error in the path of an arrow in The Attic, resulting in the sprite traveling past the end of the Spectrum's video memory and overwriting crucial game data. Initially Software Projects attempted to pass this bug off as an intentional feature to make the game more difficult, claiming that the rooms in question were filled with poison gas, but they later rescinded this claim and issued a set of POKEs to correct the flaws.

Despite these bugs, Ross Holman and Cameron Else won the competition that Software Projects had set for completion of Jet Set Willy and provided Software Projects with a set of bug fixes. Software Projects then hired Cameron Else to port both Manic Miner and Jet Set Willy to the MSX.

== Reception ==
Reception

Award
Publication	Award
Crash	Crash Smash

Reviewing Jet Set Willy for Your Spectrum magazine in June 1984, Sue Denham wrote that the game was "every bit as good and refreshing as the original".

In the final issue of Your Sinclair, the ZX Spectrum version was ranked number 32 on "The Your Sinclair Official Top 100 Games of All Time", and voted number 33 on "The Your Sinclair Readers' Top 100 Games of All Time". In 2004, the ZX Spectrum version was voted the 6th best game all of time by Retro Gamer readers in an article originally intended for a special issue of Your Sinclair bundled with Retro Gamer.

== Copy protection ==
Jet Set Willy came with a form of copy protection: a card with 180 coloured codes on it was bundled with the cassette. Upon loading, one of the codes from the card had to be entered before the game would start. Although the cassette could be duplicated, a copy of the card was also needed and at the time, home colour reproduction was difficult, making Jet Set Willy harder to copy than most Spectrum games, but means of circumventing the card were found, and one method was published in a UK computer magazine.

== Ports ==
A version of Jet Set Willy for the Commodore 64 was released by Software Projects and ported by Shahid Kamal Ahmad.

The original releases of Jet Set Willy for the BBC Micro and the Commodore 64 also contained bugs which made it impossible to complete the game. In the Commodore 64 version, it was impossible to reach all of the items in the Wine Cellar.

There are two versions of the original Jet Set Willy for the MSX. The Software Projects version that was sold in the UK is dated 1984 and was programmed by Cameron Else, co-winner of the Jet Set Willy competition. The other version was published by Hudson Soft in 1985 as a Bee Card in Japan.

Atari 8-bit version

A port of Jet Set Willy for the Atari 8-bit computers was released by Tynesoft in 1986. It received generally poor reviews which criticised inferior graphics and animation, but Rob Hubbard's theme music, unique to this version, was considered a highlight.

A port of the game by Tim Titchmarsh to the Camputers Lynx was released by Phoenixx Software in 1985, and was one of extremely few mainstream games to be converted for that system. The Lynx version was supplied with the cassette inlay from the Spectrum edition.

Ports from Software Projects for the Amiga and Atari ST were cancelled before release, but have since been made available on the internet.

== Legacy ==
=== Expanded versions ===
Jet Set Willy: The Final Frontier, an expanded version for the Amstrad CPC, was later converted back to the ZX Spectrum and released as Jet Set Willy II. Both the original game and Jet Set Willy II were released for the BBC Micro, Acorn Electron, MSX, Commodore 16 and Commodore 64.

A differently expanded version of Jet Set Willy was released for the Dragon 32/64, with extra rooms.

The Dragon port was converted to run on the Acorn Archimedes computers. Better collision detection meant that "The Drive" could now be completed right-to-left, unlike on the Dragon.

=== Third-party modifications ===
In its original Spectrum version, the rooms themselves are stored in a straightforward format, with no compression, making it relatively easy to create customised versions of the game.

The review of JSW in issue 4 of Your Spectrum included a section entitled "JSW — A Hacker's Guide"; remarks in this section imply that the author had successfully deduced at least some of the data structures, since he was able to remove sections of wall in the Master Bedroom. The following year, issue 13 contained a program that added an extra room ("April Showers") to the game, and issue 15 described the data formats in detail.

Several third-party editing tools were published both commercially and as type-in programs, allowing players to design their own rooms and sprites.
