= Software Projects =

Former British video game developer

- Industry: Video games
- Founded: 1983
- Founder: Matthew Smith, Alan Maton
- Headquarters: Bear Brand Complex, Allerton Road, Woolton, Liverpool L25 7SF
- Key people: Matthew Smith, Alan Maton, Tommy Barton, Colin Roach
- Products: Computer games

Software Projects was a computer game development company which was started by Manic Miner developer Matthew Smith, Alan Maton and Liverpool businessman Tommy Barton. After leaving Bug-Byte as a freelance developer, Smith was able to take the rights to his recently developed Manic Miner game with him, due to an oversight in his freelance contract. Software Projects was then able to market and publish the ZX Spectrum hit game separately from Bug-Byte. Their logo was a Penrose triangle.

In 1987, Software Projects released Special FX Software's first title Hysteria.

== Released games ==
- Anaconda
- Astronut
- BC's Quest for Tires
- Binky
- Crazy Balloon
- Crypt Capers
- Dinky Doo
- Dodo Lair
- Dragon's Lair
- Dragon's Lair Part II - Escape from Singe's Castle
- Ewgeebez
- Fatty Henry
- Galactic Gardener
- Harvey Smith Showjumper
- Hunchback at the Olympics
- Hysteria
- Jet Set Willy
- Jet Set Willy II
- Karls Kavern
- Learning with Leeper
- Ledgeman
- Legion
- Lode Runner
- McKensie
- Manic Miner
- Nutcraka
- Ometron
- Orion
- Project Graphics Language
- Push Off
- Space Swarm
- Space Joust
- Star Paws
- The Perils of Willy
- Thrusta
- Tribble Trubble

In 1984 and 1985 they released a number of budget titles at £2.99 on the Software Supersavers label.
