= Matthew Smith (games programmer) =

British video game programmer

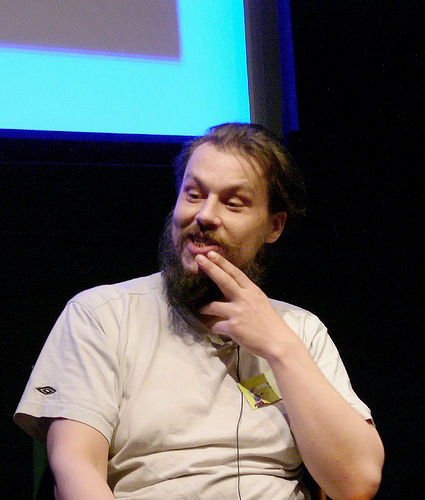
- At the Screenplay festival in Nottingham, UK (2005)
- Born: 1966; Penge, London, England
- Occupation: Video game designer

Matthew Smith is a British video game programmer. He created the games Manic Miner and Jet Set Willy for the ZX Spectrum, released in 1983 and 1984 respectively. Smith left the games industry in 1988 and later moved to the Netherlands. He has since returned to the UK and has worked on some games as well as appearing at conventions and in documentaries.

== Early life ==
Smith was born in Penge. His family moved to Wallasey when he was seven years old.

== Programming career ==
=== 1980s ===
Smith started programming when he received a TRS-80 for Christmas in 1979. His first commercial game was a Galaxian clone for the TRS-80 called Delta Tau One. He then went on to produce Monster Muncher on the VIC-20. Smith has said that he wrote Monster Muncher in 3 hours.

He obtained a ZX Spectrum on loan from Bug-Byte Software Ltd. in return for a freelance contract for three games. The first of these was Styx in 1983 for which Matthew received £3,000.

He wrote Manic Miner in eight weeks using a Model III Tandy. It was the first ZX Spectrum title with in-game music. The sequel, Jet Set Willy, took considerably longer to write. Manic Miner and Jet Set Willy were both commercial successes. Smith has stated that Manic Miner was the most enjoyable game to make for him whereas Jet Set Willy was 'seven shades of hell'.

After the creation of Jet Set Willy he started work on The Mega Tree (commonly known as Willy Meets The Taxman), for publication by his company Software Projects. Unlike his previous two hits The Mega Tree was not developed for the ZX Spectrum but the Commodore 64. The project failed to gain traction and was cancelled three months into development. The development disks containing some of the graphics from the unreleased game were eventually auctioned for charity in 2004.

In 1987 adverts began appearing in games magazines for a new game Attack of the Mutant Zombie Flesh Eating Chickens From Mars said to have been programmed by Smith, and due for release by Software Projects. It is reported that Smith was unhappy with the finished product and it was never released.

=== Departure ===
Smith closed Software Projects in 1988 without completing any more programs. He lived in a Dutch commune from around 1995 but was deported from the Netherlands in October 1997 and returned to Britain, saying that he had failed to keep his residency papers in order. In the late 1990s, he said he was "surprised and flattered" at the amount of attention and speculation he had attracted on the Internet.

=== Return to games ===
In 1999, Smith returned to the UK video game industry by taking a job at Dewsbury-based computer game developer Runecraft.

In 2000, he appeared on a British television documentary programme called Thumb Candy about the history of video games in which, in a brief interview, he discussed Manic Miner and his 1980s career. He has also attended and given talks at retrogaming conventions during this decade.

In 2013, Smith was working on producing a new game with Elite Systems, who have republished his original games on mobile platforms.
