= Wolfman (video game) =

1988 video game

- Publisher: CRL Group
- Designers: Rod Pike; Jared Derrett
- Platforms: Amstrad CPC, Commodore 64, ZX Spectrum
- Release: 1988
- Genre: Interactive fiction
- Mode: Single-player

Wolfman is a text adventure video game released by CRL in 1988 for the Commodore 64, Amstrad CPC, and ZX Spectrum home computers.

== Plot ==
After a heavy sleep the protagonist awakes to find his clothes ripped and bloody, yet no sign of injury to himself. Glancing through a window, he sees the body of a dead girl lying nearby, her throat has been torn out. He then realizes that he is in reality a werewolf, and must escape violent retribution by enraged villagers and somehow find a cure for his illness. After falling in love with a young woman named Nadia, the protagonist must rescue her when she is kidnapped while continuing to seek a cure for his lycanthropy.

== Gameplay ==
The game is a standard text adventure with graphics in some locations to set the scene. It is in three parts, with the player in the role of the Wolfman in the first and third, and of his fiancée in the second.

== Development ==
The game was produced using the Gilsoft Professional Adventure Writer.

== Reception ==
As with the earlier CRL adventures Dracula, Frankenstein, and Jack the Ripper, the game was classified by the British Board of Film Censors, receiving an '18' certificate for its gory graphics.
