= Fergus McNeill =

Author and game designer

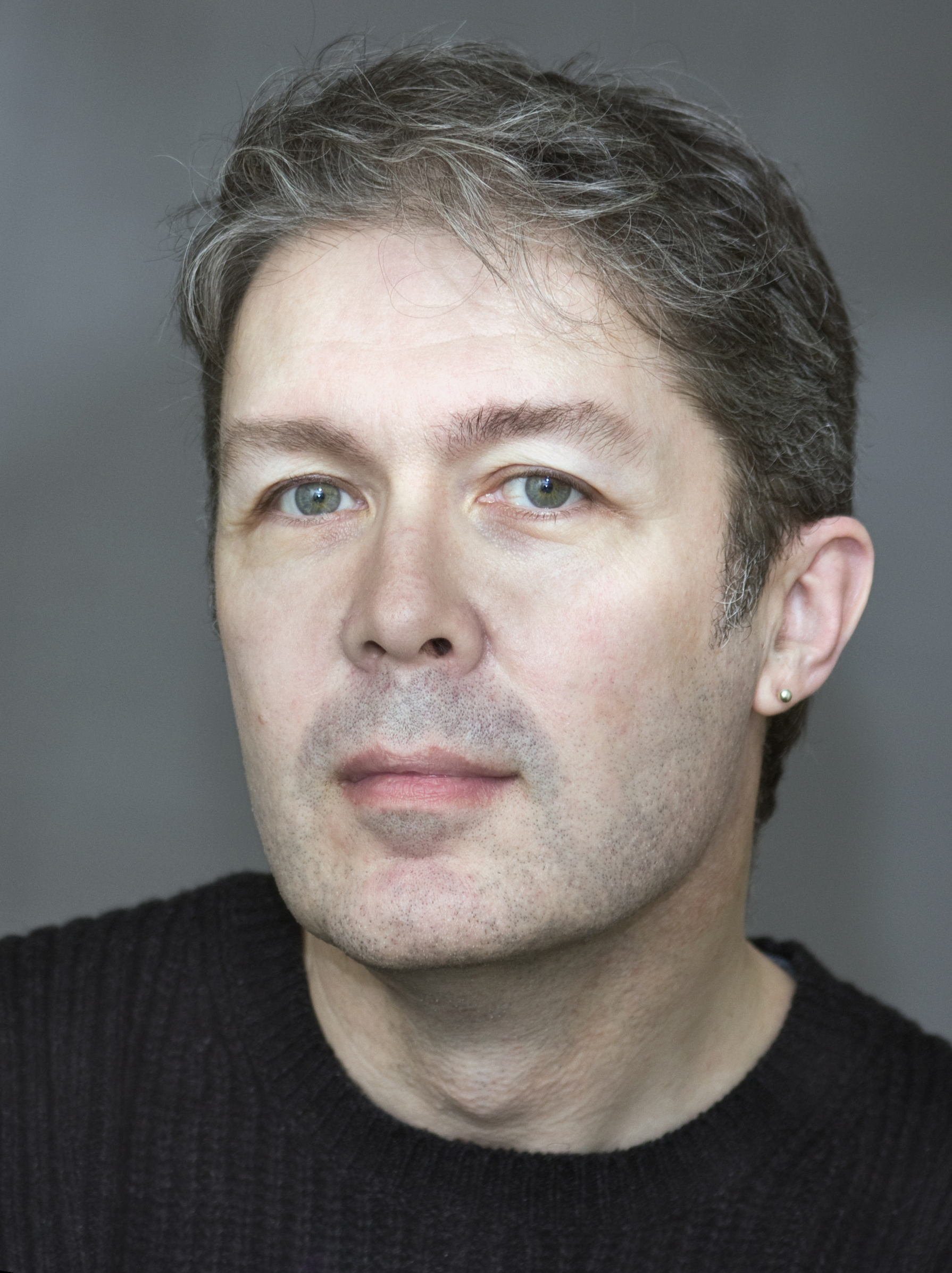
- McNeill in 2017
- Born: Fergus McNeill; 1969 (age 56–57); Scotland
- Occupations: Author and developer
- Known for: Delta 4
- Website: fergusmcneill.blogspot.com

Fergus McNeill (born in 1969) is a Scottish author and interactive entertainment developer. He has designed and created games since the early 1980s, working with companies such as CRL, Silversoft, Macmillan Group, Activision, SCi Eidos and EA. He is a member of the Crime Writers' Association and BAFTA, and is the author of a series of contemporary crime thrillers published by Hodder & Stoughton.

== Life and career ==
McNeill, born in 1969, grew up in Scotland, living in Helensburgh and later in Fintry. When he was 11, his family moved to Hampshire, England, where he attended Swanmore Secondary School. Whilst there, he wrote his first games, which attracted coverage in the specialist computer press, and this led to him abandoning college plans in order to pursue a full-time career in the games industry.

McNeill started developing adventure games using The Quill software. Initially, these were sold by mail-order under the Delta 4 brand, before publishing deals with CRL and Silversoft brought the titles to a larger audience. This led to McNeill working with Terry Pratchett to create the first Discworld game and, later on, adapting Murder off Miami by Dennis Wheatley. After an affiliate label deal with Activision, McNeill set up a new studio for SCi in Southampton, focusing on PC games. While there, he oversaw development on movie tie-ins including The Lawnmower Man, and scripted the award-winning Kingdom O' Magic. He also co-produced (and provided the race announcer's voice-over for) Stainless Software's controversial racing game Carmageddon.

He is a member of the Crime Writers' Association. After SCi, he moved to Smoking Gun Productions, where he worked on a range of football management titles and interactive DVD games, before joining InfoSpace / IOMO as studio director in 2005. Two years later, McNeill and other staff from IOMO relaunched the studio as FinBlade. In 2019 he took on the role of game director at Stainless Games.

== Books ==
In 2011, he signed a three-book deal with Hodder & Stoughton.

- Eye Contact (Detective Harland series #1) first published in 2012
- Knife Edge (Detective Harland series #2) first published in 2013
- Cut Out (Detective Harland series #3) first published in 2014

A Detective Harland novella entitled Broken Fall was released in 2015. A standalone historical thriller, Ashes of America, was published in 2019. The standalone crime thriller Up Close and Fatal was published in 2022.

== Games ==
Early interactive fiction titles and PC CD games

- Sherwood Forest – Delta 4
- The Dragonstar Trilogy – Delta 4
- Quest for the Holy Joystick – Delta 4
- Return of the Holy Joystick – Delta 4
- Bored of the Rings – Delta 4 / CRL / SilverSoft
- Robin of Sherlock – Delta 4 / CRL / SilverSoft
- Galaxias – Delta 4
- The Colour of Magic – Delta 4 / Piranha Software
- The Boggit – Delta 4 / CRL
- The Big Sleaze – Delta 4 / Piranha Software
- Murder off Miami – CRL
- Mindfighter – Abstract Concepts / Activision
- The Smirking Horror – Delta 4 / Destiny
- The Town with No Name – Delta 4
- Psycho Killer – Delta 4
- The Lawnmower Man – SCi
- Cyberwar – SCi
- XS – SCi
- Kingdom O' Magic – SCi
- Carmageddon (co-producer for SCi) – Stainless Software / SCi
- Robosaurs versus the Space Ba$tards – Smoking Gun Productions
- Space Ba$tards: Sudden Justice – Smoking Gun Productions
- Club Manager series – Smoking Gun Productions

More recently, McNeill has worked on the following apps:

- Battleship – FinBlade / EA
- Battleship for iPad – FinBlade / EA
- Deadliest Catch – FinBlade / HandsOn
- Grooveyard – FinBlade
- Movie Quiz – FinBlade
- Ninja Ranch – FinBlade / AppyNation
- Pictureka! – FinBlade / EA
- Red Bull GP – FinBlade / SSP / Red Bull
- The Men Who Stare At Goats – FinBlade / SSP / Momentum Pictures
- Tennis Slam – FinBlade
- WordSearch – FinBlade
- Fry – Virtually Stephen Fry – HeadCastLabs
- Puzzler World – Puzzler Media
- Link-a-Pix – Puzzler Media
- Crosswords – Puzzler Media
- Wordsearch – Puzzler Media
- Pathfinder – Puzzler Media
- Sudoku – Puzzler Media
- Puzzle Paradise – Puzzler Media
- Puzzler – Puzzler Media
- Name Game – Puzzler Media

== Awards ==
- Golden Joystick Award (runner up, 1985)
- Sinclair User Classic Award (5 times)
- Amtix Accolade Award (1986)
- Crash Smash Award (twice)
- CGR Golden Triad Award (1996)
