= St Brides (disambiguation) =

St Brides may refer to:

== Places ==
=== United Kingdom ===
- St Brides, Pembrokeshire, Wales
  - St Brides Bay
- St Brides, Newport, Wales
- St Brides-super-Ely, Vale of Glamorgan, Wales
- St Brides Major, Vale of Glamorgan, Wales
- St Brides Major (community), Vale of Glamorgan, Wales
- St. Brides Netherwent, Monmouthshire, Wales

=== Canada ===
- St. Bride's, Newfoundland and Labrador

== See also ==
- St Bride's Church (disambiguation)
- St Bride's, former Irish spiritual community run by the Silver Sisterhood
- Brigid of Kildare, Saint Bride
- Morrice James, Baron Saint Brides
- St Bride's GFC, a gaelic football club from County Louth, Ireland
- The Secret of St. Brides, 1989 video game
