= The Chap =

British magazine

- Editor: Gustav Temple
- Former editors: Vic Darkwood
- Categories: Men's lifestyle and humour
- Frequency: Quarterly (formerly bi-monthly)
- Format: B5
- Founded: 1999
- Country: UK
- Language: English
- Website: thechap.co.uk

The Chap is a British humorous men's lifestyle magazine published quarterly. It was founded in 1999 by Gustav Temple and Vic Darkwood, and was edited by Temple until 2025.

The magazine proposes that men everywhere return to a more gentlemanly way of life by rejecting modern vulgarity and careless, shabby or faddish dress sense through the restoration of the lifestyle, habits, manners and traditional fashion sense of a mid-20th century (or earlier) British chap. Thus it advises men to wear traditional British suits and other similar well-tailored clothing, especially those cut from tweed; to keep their trousers sharply pressed; to be impeccably groomed; to wear quality handmade shoes, brightly polished; and to return to the everyday wearing of hats.

The Chap has a comic and eccentric twist on this. It jokingly espouses its own unique lifestyle philosophy called anarcho-dandyism and has its own 10-point manifesto, The Chap Manifesto, which mandates that a chap is to smoke a pipe, is to doff his hat when good manners require, is never to wear what it calls pantaloons de Nîmes, and to sport a moustache (never a beard), among others.

== Content ==
While The Chap appreciates British culture and loves tradition, it is strongly rooted in the Situationist strand of anarchism with more than the occasional nod to Dada. It is also indebted to the avant-garde as well as comedy greats such as the Monty Pythons, Peter Cook, Spike Milligan and Viv Stanshall.

The idea for The Chap came out of various conversations with like-minded friends that there was no magazine aimed at gentlemen. Everything was either for vulgarians…or for the specialist hobby... So I thought, let’s start a magazine that offers advice on personal grooming, elegance and modern manners which isn’t beholden to advertisers and which is light-hearted yet firm in its stance against vulgarity. This was in 1999.

— Gustav Temple, co-founder

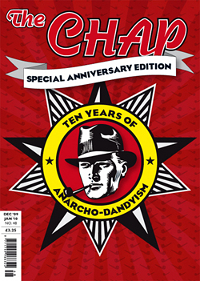
Front cover of The Chap no. 48, the tenth anniversary issue.

The Chap is a mixture of articles on clothing, footwear and headwear; on sport (mainly cricket and horse racing); on moustache grooming; on polite manners and traditional British etiquette; and on pipes and tobacco, all written in an anachronistic late-Victorian to mid-20th Century British style, interspersed with humorous jokes. For instance, the "Am I Chap" section sees people sending in photos of themselves dressed in vintage attire, on which the magazine's editors almost always comment derisively in a very withering, but humorous, fashion.

The Chap is a bit like a club – there are lots of cosy in-jokes and references, though we also like to display affectionate disdain for some of the readers who send in their photos dressed as “Chaps”, merely to remind everyone that we actually believe in dressing properly or not at all. I recently conducted a reader survey and one of the questions was “Should we get rid of ‘Am I Chap?’” The response was unanimously against, in other words, despite the criticism, readers love that column.

— Gustav Temple

The Chap also features articles on a diverse range of things related to Chappism, such as tales of First World War and Second World War military derring-do, stories or tips on unusual ways to travel when abroad, or the late Victorian and Edwardian martial art of Bartitsu.

The magazine has often been very satirical or whimsical, with content such as a series chronicling "A Year in Catford" and "Amusing Monograph as to the Various Pleasures and Diversions Afforded by One's Valet".

Notable contributors to The Chap include Michael "Atters" Attree who conducts interviews with those known for their gentlemanly or dandyish ways, and Miss Martindale, a prominent spokesperson of Aristasia, who from 2003 to 2005 wrote the Ladies' Column. Its current literary editor is the author and historian Alexander Larman.

== Publication history ==
The magazine is printed in B5 format, and originally was published in that format as well. In May 2009, the magazine nearly closed due to financial issues arising from moving from B5 to the larger A4 format. To keep going The Chap asked its readership and subscribers to donate funds. Additionally, Viz Magazine financially supported the magazine. It returned to B5 to reduce printing costs.

The Chap was published bi-monthly from 1999 to May 2017.

From issue #92 published in May 2017, the magazine has been published quarterly, has double the number of pages, and has been graphically redesigned. On this "relaunch" the editor said:

Britain’s longest-running gentlemen’s periodical has relaunched, with impeccable timing. The Chap has refined its image, expanded its editorial reach and broadened its horizons. When launched in 1999, its message was completely at odds with the prevailing culture of lads’ mags. The world has caught up with The Chap because its platform no longer seems eccentric or quirky.

— Gustav Temple, editor

In summer of 2025, the magazine ceased publication and announced it was becoming a members’ society.

== Chap events ==
The Chap used to host the annual summer Chap Olympiad which was normally held in Bedford Square Gardens in London.

The magazine has also conducted a number of balls called the Grand Anarcho-Dandyist Balls.

=== Chap protests ===
The magazine has also organised several serious and semi-serious protests, all conducted in the unique tongue-in-cheek Chap style. These include:

- in 2003, the Chap Uprising – against what they see as modern living's vulgarity in general;
- in 2004, the Victoria & Albert Museum Protest – a protest "against the pointless intrusion by contemporary art pieces into public areas";
- in 2004, Civilise the City – a walk through central London whose aim was "to draw attention to the appalling lack of gentlemanly services available on Britain's high streets";
- in 2006, the Tate Modern Protest – against modern art installations; and
- in 2012, the Siege of Savile Row – against the proposed opening of an Abercrombie and Fitch store at the centre of traditional English gentleman's tailoring, Savile Row.

== Chap publications ==
In addition to the magazine, a number of books have been published by The Chap over the years: these include How To Be Chap and books both on cooking and drinking for "chaps".

Title	Year	Type	Pages	Author
How To Be Chap	2016	compilation	272	Gustav Temple & Gestalten
Drinking for Chaps	2015	drinks	160	Gustav Temple & Olly Smith
Cooking for Chaps	2014	recipes	224	Gustav Temple & Clare Gabbett-Mulhallen
Am I A Chap?	2011	compilation	199	Gustav Temple
The Best of The Chap	2005	compilation	192	Gustav Temple & Vic Darkwood
Around the World in Eighty Martinis: The Logbook of a Remarkable Voyage Undertaken	2003	travelogue	144	Gustav Temple & Vic Darkwood
The Chap Almanac: An Esoterick Yearbook for the Decadent Gentleman	2002	collection	144	Gustav Temple & Vic Darkwood
The Chap Manifesto: Revolutionary Etiquette For The Modern Gentleman	2001	treatise	138	Gustav Temple & Vic Darkwood
