= Miss Martindale =

British writer

Marianne Martindale (also known as Catherine Tyrell, Mari de Colwyn, Mary Scarlett and Mary Guillermin) is an English writer and columnist. As Miss Martindale, she was a prominent public face of Aristasia, an all-female subculture inspired by the Traditionalist School and early twentieth-century culture.

== Biography ==
From 1982 to 1992 Martindale was one of the leaders of the Silver Sisterhood, a Goddess-worshiping new religious movement described as a cult, based in Burtonport, County Donegal in Ireland. The group is known for creating early text adventure video games such as Bugsy and Jack the Ripper, the first game to be given an '18' rating.

Martindale co-founded the Wildfire Club publishing house and edited a collection of stories titled Disciplined Ladies. She received national attention in the British press in the 1990s for her advocacy of corporal punishment. Martindale believed in corporal discipline as spiritual and purifying. Due to the use of caning among the Silver Sisterhood and its prominence in the group's later years, the group was described as fetishistic in nature.

Martindale always maintained that, as an Aristasian, she was neutral on matters of "Tellurian" (Earth) politics. Martindale claimed to be a royalist and imperialist, but with loyalty only to the Aristasian monarchy and empire. Despite this, she regularly wrote letters to John Tyndall, a neo-Nazi activist and the founder of the British National Party. Additionally, antisemitic and far-right publications were found in St Bride's, the residence of the Silver Sisterhood, after they left in 1992.

Martindale was convicted of assault in 1993 for the caning of a young woman at St Bride's. In 1999 she married English film director John Guillermin. Martindale was featured in a 2022 BBC Radio Ulster podcast about St. Bride's, in which she describes herself as working currently as a marriage therapist in California and having adopted an adult son and two of his friends. She also stated that Guillermin's favourite film that he made was the 1965 film Rapture. She said that it was the only film he directed that wholly satisfied his vision as an artist.
