= The Snow Queen (video game) =

1985 video game

- Developer: St. Bride's School
- Publisher: Mosaic Publishing
- Designers: Marianne Scarlett; Priscilla Langridge
- Engine: The Quill
- Platforms: Commodore 64, ZX Spectrum
- Release: 1985
- Genre: Interactive fiction
- Mode: Single-player

The Snow Queen is an interactive fiction game created by Irish developer St. Bride's School and published by Mosaic Publishing for the Commodore 64 and ZX Spectrum in 1985. It is based on the 1844 fairy tale "The Snow Queen" by Hans Christian Andersen.

== Plot ==
The story closely follows the story of "The Snow Queen" by Hans Christian Andersen. The player takes on the role of Gerda, whose friend Kay has been kidnapped by the Snow Queen and taken to her home in the mountains. Gerda must attempt to rescue her friend.

== Reception ==
The Snow Queen was generally moderately well received, including review scores of 60% from Computer Gamer, 21/30 from Computer & Video Games, 7/10 from Crash, four out of five stars from Sinclair User, 5/10 and 7/10 from Your Sinclair, and 60% from Zzap!64.
