= Delta 4 =

Defunct software developer known for The Town With No Name

- Industry: Video games
- Founded: 1984; 42 years ago
- Founder: Fergus McNeill
- Defunct: 1992; 34 years ago
- Fate: Defunct
- Headquarters: United Kingdom
- Website: Delta4.co.uk

Delta 4 was a British software developer founded by Fergus McNeill, writing and publishing interactive fiction.

Delta 4 designed games between 1984 and 1992. Some were self-published, others were released by CRL Group, Piranha Software, Silversoft, or On-Line Entertainment. Delta 4 were also credited with providing the code for Jonathan Nash's tape magazine YS2 which was given away free with Your Sinclair magazine and published by Future Publishing.

== History ==
Delta 4 was formed by McNeill with a few friends whilst still at school. Their debut text adventure games were the Dragonstar trilogy ("...like Classic Adventure but without the interesting bits") and two Holy Joystick comedy adventures, self-published in 1984. Gilsoft's The Quill was the design software.

Their first critical success was Bored of the Rings, inspired by the Harvard Lampoon novel of the same name. Published in 1985, it received a Sinclair User Classic award. They also published Robin of Sherlock.

In the early 1990s, Delta 4 developed several CD-based games. The Town with No Name, Psycho Killer and The Hound of the Baskervilles were all developed using D.U.N.E. (Developers Universal Non-programming Environment), and all games were panned by both critics and players.

== Games developed ==
- Sherwood Forest (Delta 4, 1984)
- The Dragonstar Trilogy (Delta 4, 1984)
- Quest for the Holy Joystick (Delta 4, 1984)
- Return of the Holy Joystick (Delta 4, 1984)
- Bored of the Rings (Delta 4/CRL Group, 1985)
- Robin of Sherlock (Silversoft, 1985)
- Galaxias (Delta 4, 1986)
- The Colour of Magic (Piranha Software, 1986)
- The Boggit (CRL Group, 1986)
- The Big Sleaze (Piranha Software, 1987)
- Murder Off Miami (CRL Group, 1987)
- The Town with No Name (Delta 4/On-Line, 1992)
- Psycho Killer (Delta 4/On-Line, 1992)

=== Psycho Killer ===
Psycho Killer
- Developer: Delta 4
- Publisher: On-Line Entertainment
- Platforms: Commodore CDTV, MS-DOS
- Release: 1992 (CDTV) and 1993 (MS-DOS).
- Genres: Action-adventure, graphic adventure

Psycho Killer is a graphic action-adventure game released by On-Line Entertainment in 1992 for the Commodore CDTV. A version for MS-DOS was released in 1993.

The first out of many quick-time events in Psycho Killer. The player must click the brake to stop the car. If the player fails to do this in time, the protagonist drives into the idle car, making it explode and triggering a game over.

The game involves the protagonist (unnamed in game but listed in credits as "John Schulz") going on a quest in order to save a woman (listed as "Sarah Collins") from a murderer ("Morgan James"), and to save himself. The graphics for the game were created using digitised still photographs that were taken in the suburbs of London.

Gameplay of Psycho Killer is restricted to a point-and-click interface, such as clicking certain arrows to go their respective direction. There are multiple times in the game where the player must respond promptly to a quick time event in order to proceed to the next scene. Failure to do so can result in the game ending with the protagonist's death.

Reception

Review scores
Publication	Score
Amiga Format	13%
Amiga Joker	3/5

In issue 32 of Amiga Format, the reviewer gave the game 13% and complained of "poor gameplay", comparing it to an "interactive home movie" and asked who would want to play a game featuring a "spotty herbert who drives a Vauxhall Chevette". The game was reviewed again in issue 39 of the same magazine; the review gave it the same score, and complained again about the poor gameplay.

Amiga Joker reviewed the game more positively. The magazine gave the game a 3/5, stating, "with a little bit of goodwill, the game could be described as a interactive movie". The magazine ended the review calling the game "the best pure CD game ever."

Amiga Magazine also reviewed the game positively, but did not give a score. The magazine spoke about the "forgiving reaction time". The magazine also said that the game is well-tuned to the CDTV. The magazine complained that the mouse pointer was black which made it "impossible to see" during some scenes.
