= Earthlight (disambiguation) =

Earthlight is the partial illumination of the dark portion of the Moon's surface by light reflected from the Earth.

Earthlight may also refer to:

- Earthlight (novel), a 1955 novel by Arthur C. Clarke.
- Earthlight (novella), a 1951 story by Arthur C. Clarke, expanded into the 1955 novel
- Earthlight (crater), a small crater near the Apollo 15 landing site on the Moon, named for the novel
- Earthlight, a discontinued UK science fiction imprint of the publisher Simon & Schuster
- Earthlight (video game), a 1988 scrolling shooter published by Firebird
- Earthlight (horse), an Irish-bred, French-trained Thoroughbred racehorse

== See also ==
- Earthquake light, an unusual luminous aerial phenomenon that reportedly appears in the sky near areas of seismic activity
