= Jack the Ripper (1987 video game) =

- Publisher: CRL Group
- Designer: St. Bride's School
- Platforms: Amstrad CPC, Commodore 64, ZX Spectrum
- Release: 1987
- Genre: Text adventure
- Mode: Single-player

Jack the Ripper is a text adventure computer game designed by St. Bride's School and released by CRL in 1987 for the Commodore 64, Amstrad CPC and ZX Spectrum home computers. The game is based on the notorious "Jack the Ripper" murders in 1880s London.

== Plot ==
A murderer is roaming the East End of London and the police suspect you of being responsible. The player must clear their name by exposing the real culprit.

== Gameplay ==
The game is a standard text adventure with animated graphics in some locations to set the scene. The game accepts the input of full sentences including the use of adverbs. The game is played in real time; time passes when the player does not take action and events can take place in the game world during this time. As well as saving and loading the game state the program also allows players to store and restore their position during play.

== Reception ==
As with the earlier CRL adventures Dracula and Frankenstein, the game was classified by the British Board of Film Classification, receiving an '18' certificate for its gory graphics. Because of this W. H. Smith refused to stock the game.

=== Reviews ===
Sinclair User:

The first game ever to receive an "18" certificate. Very literate effort from St. Brides, with 'gore' added by CRL.

Zzap!64's reviewer said the game was similar in style to Rod Pike's work. They thought some of the graphics were unnecessary but the stylish text, atmosphere and excitement created made it "a must for the adventurers collection." It was given a 78% overall rating.

The Games Machine also compared the game to titles by Rod Pike. The reviewer admitted that none of the previous games by St Brides had impressed them very much, with this one being "the first of their games which has actually held my interest for more than 20 minutes." Overall it was said to be "professionally implemented and quite exciting to play" with the 3 parts of the game making it value for money. They also gave a rating of 78%.

Computer & Video games compared the game to Sherlock, with both games set in London in the same era and featuring 'real time' gameplay. They considered Jack the Ripper to be the superior game, as it lacked bugs. The reviewer said it was "certainly St Brides' best to date" and rated it 9/10.

== Notes ==
The game was produced using the Gilsoft Professional Adventure Writer.
