= Murder off Miami =

1986 video game

- Developer: Delta 4 Software
- Publisher: CRL Group
- Designers: Jason Somerville; Fergus McNeill
- Platforms: Amstrad CPC, Commodore 64, ZX Spectrum
- Release: 1987
- Genre: Interactive fiction

Murder off Miami is a 1987 whodunnit adventure video game based on the book of the same name by British thriller novelist Dennis Wheatley. Players take the role of Detective Officer Kettering, who is inspecting the supposed suicide of a British financier on a cruise ship in the waters near Miami. His job is to unravel the mystery.

== Gameplay ==
Players progress by collecting clues, interrogating people, and interacting with the environment. The interface is largely text-based, with occasional images to set the scene. Commands are given to complete actions. Gameplay is split into three parts which represent the three days of investigation.

== Development ==
The game was co-written by Fergus McNeill, who had previously authored The Hobbit and Lord of the Rings parody games The Boggit and Bored of the Rings. It is based on a 1936 book of the same name by Dennis Wheatley, which was presented as a crime dossier containing letters, photographs, and physical clues such as a blood-stained curtain and cigarette butts. The reader was meant to analyze the information and determine who committed the murder, checking their answer against the solution provided in a sealed envelope with the book.

There was a fatal bug in the first batch of Spectrum units, resulting in the game restarting each time the player tried to get out of their chair at the beginning of the game.

== Reception ==
Reception

Review scores
Publication	Score
ZZap!64	81%
Aktueller Software Markt	8/10
Computer Gamer	60%
Your Commodore	7/10
Commodore User	2/5 stars

A review in Sinclair User gave the game four out of five stars, praising the plot but noting some infelicities in the writing. Meanwhile, ZX Computing's review was cut short due to the bug, but the reviewer was impressed with what they experienced and looked forward to reviewing it again the following month.
