= Inishfree =

Small island group off Donegal, Ireland

Inishfree Upper
Native name: Inis Fraoigh
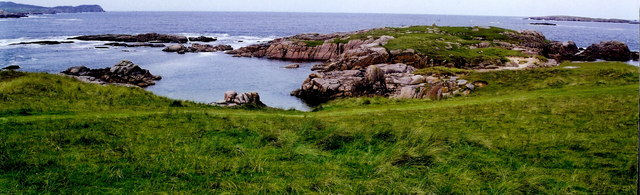
- Inishfree Bay, seen from the island

- Location within island of Ireland
- Etymology: transl. Heather Island

Geography
- Location: Atlantic Ocean
- Coordinates: 54°57′18″N 8°26′41″W
- Area: 0.6 sq mi (1.6 km^{2})

Administration
- Ireland
- Province: Ulster
- County: Donegal

Demographics
- Population: 0 (2013)

Inishfree (Irish: Inis Fraoigh, transl. 'island of heather') refers to two small islands off the coast of County Donegal in the north of Ireland. Inishfree Upper is the larger of the two at around 0.6 square miles (1.6 km^{2}). It is often known simply as "Inishfree".

== Inishfree Upper ==
In the 4th or 5th century, Inishfree Upper was reputedly controlled by Niall of the Nine Hostages, future High King of Ireland. Later, the late medieval period, saw Inishfree as a possession of the descendants of Niall of the Nines Hostages, namely the clan of Red Hugh O'Donnell, the leader of the last stand of the Ulster chieftains against the English.

In the early 20th century there were 36 families living on the island. Séamus Ó Grianna and Peadar O'Donnell each taught at the school there. Peadar O'Donnell was at one point the schoolmaster.

In September 1978, the Argentine musician Guillermo Cazenave was living on the island, where he recorded his album Inishfree. In 1980, the Atlantis commune moved to cottages on Inishfree from Burtonport, where they had set up in 1974. The commune were known as The Screamers for their practice of primal therapy, and subsequently moved near to Icononzo in Colombia in 1989.

The last permanent resident of Inishfree Upper was Barry Pilcher who had moved there in 1993 from Essex and to where he returned in 2013. Because of the possibility that bad weather would stop the votes being counted, Pilcher and residents of nearby islands were the first in Ireland to vote on the Treaty of Lisbon in 2009. There are still holiday homes in use on the island. In 2016, two people voted in the Irish general election on Inishfree, both of whom had moved to live primarily in Burtonport.

== Inishfree Lower ==
Inishfree Lower is the smaller of the two islands. It was home to one family until the 1960s or 1970s.
