= Pilgrim (video game) =

1986 video game

- Cover art
- Developer: CRL
- Publisher: CRL
- Designer: Rod Pike
- Engine: The Quill
- Platform: Commodore 64
- Release: 1986
- Genre: Text adventure
- Mode: Single-player

Pilgrim is a text adventure game by CRL that runs on the Commodore 64 computer.

== Plot ==
After facing a massacre at the wrath of the Silvian army, the player character goes on quest around the land of Meridan to revive the Guardian in order to save the land from the Silvian's carnage.

== Gameplay ==
Most of the text in the screen describe the current whereabouts and situation of the player. The player needs to type in a set of text commands to interact with the location and progress with the quest.

== Reception ==
Reception

Review scores
Publication	Score
Computer and Video Games	7.6/10
Your Computer	5/5
Computer Gamer	4/5
Zzap!64	58%
