= Thunder Cross =

Thunder Cross may refer to:

- Thunder Cross (Latvian: pērkonkrusts), the swastika in Latvian contexts
- Pērkonkrusts, a Latvian fascist organisation led by Gustavs Celmiņš, sometimes referred to in English as the Thunder Cross
- Thunder Cross (video game), a 1988 scrolling shoot 'em up arcade game
- Thundercross, a different 1988 scrolling shoot 'em up video game
- Rhapsody of Fire, formerly Thundercross, an Italian power metal band
