= To Hell and Back (video game) =

1988 video game

- Developer(s): Andy Jervis
- Publisher(s): CRL
- Platform(s): Commodore 64
- Release: 1988
- Genre(s): Platform
- Mode(s): Single player

To Hell and Back is a platform game developed for the Commodore 64 by Andy Jervis and published by CRL in 1988. Jervis' first game Moon Crystals was also included, although this was unmentioned in the game's packaging or press releases.

== Plot ==
The player is cast as Archangel Bertram who is trying to gain access to the Underworld by traveling around the Netherworld to retrieve the Ten Commandments stolen by Mephisto. Bertram starts his journey outside of the gates of Hell and must go deeper and deeper into the depths in order to confront Mephisto and destroy him.

== Gameplay ==
Bertram will be challenged by ghosts, zombies, and skeletons throughout the graveyard and the Netherworld. In this platform and maze game the screen will scroll as the player moves. The player must shoot various enemies with Archangel Bertram's halo and jump pits of spikes and lava over various levels. If the player was to touch an enemy the enemy will drain some of Bertram's energy. If Bertram comes into contact with spikes or lava or his energy reaches zero the player loses one of 8 lives. Occasionally the player will come across a bible which can restore some energy. At the end of each level is a boss which must be defeated in order to receive one of the Commandments back. As well as the main playing area the player can also see their score, lives, commandments collected and lives. A joystick is used to control Archangel Bertram.
