= Bugsy (video game) =

1986 video game

- ZX Spectrum cover
- Developer: St. Bride's School
- Publisher: CRL Group
- Designer: Priscilla Langridge
- Engine: The Quill
- Platforms: Commodore 64, Amstrad CPC, ZX Spectrum
- Release: EU: 1986
- Genre: Adventure
- Mode: Single player

Bugsy, also known as The King of Chicago, is a 1986 graphic adventure game for the Commodore 64, Amstrad CPC, and ZX Spectrum developed by St. Bride's School and published by CRL Group exclusively in Europe. Its protagonist, Bugsy Maroon, is a rabbit gangster in 1922 Chicago.

== Gameplay ==
The objective of the game is to be a successful criminal. While primarily text-based, it features simple graphics depicting the current scene. The controls are of a typical text-based game, having players type in commands in order to interact with the environment and characters. When interacting with characters, players have the option to greet, buy, bribe, hire, insult, protect, sweet-talk, or threaten them.

Reception

Review scores
Publication	Score
Amtix	41%
Crash	84%
Computer and Video Games	30/40
Sinclair User	5/5
Zzap!64	56%
