= Silver Sisterhood =

Religious community and video game developer

- Formation: September 1982
- Dissolved: 1992
- Type: New religious movement
- Purpose: Worship of a feminine Supreme Deity; matriarchal community
- Location(s): Originally Burtonport, County Donegal, Ireland; later Oxford, England and Whipps Cross, London, England
- Members: 7 (initial, 1982)
- Key people: Miss Martindale

Members of St. Bride's school during an appearance on The Late Late Show in 1988

The Silver Sisterhood was a new religious movement that was active in Burtonport, County Donegal, Ireland from 1982 to 1992. The group was also referred to as the Rhennes or Rhennish community before 1983 and St. Bride's School afterwards. English writer Miss Martindale (later the public face of Aristasia) was a prominent member. Under the St Bride's name, the community is known for creating early text adventure video games such as The Snow Queen and Jack the Ripper.

== Rhennish community ==
The Silver Sisterhood came to Burtonport from Yorkshire in September 1982 and occupied a large house that had previously been the home of the Atlantis commune (often referred to as the Screamers). They christened the house An Droichead Beo, meaning 'The Bridge of Life'. There were initially seven members.

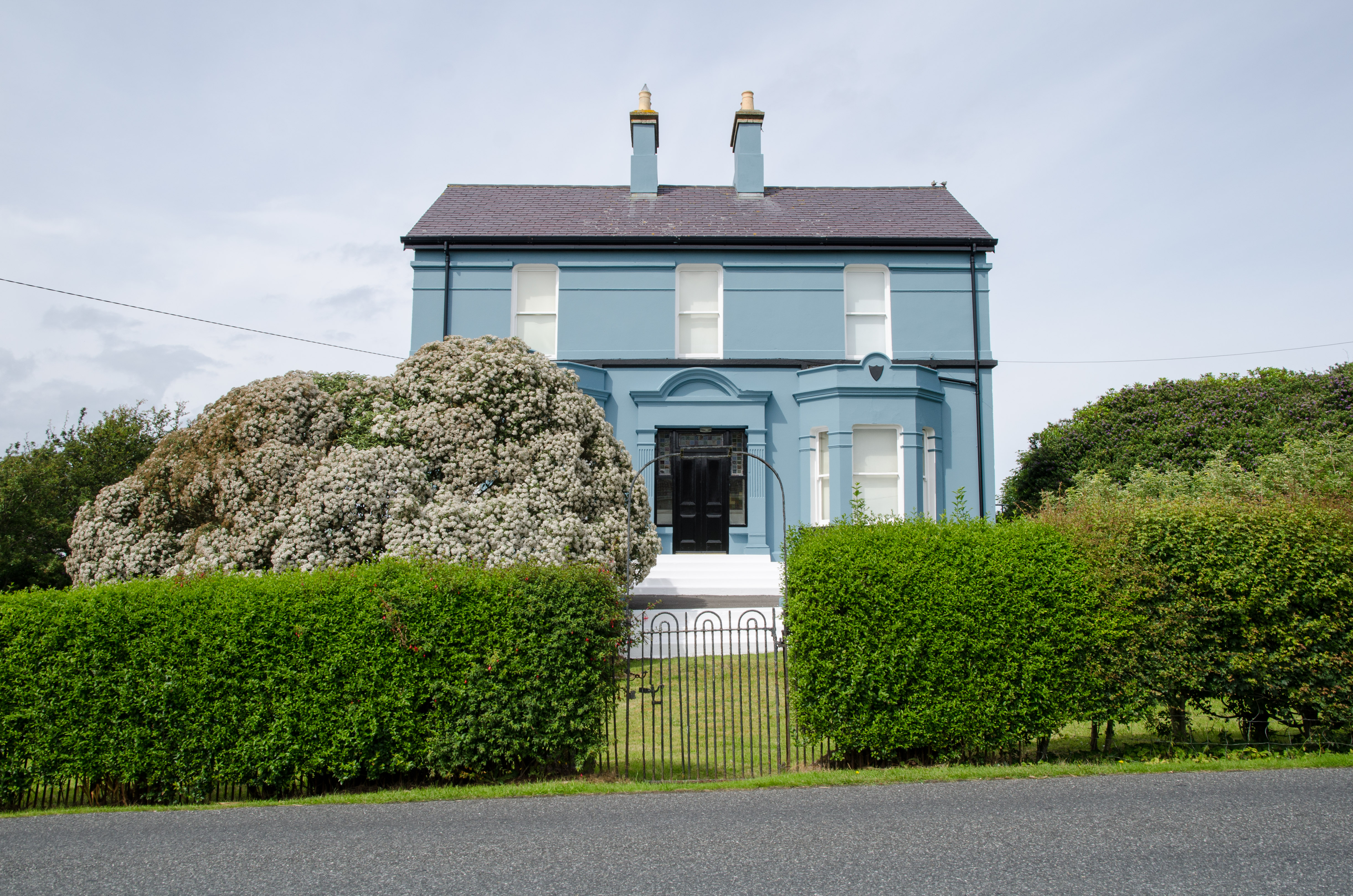
A 2017 photograph of the house the Sisterhood occupied in Burtonport, County Donegal during the 1980s.

The Sisterhood believed in a feminine Supreme Deity. They worshipped God as the Mother and claimed that everything they did centred around the worship of her. Music and chanting had great importance as acts of devotion. The musical instruments used by the group were all handmade by themselves. They stressed a great emphasis on craft as a path to the sacred. There was also an emphasis on self-sufficiency and the members grew food to feed themselves and sell. Members fasted on Fridays by skipping breakfast and lunch. They operated a tearoom in the house which served the town. No electricity or modern appliances were used by the group initially and plastic was shunned as a pollutant. Female members wore full-length dresses, covered their heads in public, and referred to themselves as 'maids'.

The Rhennish community was matriarchal. The group claimed to be following a matriarchal structure that was the norm in western Europe in ancient times. Patriarchy was described as a recent and unusual development that would soon die out and be replaced by a matriarchal golden age. Men could become members. One man was part of the original group that came to Burtonport in 1982. However, he had left by July 1983. In an interview for RTÉ, a member expressed hope that men would come to live in the community long-term but acknowledged that it was difficult to attract them. The community was also hierarchical in nature. Equality was claimed to be a patriarchal concept that stopped people from working together. In an interview for WomanSpirit magazine, the view was expressed by one member that there are always leaders in a group whether acknowledged or not and that "some maids like to tell others what to do and some maids like to be told what to do".

== St. Bride's ==
Later in the 1980s, members began to wear full Victorian-era outfits on a regular basis and to style themselves as Romantics. In 1984, the house was re-christened as St. Bride's, after the 5th-century Irish abbess and miracle worker Brigid of Kildare. Visitors to St. Bride's were offered various courses including peat cutting and the experience of attending a Victorian boarding school. The school was advertised in various publications including The Observer, The Sunday Times, Girl About Town, and the theatre programme of the play Daisy Pulls It Off. The Daily Telegraph writer Candida Crewe likened the house to a Gothic novel where "a single candle flickered behind a lace curtain, guests were invited into a parlour heated only by a feeble coal fire, and the mistress of the house greeted her guests wearing a long black dress and white lace collar". The prospectus offered courses in mathematics, elementary Latin, grammar, and literature. Traditional school artefacts such as desks, slates, uniforms, and canes were included in the setting. Two women, including Miss Martindale, ran the group in this phase. In 1990 Miss Martindale was convicted of assaulting one of her clients and was handed a £100 fine and a two-month suspended sentence. The assault was by caning on the buttocks, which Martindale claimed was consensual.

In line with their espoused Victorian values, anti-modern and elitist views were expressed by St. Bride's in the Victorian phase. Miss Martindale stated that "some people are meant to rule and others to serve". The group was involved in the anti-metric system campaign "Don't Give an Inch". In a 1988 appearance on The Late Late Show, the two leaders of St. Bride's said that they adopted Victorian dress because they liked it and it was their way of being creative. Discipline and corporal punishment, including caning, were part of the experience and achieved a greater prominence in later years. This was to an extent that the group has been called a fetish club.

To raise money, St. Bride's also sold handmade costumes and jewellery, and published books and magazines. They also created eight text adventure video games. Although television was shunned, computer games were favored as they involved "concentration and commitment". The Secret of St. Bride's, a time travel adventure set in the school itself, was the first game they created, followed by The Snow Queen, based on the Hans Christian Andersen fairy tale; The Very Big Cave Adventure, a parody of Colossal Cave Adventure that also includes sequences parodying Alice in Wonderland and Batman; Bugsy, set in Prohibition-era Chicago and starring a gangster rabbit; and Jack the Ripper, set in 1888 London and a mystical otherland. A departure from St. Bride's earlier light-hearted adventures, Jack the Ripper was the first video game to receive an "18" rating, mainly on the basis of illustrations supplied by the publisher, CRL. The examiner described the script as "more fairy tale than macabre horror". The final three games were more traditional fantasies and were released in 1991 by GI Games.

The group left Burtonport in 1992, relocating to Oxford and then Whipps Cross in London. Far-right and antisemitic publications were found in the house after they left. This included a two-year correspondence with John Tyndall, then leader of the British National Party, who expressed his admiration for what the St. Bride's group were doing. One former member denied in an interview with The Daily Telegraph that they had far-right leanings. In addition to this, large quantities of sadomasochistic fetish magazines were found at the property, alongside "caning recommendation" forms which, according to The Sunday Telegraph, indicated regular beatings were occurring at St Bride's.

Members of the community used numerous different pseudonyms throughout their time in Burtonport and afterwards, which created confusion among those writing about the group.

== Video game releases ==
- The Secret of St. Bride's – 1985
- The Snow Queen – 1985
- The Very Big Cave Adventure – 1986
- Bugsy – 1986
- Jack the Ripper – 1987
- The White Feather Cloak – 1991
- The Dogboy – 1985
- Silverwolf – 1991
- 2011 or Wondergirl – never released
