= Icononzo =

Coordinates: 4°11′N 74°32′W

- Municipality and town
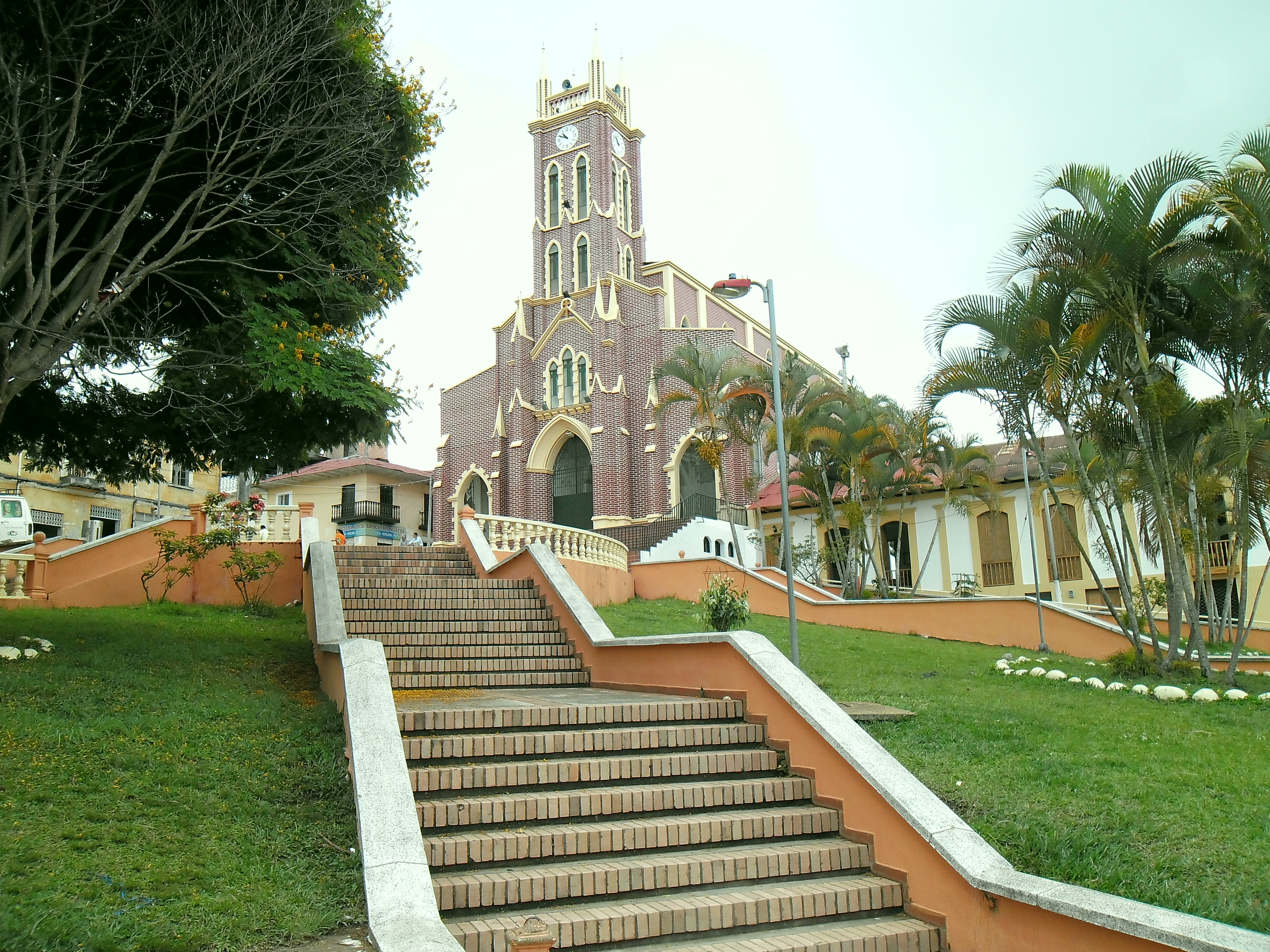

- Flag Coat of arms

- Location of the municipality and town of Icononzo in the Tolima Department of Colombia.
- Country: Colombia
- Department: Tolima Department

Government
  - Mayor: Hugo Jiménez Quinche

Area
  - Total: 232 km^{2} (90 sq mi)
- Elevation: 1,304 m (4,278 ft)

Population (2017)
  - Total: 10,801
  - Density: 46.6/km^{2} (121/sq mi)
- Time zone: UTC-5 (Colombia Standard Time)

Icononzo (Spanish pronunciation: [ikoˈnonso]) is a municipality located in the Tolima Department in Colombia.

== Climate ==
The average temperature is 21 °C.

== History ==
In 1875, the community of Guamitos was inherited by Don Vicente Reyes Daza.

During the colonial era and by the year 1888, Adrian Lords Escobar, Guillermo Quijano, Alberto Williamson and others arrived and created a small community along the road leading to Guamitos. By Ordinance No. 3 of July 16, 1888, it was instituted as "Corregimiento Icononzo".

By 1892, Reyes Daza and Williamson began the assembly of the estates Canada and Scotland. Labor supply in the region was worsened by housing shortages. This situation led the ranch owners to donate land to address the problem, beginning the construction of 17 new homes. This resulted in the formation of a new town, which, because of their increasing wealth and development, was upgraded to a municipality by Ordinance No. 1915 of April 21, after it was returned to the department of Tolima in territories under the jurisdiction of Cundinamarca.

Icononzo is known for a natural bridge over a deep canyon used in the civil turmoil known as La Violencia following the Bogotazo. The arch was painted by the Italian painter Gerolamo Fumagalli in the 19th century.

In 1989, the Atlantis commune, founded in Burtonport, Ireland, by Jenny James, relocated near to Icononzo.
