= Death or Glory (video game) =

1987 scrolling shooter video game

- Developer: Wise Owl Software
- Publisher: CRL Group
- Platforms: Commodore 16, Plus/4, Commodore 64, ZX Spectrum, Amstrad CPC
- Release: 1987
- Genre: Scrolling shooter

Death or Glory is a multidirectional scrolling shooter developed by Wise Owl Software and published by CRL Group in 1987 for the Commodore 64, Commodore 16, Plus/4, ZX Spectrum, and Amstrad CPC. The player pilots a spaceship and encounters an alien invasion that they then have to defeat. The game received average to negative reviews.

== Gameplay ==
The player pilots a "spacedozer" destroying empty space stations, and asteroids from space highways. The player is given work orders to investigate a remote location that turns out to be an alien invasion. The player is forced to engage the fleet before it arrives at their home island planet of New Stratford.

The player pilots a spacedozer that they use to destroy individual alien ships or pieces of alien mothership. The player can use the fire button to drop bombs and rip through the mothership's hull or ram enemy ships to destroy them.

== Reception ==
Sinclair User gave Death or Glory 6/10 and called it fun but lacking any stand-out features, describing it as "nothing really to complain about". The reviewer noted original theme, good graphics and controls. Commodore Computing International rated the game "crisp" and acknowledged that the game wasn't "half bad". They noted graphics and gameplay as stronger points. Your Sinclair gave the game 4/10 and advised readers to avoid the game. Zzap64! rated the game at 37%, calling it an "average attempt" and giving particularly low scores to lastability and value. They described it as decently presented, however with repetitive and uninteresting gameplay. Aktueller Software Markt gave the game's demo version's graphics and sound 8/10, and noted it for decent gameplay. They remarked that CLR had produced better games. In a review of Alien Destruction Set, Ahoy! describe the graphics as nice and gameplay as entertaining. Reviewers noted lack of instructions and feedback for using the attack button to damage the mothership. Reviewers also noted game's over-hyped promotional material, which did not translate to gameplay.
