= The Town with No Name =

1992 video game

- Cover artwork
- Developer: Delta 4
- Publisher: On-Line Entertainment
- Director: Fergus McNeill
- Producer: Clement Chambers
- Composer: Fergus McNeill (credited as "The Jester")
- Platforms: CDTV, MS-DOS
- Release: 1992: CDTV; 1993: MS-DOS
- Genres: Action-adventure, point-and-click

The Town with No Name, also published as Town with No Name, is a Western action-adventure point-and-click video game developed by Delta 4 in 1992 for the Commodore CDTV; a version for MS-DOS was released in 1993. It follows an unnamed drifter who comes into conflict with an outlaw gang after arriving in the titular town and must duel with the individual gang members in quick-time events to survive.

The Town with No Name received generally negative reviews upon release. In retrospective reviews, it was noted for its surreal humour and perceived lack of content.

== Plot ==
In the American frontier, a drifter with a John Wayne-esque voice referred to as "the Man with No Name" gets off a train at the station outside the Town with No Name. Upon entering the town, he is confronted by a gunman. Once No Name kills him, an unnamed man with a cigarette reveals that the attacker was the youngest brother of Evil Eb, the leader of the Hole-in-the-Head Gang, and hints that Eb will send his bandits after No Name. No Name then explores each of the town's buildings, either by interacting with the residents or by playing minigames, and duels with gang members usually after leaving the buildings.

After killing every outlaw except Evil Eb, No Name confronts Eb himself but only shoots off his hat. Eb, having dropped his gun in surprise and resigning to his defeat, asks No Name to kill him, believing he is a man called Billy-Bob, whom he had earlier challenged to a duel. No Name explains that he is not Billy-Bob and came to town to meet his sister, believing he is in a town called Dodge Gulch. Eb tells him in turn that Dodge Gulch is at another train station 20 miles away. No Name spares Eb because of their mutual misunderstanding, and they go into the saloon for whiskey.

If the player chooses to leave town via train at any point prior to No Name's encounter with the bandit "Wildcard" Willy McVee in the saloon, an alternate ending will take place. As the train departs, a small boy yells, "Come back, Shane!", prompting No Name to shoot the child and reply, "My name's not Shane, kid!", after which the train flies off into outer space.

== Gameplay ==
Gameplay of The Town with No Name: The "Where Now?" menu with eight selectable places (left) the quick-time event of Nasty Ned during a duel (right)

The gameplay is divided into two main forms: a point-and-click format with menus containing multiple options, followed by short animated scenes based on the player's selections; and a light gun-type interface where the player must quickly shoot a target before the target shoots back, ending in defeat. Minigames include three-card monte, Chase the Ace, and a quick time event where the player must click a moving drink that the bartender in the saloon slides towards No Name so he can catch it.

The duels with the gang members are typically triggered by entering and leaving buildings. However, the order in which the buildings are entered and the activities that can be done in each have no effect on when, or in which order, the bandits appear; the player can simply enter and leave any combination of buildings and fight the bandits in the same sequence. The exception after killing some of the bandits in the street is the required encounter with "Wildcard" Willy McVee in the saloon; any subsequent attempts to leave will trigger the last few duels, culminating in the showdown with Evil Eb. The one optional duel involves Immortal Isaac, a knife-thrower concealed in shadows in an upstairs room in the saloon. When bandits are killed, their wanted posters in the jailhouse are marked with red X's, with the exception of Isaac, whose poster is marked with a question mark. If the player dies at any point, they must restart from the beginning.

== Development ==
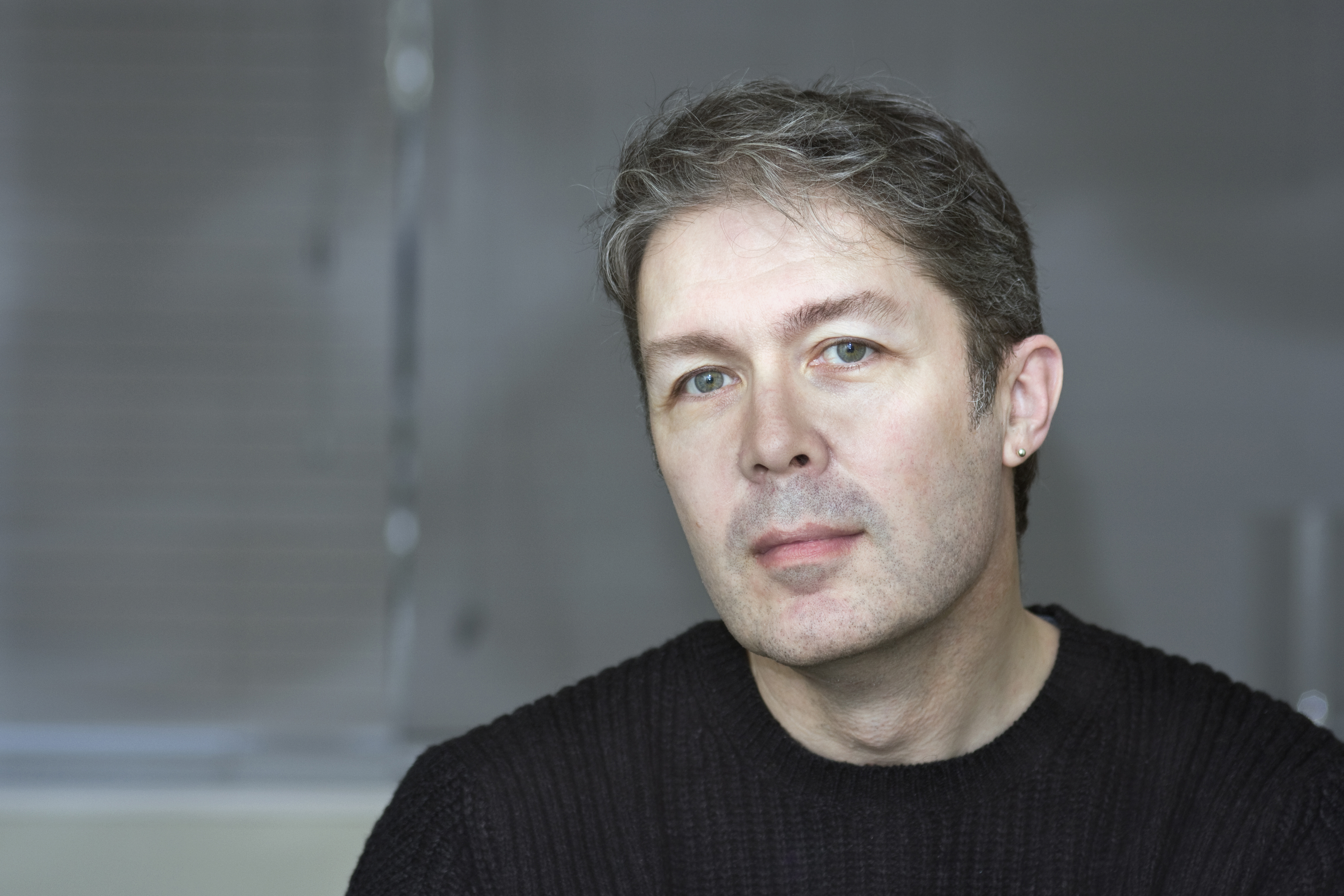
Director of The Town with No Name, Fergus McNeill in 2017.

The Town with No Name was conceived by Fergus McNeill, who came up with the idea when he saw a friend wearing a pair of cowboy boots. "My mind was turned towards the whole genre of Spaghetti Western", he explained. "It was begging for me to do something with it."

According to the Making of The Town with No Name short included in the game's bonus features, main antagonist Evil Eb was originally named "Three-Gun Theo" and had an extra hand, enabling him to carry three pistols at once. In a 2021 tweet, McNeill confirmed that he was the composer of The Town with No Name, credited as "The Jester".

== Reception ==
Reception

Review scores
Publication	Score
Amiga Format	35%
GameZone	D+
Tilt	43/60 (Note: Tilt rated it 13/20 for graphics, 14/20 for animation, and 16/20 for soundtrack.)
Amiga Joker	52%
PC Review	3/10

The Town with No Name had a mostly negative critical reception. Critics highlighted its lack of longevity and its poor 3D animations. Dave Winder of Amiga Computing was more positive, stating that it is "let down by its lack of real lasting gameplay, but the interactive elements and the fact that there is so much humour and so many hidden sequences lift it above being just another game."

Retrospective reviews of The Town with No Name noted its surreal humour and perceived lack of content; while Tanner Fox of Game Rant did speculate on the developer's intentions, he otherwise opined how it was hard to tell if Delta 4 deliberately conceived it as a parody or not. Time Extension called it "Hypnotically Awful". Since then, The Town with No Name has become subject of internet memes online, due to its humorous quick-time events such as the bartender drink quick time event, as well as its cutscenes such as the alternate ending.
