= Atlantis (commune) =

Commune in Ireland

Coordinates: 54.984834325826654°N 8.435366733381771°W

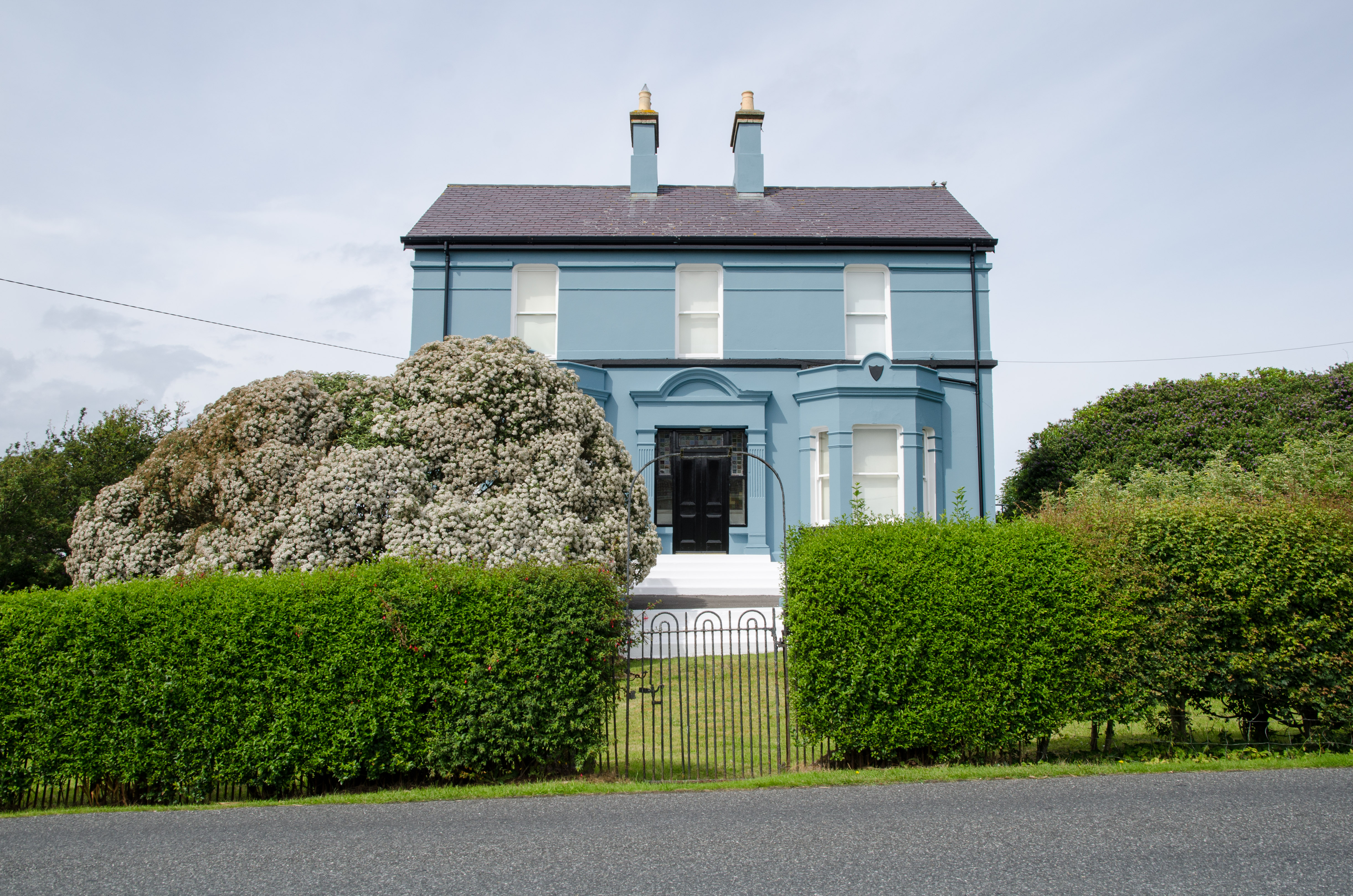
A 2017 photograph of the house the commune occupied in Burtonport, County Donegal during the 1970s.

The Atlantis Primal Therapy Commune, or The Atlantis Foundation, is a commune established in Ireland in 1974. It is also known as The Screamers because of their practice of primal scream therapy. The commune moved to Colombia in 1989, where they increasingly focused on ecological concerns. Two of its members, one a grandson of the founder, were killed by Revolutionary Armed Forces of Colombia (FARC) rebels in 2000.

== History ==
Englishwoman Jenny James (born 1942) established The Atlantis Commune in a three-storey house in Burtonport, a village in The Rosses district in the west of County Donegal, in 1974, moving there from another primal commune in London. The name 'Atlantis' came from Burtonport's location on the Atlantic coast and from the legend of Atlantis. At any one time, around thirty people lived in the commune in "Atlantis House", which was brightly decorated, with eyes around the windows and symbols on the walls.

The group's way of life raised objections and accusations of abuse. They received bomb threats, and some members of Dáil Éireann – the lower house of the Oireachtas, the Republic of Ireland's parliament – called for them to be deported.

In 1980, the commune relocated to cottages on the island of Inishfree, just off the west coast of County Donegal. After a split and two years of traveling, James relocated the commune again in 1989, this time to Colombia, moving to near the town of Icononzo in Tolima, where membership peaked at around sixty during the 1990s. James had intended to move to Bolivia, inspired by Che Guevara, but settled on Colombia instead. Inishfree has been uninhabited since 2013. After they left Burtonport, the house they used was occupied by a different religious group, the Silver Sisterhood, whom Atlantis had a dispute with over rent in 1992.

In 1999, a group of Atlantis members who had moved to Caquetá were expelled by the Revolutionary Armed Forces of Colombia (FARC), with whom Atlantis had previously co-existed peacefully, followed by the original group near Icononzo. James, with a 15-year-old daughter and an 18-year-old grandson, Tristan, moved to Pacho.

In 2000, Tristan James travelled with another Atlantis member, Javier Nova, aged 18, back to the town of Icononzo. James was planning a gap year in Ireland and wanted to see his half-brother who was being fostered in the village of Hoya Grande, located down the mountain from the commune's farm, before he left. Both were warned against returning, and Javier Leto was reluctant to do so, but Tristan trusted the assurances he had been given by another commune member, Anne Barr, and they continued to the village. FARC rebels caught them when they left the half-brother's house and they were murdered after a show trial, and their bodies burned. Some of their bones were returned to the family a year later; the local FARC commander who had led the murderers was promoted.

At the time of the murders, some other members of Atlantis were living on a moored ketch in Baltimore, County Cork, called the Atlantis Adventure. Tristan James's mother, Rebecca Garcia, had been estranged from the commune but returned to it after the murders.

== Lifestyle ==
The members of Atlantis were known as The Screamers by locals in Burtonport for their practice of primal therapy. The idea of primal screaming was developed and popularised by Arthur Janov, especially in his 1970 book The Primal Scream, the goal being to expunge and prevent repressed emotion. Janov's theory focuses on repressed childhood pain. At Atlantis this was extended to a general, radical emotional honesty, where members would yell at one another. Parts of this approach, which James viewed as therapeutic, also derived from the ideas of Wilhelm Reich. James was a client of Reichian psychotherapist David Boadella in London before moving to Ireland and Boadella's poems and letters to James feature in her first book, Room to Breathe.

In an interview for RTÉ show The Live Mike, James claimed that the aggression of this approach was both helpful and healthy, and a counterpoint to a society that "puts a premium on mediocrity and niceness, and being sweet and being polite". The hostility of the sessions could be intense, with members of the commune pushing one another into being ever more harassing and angry towards one another.

On Inishfree and in Colombia, Atlantis focused also on self-sufficiency. In Colombia, they established an organic farm and focused increasingly on ecological issues. In an interview in 2002, James stated Atlantis's goals as "self-sufficiency, to show ourselves and everyone else that life is possible without technology, without damaging and raping the planet" and stressed the importance of physical labour, saying that "therapy, sexual freedom for children, no school, political involvement, all flow organically from this basic premise".

The members of the commune have also practised non-monogamy and "free love". The "sexual freedom for children" was elaborated on by James in an interview with The Independent in 2000, where she is quoted as saying: "We don't set an age at which a child is a sexual creature. If they want to sleep with each other at nine or 10, that's fine".

== Atlantis books ==
In the 1970s and 1980s, Jenny James wrote several books about Atlantis and her ideas:

- Room to Breathe (with letters and poems by David Boadella). Coventure. 1975. ISBN 978-0904576023. 323 p.
- They Call Us The Screamers: The history of Atlantis Primal Therapy Commune, Burtonport, Co. Donegal. Caliban. 1980. ISBN 978-0904573275. 184 p.
- Atlantis Alive: love letters from a primal commune. Caliban. c. 1980. ISBN 978-0904573305. 173 p.
- Atlantis is.... Caliban. c. 1980. ISBN 978-0904573268. 132 p.
- Atlantis Magic. Caliban. 1982. ISBN 9780904573589. 262 p.
- Atlantis Inishfree. Caliban. 1985. ISBN 978-1850660033. 248 p.
- Male Sexuality: The Atlantis position. Caliban. 1985. ISBN 978-0904573565. 259 p. (Note: By "Jenny James, with contributions from her sister, Snowy, the men of Atlantis Commune and Jeremy Ward, a poet")

Two later e-books have since been produced:

- Atlantis Adventure. The story of James's travels from March 1987 (the Canary Islands) to June 1989 (Colombia) Atlantis Adventure (Diary). 241 p.
- The Atlantis Handbook of Sex Techniques. (Note: In full, "The Atlantis Handbook of Sex Techniques for the Heterosexual Female (All you ever knew about sex but were afraid to mention)")

== In culture ==
A documentary about the commune, The Family, was made for RTÉ in 1978 by Bob Quinn, as part of "The Other Lives" sequence of films about alternative lifestyles. The film was considered too disturbing for broadcast, and was not shown on television until the 1990s.

The 2017 TULCA Festival of Visual Art in Galway took the Atlantis commune as its theme, and its name, "They Call Us The Screamers", from James' 1980 book. The festival included a screening of The Family and thirteen newly-commissioned artworks. The choice to take Atlantis as inspiration caused controversy and the curator, Matt Packer, had to clarify that: "The exhibition does not seek to promote or advocate the Atlantis commune" because "news of the exhibition has nevertheless caused concern and anxiety to some former members that are still affected by their experiences".

The 31 July 2018 episode of Seriously... on BBC Radio 4, "The Silence and the Scream", told the story of Atlantis's time in County Donegal. It is presented by Garrett Carr, who grew up in County Donegal, and includes his interviews with locals who remember the commune's time there.

In 2020, the BBC World Service broadcast "The Downfall of the Screamers", a documentary by Faye Planer, who had spent a week living with Jenny James and her daughter Becky in their present farm in southern Colombia. One other member of the commune still lives close by, but "They are not on speaking terms, so she's quite alone now, compared to her communal days", says the presenter.

== See also ==
- Vegetotherapy
- Counterculture of the 1960s
- Silver Sisterhood - occupied the same premises as the Atlantis commune after the commune left Burtonport
