= Pete Cooke =

British computer game designer (born 1956)

Pete Cooke (born 1956) is a British computer games programmer, best known for his work in the 1980s for the ZX Spectrum.

== Style ==
Cooke's software often used a point and click GUI. As most Spectrum users did not own a mouse, the pointer was manipulated by keyboard or joystick.

Cooke's game Tau Ceti featured a form of solid 3D graphics and was set on a planet with day and night cycles with dynamically drawn shadows. Micronaut One, released in 1987, was set inside futuristic biocomputers with the player controlling a microscopic craft attempting to clear the tunnels of an insect-like life form called Scrim. This game used fast-moving 3D graphics and featured an enemy that went through a realistic though accelerated lifecycle, beginning each level as eggs and progressing to larvae and eventually adult Scrim which would then lay more eggs.

As well as these games, Cooke programmed the ZX Spectrum and Amstrad CPC versions of Stunt Car Racer and also released a game for the 16-bit Amiga and Atari ST in 1990 called Tower of Babel.

He worked at Leicester College as an IT lecturer, teaching students how to create computer games using Microsoft XNA. He has created and released games for Apple Devices (iOS), including Zenfit and Everything Must Go.

== Games ==
- Invincible Island (1983)
- The Inferno (1984)
- Urban Upstart (1984)
- UDG Generator (1984)
- Maze Chase (1984)
- Upper Gumtree (1985)
- Ski Star 2000 (1985)
- Juggernaut (1985)
- Tau Ceti (1985)
- Room 10 (1986)
- Academy (1986)
- Micronaut One (1987)
- Brainstorm (1987)
- Earthlight (1988)
- Zolyx (1988)
- A Whole New Ball Game (1989)
- Stunt Car Racer – ZX Spectrum conversion of Geoff Crammond's game (1989)
- Granny's Garden (1989)
- Tower Of Babel (1990)
- Grand Prix (1992)
- Grand Prix 2 (1996)
- Grand Prix 3 (2000)
- Zenfit (iOS) (2012)
- Everything Must Go (iOS) (2013)
