= Mindfighter =

1988 video game

- Commodore 64 cover art by Mark Wilkinson
- Developer: Abstract Concepts
- Publisher: Activision
- Designers: Anna Popkess; Fergus McNeill; Cover art Mark Wilkinson
- Platforms: Amiga, Amstrad CPC, Amstrad PCW, Atari ST, Commodore 64, MS-DOS, ZX Spectrum.
- Release: 1988
- Genre: Interactive fiction
- Mode: Single-player

Mindfighter is a text adventure game developed by British studio Abstract Concepts and published by Activision in 1988 for the Amiga, Commodore 64, Amstrad CPC, Amstrad PCW, Atari ST, MS-DOS, and the ZX Spectrum computers.

== Plot ==
The premise of the game is a prophecy by Nostradamus that at the end of the 20th century there would be a major world war, beginning somewhere in the Middle East. The game was produced at a time of escalating violence in the Persian Gulf due to the Iran–Iraq War.

The year is 1988 and Robin, an 11-year-old boy with unusual psychic powers, has awoken from a long sleep among the ruins of his former home in Southampton, which has been devastated by a nuclear war. The last thing he remembers is falling asleep as normal in his room. His family and friends are missing and Britain has become an ultra-rightist state.

In reality, Robin is living in 1987 and this is a vision of the future. Robin has fallen into a trance from which he cannot wake. He must somehow discover the causes of the disaster that will befall the world, and awake to warn his contemporaries of their possible fate.

== Gameplay ==
The game is a text adventure with basic graphics to set the scene. The package includes a 160-page book, Mindfighter by Anna Popkess, which lays out the background of the story, and provides hints for play. The player must guide Robin through the hazardous environment of post-apocalyptic Southampton, surviving famine, desperate mobs, radiation sickness, and the violent agents of "The System", the dictatorial government which now governs Britain. Robin must survive and somehow prevent the war from happening.

== Reviews ==
- Your Sinclair: "It's a golden age for Spectrum adventuring..."
- Sinclair User: "An intriguing story. May send shivers down your spine!"
