= Bored of the Rings (video game) =

1985 video game

- Cover art by Phil Gascoine
- Developer: Delta 4
- Publisher: Delta 4, CRL Group
- Designer: Fergus McNeill
- Platforms: Amstrad CPC, Commodore 64, ZX Spectrum, BBC Micro
- Release: 1985
- Genre: Text adventure game
- Mode: Single-player

Bored of the Rings is a text adventure game released by Delta 4 in 1985 for several computer systems written using The Quill. It was later published by CRL Group on its sister label Silversoft. The game is inspired by, but not based on, the Bored of the Rings parody novel published by Harvard Lampoon. The earlier game The Hobbit is also parodied. It was followed by a prequel in the same spirit, The Boggit.

== Plot ==
Fordo the Boggit, Spam, Pimply and Murky must take the Great Ring to Mount Gloom.

== Gameplay ==
The game is a standard text adventure with static background graphics in some locations. It accepts verb / noun commands and also short sentence inputs. It was split into three parts with parts two and three requiring password input to access.

== Reception ==
Reception

Award
Publication	Award
Sinclair User	SU Classic

Zzap!64 thought the game was extremely funny but somewhat limited in terms of gameplay. It was given an overall rating of 78%.

== See also ==
- Kingdom O' Magic, another fantasy parody game by the same designer
