= The Secret of St. Brides =

1985 video game

- Developer: St. Brides School
- Platforms: Commodore 64, ZX Spectrum
- Release: 1985
- Genre: Adventure
- Mode: Single-player

The Secret of St. Brides is a 1985 adventure video game published by St. Brides School.

== Background ==
The game was developed by the St. Brides community in County Donegal, Ireland. The game takes place within a fictionalized version of St. Brides School. It was developed using The Quill and Illustrator software.

== Plot ==
Players play as Trixie Trinian, a schoolgirl who takes a holiday at St. Brides and realizes that something is amiss at the school. The pupils and headmasters believe that they are living in the 1920s, 50 years before the setting of the game. Trixie and her schoolmasters Fiona and Cynthia begin investigating the secret hidden within the school. The game contains a second optional objective, which is discovering an amulet hidden somewhere in the school. Players who succeeded in finding the amulet could request a certificate from the developers to commemorate their achievement.

== Reception ==
The game received mixed reviews at the time of its release. A review from Computer Gamer awarded the game 3/5 for story and graphics, and 4/5 for atmosphere and value for money. The review called it " a very silly adventure, written by some very silly people — and all the better it is for that too. It is witty, absorbing, and above all, fun."
