= Dracula (1986 video game) =

- Publisher: CRL Group
- Designers: Rod Pike; Ian Ellery
- Platforms: Amstrad CPC, Commodore 64, ZX Spectrum
- Release: 31st October 1986
- Genre: Interactive fiction
- Mode: Single-player

Dracula is a text adventure game by CRL released in 1986 for the Commodore 64, Amstrad CPC, and ZX Spectrum home computers. The game is based on the novel Dracula by Bram Stoker. It was the first video game to be rated by the BBFC. The game received a 15 certificate.

== Plot ==
An English lawyer travels to Carpathia to meet Count Dracula regarding a routine property transaction, but soon learns that his client has sinister ulterior intentions.

== Gameplay ==
The game is a standard text adventure with static graphics in some locations. It is divided into three parts:

- "First Night" - The young solicitor arrives in Count Dracula's country, staying at the Golden Krone Hotel; strange events are observed
- "The Arrival" - After an eventful journey, he arrives at Dracula's castle, and soon learns the real nature of his host's intentions; he realizes that he must escape if he is to survive...
- "The Hunt" - A psychiatrist at an insane asylum in England receives a strange letter from a friend on business overseas, warning of "boxes of earth" and the "undead"; meanwhile a patient at the asylum grows increasingly disturbed...

== Certification ==
CRL's Clement Chambers stated that upon seeing the finished game he felt the "only responsible action was to seek legal advice". Dracula became the first game to be rated by the British Board of Film Censors, primarily for the text rather than the images, and received a "15" certificate. CRL expressed disappointment with this as they had hoped for an "18" certificate.

== Legacy ==
CRL followed Dracula with three further adventures of a similar style, Frankenstein, Jack the Ripper and Wolfman, all of which also received BBFC ratings.
