= Robin of Sherlock =

1985 video game

- Developer: Delta 4
- Publishers: Silversoft; CRL Group
- Engine: The Quill
- Platforms: Amstrad CPC, ZX Spectrum
- Release: 1985
- Genre: Text adventure
- Mode: Single-player

Robin of Sherlock is a 1985 adventure game developed by Delta 4 and published by Silversoft. It parodies the earlier games The Hobbit and Sherlock. It was written using The Quill.

The game mixes the worlds of Robin Hood and Sherlock Holmes with a number of characters from other media, including Smurfs, Dorothy from The Wizard of Oz, Red Riding Hood, Goldilocks, and others. It also involves Professor Moriarty masquerading as Herne the Hunter.
