= Tau Ceti (video game) =

1985 video game

- Atari ST box art
- Developer: CRL Group PLC
- Publisher: CRL Group PLC
- Designers: Pete Cooke, Chris Newcombe (128K Spectrum enhancements)
- Platforms: Amstrad CPC, Amstrad PCW, Atari ST, Commodore 64, MS-DOS, ZX Spectrum
- Release: 1985: Spectrum; 1986: Atari ST, Amstrad, C64; 1987: MS-DOS
- Genres: Action, simulation
- Mode: Single-player

Tau Ceti is a video game published in 1985 by CRL for the ZX Spectrum and converted to the Amstrad CPC, Amstrad PCW, Atari ST, Commodore 64, and MS-DOS. It was designed and programmed by Pete Cooke. The world, set on Tau Ceti III orbiting Tau Ceti, is displayed using 3D graphics with shadow effects. The planet has a day and night cycle.

Tau Ceti: The Special Edition, was released for the 128K Spectrum and Amstrad CPC in 1987, with extra coding by Chris Newcombe. A sequel, Academy, was released in 1986.

== Origins and development ==
The origins of Tau Ceti and its game engine came from Cooke attempting to work out how the spheres in the game Gyron, released by Firebird Software for the ZX Spectrum in 1985, had been created:

...for a long while it had puzzled me how on earth they did the spheres. It obviously couldn't be a sprite because they didn't have enough memory to have that many sprites.

I finally twigged that they must have used a table of line widths, and I thought about it a bit, then realised I could split it three quarters and a quarter, and then it would look like a shadow.

I just went away and played with that for quite a long while and got it so that I had the sun in the sky and the shadow in the right place. And it sort of came from that, really.

Having created the basics of a game engine, Cooke had to decide on a scenario for his new game:

It was all made up as I went along. I know a bit about astronomy, so I looked around for a likely location - because the way the routine works meant it couldn't be in space; you couldn't have the sun above because the line-draw routine wouldn't work, it would have to be on the surface of a planet. And I thought 'Right, it can't be Earth because it looks a bit barren for Earth, it's got to be another planet.' So I looked round for nearby stars that might be inhabited and Tau Ceti had a nice-sounding name.

Cooke was also inspired when writing Tau Ceti by the works of the science-fiction writers Larry Niven and Isaac Asimov, and the space-simulator Elite.

== Plot ==
Humanity has spread out and colonised nearby star systems but a plague in 2150 led to the colonies being abandoned and left to their automated robotic maintenance systems. While several of these colonies have been successfully re-inhabited, the colony on the planet Tau Ceti III (orbiting the star Tau Ceti) has been uncontactable since a meteor smashed into the planet. A mission sent to Tau Ceti III in 2164 landed on the planet but broadcast a mayday message followed by silence. Experts decided that the planet's robots were running amok as a result of the meteorite impact. The only chance, it was decided, of successfully stopping the defence systems without destroying the cities already there is to send a single pilot in an armoured Gal-Corp skimmer to the planet's surface with the task of shutting down the central reactor in Tau Ceti III's capital, Centralis.

== Gameplay ==
Atari ST gameplay

The planet Tau Ceti III consists of several cities which themselves consist of clusters of buildings with their defensive laser towers and patrolling robot Hunter ships. The player's skimmer can dock with some of these buildings and find parts needed to help shut down the central reactor as well as refuel and find vital information. The cities themselves can be travelled to by means of a "jump pad" which makes the long trips between them much quicker.

The gameworld is displayed in a 3D view from the skimmer. As well as displaying these 3D graphics, Cooke's game engine renders them with simple shadows in order to simulate the day and night cycle of Tau Ceti III. These days are much shorter than Earth's consisting of one spin of the planet per hour with sixteen "spins" to a Cetian day.

The cities of Tau Ceti III are extremely hostile places as they are full of robot defences. These consist of laser towers, Fortresses (which are essentially better-armoured Towers), Hunter ships (of which there are three types: Mark I, Mark II and Mark III), and slowly moving mines. To defend itself against these, the skimmer is armed with lasers, missiles, and ammunition (to destroy missiles fired by robot Hunters). The skimmer also has a shield although its power is limited and if the shield is badly depleted or exhausted, the skimmer will take damage and some of its systems will fail. They can be repaired at any supply centre.

Any static defences (e.g. buildings) which are destroyed are permanently destroyed. Any mobile defences (Hunters, droids, etc.) are renewed when the player leaves a city; so cities are never fully cleared. Cities vary greatly in their defences; a few cities are almost undefended (just minefields), a few cities are intensely defended (e.g. Centralis, where the main reactor is).

The skimmer is also fitted with a scanner in order to detect buildings or Hunters not in its forward view or at a distance, and a compass to aid navigation. To cope with Tau Ceti III's frequent hours of darkness, the skimmer has an infra-red display mode and also carries a limited number of short-lived flares.

Although Tau Ceti is primarily an action game, it has some text-input sections when the skimmer docks or lands on the planet's surface. When this happens, the player can communicate with the skimmer using simple commands such as "HELP", "STATUS" or "SCORE" to get access to game information. If docked with a building, "LOOK" will display a picture of the inside of the building and "EQUIP" will allow access to anything useful in that building.

As with some other Cooke games, the game also has an inbuilt note-taking system (accessed via the command "PAD") to take notes without using pen and paper.

=== Reactor rods ===
In order to shut down the central reactor, the main objective of the game, the player must first locate the forty pieces of the reactor cooling rods and assemble them into twenty complete rods which can then be inserted into the reactor to shut it down. The assembly of the rods is achieved by using the command "RODS" which displays a screen showing found rod-pieces which can then be assembled in a manner similar to a simple jigsaw puzzle.

== Reception ==
Reception

Review scores
Publication	Score
Computer and Video Games	9.5/10 (average)
Sinclair User	5.0/5
Your Sinclair	9/10
Crash	94%
Your Computer	4.0/5
Zzap!64	93%

Awards
Publication	Award
Crash	Crash Smash
Sinclair User	SU Classic
Your Sinclair	Megagame

Response from the gaming media was very positive. CRASH, a Spectrum gaming magazine, summed Tau Ceti up in 1985 as "an excellent game, combining several elements with stunning graphics" and gave it an overall rating of 94%. Another Spectrum magazine, Sinclair User, gave it a 5 star rating and declared "It's hard to imagine a better space game, unless one's talking about Elite, with its intergalactic scope and strategic depth. Viewed as a shoot 'em up with a purpose to the carnage, Tau Ceti has to be one of the all-time greats."

Commodore User magazine provoked controversy in their tips page for the Commodore 64 version of the game, when they announced that the final two reactor parts necessary could never be made to fit, and that it was impossible to complete the game.
