= Ninja Hamster =

1987 video game

- Developer: CRL Group
- Publisher: CRL Group
- Designer: Colin Ajayi-obe
- Composer: Colin Ajayi-obe
- Platforms: Amstrad CPC, Commodore 64, ZX Spectrum
- Release: EU: 1987
- Genre: Fighting
- Modes: Single-player, multiplayer

Ninja Hamster is a 2D fighting video game published by CRL Group for the Amstrad CPC, Commodore 64 and ZX Spectrum.

== Gameplay ==
Gameplay screenshot

Ninja Hamster plays like other fighting games. The player-controlled hamster is on one side and the animals are on the other. The animals are all minions of the Sinister Rat. Combatants use joystick and button press combos to inflict damage on the opponent. Each combatant has an energy bar, which is somewhat drained upon each hit the character receives. Energy replenishes over time, necessitating a repeated assault to wear down an opponent. Once the energy bar is depleted, the character loses one bite out of its Green Apple and the energy bar is reset. When the Green Apple is entirely "eaten", the character dies. When the hamster defeats one animal, it moves on to face another. Eight opponents must be defeated. Eventually the hamster battles with the mastermind, Sinister Rat. An optional second player can control the animals. The player's score is displayed in the lower left corner of the screen. The all-time high score for the game is displayed in the lower right.

== Reception ==
Zzap!64 thought very poorly of Ninja Hamster. While easy to play, they felt the game had little staying potential. Battling characters took, in their view, too long and was repetitive. They praised the sound as stereotypical but still lively. One reviewer called the soundtrack a "surprisingly jolly" and "punchy little oriental number". They disparaged the graphics for their perceived low quality and monotony. They concluded that the title was "A poor beat'em up which falls far short of its potential".

Commodore User were similarly unimpressed, criticising the "Spectrumesque" graphics and "dead boring" gameplay which made it "not worth buying." It was rated 4/10 overall.
