= Academy (video game) =

1986 video game

- Developer: CRL Group
- Publisher: CRL Group
- Designer: Pete Cooke
- Series: Tau Ceti
- Platforms: ZX Spectrum, Amstrad CPC, Amstrad PCW, Amiga, Atari ST, MS-DOS
- Release: 1986
- Genre: Simulation
- Mode: Single-player

Academy is a simulation video game for the Commodore 64, MS-DOS, ZX Spectrum, Amstrad CPC, and Amiga It was released in 1986 by the CRL Group. It is the sequel to Tau Ceti and written by the same author, Pete Cooke.

== Gameplay ==
The gameplay is similar to Tau Ceti—the player pilots a 'skimmer' through a 3D world—but with additional features. Instead of a single, large gameworld, the storyline is mission-based (but allowing the player some control over the order of play). The world physics of the original game are expanded on, as these missions take place on different planets under different suns; for example piloting under a dark red-dwarf provides a different play experience to a bright yellow sun.

In addition, the player may design their own skimmers; customising engine and weapon strengths, equipment payloads, and arranging the on-screen control panel.

The game's interface is the same cursor-and-menu system used in Pete Cooke's other creations, such as Micronaut One, A Whole New Ball Game and Tau Ceti.

== Plot ==
From the game's instructions:

After an incident on 61 Cygnus in 2197 when a rookie pilot selected the wrong gear when docking with the main central reactor and reduced half the planet to molten lava, Gal-Corp decided that a special training facility was needed to provide an elite corps of pilots for the advanced military skimmers used in colonisation and reconnaissance work.

The Galcorp Academy for Advanced Skimmer Pilots (GASP) was founded in 2213 to meet this requirement. With an intake of over a hundred would be skimmer pilots a year, only a few meet the exacting requirement of flying and combat skills.

In order to graduate from the Academy cadets must complete 20 missions, grouped in five levels of four, successfully.

A user-created skimmer

== Reception ==
Reception

Awards
| Publication | Award |
|---|---|
| Your Sinclair | Megagame |
| Amstrad Action | Mastergame |
| Crash | Smash |

Your Sinclair scored the game 9/10, and a Megagame award, with reviewer Phil South impressed with the skimmer design system and the difficulty level of the missions. CRASH awarded the game 92%, praising its slick presentation, mission structure and 3D graphics rendering.
