= Kingdom O' Magic =

1996 video game

- Developer: Sales Curve Interactive
- Publisher: Sales Curve Interactive
- Designer: Fergus McNeill
- Platform: MS-DOS
- Release: UK: April 1996; NA: August 1996
- Genre: Adventure
- Mode: Single-player

Kingdom O' Magic is a video game released by Sales Curve Interactive in 1996. It is a comedic point and click adventure game parodying fantasy fiction. It can be played with either of two available protagonists, Thidney or Sha-ron.

Kingdom O' Magic was planned for release on four different systems: MS-DOS, PlayStation, Macintosh, and Sega Saturn. However, only the MS-DOS version was ever released.

== Themes ==
The game, penned by television writer Alan Silberberg, is filled with surreal humor. For instance, the instruction manual claims that the game was "First published in 1876 under the title '101 fun things To Do with Trolls'. However, the version on CD-ROM is specially calibrated for short people with red hair."

It was designed by Fergus McNeill. As in his previous games, Bored of the Rings and The Boggit, the game parodies J. R. R. Tolkien's Middle-earth. Various elements in the games are parodies of Middle-earth characters and locations, such as "The High Steward of Minar Tragedy, Don Elrondo of Rivendull and Queen Galadrag of De-Lorean.

The closing credits sequence plays the theme to the 1970s British cartoon Roobarb, but there appears to be no other relationship between the works.

== Plot ==
In the beginning, the player can choose between two protagonists: Thidney the Lizard Bloke (voiced by John Sessions) or Shah-Ron the Girlie (voiced by Lani Minella) from planet Comely. According to the on-screen descriptions, Thidney is skilled in combat and Shah-Ron is skilled in magic.

There are three quests:

- The Good, Old Fashioned, Traditional Quest: The player wanders around the Kingdom fighting and completing various side-quests, until finally "rescue the dragon, steal the princess and kill the treasure".
- The Magnificent 7-11 Quest: The player has to find and recruit 7 to 11 characters from the Kingdom in order to protect Flake town from an upcoming invasion.
- The Bizarre & Slightly Twisted Quest: The player must find the Lost Lava Lamp Of The Ancient and defeat the Dark Lord, in order to save civilization.

== Gameplay ==
The player is surrounded by many NPCs moving around, such as karate elves fighting against and ringwraiths. The player can interact with non-hostile characters, triggering a dialogue tree. Talking is handled by choosing from multiple responses, leading to different directions of conversation.

Combat occurs when approaching a NPC with a weapon selected. All violence is covered by a cloud as seen in many cartoons, and then the two combatants walk away as if nothing had happened.

There are also magic spells to supplement the combat system, but their effects, while humorous, are largely unhelpful.

== Remake ==
A team had begun making an unofficial remake of Kingdom O' Magic using the Adventure Game Studio engine.
