= St Bride's Church (disambiguation) =

St Bride's Church is a church in the City of London, England.

St Bride's Church may also refer to:

- St. Bride's Church, Dublin, Ireland
- St Bride's Church, East Kilbride, Scotland
- St Bride's Church, Glasgow, Scotland
- St Bride's Church, Liverpool, England
- St Bride's Church, Onich, Scotland
- St Bride's Church, Llansantffraed, Monmouthshire, Wales
- St Bride's Church, Mauku, New Zealand

== See also ==
- St Brides (disambiguation)
