= St Columba's Church, Burtonport =

St Columba's, Burtonport
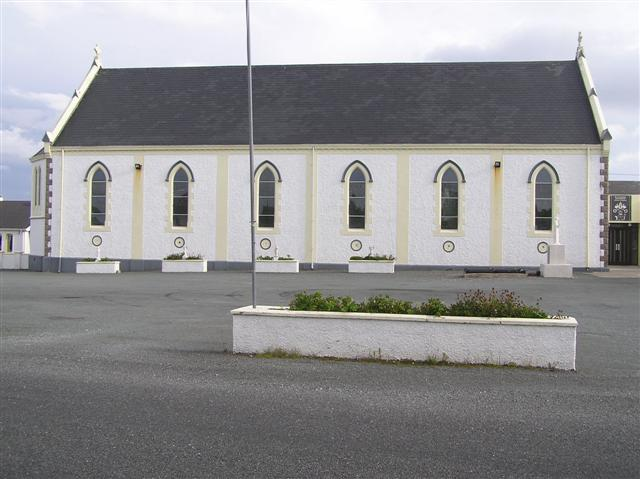
- St Columba's, Burtonport
- Denomination: Roman Catholic
- Website: Kincasslagh and Burtonport Parish

History
- Status: Active

Architecture
- Groundbreaking: 15 October 1898
- Completed: 1899

Administration
- Diocese: Raphoe
- Parish: Kincasslagh & Burtonport

Clergy
- Priest: Priests of St. Columba’s Church 1900 Fr. Patrick Brennan 1905 Fr. E. J. O’Doherty Fr. P. D. McCaul 1908 Fr. Patrick McCafferty Fr. John McGroarty 1923 Fr. BJA Sweeney 1928 Fr. P O’Boyle 1929 Fr. John McAteer 1939 Fr. B. Duggan 1940 Fr. James O’Byrne 1944 Fr. Manus Harkin 1945 Fr. John McIntyre Fr. JR Griffith 1954 Fr. William Lynagh 1964 Fr. Charles McFadden: 1974. Fr. Hugh Sweeney; 1974 Fr. Daniel McDyer 1985 Fr. Daniel O’Doherty 2002 Fr. Matt McInerney 2000 Fr. Jimmy Shiels 2004 Fr. Pat Ward

St Columba's Church, Burtonport is a Catholic church which serves the coastal village of Burtonport in County Donegal, Ireland.

The church was built in 1898–1899. It was the second church built in the parish after St Mary's in Belcruit, 1856. St. Mary's had a permanent curate until 2004 and both mainland churches are now served by one parish priest.

The third church of the parish, St. Crone's, is on Arranmore Island. Fr. John Boyce is the curate.

Fr. Dan McDyer added the sacristy during his tenure.

Fr. Dan O’Doherty added the bell tower in 1999 to mark the new millennium.

The old parochial house sat where St. Columba's Community Centre is now situated and housed a Parish priest and a curate. The new parochial house was built in 1985 by Fr. Dan McDyer. The parish belongs to the Diocese of Raphoe.
