= Thundercross =

1988 video game

Thundercross is a 1988 side-scrolling shoot-em-up video game for the Commodore 64, published by CRL.

== Reception ==
Ken McMahon for Commodore User said: "There's nothing wrong with Thundercross [...] The one thing you can be sure of though is that it won't win any awards for originality." ASM (Aktueller Software Markt) gave it a rating of 9. Zzap! rated it 16% Power Play gave it a rating of 1. Pelit gave it one star. Tilt gave it a B.
