= The Colour of Magic (video game) =

1986 video game

- Original cover art
- Developer: Delta 4
- Publisher: Piranha Software
- Series: Discworld
- Platforms: ZX Spectrum, Amstrad CPC, Commodore 64
- Release: 1986
- Genre: Interactive fiction
- Mode: Single-player

The Colour of Magic is a text adventure game developed by Delta 4 and published by Piranha Software, released in 1986. It was released for the ZX Spectrum, Amstrad CPC, and Commodore 64 computers. It is the first Discworld computer game and so far the only one adapted directly from one of the novels, and follows the plot of the book closely.

In 2006, another video game based on The Colour of Magic was released on mobile phones titled Discworld: The Colour of Magic. It is an isometric action game.

== Reception ==
Wendy Graham reviewed The Colour of Magic Computer Adventure for Adventurer magazine and stated that "Playing with book in hand, I still got nowhere very slowly, and a chum to whom I passed the game reported that he didn't think much of it either, and also gave up in vexation very early on. Pity."
