= The Boggit: Bored Too =

1986 video game

- Developer: Delta 4
- Publisher: CRL Group
- Designers: Fergus McNeill; Judith Child
- Platforms: Amstrad CPC, Commodore 64, ZX Spectrum
- Release: 1986
- Genre: Interactive fiction
- Mode: Single-player

The Boggit: Bored Too is a text adventure game by Delta 4 released in 1986 for the Commodore 64, Amstrad CPC, and ZX Spectrum home computers. The game is a parody of the J. R. R. Tolkien novel The Hobbit and of the earlier game based upon it also called The Hobbit. It is the prequel to Bored of the Rings.

== Plot ==
Bimbo Faggins and Grandalf must find treasure, solve puzzles, and appear on a gameshow.

== Gameplay ==
The game is in 3 separate parts, each of which is loaded separately. Commands are entered in either full sentences or using a verb / noun format. Conversations with other characters in the game are possible.

The player can also save and load a game position in computer memory.

== Reception ==
Reception

Awards
Publication	Award
Crash	Crash Smash
Sinclair User	SU Classic

Sinclair User magazine wrote that The Boggit was "just as funny and sick as its predecessor but is better presented and a whole lot snappier. It's miles better than the game it lampoons too."

== See also ==
- Kingdom O' Magic, another fantasy parody game by the same designer
