= Earthlight (video game) =

1988 video game

- Cover art
- Developer: Nexus
- Publisher: Firebird Software
- Designer: Pete Cooke
- Platform: ZX Spectrum
- Release: EU: 1988
- Genre: Scrolling shooter
- Mode: Single-player

Earthlight is a horizontally scrolling shooter published for the ZX Spectrum in 1988 by Firebird Software. Written by Pete Cooke, Earthlight features parallax scrolling and shadow effects, a novelty for the Spectrum.

== Plot ==
The player takes the role of an alien explorer from the star-system of Arcturus, called Slaatn, who has been drawn off-course by a beam of energy from Earth and has had to make a landing on the Moon. Slaatn must neutralise the box-like transmitters and thus eliminate the force field.

== Reception ==
Reception

Award
Publication	Award
Crash	Crash Smash

CRASH awarded the game 90%, with the reviewers impressed with every aspect of the game, particularly the 3D shaded graphics and the sound effects. The gameplay was compared to that of Uridium. Your Sinclair awarded 8/10, describing it as a polished game but without the depth of Pete Cooke's previous releases.
