= CRL Group =

British video game development and publishing company

CRL Group PLC
- Formerly: Computer Rentals Limited
- Type: Private
- Industry: Video games
- Founded: 29 April 1982; 44 years ago
- Founder: Clement Chambers
- Defunct: 1991
- Headquarters: 9 King's Yard, Carpenters Road, London E15 2HD, England
- Area served: United Kingdom
- Key people: Ian Ellery
- Products: Tau Ceti, Academy

CRL Group plc was a British video game development and publishing company. Originally CRL stood for "Computer Rentals Limited". It was based in King's Yard, London and run by Clem Chambers.

They released a number of notable adventure games based on horror stories. Dracula and Frankenstein were rated 15 certificate by the British Board of Film Censors for their graphics depicting bloody scenes; Dracula was the first game to be rated by the BBFC. Jack the Ripper was the first game to receive an 18 certificate, Wolfman also gained an 18 certificate.

CRL-published games that achieved critical success include Tau Ceti and Academy.

The 1984 game of the series Terrahawks was one of the first video games based on a TV show.

== Games ==
=== 1983 ===
- Rescue
- 3D Desert Patrol
- Alien Maze
- Bomber
- Caveman
- Crawler
- Derby Day
- Draughts
- Escape from Manhattan
- Galactic Patrol
- Grand National
- Jackpot
- Lunar Rescue
- One Day Cricket
- Pandemonia
- Test Match
- The Omega Run
- The Orb
- Space Mission
- Zaraks

=== 1984 ===
- £.s.d.
- Ahhh!!
- Cricket 64
- Glug Glug
- Handicap Golf
- Handy Andy
- Incredible Adventure
- Olympics
- Orpheus in the Underworld
- Show Jumping
- Terrahawks
- The Great Detective
- The Magic Roundabout
- Tritz
- Whirlybird
- The War of the Worlds
- The Warlock's Treasure
- The Woods of Winter

=== 1985 ===
- Blade Runner
- Bored of the Rings^{2}
- Endurance
- Formula One
- Juggernaut
- Space Doubt
- Tau Ceti
- The Causes of Chaos
- The Rocky Horror Show

=== 1986 ===
- Academy
- Bugsy
- Doctor What!
- Dracula
- Hercules^{1}
- Pilgrim
- Robin of Sherlock^{2}
- Room Ten
- Samurai
- The Boggit
- The Very Big Cave Adventure

=== 1987 ===
- Ball Breaker
- Book of the Dead
- Cyborg
- Death or Glory
- Federation^{3}
- Frankenstein
- From Darkness into Light
- I-Alien
- IQ
- Jack the Ripper
- Jet-Boys
- Last Mohican
- Lifeforce
- Loads of Midnight
- Mandroid
- Murder off Miami
- Ninja Hamster
- Oink!
- Outcast
- Plasmatron
- Sun Star
- They Call Me Trooper
- Traxxion
- Vengeance

=== 1988 ===
- Ball Breaker II
- CounterForce
- Cyberknights
- Discovery
- International Soccer^{4}
- Kellogg's Tour 1988
- NATO Assault Course
- Purple Heart
- Road Warrior
- Sophistry
- Thundercross
- Time Fighter
- To Hell and Back
- Trigger Happy
- Wolfman

=== 1989 ===
- Inner Space
- Lancaster
- Professional Soccer
- Search for the Titanic

=== 1990 ===
- Hellhole

=== Unreleased ===
- Enchantress
- Spearhead
- The Blues Brothers
- The Malinsay Massacre

== Software ==
- Fifth (1983)
- Stargazer Secrets (1983)
- Highway Code (1984)
- 3D Game Maker (1987)
- 2D Game Maker (1988)

== Notes ==
^{1} Hercules was originally released in 1984 by Interdisc
^{2} Bored of the Rings and Robin of Sherlock were originally released in 1985 by Delta 4
^{3} Federation was originally released as Quann Tulla in 1985 by 8th Day Software
^{4} International Soccer was originally only released on cartridge in 1983 by Commodore International
