= Aristasia =

British subcultural group

Aristasia was a British female-focused subcultural group, or shared worldbuilding project and role-playing setting, that combined Guénonian Traditionalism with elements of lesbian separatism. The group had its origins in the Oxford area in the 1960s or 1970s. They received the most media attention in the 1990s. Rejecting the modern world (and post-1960s culture in particular), Aristasians sought to recreate the lifestyles of the 1920s–1950s, wearing period clothes, watching period movies, etc. One anonymous member explained the nature of the group: "Aristasia is a game. But then schools, corporations, armies, nations are all games. They happen to be bigger and wealthier games than ours. But ours is better." (Note: Along these lines, some Aristasians have made reference to the Hindu concept of Lila.) Estimates of the group's size ranged from dozens to hundreds of followers. The writer Marianne Martindale was a prominent member, acting as the face of the movement. Her previous group, the Silver Sisterhood, had similar beliefs and practices.

Aristasians created an elaborate cosmology and lexicon in which different temporal periods were re-conceived as geographical locations within the imagined world of Aristasia – the Victorian period became "Arcadia", the 1930s became "Trent", etc. Men did not exist in Aristasia; instead there were two sexes, "blondes" and "brunettes". These labels roughly mapped onto the categories of butch and femme, with "brunettes" being considered more masculine – although still more feminine than the average woman in the present-day "real world". At one point there was an "Aristasian Embassy" in London (a private house) that held "Embassy balls" and cocktail parties, to which guests were sometimes driven in a refurbished 1930s car (the "Embassy car"). Aristasians began creating websites and forums in the mid-1990s and used the internet (including Second Life) to engage in similar forms of creative writing and role-playing. In the mid-1990s Aristasia also incorporated practices reminiscent of BDSM, though Martindale publicly denied that Aristasian "discipline" was sexual in nature. Connections to far-right politics were another source of controversy.

== History, beliefs and practices ==
Precursors to the Aristasians appear to have come together in the Oxford area in the 1960s or 1970s. Grace writes that the Aristasians grew out of a syncretic religious group called the Madrians that formed around 1973. The Madrians were influenced by the Traditionalism of René Guénon and Ananda Coomaraswamy, but also by a variety of other ideological and religious traditions: "pre-Vatican II Roman Catholic Marian devotion, imported currents of bhakti-oriented Hindu Shaktism, feminist-aligned Wicca, and lesbian separatist discourse."

Sedgwick writes that the "Aristasia" name was adopted in the 1980s. In 1995 Martindale told reporters that the name was "a feminine version of the Greek Aristos, meaning the best." Following Guénon, the Aristasians believed that modernity was irredeemably corrupt. This was coupled with a belief (influenced by Marija Gimbutas) in ancient matriarchy; Aristasians believed that in the past society was governed by "spiritual and qualitative" female attributes, while in modernity it is governed by inferior "material and quantitative" male values.

Corporal punishment (spanking and caning) was another element of Aristasia's mythos, leading to media attention in the mid-1990s. In 1995 Martindale published a "Female Disciplinary Manual" (released by The Wildfire Club, Aristasia's publishing arm), appearing at media events in period dress. Reporters drew connections with BDSM, which Martindale denied, telling The Guardian that Aristasian discipline was not sexual: "Discipline is not chained to fleshy gross things. It can be an inner feeling, very uplifting. Enlightening." The Guardian also noted that antisemitic literature and letters from British National Party leader John Tyndall had been found at the house occupied by Martindale and the Silver Sisterhood in Ireland after they left in 1992. In one letter, Tyndall wrote, "I admire and respect what you are doing to the point of fascination." Martindale told the paper that she had no interest in fascism, democracy, or "any masculine political movement".

In 1996 Out's Sophia Chauchard-Stuart reported that Aristasia funded its London "embassy" through the sale of Wildfire Club books, as well as whips and other fetish paraphernalia. Writing in Filament magazine in 2010, Zak Jane Keir reported that Aristasia's books sold well in kink circles in the 1990s. Chauchard-Stuart described the activities of London area Aristasians:

Inside the embassy, there are no books or records allowed that were produced after the early 1960s. None of the group's 250 devotees reads newspapers or watches television, and wearing trousers ("the forbidden article") is strictly outlawed--as is any actual sexual contact between the 'girls.' Instead they attend discussion groups on feminist essentialism, watch late 1950s movies, and have nonsexual spankings for naughty members.

How, then, to explain the presence of Melissa, 27, an über-femme and out lesbian on the London scene, who on Sunday nights leaves the bars behind, pulls on a 1940s tea dress, stockings, and high heels, and drives out to the Aristasian embassy to become 'Patricia.' For Melissa, visiting the temple to the feminine allows her to fulfill a few fantasies and escape from the realities of life as a '90s woman. 'Aristasia allows me to express the gentle and feminine side of my nature--as well as the condescending and arrogant side of myself,' she says. 'I don't have to pretend to be less than I am, I can talk about the books that I've read, the music that I love, and the cultural ideas I have.'

Some weeks, 'Patricia' will wear a school uniform and receive whippings from a schoolmistress. At other times, she will sit demurely on a chaise and discuss sex and philosophy. Why does she go, if sex is not on the agenda? Melissa laughs and says, 'I think it creates a sense of frisson. And I do get to live out those fantasies of boarding school life and ginger beer.'

Keir writes that the Aristasian community withdrew from public (off-line) activities in 2005 (an event known as "Operation Bridgehead"), with most British participants moving to the United States around that time.

== Language ==
The Aristasians developed their own lexicon, some examples of which are given by Keir:

- The Eclipse – The cultural and spiritual collapse of the late 1960s
- The Pit – Post-Eclipse society
- Racination – The process of undoing the damage that the Pit has done to our spirits, regaining a sense of innocence, joy, and wonder
- Bongo – Someone strongly embedded in the Pit (Note: The Aristasians were criticized for the racial connotations of this term, given its apparent derivation from Bongo Bongo Land, a term Martindale also used in reference to the non-Aristasian world.)
- Ordinator – a computer
- Real – authentically belonging to the past era being evoked

== Size ==
In 1995 The Guardian reported that there were five or six Aristasian households in the UK, and one in France. The following year, Chauchard-Stuart wrote of "250 devotees". In 2004 Sedgwick wrote that there were around 40 Aristasians. In 2010 Keir wrote that the movement seemed to have a few hundred online followers.

== Reception and interpretations ==
Assessing the group, Sedgwick writes that it was "permeated by the quirky humor characteristic of its Oxonian birthplace, where the expression of deeply held convictions is rarely free of an element of jest, and where no joke can be safely assumed not to conceal a very serious point." Describing the movement as a kind of "invented religion", Grace writes that Aristasia "was no less earnest for being openly fanciful, and real perspective and spiritual growth were meant to be achieved through its role-play." Keir writes that "holding a conversation with a true Aristasian is ultimately ever-so-slightly mindbending. Their way of seeing the world is genuinely different. Those who insist that 'Real' Aristasia...exists on another plane, sound like absolute nuts. Others acknowledge that to them, really, it's all just a big role-play game." Veronique Mottier mentions Aristasia in the context of other LGBTQ separatist projects and micronations such as the Gay and Lesbian Kingdom of the Coral Sea Islands. Writing in 2023, the journalist and political commentator Mary Harrington evaluated Aristasia as a forerunner of present-day cultural trends (cosplay, LARPing, kink, online reactionary movements) and a cautionary tale illustrating that "the easiest dimension in which to create your own reality is the internet. But this comes at the price of being ever less able to realise your vision in real life."
