= Burtonport =

Gaeltacht village in County Donegal, Ireland

Ailt an Chorráin Burtonport
- Village
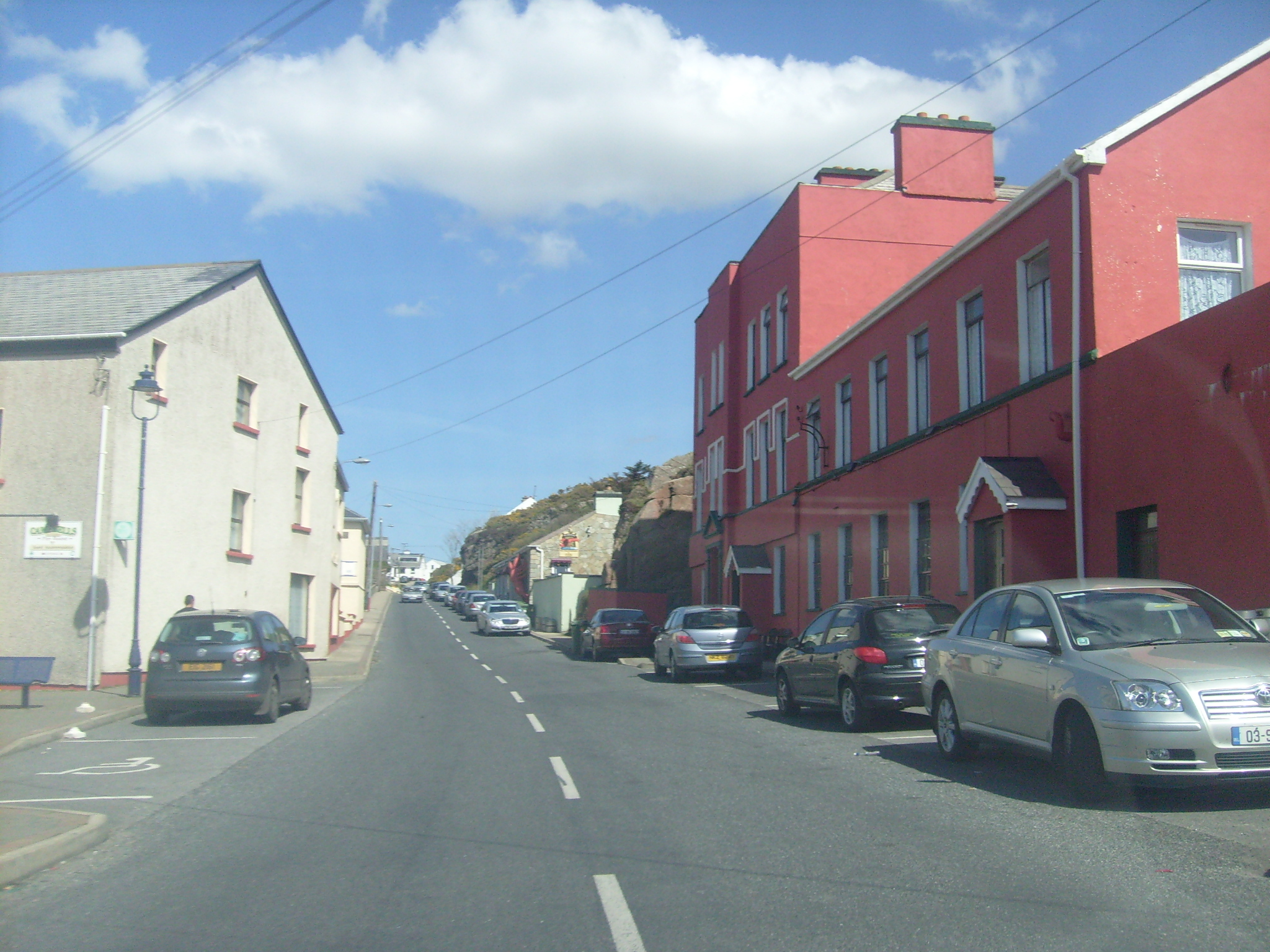

- Location in Ireland
- Coordinates: 54°58′56″N 8°26′04″W
- Country: Ireland
- Province: Ulster
- County: County Donegal
- Barony: Kilmacrenan

Government
  - Dáil Éireann: Donegal

Population (2022)
  - Total: 311
- Irish Grid Reference: B717154
- As this is a Gaeltacht village, the Irish Ailt an Chorráin is the only official name. However, the name 'Burtonport' remains in widespread use.

Ailt an Chorráin or Ailt a' Chorráin (English name: Burtonport) is a Gaeltacht fishing village about 7 km (4 mi) northwest of Dungloe in The Rosses district of County Donegal, Ireland. The main employers in the village were the Burtonport Fishermen's Co-op and the Bord Iascaigh Mhara (BIM; Irish Sea Fisheries Board) ice plant; but these have both since closed and their former premises were demolished in 2021 as part of a seafront environment upgrade scheme.

== History ==
Burtonport was developed by the Marquess of Conyngham as a rival to another planned village on the nearby Rutland Island.

A plaque in the village commemorates the brief landing on Rutland Island of a French military force led by James Napper Tandy in a failed attempt to assist rebels during the 1798 rebellion on 16 September 1798. St Columba's Church dates from 1899.

In 1974, a commune called Atlantis Primal Therapy Commune was established in Burtonport by Jenny James. The commune, which came to be known as "The Screamers" for its practice of primal therapy, moved to the island of Inishfree in 1980. From 1982 to 1992 Burtonport was the home of the Silver Sisterhood, a new religious movement. Members were part of the Goddess movement.

== Transport ==
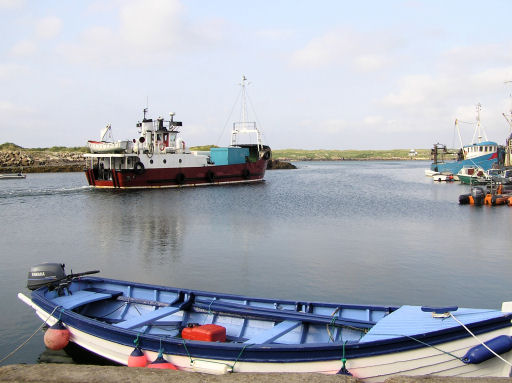
The ferry leaving Burtonport for Arranmore

As the mainland port for both the Arranmore car ferry services, Burtonport receives some passing tourist traffic. Burtonport had a railway service from Letterkenny between 1903 and 1940 provided by the Letterkenny & Burtonport Extension Railway (L&BER), a company jointly owned by the State and the Londonderry and Lough Swilly Railway (L&LSR). Burtonport railway station opened on 9 March 1903, but finally closed on 3 June 1940. The TFI Local Link Route 271 (Burtonport/Letterkenny) service links the area to Dungloe, Crolly and Letterkenny.

== People ==
- Packie Bonner, a football goalkeeper, is from the area around Burtonport.
- Joseph Duffy, a martial artist and UFC fighter, is from Burtonport.
- Pat "the Cope" Gallagher, a Fianna Fáil politician, was born in Burtonport.
- Major-General Joe Sweeney, an Irish military commander and politician who served as both an MP and as a TD, was born and raised in Burtonport.
- Miss Martindale, a leader of the Silver Sisterhood, resided in Burtonport.

== See also ==
- List of populated places in Ireland
