= Gilsoft =

British software developer

Gilsoft was a British developer of video games and related utilities. The company was best known for developing the text adventure authoring tool The Quill and its successor, Professional Adventure Writer.

== History ==
Gilsoft was set up by Tim Gilberts, at the time aged 17, in the early 1980s, using money from his father, who ran an electronics store. Gilberts had been writing software for the ZX81 prior to founding Gilsoft, but with the release of the ZX Spectrum, he was convinced that he could make money by satisfying the demand for games for the new platform. Many early titles developed by Gilberts for the Spectrum were clones of arcade games, among a few original titles. Gilsoft was initially run as a family business, with Gilberts acting as technical director, his father as managing director, his mother as company secretary, and his cousin as accountant. Other employees were mostly made up of friends and neighbours of the Gilberts family.

In 1982, Gilsoft was joined by Graeme Yeandle, who sought to write text adventure games for the company. To simplify these games' development process, Yeandle created a proprietary authoring tool that would eventually become available commercially as The Quill. While the tool was released for a price of £14.95, Gilsoft expected no royalties from sales made with games developed using it. According to Yeandle, he treated his creation the same as he would a C compiler, which is usually royalty-free. Following onto The Quill's success, Gilsoft also released Illustrator, an add-on for The Quill that allowed users to add graphics to their games, as well as a stand-alone follow-up, Professional Adventure Writer.

Eventually, Gilsoft as a limited company folded, and the team parted ways, including Gilberts' father, who started selling homebrew products.
