= Frankenstein (video game) =

1987 video game

- Publisher: CRL Group
- Designers: Rod Pike; Jared Derrett
- Platforms: Amstrad CPC, Commodore 64, ZX Spectrum
- Release: 1987
- Genre: Interactive fiction
- Mode: Single-player

Frankenstein is a text adventure game released by CRL in 1987 for the Commodore 64, Amstrad CPC, and ZX Spectrum home computers. The game is based on the 1818 novel Frankenstein; or, The Modern Prometheus by Mary Shelley.

== Plot ==
Dr. Frankenstein must find and destroy his murderous escaped monster; the monster must remain free and learn the reason for its existence.

== Gameplay ==
Frankenstein is a standard text adventure with static graphics in some locations to set the scene. It is similar to the earlier game Dracula, which was produced by the same author. It is divided into three parts; the player takes the role of Dr. Frankenstein in the first two, and of his monster in the third. Part One is entitled Hard Journey, Part Two The Slaying and Part Three The Monster's Story. Part Three is only accessible once the first two parts have been completed.

In the second part the player can engage in conversation with other characters. In the third part the player has to raise the monster's intelligence which can be done by using their senses. Both this and experiences they undergo will raise their IQ rating.

== Reception ==
As with the earlier CRL adventure Dracula, the game was awarded a "15" certificate for its gory graphics.

=== Reviews ===
- Sinclair User:
  "If you want an intelligent, gigantic text adventure with a few magnificent illustrations, FRANKENSTEIN's your man."
