= Professional Adventure Writer =

Text adventure construction kit

- Publisher: Gilsoft
- Designers: Tim Gilberts, Graeme Yeandle, Phil Wade
- Platforms: ZX Spectrum, Amstrad CPC
- Release: 1987
- Genre: Game creation system

Professional Adventure Writer (also referred to as the PAW) is a 1986 game creation software that allows users to write text adventure games with graphic illustrations. It was developed by Gilsoft for the ZX Spectrum and Amstrad CPC, as a successor to its previous software The Quill. Upon release, PAW received positive reviews, with critics praising the depth and flexibility of features, its accessibility for generalists, and its ability to create complex adventure games.

== Capabilities ==
PAW main menu

Professional Adventure Writer features a menu-based interface to allow players to create a graphic adventure game. The software consisted of a number of self-contained overlays, and depending on the computer memory of the user's machine, the desired overlays would be loaded in or switched. The software's parser supports a vocabulary of up to 1,500 words per game, and can identify and differentiate verbs, adverbs, pronouns, nouns and prepositions. These words are combined into logical sentences separated by "and", "then" or punctuation, and can create complex sentences of up to 125 characters. It has 256 flags for users to set, each with a specific function; some are customizable by the user, and others are used by the system to define mechanics such as the location of players. A compressor is included to reduce the file size and memory use of adventures.

The graphics editor is an overlay that allows players to draw imagery using the computer mouse or joystick, and tools to draw lines and fill shapes. Users create graphics by plotting points or lines that can be filled. It includes tools to edit the appearance of the software's 22 sets of text characters and the patterns used to fill shapes.

PAW was packaged with two instruction manuals: an introduction to writing adventure games using the software, and a technical guide that detailed available commands. An example adventure game named Tewk was also included with PAW that showcased its capabilities.

== Development and release ==
Professional Adventure Writer was developed by Gilsoft, and was the successor to its 1983 predecessor The Quill. PAW was developed in two parallel versions: a ZX Spectrum version with a graphical editor programmed by Tim Gilberts, and a non-graphical CP/M version programmed by Graeme Yeandle. Versions were created for the ZX Spectrum and Amstrad CPC and Amstrad PCW; planned versions for the Commodore 64, Amiga and Atari ST did not eventuate. The software competed with The Graphic Adventure Creator, a similar suite released by Incentive Software shortly before publication. Yeandle reflected that the software was not as successful as The Quill, speculating that "time was running out for text adventures" by the time of its release.

== Reception ==
Reception

Review scores
Publication	Score
Crash	97%
Sinclair User	5/5
8000 Plus	4/5

Professional Adventure Writer received positive reviews from critics, with many describing it as the best commercially available adventure game creator. Critics also praised improvements to the familiar design of its predecessor, The Quill. Describing it as a "remarkable invention" and exciting in its capabilities and potential applications, Crash praised the accessibility of the software's features and the depth and humor of its manual, hoping it could "lead the way to better and more imaginative" adventure titles. Sinclair User praised the power and flexibility of the software compared to its competitors, viewing its large vocabulary was made easy to use due to the accessibility of its menu system. Amstrad Action found the software "excellent" due to being simple to use and well-documented, writing that "it has so much built in that most of the programming has already been done for you". ZX Computing Monthly similarly praised the "unlimited scope" of possibilities of the software, although discussed difficulties in managing the memory of the software and difficulty in creating and integrating graphics.
