= The Quill (software) =

Text adventure creation kit

- Developer: Gilsoft
- Publisher: Gilsoft
- Designer: Graeme Yeandle
- Platforms: ZX Spectrum, Commodore 64, Amstrad CPC, BBC Micro, Acorn Electron, Atari 8-bit, Apple II, Oric
- Release: 1983
- Genre: Game creation system

The Quill is a game creation system for text adventures. Written by Graeme Yeandle, it was published on the ZX Spectrum by Gilsoft in December 1983. Although available to the general public, it was used by several games companies to create best-selling titles; over 450 commercially published titles for the ZX Spectrum were written using The Quill.

== Development ==
Main menu (ZX Spectrum)

Yeandle has stated that the inspiration for The Quill was an article in the August 1980 issue of Practical Computing by Ken Reed in which Reed described the use of a database to produce an adventure game. After Yeandle wrote one database-driven adventure game, Timeline, for Gilsoft, he realised that a database editor was needed, and it was this software which became The Quill.

After the original ZX Spectrum version was ported to the Amstrad CPC, Commodore 64, Atari 8-bit computers, Apple II, and Oric computers. Versions were also published by CodeWriter, Inc. in North America (under the name of AdventureWriter) and a version by Norace in Danish, Norwegian and Swedish. A French version was also made by Codewriter. In 1985 Neil Fleming-Smith ported The Quill to the BBC Micro and Acorn Electron computers for Gilsoft. Although not credited in the article, Chris Hobson submitted a patch to Crash magazine which allowed the Spectrum version to save to a Microdrive. This was published in the September 1986 edition

The Quill only allowed for the creation of text-only adventures, using a text interpretation process known as a verb–noun parser. Later an add-on called The Illustrator was made to let the user include graphics in the adventures. Further add-ons included The Press, The Patch, and The Expander, which enhanced the engine by adding text compression, split-screen text and graphics, and more efficient use of available RAM.

== Reception ==
The Quill was generally very well received by the computer press at the time of its release. Micro Adventurer described it as "a product [...] to revolutionise the whole microcomputer scene" and rated it "10 out of 10", while Computer and Video Games described it as "worth every penny of the £14.95 price tag", while CRASH said it was "almost ludicrously underpriced for what it does and, more importantly, what it allows others to do". Sinclair User praised the documentation and the complexity that was comparable to existing adventure game parsers, and in a later 1984 review said that "The Quill produces programs on a par with handwritten commercial programs". Commodore User described it as "one of the most amazing programs" and lauds how it reduces tedious work while allowing focus on making games, while itself being very cheap.

The Quill was awarded "Best Utility" in the CRASH Readers Awards 1984.

== Sequel ==
Following the success of the original, a second generation Quill was produced with more capabilities and sold under the name Professional Adventure Writer for the ZX Spectrum and CP/M range.

== See also ==
- Graphic Adventure Creator
