= Judge Dredd (disambiguation) =

Judge Dredd is a fictional character from the comic book strip which appears in the British science fiction anthology 2000 AD.

Judge Dredd may also refer to:

== Comics ==
- Judge Dredd (IDW Publishing), a 2012–2018 comics series
- Judge Dredd Megazine, a British comic published since 1990 by the same publisher as 2000 AD

== Films ==
- Judge Dredd (film), a 1995 film based on the character
- Dredd, a 2012 film also based on the character

== Games ==
- Judge Dredd (role-playing game), four role-playing games based around the character, including:
  - Judge Dredd: The Role-Playing Game, Games Workshop, 1985
  - The Judge Dredd Roleplaying Game, Mongoose, 2002
- Judge Dredd (board game), a 1982 game from Games Workshop
- Judge Dredd (1986 video game), a platform game
- Judge Dredd (1991 video game), a platform game
- Judge Dredd (pinball), a 1993 pinball game
- Judge Dredd (1995 video game), a platform game based on the film
- Judge Dredd (1997 video game), a shooter game

== See also ==
- Judge Dread (1945–1998), British musician
- Dredd (disambiguation)
