= Psst =

Psst is an onomatopoeia and may refer to:

- Pssst, a video game released for the ZX Spectrum
- Psssssst, a hair care product
- P$$t, a brand of Kroger food products
