= Cookie (video game) =

ZX Spectrum video game

- Developer: Tim and Chris Stamper
- Publisher: Ultimate Play the Game
- Platform: ZX Spectrum
- Release: UK: 1983
- Genre: Shoot 'em up
- Mode: Single-player

Cookie is a cooking-themed shoot 'em up developed and published by Ultimate Play the Game that was released exclusively for the ZX Spectrum in 1983. In the game, Charlie the Chef has to bake a cake, however his five ingredients are sentient and attempt to escape his pantry, enabling his quest to re-capture them. The game was written by Chris Stamper with graphics by Tim Stamper. It received mixed reviews upon release, with critics praising the graphics, but criticising the hard difficulty and its similarities to Pssst.

== Gameplay ==
The player must put all of the ingredients into the cooking bowl without them falling into the dustbins.

The game is presented from a 2D perspective, and the main objective involves Charlie the Chef baking a cake from evil, sentient ingredients. The five ingredients vary from Mixed Peel, Chunky Chocolate, Crafty Cheese, Sneaky Sugar and Colonel Custard, who will all jump out of the pantry and try to avoid the player whenever possible.

The player starts the game with three lives. Several ingredients will fly around the screen simultaneously, and if the player touches an ingredient with their body, a life will be deducted. The player's objective is to put the ingredients into the cooking bowl before they either fall into the dustbins on either side or knock the player into the bowl. As a defence, Charlie the Cook can shoot flour sacks, which will push the ingredients further in the direction they are moving in. Bombs may also spawn in the game, which will allow the player to push the ingredients further than conventional flour sacks. The player has to push the right variety of ingredients into the bowl, which changes for each level.

The game is complicated by the presence of a dustbin monster (similar to Oscar the Grouch) who regularly sticks his head out of one or the other of the dustbins and then flings an item of trash into the playfield. These will deduct a life from Charlie if they touch him, but can be knocked away with flour sacks in the same way that the ingredients can be, or they can be directed back into one of the dustbins. If a trash item enters the cooking bowl it will spoil the taste, and more ingredients will be required to be pushed into the bowl in order to fix this problem and complete the level.

When the right amount of ingredients has been put in the bowl, a cake is baked and a new level begins.

== Development ==
A version was also created for the BBC Micro and was scheduled for release in 1984; however, it was never commercially released.

Cookie was one of the few Spectrum games also available in ROM format for use with the Interface 2, allowing "instantaneous" loading of the game (the normal method of cassette loading could take several minutes).

== Reception ==
Reception

Review scores
Publication	Score
Crash	73%
Home Computing Weekly	5/5
Retro Gamer	70%

Matthew Uffindell of Crash praised the game overall, despite thinking it was overshadowed by Ultimate's Tranz Am. Uffindell stated the gameplay was addictive and challenging, despite thinking it was similar to its predecessor, Pssst. Lloyd Mangram of Crash considered the game to be overlooked and underrated, despite him suggesting that it was the most difficult of all games developed by Ultimate. Mangram praised the graphics as detailed, fast and "amusing", owing to the game's sentient ingredients. Reviewers of Home Computing Weekly similarly praised the graphics and sound, stating that they "are well up to Ultimate's standards".

A reviewer from Sinclair User stated that the graphics were of "arcade and cartoon" quality, and criticised the game's concept, suggesting that the player would lose interest after completing a few levels. Mangham, however, praised its playability, heralding that it was "great fun" to play and easy to adapt to. Sinclair User opined that first impressions of the game were important to the customer, and stated that the player may feel cheated due to the game's similarities to Pssst.
