= Dredd (disambiguation) =

Dredd is a 2012 film based on the Judge Dredd fictional universe

Dredd may also refer to:

== Judge Dredd/2000AD fictional universe ==
- Judge Dredd (Joseph Dredd), fictional character from Judge Dredd/"2000AD" fictional universe
- Vienna Dredd (Vienna Pasternak), fictional character from Judge Dredd/"2000AD" fictional universe
- Rico Dredd, fictional character from Judge Dredd/"2000AD" fictional universe
- Dredd (soundtrack), a soundtrack album based on the 2012 film

== Other uses ==
- Club DREDD, nightclub in Quezon City, Philippines.
- Miles Dredd (Dredd), fictional character from the Max Steele fictional universe
- Freddie Dredd (born 1997), Canadian rapper

== See also ==
- Receptor activated solely by a synthetic ligand, also known as DREADD
- Judge Dredd (disambiguation)
- Dread (disambiguation)
- Dred (disambiguation)
