= Dread =

Dread may refer to:

== Feelings ==
- Angst (in existentialist thought), a deep-seated spiritual condition of insecurity and despair in the free human being
- Anxiety
- Horror and terror

== People ==
=== Reggae musicians ===
- Doctor Dread (born 1954), American music producer
- Judge Dread (1945–1998), British musician
- Massive Dread (c. 1960–1994), Jamaican deejay
- Mikey Dread (1954–2008), Jamaican singer
- Ranking Dread (c. 1955–1996), Jamaican deejay

=== Other ===
- Adam Dread (born 1963), American lawyer and politician
- Zebulon Dread, South African writer
- Emmanuel Wilmer aka "Dread Wilmer" (died 2005)

== Arts, entertainment, and media ==
=== Fictional entities ===
- Dread & Alive, the award-winning black comic book series created by Nicholas Da Silva aka ZOOLOOK
- Brig of Dread (Bridge of Dread), the mythological bridge to Purgatory
- Judge Dread, the alternate universe Judge Dredd from Dread Dominion
- Lord Dread, a character in the TV series Captain Power and the Soldiers of the Future

=== Games ===
- Dread (role-playing game)
- Dread: The First Book of Pandemonium, a role-playing game
- Metroid Dread, a game in the Metroid franchise

=== Other arts, entertainment, and media ===
- Dread (album) recorded by Living Colour
- Dread (film) directed by Anthony DiBlasi
- "Dread", a short story in Clive Barker's Books of Blood series, or the comic book or stage adaptation of the same
- Dread Broadcasting Corporation, a London pirate radio station
- Dread (forum), a Reddit-like dark web discussion forum

== Other uses ==
- DREAD (risk assessment model)
- Dread, a model of centrifugal gun
- Dreadlocks, a hairstyle also known as dreads

== See also ==
- Anti Dread, Polish punk rock band
- Dred (disambiguation)
- Dredd (disambiguation)
- Receptor activated solely by a synthetic ligand, also known as DREADD
- Vandread, a science fiction anime
