= KKnD (series) =

Video game series

The KKnD logo as seen in the original game.

KKnD, or Krush, Kill 'n' Destroy is a series of post-apocalyptic real-time strategy games by Beam Software. KKnD was released in 1997, while a sequel - KKND2: Krossfire was released in 1998. KKnD Xtreme, an expanded version of the original, featuring extra missions and enhancements, was released in 1997, and later re-released on GOG.com in 2012, on Steam in 2020, and updated with multiplayer capabilities in 2026.

All games in the series feature a campaign for each of the different factions in each game, alongside multiplayer capabilities.

== Games in the series ==
- KKnD (1997)
- KKnD Xtreme (1997)
- KKnD 2: Krossfire (1998)
- KKnD: Infiltrator (1999, spin-off, cancelled)

An unofficial open-source remake that uses the OpenRA engine was made in 2018.

== Story ==
The year 2079 AD saw the realisation of Mankind's ultimate nightmare: an all-out nuclear war exterminates a quarter of the world's population almost instantly. Infrastructure collapses as mutagenic viruses infect humans and animals alike. Most of the survivors of the attack (aptly named the Survivors) live underground. Those who don't are mutated by the viruses and nuclear fallout (what they call the Evolved). 2141 sees the underground dwellers breaking through to the surface, after living underground for decades. Soon enough, the "Evolved" and "Survivors" meet. The Evolved and the Survivors do battle until the Survivors are surrounded at their underground HQ. The battle ends in a stalemate and both the Evolved and the Survivors retreat to recoup their losses for the next 40 years.

The Survivors return underground, re-evaluate their strategy and try to determine why they were nearly wiped out by the "freakers". Over time, they regroup and build new, superior weaponry in their determination to win the war for the surface. The Evolved retreat far into the wastelands and in turn wonder why they suffered such a loss against the "symmetrics". The Evolved council decree that use of pre-war technology had angered their gods, who denied them their victory as punishment. As a result, the Evolved shun pre-war machines and begin to utilise mutated animals in combat.

As the decades pass, a third faction arises: Series 9, agricultural robots who have developed self-awareness and begun to construct their own unique weapons of war.

After the war of 2079, the Series 9 agriculture robots realized their reason for existence was wiped out along with the withered crops. In time, partially malfunctioning due to the nuclear exchange, they begin to cultivate a deep-seated hate towards all humans. Series 9 focus first on the destruction of Series 5, 6, 7 and 8, Series 1-4 having already been wiped out in 2079. When Series 9 subsequently moved to attack the Survivors and the Evolved during their initial conflict, they quickly discovered that the organics possessed far greater weaponry in comparison to their agricultural tools. While the war for the surface raged on and then fell silent for 40 years, Series 9 developed their own weaponry in silence, in preparation for the next bout of hostilities.

In the end, the Survivors emerge victorious. Over time, nature returns to the Earth and the survivors rebuild their world far better than their old world.

== Gameplay ==
The gameplay in the KKnD series is similar to that of other real-time strategy games, such as Command & Conquer and StarCraft, created by Westwood and Blizzard respectively. The player uses resources to manufacture buildings which can create units and vehicles, which are used to exterminate opposing forces. Like the Z series of games, KKnD is tongue-in-cheek, not taking itself too seriously.
