= The Way of the Exploding Fist =

1985 video game

- Developer: Beam Software
- Publisher: Melbourne House
- Designers: Gregg Barnett; Bruce Bayley; David Johnston; Neil Brennan
- Composer: Neil Brennan
- Platforms: Commodore 64, Amstrad CPC, ZX Spectrum, BBC Micro, Acorn Electron, Commodore 16
- Release: PAL: June 1985; NA: April 1986
- Genre: Fighting game
- Modes: Single-player, multiplayer

The Way of the Exploding Fist (also known as Kung-Fu: The Way of the Exploding Fist in North America) is a 1985 fighting game developed by Beam Software and published by Melbourne House for the Commodore 64. It was later ported to Amstrad CPC, ZX Spectrum, BBC Micro, Acorn Electron and Commodore 16. It is based on Japanese martial arts. The development team consisted of Gregg Barnett, Bruce Bayley, Neil Brennan and David Johnston.

== Gameplay ==
Commodore 64 gameplay

The game has various backgrounds that change as the player progresses through the levels: inside a dojo, an outdoor field with snowy mountains and volcanoes, a Buddha statue, or some pagodas.

The player takes part in a series of one-on-one karate matches, all overseen by a wise old expert who appears in the background. Once the player defeats an opponent they move up to the next stage and a more difficult adversary. Fights are not won using the energy-bar style found in modern fighting games; instead, the player needed to get two complete yin-yangs. Any move that connected with the opponent would end the round; a loosely timed or borderline kick or punch would obtain half a yin-yang icon, while a well-executed move would obtain a full icon. Two complete icons ended the bout and progressed to the next level.

This system of scoring, known as shobu nihon kumite, is used in real life in many traditional styles of karate. A half yin-yang represents a waza-ari (a committed but not decisive technique) and a full yin-yang represents an ippon score (full point, decisive finishing blow).

The game control is via joystick or direction keys and a "fire" key. 18 different movements can be made, including jumping kick, roundhouse kick and a variety of punches and kicks, high and low. The game features a variety of backgrounds against which the fighting takes place. After completing a number of progressively harder stages, the player is charged at by a bull in a bonus round. The player must knock the bull out with a single hit. The bonus round mirrors the feats of Mas Oyama, a karate expert who purportedly killed bulls with a single strike. This bonus round was not present in the ZX Spectrum version and some of the early Commodore 64 versions.

== Production ==
Before creating The Way of the Exploding Fist, designer Gregg Barnett converted The Hobbit and Sherlock, two adventures from Beam Software, to the Commodore 64. It was one of the first games to borrow heavily from the Data East arcade game Karate Champ, which was released the previous year. The Commodore 64 version uses over 600 sprite images to animate the player's movements. Karate champion Jeoffrey Thompson was signed to promote the game but was not sufficiently well known to have the game named after him. A Nintendo Entertainment System version titled Exploding Fist was developed, but it was never released until Piko Interactive acquired the rights to the game and released it on the Evercade.

The game's soundtrack was written by Neil Brennan and it is based on the 1952 orchestral piece Dance of the Yao People. It has been praised for the excellent atmosphere it provided and was one reason behind the popularity of the game.

== Reception ==
Reception

Review scores
Publication	Score	
Publication	PC	ZX
Crash		92%
Sinclair User		5/5
Your Sinclair		83%
Computer Gamer	4/6 (CPC)	4/6
Retro Gamer	86% (8-bit)	

Awards
Publication	Award
Golden Joystick Awards	Game of the Year
Saturday Superstore Viewer Awards	Voted Best Game
Crash	Crash Smash
Sinclair User	SU Classic
Amstrad Action	Mastergame

The Way of the Exploding Fist topped the UK software sales charts for two months, in September and October 1985, until it was replaced by Monty on the Run.

The Way of the Exploding Fist became the best-selling computer game of 1985 in the UK. It sold 150,000 copies for the ZX Spectrum by 1987, and a total of 500,000 copies across all platforms in Europe.

The Commodore 64 version received a positive review in Zzap!64 magazine, which called it a "Sizzler" and praised the game's sound and graphics, scoring it 93% overall. Ahoy! said that the Commodore 64 version was "an excellent start for a new software label", with a "good balance of action and strategy" and some of the best graphics of the year. Your Sinclair reviewers praised the visceral sound effects.

=== Accolades ===
The game was voted Game of the Year at the third Golden Joystick Awards, with Melbourne House picking up Best Software House. It also received the "Voted Best Game" award at the Saturday Superstore Viewer Awards. The ZX Spectrum version was placed at number 67 on the "Your Sinclair official top 100" list in 1991. In 1996, GamesMaster ranked the game 76th on their "Top 100 Games of All Time" list.

== Sequels ==
There were two sequels: Fist II: The Legend Continues (1986) and Exploding Fist +. Fist II: The Legend Continues is not a fighting game involving player-versus-player, but a scrolling adventure game with one-on-one fighting elements. Exploding Fist + returns to the style of the first game. It features combat with three characters, an idea followed from International Karate +, though in this case it is possible for players to control the three characters simultaneously.
