= Arcade Wizzard =

Unreleased video game

- Developer: Beam Software
- Publisher: U.S. Gold
- Programmer: Bill McIntosh
- Platform: Commodore 64
- Release: Unreleased
- Genre: Pinball
- Mode: single-player

Arcade Wizzard is an unfinished and unreleased pinball video game developed by Beam Software for the Commodore 64 in 1988, and rediscovered in 2026.

== Gameplay ==
The game has a progression system where players start with access to a limited selection of pinball tables, and beat score and "local arcade "bullies"" to progress. The game includes five arcades, each containing three pinball machines. The arcades are called Top Spin (with tables "Hot Harem", "Mine Dump", and "Drag Strip"), Games ("Desert Queen", "The Mob", "Vegas"), Action City ("Lazer Blazer", "Black Box", "Zipper"), Wonder Dome, and Manic. At least one table, called "Rat Race", was developed in the final two arcades.

== Development ==
The game was programmed by Bill McIntosh, with additional programming by Tony Smales. The game was partly created using the animation engine for the canceled Commodore 64 version of Inspector Gadget and the Circus of Fear. A total of 15 pinball tables were planned. The prototype version includes simple and uncompleted music. The game uses a split screen rather than a scrolling screen, with transitions between the screens described as "very clunky". The right side of the display shows an outline of the entire table.

The game was rediscovered by former Beam Software software developer Tony Smales in 2026.

== Pre-release reception ==
An early version of the game was played by Zzap!64 in 1988. In this version a score target on the first table had to be reached to be able to play the next table. The control method was found to be "very unusual", and the graphics required improvement.
