= William Tang =

William Tang may refer to:

- William Tang (fashion designer) (born 1959), Hong Kong fashion designer
- William Tang (video game designer), author of the Horace computer game series
- William Tang, former guitarist of the Hong Kong rock band Beyond
