= Castle of Terror =

1984 video game

- C64 cover art
- Developer: Beam Software
- Publisher: Melbourne House
- Programmer: Peter Falconer
- Artist: Greg Holland
- Writer: Grahame Willis
- Composer: Neil Brennan
- Platforms: Commodore 64, ZX Spectrum
- Release: 1984
- Genre: Graphic adventure
- Mode: Single-player

Castle of Terror is an interactive fiction game with graphics released for the Commodore 64 and ZX Spectrum by Melbourne House in 1984.

== Gameplay ==
The player is given a quest by an old man at the local tavern to rescue his daughter from the clutches of the local Count (a vampire), who resides in the nearby castle. Throughout the game, the player gathers items, which can then be manipulated to solve various puzzles. The text based interface, coupled with a visual display of the player's location, is similar in style to the Commodore 64 version of The Hobbit.

== Reception ==
The game received notoriety amongst gamers as being impossible to fully complete, namely due to there being no known way to kill the count or achieve a full score of 290 out of 290. Grahame Willis, author of the game, has since revealed that it is not possible to kill the count and that messages suggesting so were placed in the game intentionally to frustrate players.

At the time of its release, it received mixed reviews. Your Commodore praised the game, describing its graphics as "very good" and its playability as "user friendly". Your Computer criticized the game, marking it as "fuzzy" to play. It got a 67% rating from Zzap!64.
