= Terrormolinos =

1985 video game

- Developers: Trevor Lever, Peter Jones
- Publisher: Melbourne House
- Platforms: Acorn Electron, Amstrad CPC, BBC Micro, Commodore 64, ZX Spectrum
- Release: 1985
- Genre: Text adventure
- Mode: Single player

Terrormolinos is a text adventure released by Melbourne House in 1985 for the ZX Spectrum, Commodore 64, Amstrad CPC, BBC Micro and Acorn Electron, all retailing for £7.95.

== Summary ==
The game revolves around surviving a package holiday to the Spanish resort of Terrormolinos (a play on Torremolinos) and bringing back home ten snapshots. The user takes the role of the husband and goes away on a package holiday with wife Beryl and two children, Ken and Doreen. To successfully complete the game, a player must take ten photographs to illustrate the "happy" holiday.

Terrormolinos was a follow-up to Melbourne House's successful Hampstead, produced by the same team with almost identical interface, and using the same style of satirical humour. The magazine adverts for the game said, "Just When You Thought It Was Safe To Have A Holiday ...", referencing the famous tagline from Jaws 2.

== Reception ==
Reception

Awards
Publication	Award
Crash	Crash Smash
Sinclair User	SU Classic

It was reviewed in Crash issue 23 and rated 9/10, a 'Crash Smash'.

The game was written with a modified version of The Quill.
