= List of Net Yaroze games =

PlayStation development kit

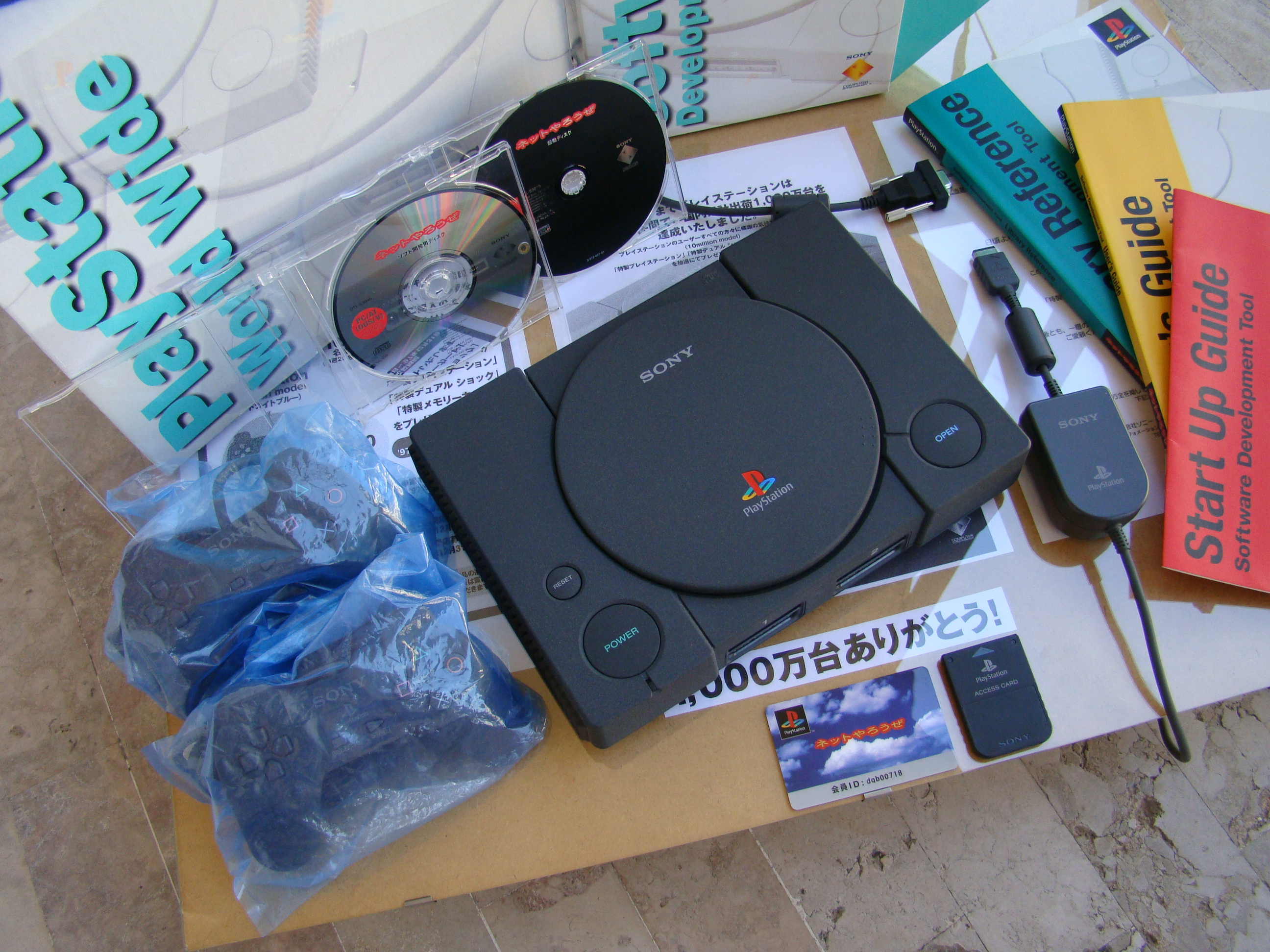
Net Yaroze with software development kit

The Net Yaroze is a development kit for the PlayStation developed and manufactured by Sony Computer Entertainment as a promotion to computer programming hobbyists, first released in Japan in June 1996 and later across Europe and North America in 1997. The following list contains games and demos developed and/or released for the Net Yaroze.

Conceived by PlayStation creator Ken Kutaragi, the kit was retailed at around £550 in Europe and US$750 in North America; The package contained a special black-colored debugging PlayStation unit, a serial cable for connecting the unit to a PC and a CD containing PlayStation development tools, among other items. However, the Net Yaroze lacked many of the features an official PlayStation SDK provided and its primary RAM size was the same as the consumer model; Game code, graphics, audio samples and run-time libraries were limited to fit in the 2MB of primary RAM, 1MB of VRAM and 0.5 MB of sound RAM, since the unit will not play user-burned CDs, a necessary restriction to prevent piracy and ensure that the Yaroze program would not compete with the official PlayStation SDK. The Yaroze could only be purchased via mail order, although Sony also provided it to universities worldwide. Though it lacked regional lockout, three regional variations exists: The European/Australian version boots in PAL mode, while the Japanese and North American versions boot in NTSC mode.

Around 1000 units were sold in Europe and North America respectively but more were sold in Japan. Many games and demos made by hobbyists on the Net Yaroze were released on various demo discs that came along with magazines such as the Official UK PlayStation Magazine and PlayStation Underground. Sony set up an online forum where users could share their homemade games, programming tips and ask questions to Sony's technical support staff. Dedicated Usenet groups, with access restricted to Yaroze members, were maintained by Sony and homepage hosting was also provided. The access was restricted according to the kit's region of origin, which made collaboration between users in different territories impractical. Other games were also distributed online by their authors.

== Games and demos ==
There are currently 136 games and demos on this list. (Note: This number is always up to date by this script.)

Title	Genre(s)	Developer(s)	Year	Ref.
2D Shooting	Shoot 'em up	Shinichi Jiraku	1997	
A Dog Tale	Platform	Ira Rainey	1997	
A Farewell to Kings	Cards	David Johnston, Rob Steward	1999	
Adventure Game	Action-adventure	Robert Swan	1998	
Ai no Yōsei Tomomi-chan	Sports	Kazunari Ishida	1997	
Air Bob	Sports	K. Okada, H. Endo, J. Suehiro, M. Taniguti	1998	
Alien Looter	Shoot 'em up	Ben James	1998	
Amateur Wars: Special Edition	Shooter	Nick Ferguson	1998	
The Appointed Station	Shoot 'em up	Syuntarou Yoshikawa	1996	
Aozora	Demo	David Johnston	1999	
Ape-ocalypse Now	Strategy	Alex Mole	2002	
Arena	Simulation	Tom Madans	2004	
Asobu Rakugaki	Platform	Hideki Kubo, Mineko Kubo	1998	
Ball Blaze	Racing	Gareth Musgrove	1998	
Between The Eyes	Racing	Lewis Evans	1997	
Bike Simulation	Simulation	Olly Read	1998	
Bill's Shooting Game	Shoot 'em up	Takuya Iwano	1997	
Blitter Boy – Operation: Monster Mall	Shooter	Chris Chadwick	1998	
Blockz	Puzzle	Daniel M. Johnson	1998	
Bloodlust	Platform	David Johnston, Mike Goatly	1999	
Bom	Racing	Peter Hardy	1998	
Bom!	Demo	Peter Hardy	1998	
Bouncer 2	Arcade	Scott Evans	1997	
BrainMeasure	Puzzle	Yuichiro Okamura	1997	
Brain Dead	Demo	Olly Read	1998	
Breach	Shoot 'em up	Ben James	1997	
Break 3D	Arcade	Lewis Evans	1997	
BugSplat	Action	John Wojcik	2001	
Car G1	Racing	William Docherty	1997	
Car Tag	Maze	Matthew Follett	1998	
Cars	Racing	Stuart Ashley	1997	
Cat Game	Arcade	Ryunosuke Taki	1997	
Chronicle	Action-adventure	Sidhe Interactive	1998	
Clone	First-person shooter	Stuart Ashley	1997	
Come Baa	Simulation	Nick Slaven	1998	
Constellation Tour	Educational	Takashi Kurosaki	1997	
Decaying Orbit	Shooter	DragonShadow Industries	1999	
Defender	Shooter	Ben James	2001	
Down	Platform	Andy Weissl, Dennis Brinkhuis	2002	
Drapas 2	—N/a	Jiro Kurihara, Toshiharu Araki	1997	
Engine 6	Demo	Derek Leigh-Gilchrist	1997	
Fatal Fantasy VII	Adventure	Team Fatal	1997	
Feedback	Demo	John Rocati	1997	
Fire	Demo	F. Javier Ventoso Reigosa	—N/a	
Flag	Demo	Alex Amsel	1997	
Flying Man	Shooter	Jamie Lewis	1998	
Flood	Puzzle	David Johnston	1999	
Fujiyama	Demo	Team Ginga Spirit	1997	
Funky Beans	Puzzle	Kazunari Ishida	1997	
Gas Girl	Platform	Koji Yoshikawa	1998	
Gasgar vs. Gasgar	Sports	Gregg and Rob Gorczowski	1998	
Gem Hunter	Maze	Casper Nielsen	1998	
GIT	Puzzle	Edward Cawley	2004	
Gravitation	Racing	James Shaughnessy	1998	
Harrier Attack	Shooter	Ben James	—N/a	
Haunted Maze	Maze	Edward Federmeyer	1998	
Henapon	—N/a	T. Tezuka	1997	
Hipower Battlers	Fighting	Kazunari Ishida	1997	
Hover Car Racing	Racing	Richard Smithies	1998	
Hover Racing	Racing	Shuichi Kitaguchi, Tomokazu Sato	1997	
HSFK	Third-person shooter	Cobra Developments	1997	
Insect Puzzle	Puzzle	Yukio Iijima	1997	
The Incredible Coneman	Maze	Lars Barstad, Per Ivar Pedersen	1998	
Invs	Shoot 'em up	Philippe-André Lorin	2002	
It's Vegetable	Shoot 'em up	KBO	1996	
Jeff	Platform	Alex Mole	2002	
Katapila	Platform	Ben James, Elliot Lee	2004	
Katarsis	Puzzle	F. Javier Ventoso Reigosa	1999	
Kyūkyoku Senki Gikadiver	Shoot 'em up	Go Watanabe	1997	
Laydion Limit Breaker	Racing	Hideki Hara	1996	
Le Collage	Racing	Cocotte	1997	
Yaroze Bingo	Cards	Yoshiyoshi Okabe	1997	
Little Wing	Arcade	Hironao Kawabata	1998	
Magic Castle	Roguelike	Kaiga	1998	
Magic Forest	Action	Ben James	—N/a	
Mah Jongg	Puzzle	Gerhard Rittenhofer	1998	
ManicX	Maze	Tuna Technologies	1997	
Mega Demo: Oriental Wave	Demo	Low Tec	1997	
MicroDemo	Demo	F. Javier Ventoso Reigosa	—N/a	
Mi ni Ikuzo! Hedgehog	Platform	Kiyoshi Sakai	1997	
Morph	Demo	F. Javier Ventoso Reigosa	—N/a	
Mud 'n Blood	Action	Nick Ferguson	1998	
My Flower	Action	Makoto Okuzumi	1997	
NaNaTan	Shooter	Yosuke Kuroda	1997	
negiMu?	—N/a	Team Ginga Spirit	1997	
Opera Of Destruction	Shoot 'em up	James Pretorius	1998	
Pandora's Box	Puzzle	Christoph Lurig, Torsten Ventzke	1999	
PingPing	Sports	Matthew Verran	2004	
Pokris	Puzzle	Ryonosuke Taki	1997	
Pssst	Action	Gary Gould, Steve Knock	2001	
Psychon	Run and gun	Ben James	1998	
Pushy IIb	Puzzle	Richard Fred Williams	1998	
RACE	Racing	Robert Swan	1998	
Ricochet	Action	Brian Dawson	1997	
Robot Ron	Shooter	Matthew Verran	2002	
Rocks 'n' Gems	Puzzle	Gerhard Rittenhofer, Manfred Tucmandl	1998	
Roller	Action	Matthew Verran	2004	
Rollpan	—N/a	Team Ginga Spirit	1997	
Sam The Boulder Man	Puzzle	James Hobden	2002	
Samsaric Asymptotes	Shoot 'em up	Philippe-André Lorin	2004	
Sandstorm	—N/a	Omar Nabil Metwally	2001	
Shroud	Shooter	Ben James	2002	
Snave	Shooter	Lewis Evans	1997	
Snowball Fight	Sports	James Rutherford	1998	
Sound 2 Light	Demo	Colin Adams	1997	
Sphere	Puzzle	Peter Dollachan	2002	
Squeak	Puzzle	Ben James	2004	
Squib	Shoot 'em up	Alex Mole	2001	
Star Fighters	Shoot 'em up	George Bain, Jim Black	1997	
Star Guardian	Shoot 'em up	Kazunari Ishida	1997	
STG01	Shoot 'em up	Hideki Hara	1997	
StoneGate	Fighting	F. Javier Ventoso Reigosa	1998	
Super Bub Contest	Puzzle	Alex Herbert	1999	
Super Mansion	Survival horror	Tomokazu Sato	1997	
Super Snail	Platform	David Johnston, Mike Goatly	1999	
Surf Game	Sports	Mark Theyer	2001	
Survival	Action	Pradip K. Fatehpuria	1997	
Tan Tank	Shooter	Team Spirit	1997	
Tan Tank 2	Shooter	Team Spirit	1998	
Tank	Shooter	Paul Wightmore	1998	
Tanx	Strategy	Stuart Macdonald	1999	
Technical Demo X2	Shoot 'em up	Aaron Gandaa, Steven Sheehy	1999	
Terra Incognita	Action-adventure	Team Fatal	1997	
Time Slip	Platform	David Johnston, Mike Goatly	1998	
Total Soccer	Sports	Charles Chapman	1998	
Tokui Waza	Fighting	Omar Nabil Metwally	2001	
Tokui Waza 2	Fighting	Omar Nabil Metwally	2001	
Tunnel Vision	Action	Casper Nielsen	1998	
Turismo Del Mundo	Racing	Omar Nabil Metwally	—N/a	
Video Poker Simulator	Cards	Scott Campbell	1999	
Wabbiiiiit!	Action	Antony Hilton	1998	
War!	Shoot 'em up	Derrick Anthony Bailey	1999	
Wanisan Shooting Game	Shoot 'em up	Wanisan	1997	
Yaroze Rally	Racing	Harvey Cotton	2001	
Yarozians	Shoot 'em up	John Wojcik	2001	
Z2	Action	James Pitts	1998	

== See also ==
- List of PlayStation games (A–L)
- List of PlayStation games (M-Z)
- Lists of video games
