= Dred Scott (disambiguation) =

Dred Scott (c. 1799–1858) was an American slave who unsuccessfully sued for his freedom.

Dred Scott may also refer to:

- Dred Scott v. Sandford, 1857 Supreme Court decision
- Dred Scott (rapper), rapper whose début album, Breakin' Combs, was released in 1994

== See also ==
- Dread Scott, an American artist
- Dred (disambiguation)
- Scott (disambiguation)
