= William Tang (video game designer) =

William Tang (fl. 1980–1986) is a video game author in the 1980s, best known for his ZX Spectrum and Commodore 64 series starring Horace.

== Published works ==
=== Games ===
- Strike Force (TRS-80) (1982)
- Hungry Horace (1982)
- Horace Goes Skiing (1982)
- Horace & The Spiders (1983)
- HURG (1984)
- Mugsy's Revenge (1984)
- The Way of the Exploding Fist (1985), credited for "additional programming"
- Asterix and the Magic Cauldron (1986)

=== Books ===
- Spectrum Machine Language for the Absolute Beginner (1982)

== Horace To The Rescue ==
In 1985 the fourth title in the Horace series, Horace To The Rescue was announced. though this game never appeared. During the development of the game, Tang suffered a collapsed lung.

There is no more current evidence of his involvement in any other titles after Asterix and the Magic Cauldron.

== Horace In The Mystic Woods ==
A fourth Horace game was released, in 1995, titled Horace In The Mystic Woods. The game was not developed by Tang, instead being credited to Michael Ware, and was only available for the Psion Series 3.
