= Power Punch II =

1992 video game

- Cover art
- Developer: Beam Software
- Publisher: American Softworks
- Producer: Sue Anderson
- Programmer: Andrew Bailey
- Artist: Greg Holland
- Composers: Marshall Parker; Gavan Anderson
- Platforms: Nintendo Entertainment System, Windows
- Release: NA: June 1992
- Genre: Sports
- Mode: Single-player

Power Punch II is a 1992 boxing video game developed by Beam Software and published by American Softworks for the Nintendo Entertainment System. The game puts the player in the role of Mark Tyler, an undefeated heavyweight champion on Earth who is invited by an outer space boxing federation to fight the toughest challengers in the universe. Gameplay consists of the player battling each computer-controlled opponent in up to three one-minute rounds and a scoring system based on the player's performance. Training sessions between opponents allow the player to improve stats prior to an upcoming bout.

Power Punch II was initially developed as a Mike Tyson game called Mike Tyson's Intergalactic Power Punch. Prototypes were shown at the Consumer Electronics Show in 1991, however after Tyson was arrested in July 1991, Beam Software quickly removed all mentions of Tyson and released the game as Power Punch II in June 1992. There is a popular rumour that Power Punch II was developed to be a sequel to Punch-Out!! before Nintendo rejected it, however this information is false. The rights to the game were later acquired by Piko Interactive who published the game on Microsoft Windows via Steam. Critical reception for Power Punch II has been negative to average with complaints mostly directed at its graphics, gameplay, and play control. Beam Software would use Power Punch II's engine again with George Foreman's KO Boxing on multiple systems the same year.

== Plot ==
Mark "Tough Guy" Tyler is the undefeated heavyweight champion of the world, with an Olympic gold medal and a 33-0 (30 KO) record to his claim. After knocking out another opponent with ease, Tyler and his manager taunt the world by saying that nobody can stop him. However, the broadcast is picked up far from Earth in the outer reaches of the universe by an alien boxing promoter for the Intergalactic Boxing Federation (IGBF). The promoter decides to accept Tyler's challenge that he can beat "anybody". Thus Tyler is brought into the throes of the universe to compete against the best fighters in the universe and defend his earthly title.

== Gameplay ==
The game includes a scoring system based on punch percentages as well as knockdowns. Rounds are only one minute long.

== Development and release ==
Power Punch II was developed by Melbourne-based Beam Software. The game was allegedly intended as a sequel to Nintendo's 1987 NES release Mike Tyson's Punch-Out!!, which featured the likeness of former heavyweight boxing champion Mike Tyson as its final boss. Similar to Punch-Out!!, Beam Software's project, originally titled Mike Tyson's Intergalactic Power Punch, was to star the eponymous boxer, this time as the player-controlled protagonist. This version of the game was showcased at the Winter 1991 Consumer Electronics Show. However, possibly due to Tyson's rape conviction that same year, the developer modified the game by removing all references to Tyson including changing the player character's name to Mark Tyler. It was picked up and released in North America by publisher American Softworks as Power Punch II despite the game not being an actual sequel.

There has been conflicting information and confusion regarding Nintendo's involvement in the game. While most sources state that it was originally a co-production between Beam Software and Nintendo only for the latter to distance themselves from the project due to Tyson's legal issues, others such as Destructoid dispute this, opining that it made little sense for Nintendo to maintain the licence when they re-released Punch-Out!! without Tyson's likeness in 1990 when their deal with the boxer expired. They did note the mention of Nintendo supposedly owning the trademark to Power Punch II in the game's legal screen, though programmer and character designer Andrew Bailey does not recall having been contracted by Nintendo to develop a Punch Out!! sequel. He stated, "I don't remember it being commissioned by Nintendo. We were working for LJN (from memory) a small US publisher. Of course, Nintendo needed to approve every game, and they would have probably not liked [Mike Tyson's] involvement once the issues came out."

In 2009, a playable prototype ROM of Mike Tyson's Intergalactic Power Punch was released online by a collector after funds were raised from users of a popular Nintendo forum. Piko Interactive eventually acquired the rights to Power Punch II and in 2019 released the game digitally on Steam for Microsoft Windows. Piko Interactive also included the game on a multicart released for the handheld Evercade console the following year.

== Reception ==
Reception

Review scores
Publication	Score
AllGame	3 out of 5
GamePro	3 out of 5
Nintendo Power	3.025 out of 5

Power Punch II received middling reviews from gaming magazines at the time of its original 1992 release. GamePro remarked that it had "slightly better than average 8-bit graphics and challenge" yet that the player's limited moveset lacked realism and that the game became repetitive once each opponent's weakness was found. George Sinfield of Nintendo Power saw the visuals as mediocre and that the control was not very responsive, particularly in training mode. His co-writer Rob Noel criticized the gameplay as inconsistent and unfair as he was unable to defeat even the first opponent by knockout or decision. Noel stated, "I'd like to see made easier for players who are just starting out. It'd be nice to have one easy victory before the bigger challenges."

Retrospective reviews in the decades after have been much more negative. Video Game Bible author Andy Slaven described the game as having "inexcusably bad graphics and horrible control" while Retro Gamer simply described the game as "a terrible stab at doing Punch-Out!! in outer space." Charles P. Gill of Hardcore Gaming 101 criticized the graphics as being better suited for a 1986 release rather than one from 1992 and stated that the gameplay "walks a line between boring and massively frustrating".

== See also ==
- George Foreman's KO Boxing, Beam Software's next boxing game after Power Punch II.
