= Penetrator (video game) =

1982 video game

- Developer: Melbourne House
- Publisher: Melbourne House
- Designers: Philip Mitchell; Veronika Megler
- Platforms: ZX Spectrum, Commodore 64, TRS-80
- Release: 1982
- Genre: Scrolling shooter
- Modes: Single-player, multiplayer

Penetrator is a 1982 horizontally scrolling shooter developed and published by Melbourne House for the ZX Spectrum. Programmed by Philip Mitchell and Veronika Megler, the game is a clone of Konami's 1981 arcade game Scramble. Penetrator was ported to the TRS-80 and Commodore 64.

== Gameplay ==
In Penetrator, the player flies a ship which can shoot forward and drop bombs. Levels scroll from right to left, with a line representing the ground. The first level is in open air, with just mountains to dodge, missiles which try to hit the ship, and animated radars. From the second level onward, the game is inside increasingly complex caverns, so the ceiling is also a danger, as well as new enemies. The missiles are now sometimes replaced with skulls that can move up and down, blocking the path.

The levels flow seamlessly into each other, signified by screen colour changes. After four levels there is a short fifth level where a base needs to be destroyed by dropping a bomb precisely, and then there is a firework animation as a reward. After all levels are finished, the ship goes back through reversed levels. The ultimate level results in a seemingly impassible landscape, however due to a bug if the player accelerates into it, they can get through but the game crashes shortly after.

In addition to the single-player game, there's an alternating two player mode, and a training mode with unlimited lives and access to any of the levels, plus a level editor.

== Reception ==
The Computer Gamer review of the Commodore 64 version in highlighted the versatility of the level editor.

BYTE praised the graphics of the TRS-80 version of Penetrator and described the game as "eminently playable".

In a summary of game genres, Computer and Video Games chose Penetrator as an exemplary Spectrum Scramble-type game, noting the responsive controls and their "thoughtful" layout on the keyboard. One criticism was the slow pace of the title screen: the player is presented with a fireworks display and slowly-drawn title before play can proceed.
