= Shadows of Mordor =

1987 video game

- Amstrad CPC cover art
- Developer: Beam Software
- Publishers: Melbourne House; Addison-Wesley
- Platforms: Amstrad CPC, Apple II, Commodore 64, MS-DOS, Mac, ZX Spectrum
- Release: 1987
- Genre: Text adventure
- Mode: Single-player

Shadows of Mordor: Game Two of Lord of the Rings is a text adventure for the Commodore 64, Amstrad CPC, ZX Spectrum, Apple II, MS-DOS, and Mac. It is based on the second part of The Lord of the Rings story. It is a sequel to Lord of the Rings: Game One and The Hobbit.

The game focuses on Frodo and Sam (with Sméagol as an NPC) on their journey to Mordor to destroy the One Ring. The game is considered an improvement over its predecessor, though still not on par with The Hobbit.

The game was followed by The Crack of Doom in 1989, which was released on Commodore 64, Apple II, MS-DOS, and Mac.

== Reception ==
Macworld reviewed the Macintosh versions of The Hobbit, The Fellowship of the Ring and The Shadows of Mordor simultaneously, criticizing The Hobbit, calling it "particularly clumsy" as it is "handicapped by a 400-word input vocabulary" as opposed to the latter two games' 800 words. Macworld calls The Fellowship of the Ring "particularly intricate" and recommends it as an entry point to the series as opposed to The Hobbit. Macworld praises The Hobbit's graphics, but states that in The Fellowship of the Ring and The Shadows of Mordor the art adds little to the games' overall appeal. Furthermore, Macworld heralds the three games as "literate and faithful in spirit to original books", but criticizes the dated and "rigid" nature of the text-adventure format.
