= Mugsy (video game) =

1984 video game

- Developers: Philip Mitchell; Clive Barrett; Russell Comte
- Publisher: Melbourne House
- Platform: ZX Spectrum
- Release: 1984
- Genre: Business simulation
- Mode: Single-player

Mugsy is a business simulation video game for the 48K ZX Spectrum. It was well-received for its innovative graphic style and was followed two years later by Mugsy's Revenge.

== Gameplay ==
The player takes the role of "Mugsy", an American gangster. The aim of the game is for Mugsy to become "the most powerful gang leader in the city". In each 'turn' of the game, which represents one year, decisions must be made about how much money should be spent on weapons and ammunition to fight other gangs, how many business from which he should attempt to extract protection money, and how much bribery of local law enforcement should take place.

The game was marketed as an "interactive video comic strip"; it was highly visual, with graphics (produced using the software house's own title, Melbourne Draw) intended to be similar to comic book drawings. Information was presented to the player in the form of dialogue between on-screen characters, such as Mugsy himself, and an unnamed assistant. At each decision point, the player enters text into a 'speech bubble' dialogue box.

There is no real plot or narrative arc; each year's activities are essentially the same, with the same decisions to be made by the player. There is a small action element, which is triggered if one of Mugsy's rivals orders a contract killing on him. When this happens, the player controls Mugsy directly, and must shoot the assassins who are sent after him before Mugsy gets shot too many times himself.

== Release ==
The release of the game was preceded by a promotional campaign including actors dressed as gangsters visiting the offices of some computing magazines. It was originally released in 1984 in the UK, by Melbourne House. It was later re-released in Spain by Iveson Software SA. It was priced at £6.95 in the UK, and 1900 pesetas for the Spanish re-released version. In 1986, it was included in a compilation of titles called 'Off The Hook', aimed at raising money to combat drug addiction.

== Reception ==
Reception

Award
Publication	Award
Your Spectrum	Hit of the Month

Reviews of the Spectrum edition were very positive; Your Sinclair's "Joystick Jury" rated it a "hit", citing its impressive graphics, and a structure that, while logical, provided a high level of replayability, as each game ended differently. It was also the winner of a Crash Reader's Award for "Best Strategy and Simulation". The magazine commented positively on the graphics, partly because the visual style was "suited to a game set in the roaring twenties"; this was despite "Mugsy" having to take place before 1919, since that is when its sequel, Mugsy's Revenge, begins.

== Legacy ==
A sequel, Mugsy's Revenge, was published for the ZX Spectrum in 1988 and also released for the Commodore 64 and Amstrad CPC.
