= KKnD (video game) =

1997 video game

KKND: Krush, Kill 'n' Destroy
- Developer: Beam Software
- Publishers: Melbourne House; Electronic Arts
- Platforms: MS-DOS, Windows
- Release: March 5, 1997; October 30, 1997 (Xtreme)
- Genre: Real-time strategy
- Modes: Single-player, multiplayer

KKnD, or Krush, Kill 'n' Destroy is a 1997 real-time strategy video game developed by Beam Software and published by Melbourne House for MS-DOS and Microsoft Windows. The first of three games the KKnD series, it was released on March 5, 1997 in the United States and Australia and March 21, 1997 in Europe. The game was an Australian project from Melbourne-based developer Beam Software.

== Gameplay ==
KKnD takes place in a post-apocalyptic setting, where two factions are fighting for control over the few natural resources left. The single-player campaign chronicles a futuristic war in 2140 from the perspective of one of two factions chosen by the player: humans (the 'Survivors') and mutants (the 'Evolved'). Each faction has its own campaign consisting of 15 missions each. KKnD also features a multiplayer mode which allows up to 6 people to play via LAN or modem/serial connection.

== Release ==
=== Launch ===
Beam Software reported that anticipation for the game was high. A demo, released December 1996, ranked third in international software download charts. KKnD was released in the United States and Australia on March 5, and in Europe on March 21.

=== Sales ===
Beam Software reported the game shipped over 200,000 units in 1996, well in excess of anticipated figures. KKnD met considerable success in international markets. The game was released with localisation for French, German, Spanish and Mandarin-speaking countries, and licensed through Electronic Arts to several international publishers. Beam Software reported that the game was the best-seller in Media Markt German retails sales charts for the week of 21 March 1997. The game was reportedly the third-highest selling computer game in Korea in July 1997.

== Reception ==
Reception

Review scores
Publication	Score
Computer and Video Games	3/5
Edge	8/10
GameSpot	6.2 (KKnD); 5.5 (KKnD: Extreme)
PC PowerPlay	90%
PC Zone	85%

=== Contemporary reviews ===
Reviews of the game upon release were generally positive. David King of PC PowerPlay highly praised the "varied strategy, frenetic action, gorgeous visuals and handy AI" in the game. Edge Magazine stated the game "distinguishes itself as a ubiquitous classic...by virtue of a subtle sense of humour and a superb one-player game, thanks to some brilliantly written AI routines", with the units being "some of the best of the genre". Andy Mitchell of PC Zone praised the "well-produced" nature of the game", with "well designed" levels and more challenging gameplay due to the "speed at which things take place".

Some reviewers were less positive, with many comparing it to the recently released Command & Conquer. Steve Key of Computer & Video Games Magazine dismissed the game as a "blatant Command & Conquer rip off", with identical variations on the same game mechanics. Kraig Kujawa of GameSpot also noted the game followed the "same stale story" as its competitors, and would have "benefited from a little more polishing". Whilst positive in his review, Andy Mitchell of PC Zone noted the game "begs every comparison to Command & Conquer" given that "the basic game structure is almost identical".

=== Retrospective reception ===
Retrospective assessments of the game have varied. Tim Ansell of The Creative Assembly remarked that the game was an "absolute piece of crap" and an example of low-quality clones of Command & Conquer that were outperforming other games in the market. This trend influenced Ansell to enter the real-time strategy genre and develop Shogun: Total War. However, Alex Walker for Kotaku Australia praised the game as "one of the best strategy games to come from Australia and "maybe even a little better than Command & Conquer: Red Alert, singling out its sense of humour, user interface and mission design.

== Reviews ==
- Backstab #6

== Sequels ==
=== KKnD: Extreme ===
KKnD: Xtreme was a revised version of KKnD released on October 14, 1997. Extreme featured new content, including twenty new missions and a 'skirmish mode' ('KAOS') allowing the player to play against the computer on custom maps. It also featured technical improvements, including an improved user interface, expanded network support and tweaks to the AI. In a review of Extreme, Kraig Kujawa of GameSpot argued that whilst the game "fixes some of the original's shortcomings, unfortunately, its improvements prove to be nothing more than a cheap face-lift of a rapidly aging game".

=== KKnD2: Krossfire ===
A sequel, KKND2: Krossfire, was released in 1998.

== Open source remake ==
A fan project aims to make the originals compatible with modern systems while improving online functionality, modding capabilities, support for a broader range of resolutions and operating systems by using the OpenRA engine. The game is openly developed at GitHub. It requires the original assets, which can be bought at online stores like GOG.
