= Hungry Horace =

1982 video game

- Cover art (ZX Spectrum Interface 2 ROM version)
- Developer: Psion Software Limited
- Publisher: Sinclair Research
- Series: Horace
- Platforms: Commodore 64; Dragon 32/64; Timex Sinclair 2068; ZX Spectrum; Microsoft Windows; Android
- Release: 1982
- Genre: Action
- Mode: Single-player

Hungry Horace is a video game developed by Psion Software Ltd. and published by Sinclair Research in 1982 for Commodore 64, Dragon 32/64, Timex Sinclair 2068, ZX Spectrum, and later for Microsoft Windows and Android. It is the first game in the Horace series. The gameplay is noted to be very similar to Pac-Man, involving the collection of food pellets in a maze while avoiding enemies. Hungry Horace was well received upon release.

== Gameplay ==
The second maze of Hungry Horace

Hungry Horace was written as a simple Pac-Man clone, and published in 1982. In this game, Horace must gather food from around a park and move onto the next section while avoiding guards. It is possible to collect a bell to panic the guards and render them vulnerable, like the power pills in Pac-Man. This title was available on the ZX Spectrum, Commodore 64 and Dragon 32. The ZX Spectrum version was marketed and distributed by Sinclair, while the Commodore 64 and Dragon 32 versions were distributed by Melbourne House.

The Commodore 64 version also included a level editor which allowed the player to create, edit and save their own levels. These could be shared with other owners of the game.

A DOS-hosted level editor was written for the ZX Spectrum version in 2009.

Hungry Horace was released on Steam by Pixel Games UK on September 17, 2020.

== Reception ==
Dick Olney for Personal Computer World said "The graphics are excellent, and there are some interesting, if rather limited, sound effects."

John Scriven for Dragon User said "If you like maze chasing with a difference, then I can heartily recommend Horace."

Computer and Video Games said "Horace is one of the stars of computer games. like Miner Willy, Cuthbert, and the Pi-Man, his latest games are looked forward to in the same way as the next instalment of the Star Wars or Rocky sagas."

David Brudenall for Your Computer said "all things considered, it's a marvellous little game, especially for the graphics, and would be especially good for young children."

Commodore Computing International said "Hungry Horace is undoubtedly a good and occasionally funny game."

== Reviews ==
- The ZX Spectrum Book
- Allt om Hemdatorer (Swedish)
- Popular Computing Weekly - Jan 06, 1983
- Popular Computing Weekly - Dec 22, 1983
- Happy Computer - Aug, 1984
