= Baby T-Rex =

1993 video game

- Developer: Beam Software
- Publishers: Laser Beam Entertainment; Hi Tech Expressions
- Producer: Alfred Milgrom
- Designer: Ian Malcolm
- Programmer: David Theodore
- Artists: Greg Holland; Joe Rimmer; Jeremy Kupsch; Darren Hanna; Joe Rimmer
- Composer: Marshall Parker
- Platform: Game Boy
- Release: Baby T-Rex: EU: 1993; Agro Soar: AU: 1993; Bamse: SWE: 16 December 1993; We're Back! A Dinosaur’s Story: NA: November 1993
- Genre: Platform
- Mode: Single-player

Baby T-Rex is a platform game developed by Beam Software for Game Boy. It was released in 1993 in Europe by Laser Beam Entertainment, Beam's publishing arm. The same underlying game was released under alternate titles each adapting a different intellectual property: Agro Soar in Australia, Bamse in Sweden, and We're Back! A Dinosaur's Story in North America, where it was published by Hi Tech Expressions.

The following year Beam released a follow-up, Radical Rex, for Super NES, Sega Genesis and Sega CD, which in 2022 was bundled with the Game Boy game in a compilation for various platforms.

== Gameplay ==
The player character traverses various sidescrolling levels with platforming gameplay.

== Plot ==
In the original, Baby T-Rex version of the game, an anthropomorphic skateboarding dinosaur must save his girlfriend from the evil wizard Sethron.

In the Agro Soar version of the game, Agro tries to escape a "pre-historic cartoon within his own TV" in which he is trapped by Sethron after he had insulted the wizard while watching the television show Curse of Sethron.

The Bamse version of the game sees Bamse, the world's strongest bear, and his rabbit friend Lille Skutt rescuing the inventor tortoise Skalman from the mischievous wolf Vargen after Skalman transports them 75 millions of years back in time to the age of the dinosaurs in a time machine he has built.

In the We're Back! A Dinosaur's Story version of the game, Rex, a Tyrannosaurus rex with enhanced intelligence must rescue his three dinosaur friends Woog, Elsa and Dweeb from the film's villain Professor Screweyes.

== Development ==
Beam actively sought to adapt the game for a number of different licensed properties in different countries around the world. Subsequently, the game was also released as We're Back! A Dinosaur's Story, based on the 1993 film of the same name in North America, Bamse, based on the Swedish children's character Bamse and the comics featuring him, in Sweden, and Agro Soar, which stars the puppet children's television show host Agro from Beam's home country of Australia. These versions changed the story and the graphics (most notably the main character sprite, cutscenes and the title screen) to fit the license but kept the gameplay, level design and music intact.

Beam had also unsuccessfully pitched versions featuring the characters Sooty, Hugo and The Smurfs at various European trade fairs. A version of the game featuring Edd the Duck was completed and reviewed by Game Zone magazine in Britain but was pulled from distribution just before release when the BBC revoked the license. Decades later a ROM of the game was leaked onto the internet as part of the 2020 Nintendo data leak.

The game uses an in-house developed engine that was previously used in a Tom and Jerry game.

== Reception ==
All versions of the game received average reviews.
