= Radical Rex =

1994 video game

- North American SNES box art
- Developer: Beam Software
- Publishers: NA/EU: Activision; EU: Laser Beam Entertainment (SNES)
- Director: Cameron Brown
- Producer: Tom Sloper
- Designer: Ian Malcolm
- Programmers: Andrew Harvey; Tim McKay; Peter Litwiniuk
- Artists: Damian Borg; Joe Rimmer
- Composer: Marshall Parker
- Platforms: Super Nintendo Entertainment System, Sega Genesis, Sega CD
- Release: Super NES: NA: November 1994; EU: 1994; Sega Genesis: EU: November 1994; NA: 1994; Sega CD: NA: 1995
- Genre: Platform
- Modes: Single-player, multiplayer

Radical Rex is a 1994 platform video game developed by Beam Software for the Super Nintendo Entertainment System (SNES), Sega Genesis, and Sega CD. It is a remake of the 1993 Game Boy game Baby T-Rex.

A Microsoft Windows port of the SNES version published by Piko Interactive was released on March 7, 2019. Piko also released the game as part of the Piko Interactive Collection 1 for the Evercade on June 8, 2020.

== Gameplay ==
The game stars Radical Rex, a skateboarding, fire-breathing Tyrannosaurus rex who must save his land, and his girlfriend Rexanne, from an evil magician named Sethron. In his way are dinosaurs, sea creatures, and other monsters.

Rex has a few abilities, including a roar that kills or hurts all enemies on screen, a fire breath which can temporarily immobilize enemies, and a bubble spray which he can use while underwater. Sethron is replaced by a weasel-like mammal named Skriitch in the Genesis and Sega CD versions. Despite this, the weasel acts the same as its SNES Counterpart.

== Reception ==
Reception

Review scores
Publication	Score
Electronic Gaming Monthly	5.5/10 (SNES); 5/10, 5/10, 5/10, 6/10 (Sega CD)
Next Generation	1/5 (SNES)
Nintendo Life	3.4/5 (SNES)

Reviewing the Super NES version, GamePro's Bonehead complained that the music becomes repetitive and the player character's skateboard "goes so fast you often miss power-ups and jumps", but praised the cutesy and humorous graphics and the simple enjoyability of the gameplay, and summarized the game as "about as good and as endearing" as the successful Joe and Mac games. A reviewer for Next Generation, on the other hand, gave it a thoroughly negative assessment. He criticized the incongruity between the cheerful, goofy player character and the murky background graphics, and said that though he agreed the gameplay is often reminiscent of Joe and Mac, he called it flat, unmotivating and not in par with other platform games.

GamePro wrote that the Genesis version has slightly less colorful graphics and more muffled sound effects than the Super NES version, and is missing the entertaining intro rap, but that it retains all the essential elements that made the game fun. They concluded that it would appeal to younger gamers but is too easy and cutesy for older gamers. For Sega CD version, they commented that some of the levels and enemies are new, but the graphics and sounds are virtually identical to those on the SNES and Genesis. The four reviewers of Electronic Gaming Monthly were more critical, saying the game had nothing but its CD quality soundtrack to justify its presence on the Sega CD. They also criticized the lack of polish in the gameplay and controls.

Sega-16 gave the Mega-CD version a 4.0 out of 10.0 as it was criticized for utilizing the "extreme bad attitude" fad that was being popular through pop culture throughout the 1990s, that the game has offered and also claimed to have a lack of originality. It was also criticized for having repetitive straightforward platforming elements within its gameplay and graphics, cheap obstacles and frustratingly difficult bosses.
