= Judge Dredd (1991 video game) =

1991 video game

- Developer: Random Access
- Publisher: Virgin Mastertronic
- Platforms: Amiga; Atari ST; Commodore 64; ZX Spectrum
- Release: EU: 1991
- Genres: Platform, shoot 'em up
- Mode: Single-player

Judge Dredd is a 1991 platform shoot 'em up video game based on the character of the same name. It was developed by Random Access and published by Virgin Mastertronic. It was released in Europe in 1991, for the Amiga, Atari ST, Commodore 64, and ZX Spectrum. Critics found the gameplay repetitive.

== Gameplay ==
Judge Dredd is a platform shoot 'em up game played across six levels set in the fictional Mega-City One. Playing as Judge Dredd, the player must stop criminals and face off against enemies at the end of each level, including Orlok and the Dark Judges. The player's weapon is Judge Dredd's Lawgiver gun, which has three types of ammo. The player must be aware of the city's crime rate, which gradually rises as the game progresses. If the crime rate becomes too high, the player loses. The player can ride around on Judge Dredd's Lawmaster bike for faster transportation, although using it will rapidly increase the crime rate, and the player cannot use weapons while riding it. Killing civilians also increases the crime rate. A bonus subgame is played after completing each level.

== Development and release ==
In 1989, Virgin Mastertronic acquired the licence to publish a video game based on the Judge Dredd character. The game was developed by Random Access, the programming team for The Sales Curve. Simon Pick was the project manager. Pick had finished work on the Commodore 64 (C64) version of Shinobi, and he "had the vague idea that we'd just make a similar game, but styled to the Dredd universe. That seemed like a good idea until someone noted that Judge Dredd never jumped, at which point we should have given up on the idea of making it a platform game." The development team proceeded with the idea and created mockups, but was unable to make them work in the game because of technical reasons. Ultimately, the team implemented orthographic projection designs into the game, but the release of the game was delayed until early 1991. Judge Dredd was released in Europe for the Amiga, Atari ST, C64, and ZX Spectrum. A version was also created for the Amstrad CPC. Reviews were published for the ZX Spectrum and CPC versions, but both were once believed to be unreleased. A copy of the ZX Spectrum version eventually surfaced on eBay in the mid 2010s.

== Reception ==
Reception

Review scores
Publication	Score
Crash	78% (ZX Spectrum)
Computer and Video Games	54% (ZX Spectrum); 55% (Atari ST)
Sinclair User	63% (ZX Spectrum)
Your Sinclair	74/100 (ZX Spectrum)
Zzap!64	37% (Amiga); 53% (C64)
Amiga Joker	57% (Amiga)
Amiga Power	1/5 (Amiga)
Commodore Format	56% (C64)
CU Amiga	66% (Amiga)
Micro Hobby	51% (ZX Spectrum)
ST Format	41% (Atari ST)
Zero	78% (Amiga)

Judge Dredd received average reviews. The gameplay was particularly criticized for being repetitive. Commodore Format called the gameplay "atrocious" and stated that it suffered from "gross unplayability," writing that the crime rate "accelerates too rapidly." CU Amiga considered the gameplay dull and wrote that the crime rate indicator "seems to have a mind of its own and doesn't follow any particular pattern." Reviewers for Zzap!64 were critical of the crime rate difficulty on the Amiga version, but they found the C64 version to be easier. ACE was also critical of the gameplay, but wrote that the game, "Does a reasonable job of capturing some of the graphic humour" of the comic series. Your Sinclair called it a "nice attempt to capture the flavour of the character." CU Amiga wrote that the game failed to capture the feel and action of the comic books.

Robert Swan of Computer and Video Games considered it an improvement over an earlier Judge Dredd game, while CU Amiga considered both games substandard. Amiga Power considered it to be, "Another Judge Dredd game screwed up totally." Crash stated that it was better than the previous Judge Dredd game. Garth Sumpter of Sinclair User wrote that the game "may not set any new standards for graphics, sound or gameplay, but it's full of authentic Dreddian detail which should appeal to fans." Swan stated that the game was "full of glaring inaccuracies", such as the lack of weapons on the Lawmaster bike "which will leave any Dredd fans disappointed."

Zzap!64 criticized the graphics of the Amiga version but praised them on the C64. Commodore Format and Zero respectively praised the graphics of the C64 and Amiga versions. Other reviewers were critical of the graphics featured in the Atari ST and ZX Spectrum versions. Andy Hutchinson of ST Format wrote that the game visually "fails because it doesn't make enough of the cartoon style," describing Judge Dredd's animation as "very average" and stating that he "sometimes looks as if he's moonwalking". Hutchinson, however, praised the "smooth and seamless" scrolling and the "attractive" backgrounds. In a review of the CPC version, John Taylor of Amstrad Computer User praised the graphics and scrolling.

Zzap!64 criticized the music, and Hutchinson was critical of the sound. Zero praised the "neat intro screens and music".
