= KKND2: Krossfire =

1998 video game

- Developer: Beam Software
- Publishers: AU/EU: Melbourne House; NA: GT Interactive
- Platforms: Windows, PlayStation
- Release: Windows: GER: June 1998; EU: August 24, 1998; NA: October 19, 1998; AU: October 23, 1998; PlayStation: EU: October 1998; UK: April 15, 1999
- Genre: Real-time strategy
- Modes: Single-player, multiplayer

KKnD2: Krossfire is a real-time strategy video game developed by Beam Software and published by Melbourne House in 1998 for Microsoft Windows. It was later released for the PlayStation in Europe in late 1998 to early 1999 as KKnD: Krossfire. A direct sequel to KKnD in the KKnD series, it is set in the year 2179, 100 years after the Nuclear World War. After spending another four decades underground, the Survivors rose up to a new enemy: the Series 9. The Series 9 robots are machines that have advanced from their farming origins (having the original programming damaged by the nuclear radiation) and taken up arms against the humans, Evolved and Survivor, who destroyed their precious crops, their one and only reason for functioning.

== Gameplay ==
Gameplay takes place after a worldwide nuclear war, on three map-types over land and water: a barren desert terrain, forest areas, or urban jungles. All three areas provide artifacts from the nuclear war, namely decrepit buildings and polluted water.

Like other real-time strategy games such as the Command and Conquer or Starcraft franchises, the primary objective of the game is to eradicate all other factions on a particular playing map. This is done usually through resource management—oil reserves acting as a power source—and maintaining a base of operations while trying to destroy everything else. Fortifications and turrets can be used to protect a base, as well as making use of natural features such as cliffs or buildings. Unlike in KKnD, now each faction has buildings that can provide a little more resource units at a constant rate, helping to gather resources, should there be a shortage of oil or if all oil runs out.

There are two methods of gameplay: a campaign mode and a multiplayer mode. The campaign mode allows you to play one of three factions, fighting through a triangle-shaped map in order to eradicate all other enemies. Occasionally there can be multiple factions. Multiplayer mode allows for connection through LAN (IPX or TCP/IP), serial cable or modem, or a soloplay mode where one can choose between a variety of maps and settings to play a practice game against one or more AI opponents.

== Factions ==
=== Survivors ===
The Survivors are the remnants of normal mankind that hid in underground bunkers during the first war for the surface. Once they saw how badly the first war for the surface was going, they returned to their shelters and have since been digging and building new weapons, new structures, new technologies and new ways to wage war. Determined to exterminate the "Evolved" and shut down the "Series 9", they must use their new technologies and units to overcome, overpower and overwhelm the enemy.

=== Evolved ===
The Evolved were on the surface during the Nuclear War, and mutated because of the radiation. While nowhere near as technologically advanced as their enemies, they have learned to herd and utilize the power of other mutated creatures, such as large wasps and scorpions. The mutants are very religious and believe that their gods (also known as the Scourge) were punishing them for their ignorance, use of technology, politics and the repeated use of TV. The Evolved are trying to eliminate the "symmetrics" (the "Survivors") and the "soulless ones" ("Series 9") in order to appease their gods. Notably, whereas the other two factions have parallel units, The Evolved have a special "Scourge Demon" unit, at the highest tech level, which can be constructed by sacrificing five infantry units.

=== The Series 9 ===
The Series 9 are advanced farming robots that have become sick of the Survivors destroying their crops and have taken it upon themselves to destroy all organic life, so they can finally farm in peace. When the Series 9 finally gained their own conscience, they became aware that the earlier robots (Series 1-8) were still following their last orders from the humans. The Series 9 robots decided to shut down the other model lines in order to complete their goal. They were active during the first war, but realized that pitchforks and wheelbarrows weren't going to do much against tanks and mutant Mastodons. They took the time to research Earth's old weapons and wars from history in order to adapt their tools to become formidable armaments. They are farming robots, and as such much of their weaponry resembles farm tools, like the Seeder, Weed Killer, and Spore Missile. This faction is new to the franchise.

== Reception ==
Reception

Aggregate score
Aggregator	Score	
Aggregator	PC	PS
GameRankings	64%	N/A

Review scores
Publication	Score	
Publication	PC	PS
CNET Gamecenter	7/10	N/A
Computer Games Strategy Plus	3/5	N/A
Computer Gaming World	3.5/5	N/A
Game Informer	7.5/10	N/A
GameSpot	5.7/10	N/A
GameStar	74%	N/A
Jeuxvideo.com	15/20	12/20
PlayStation Official Magazine – UK	N/A	6/10
PC Accelerator	7/10	N/A
PC Gamer (UK)	76%	N/A
PC Gamer (US)	80%	N/A
PC Zone	66%	N/A

The PC version received mixed reviews according to the review aggregation website GameRankings.

== Sequel/Spin-Off ==
A spin-off named KKnD: Infiltrator was being developed in 1999, but cancelled later. It would have been a 3D action game, in which the player drove a dirtbike into enemy territory to do missions as an Infiltrator (hence the name).
