= The Muncher =

1988 video game

- Developer: Beam Software
- Publisher: Gremlin Graphics
- Platforms: Commodore 64, ZX Spectrum
- Release: 1988
- Genre: Action
- Mode: Single-player

The Muncher is a video game for the Commodore 64 and ZX Spectrum published in 1988 by Gremlin Graphics. It was developed by Beam Software. The game involves the monster from Chewits attacking modern day Japan.

== Gameplay ==
The objective is to cause as much destruction as possible in a 2D setting town. Points are awarded for various buildings destroyed. The monster has fire breath and can destroy buildings in this way.

== Reception ==
Reception

Review scores
Publication	Score
Crash	80%
Sinclair User	94%
Your Sinclair	8/10
Zzap!64	71%

The game received generally favorable reviews, with Mark Caswell of Crash magazine calling it "g-r-r-rreat stomping, frazzling, crushing fun!" Duncan MacDonald of Your Sinclair called it "A large sprite, prehistoric mega-romp and smash-em up with the emphasis on total destruction," but warned the reader, claiming the game had a "syrupy control response."

== Legacy ==
The full version of The Muncher was included in the December 1992 issue of Commodore Format magazine.
