= George Foreman's KO Boxing =

1992 video game

- North American NES box art
- Developers: SIMS (GG, MS); Beam Software (GB, SNES, NES, Genesis)
- Publisher: Acclaim Entertainment (Note: Released under the Flying Edge brand on Sega systems)
- Designer: Graeme Scott
- Composers: Marshall Parker; Andrew Bailey
- Platforms: Game Gear, Master System, Game Boy, Super NES, NES, Genesis
- Release: Game Gear: NA: May 1992; EU: 1992; Master System: EU: 1992; Game Boy, Super NES: NA/EU: September 1992; NES: NA: December 1992; Genesis: NA: January 1993; EU: April 1993
- Genre: Sports
- Modes: Single-player, multiplayer

George Foreman's KO Boxing is a sports video game produced by Acclaim, featuring boxer George Foreman, released in 1992. Three years later, Acclaim released another game with Foreman: Foreman For Real.

== Gameplay ==
In the 16-bit and Nintendo 8-bit versions, the player assumes the role of George Foreman, who, at 43 years old, is pursuing a quest to become the undisputed heavyweight champion of the world by uniting the title belts of three fictional boxing circuits. Gameplay is almost identical to Beam's previous boxing game, Power Punch II: players are given the option to block the opponent's attempted punches, evade in two different directions, and throwing a wide variety of punches. Victory in a match can be won by knockout, technical knockout or by decision. A knockout requires a boxer to knock his opponent down four times in a three-round match; on the fourth knockdown, the downed boxer will fail to answer the 10-count. A technical knockout is awarded if a boxer is knocked down three times in a single round. If neither of these occur by the end of the third and final round, one boxer is declared the winner by a judge's decision, which is determined by each boxer's punches thrown and landed, knockdowns and total damage done.

In the 16-bit versions, a portrait of each boxer accompanies their energy meters. These portraits become progressively battered and bloody as the fighters take damage. A password system is used in career mode to save progress in the game in lieu of battery backup.

== Versions ==
The two 16-bit versions of KO Boxing were developed by Beam Software for the Super Nintendo Entertainment System and the Sega Genesis, in 1992. Beam Software also developed the Game Boy and the Nintendo Entertainment System versions. The versions for Master System and Game Gear are different, and are based on the Master System version of Heavyweight Champ, which was released in North America as the 8-bit version of James "Buster" Douglas Knockout Boxing.

== Reception ==
Reception

Aggregate score
Aggregator	Score
GameRankings	41% (SNES); 39.75% (GB)

Review scores
Publication	Score
Total!	20% (Game Boy)
Mega	35%

The game was poorly received. Mega said that "the dire gameplay and abysmal graphics make this a game to avoid." Total! reviewer James Beaven went as so far to call it "worse than wrestling games," panning its "jerky" animation and overwhelming difficulty: "the only reason this scored anything was because you can move George a bit." Super Gamer magazine gave the game a review score of 46% stating "George looks the business in the ring restrained beat-'em-up, but not enough moves." Super Play gave an overall score of 18%, they criticized the gameplay saying there is little opportunity to dodge the opponent's punches and the limited movement from the main character, they also gave criticism to the graphics calling it annoying and ropy concluding: "Useless boxing game that’s a strong contender for the worst SNES release of all time." Nintendo Game Zone reviewed the SNES version and gave a score of 60%, they criticized the game's graphics being poor, the inability to move in the ring, lack luster gameplay and the lack of different moves concluding: "Fun, Laughter, and great games play. All these things aren’t to be found in George Foreman's KO Boxing."
