= Mugsy's Revenge =

1986 video game

- Developers: William Tang, Neil Brennan, Russell Comte, David O'Callaghan, Mike Robinson, Michael Gilmour
- Publisher: Melbourne House
- Platforms: ZX Spectrum, Commodore 64, Amstrad CPC
- Release: 1986
- Genre: Business simulation
- Mode: Single-player

Mugsy's Revenge is a business simulation video game for the ZX Spectrum, Commodore 64 and Amstrad CPC that was released in 1986. It is effectively a sequel to the earlier Mugsy by the same publisher, and has many of the same features, in both design, and setting.

== Gameplay ==
The player takes the role of 'Mugsy', a gangster who has just been released from prison. The game begins in 1919, and the aim of the game is for Mugsy to make a fortune from the bootleg smuggling business, which has been generated as a result of prohibition. In each turn of the game, which represents one year, decisions must be made about how much illegal alcohol to buy, which staff to assign to which activity, and how much money to spend on bribing law enforcement. Surviving for ten years means that the game ends, with the repeal of prohibition.

Like the earlier Mugsy game, the graphics are in the style of comic books. Information is presented to the player in the form of dialogue between on-screen characters. At each decision point, the player enters text into a dialogue box.

There is an action minigame triggered if one of Mugsy's rivals orders a contract killing on him. The player controls Mugsy directly and must shoot the assassins who are sent after him before Mugsy gets shot too many times himself.

== Release ==
The game was released at a price of £8.95 for the Commodore and Amstrad versions, and £7.95 for the Spectrum.

== Reception ==
Reviews of the Spectrum edition were generally warm, and many compared it unfavourably to the original Mugsy. While many reviews were positive about the graphics, gameplay was seen as repetitive. Scores out of ten from magazines were 7 (Your Sinclair), 6 (Crash) and 8 from Sinclair User.

The Commodore reviews were less positive, ranging from 2 out of 10 from Your Commodore, to 6 out of 10 in Computer and Video Games.
