= Grand Prix Challenge =

2002 video game

- Developer: Infogrames Melbourne House (Note: Additional work by Torus Games.)
- Publisher: Infogrames (Note: Released under the Atari brand name.)
- Platform: PlayStation 2
- Release: EU: 22 November 2002; AU: 28 February 2003; NA: 3 March 2003; JP: 22 May 2003
- Genre: Racing simulation
- Modes: Single-player, multiplayer

Grand Prix Challenge is a Formula One racing video game developed by Australian developer Infogrames Melbourne House and published by Infogrames for PlayStation 2. An Xbox version was also in development but never released. It was released in Europe on 22 November 2002, and was officially licensed by Formula One Administration. It was later released on 28 February 2003 in New Zealand and Australia, 3 March in North America and 22 May in Japan.

The game features all the drivers, cars and circuits from the 2002 Formula One season. Australian developer Torus Games also supplied the art for the Silverstone (UK), Magny-Cours (France) and Montreal (Canada) racing tracks. Cars in the game are made of around 17,000 polygons.

== Game modes ==
There are 4 levels of AI to compete against, variable weather conditions, fuel usage, tire wear, interactive pitstops and various car setups.

- Time Trial
- Single Grand Prix (practice/qualifying/warm-up/race)
- Championship (competing in a 17-race season to become FIA Formula One World Champion)
- Grand Prix Challenge (series of 10 mini-championships which increase in difficulty each time)
- Multiplayer (2-player splitscreen)

== Reception ==
Reception

Aggregate score
Aggregator	Score
Metacritic	76/100

Review scores
Publication	Score
Famitsu	27/40
Game Informer	7.5/10
GamesMaster	87%
GameSpot	7.9/10
IGN	9/10
PlayStation Official Magazine – UK	6/10
Official U.S. PlayStation Magazine	3.5/5
PlayStation: The Official Magazine	6/10
PSM3	85%
X-Play	4/5

The game received "generally favourable reviews" according to the review aggregation website Metacritic. In Japan, Famitsu gave it a score of 27 out of 40.
