= Foreman For Real =

1995 video game

- Super NES cover art
- Developer: Software Creations of America
- Publisher: Acclaim Entertainment
- Director: Stephen Ruddy
- Producer: Jeff Carnell
- Designers: Jeff Carnell; Brian Ulrich
- Programmer: Stephen Ruddy
- Artist: David McLachlan
- Composers: Chris Jojo; Paul Tonge; Suddi Raval
- Platforms: Game Boy, Game Gear, Sega Genesis, Super NES
- Release: Game Boy: NA: September 1995; EU: 1995; Super NES: NA: September 1995; EU: 1995; Game Gear: NA: October 1995; Genesis: NA: October 1995; EU: 1995
- Genre: Sports (boxing)
- Mode: Single-player

Foreman For Real (フォアマン フォーリアル, Foaman Fō Riaru) is a 1995 boxing video game for the Game Boy, Game Gear, Sega Genesis, and the Super Nintendo Entertainment System featuring George Foreman. It is the follow-up to Acclaim's previous release, George Foreman's KO Boxing. The game was met with negative reviews which criticized the simplistic and unexciting gameplay and low production values.

== Gameplay ==
The game uses digitized representations of boxers, including Foreman himself.

This game is similar to the arcade game Punch-Out!! and consists of three different modes (exhibition, career, and tournament). Players can choose between three rounds (as in amateur boxing) and 12 rounds (as in professional boxing). Acclaim's proprietary graphics technology was used to create photorealistic digital representations of the boxers. Two camera views are available. Career mode has the player start out as the bottom of the world rankings and winning fights makes him move up the ladder until he has to face off against George Foreman for the world heavyweight championship belt. This makes the game similar to the career modes found in most modern sports games. All of the fighters can earn money and are ranked based on their offense and defense. Passwords allow careers to be resumed from certain spots in the game.

A coach gives advice on the strengths and weaknesses of each opponent. Punches and jabs are available with several variations. In addition, an AI-controlled judge helps to determine the score of each and every round.

== Reception ==
Greasy Gus of GamePro remarked that while the Super NES version has faster gameplay and better character graphics than the Genesis version, it is still mediocre in absolute terms, with unengaging gameplay and a crowd which shows no reaction to developments in the fight. He summarized "A school bus full of Don Kings couldn't generate any excitement for this fight." The same magazine's Tommy Glide reviewed the Genesis version. He likewise commented on the "stiff gameplay", and severely criticized the audio: "The average music severely drowns out the sound effects in each fight. You won't hear the ref count on knockdowns, the punch effects sound like bad kung fu noises from '70s films, the crowd's silent, and the round bell sounds like someone tapping a children's toy piano." A reviewer for Next Generation slammed the Genesis version as well, commenting that the gameplay ultimately comes down to blindly mashing buttons. He gave it one out of five stars, summarizing that "There seems to be no real effort put into any single aspect of this title, and the end result is arguably one of the poorer boxing efforts ever released." Video Games The Ultimate Gaming Magazine gave the game a score of 5 out of 10, giving some praise to the graphics although giving criticism to the playability, the game speed, lack of variety and concluding, "Don't waste your time with this game when you could just as easily pick up Electronic Arts Foes of Ali."
