= Rock'n Wrestle =

1985 video game

- Developer: Beam Software
- Publishers: Melbourne House, Mindscape
- Designers: Gregg Barnett, Bruce Bayley, Cameron Duffy, Damien Watharow
- Composer: Neil Brennan
- Platforms: Apple II, Atari 8-bit, Commodore 64, ZX Spectrum, Amstrad CPC, MS-DOS
- Release: 1985
- Genre: Wrestling
- Modes: Single-player, multiplayer

Rock'n Wrestle is a professional wrestling video game released in 1985 for the ZX Spectrum, Amstrad and Commodore 64, and as Bop'N Wrestle in 1986 for Atari 8-bit and MS-DOS by Mindscape.

== Reception ==
Rick Teverbaugh reviewed the game for Computer Gaming World, and stated that "Bop 'N Wrestle is a game with some stunning graphics. It is also a well-timed release now that championship wrestling is now a network staple. But, unfortunately, it is a game that tries to do too much."

== See also ==
- List of licensed professional wrestling video games
