= Lord of the Rings: Game One =

1985 video game

- European cover art
- Developer: Beam Software
- Publisher: Melbourne House
- Designer: Philip Mitchell
- Platforms: ZX Spectrum, Commodore 64, Amstrad CPC, Amstrad PCW, BBC Micro, Apple II, Macintosh, MS-DOS.
- Release: 1985
- Genre: Interactive fiction
- Mode: Single-player

Lord of the Rings: Game One (released in North America as The Fellowship of the Ring: A Software Adventure) is a video game released in 1985 and based on the book The Fellowship of the Ring, by J. R. R. Tolkien. It was the follow-up to the 1982 game The Hobbit. To promote the game, Melbourne House commissioned hologram picture of a Nazgûl from a company called Holographix. It was available to purchase from Melbourne House directly using an order form on the instruction booklet included with the game. A sequel, Shadows of Mordor: Game Two of Lord of the Rings, was released in 1987.

== Reception ==
Reception

Awards
Publication	Award
Crash	Crash Smash
Sinclair User	SU Classic
Your Sinclair	Megagame

Macworld reviewed the Macintosh versions of The Hobbit, The Fellowship of the Ring and The Shadows of Mordor simultaneously, criticizing The Hobbit, calling it "particularly clumsy" as it is "handicapped by a 400-word input vocabulary" as opposed to the latter two games' 800 words. Macworld calls The Fellowship of the Ring "particularly intricate" and recommends it as an entry point to the series as opposed to The Hobbit. Macworld praises The Hobbit's graphics, but states that in The Fellowship of the Ring and The Shadows of Mordor the art adds little to the games' overall appeal. Furthermore, Macworld heralds the three games as "literate and faithful in spirit to original books", but criticizes the dated and "rigid" nature of the text-adventure format.

According to Beam Software, the game was a commercial success.
