= Veronika Megler =

Australian computer scientist

- Born: Veronika Margaret Megler; 14 October 1960 (age 66)
- Education: Mac.Robertson Girls' High School
- Alma mater: University of Melbourne (BSc); Portland State University (MSc, PhD)
- Scientific career
- Fields: Computer science • data science
- Workplaces: Beam Software; IBM; Amazon
- Thesis: Ranked Similarity Search of Scientific Datasets: An Information Retrieval Approach (2014)
- Doctoral advisor: David E. Maier
- Website: www.veronikamegler.com

Veronika Margaret Megler (born 14 October 1960) is an Australian computer scientist. As of 2024, Megler is a principal data scientist at Amazon.com and the co-developer of The Hobbit, a 1982 text adventure game adapted from the novel by J. R. R. Tolkien.

== Education ==
Megler was born in 1960, and educated in Melbourne at Mac.Robertson Girls' High School, where she was school valedictorian in science. She began studying science at the University of Melbourne, intending to major in statistics but switching to a computer science major which she found more enjoyable.

== Beam Software ==
Megler became the first employee at video game development studio Beam Software/Melbourne House as a programmer. She recruited Philip Mitchell and the two began working on an illustrated interactive fiction game based on The Hobbit by J. R. R. Tolkien, with Megler concentrating on the game's physics system and a measure of autonomy for non-player characters.

This game was structured to be used as the basis for other games as an early adaptable game engine. The game was released in 1982 in the UK and Australia.

Megler and Mitchell also developed another Beam game, Penetrator, also released in 1982.

== Computer science career ==
Prior to her graduation from the University of Melbourne, Megler resigned from Beam to concentrate on her studies, and Mitchell remained to complete the ZX Spectrum version. Megler worked at IBM as an information technology architect, operating system expert and consultant. In 2009, she left IBM to study for a master's degree and PhD in computer science for scientific big data at Portland State University.

As of February 2024, Megler lives in Portland, Oregon and is a principal data scientist at Amazon.com. In her interview in MLinProduction in 2020 as part of a series with creators of top machine learning resources, she explains that this recent work focuses on managing larger and higher-impact machine learning projects.

== Publications and journal articles ==
- Megler, V.M., Maier, D. (2011). Finding Haystacks with Needles: Ranked Search for Data Using Geospatial and Temporal Characteristics. In: Bayard Cushing, J., French, J., Bowers, S. (eds) Scientific and Statistical Database Management. SSDBM 2011. Lecture Notes in Computer Science, vol 6809. Springer, Berlin, Heidelberg.
- V. M. Megler and D. Maier, "Data Near Here: Bringing Relevant Data Closer to Scientists," in Computing in Science & Engineering, vol. 15, no. 3, pp. 44–53, May–June 2013.
- Veronika Megler, David Banis, Heejun Chang, Spatial analysis of graffiti in San Francisco, Applied Geography, Volume 54, 2014, p 63-73, ISSN 0143-6228.
