= ZX Interface 2 =

Peripheral for the ZX Spectrum

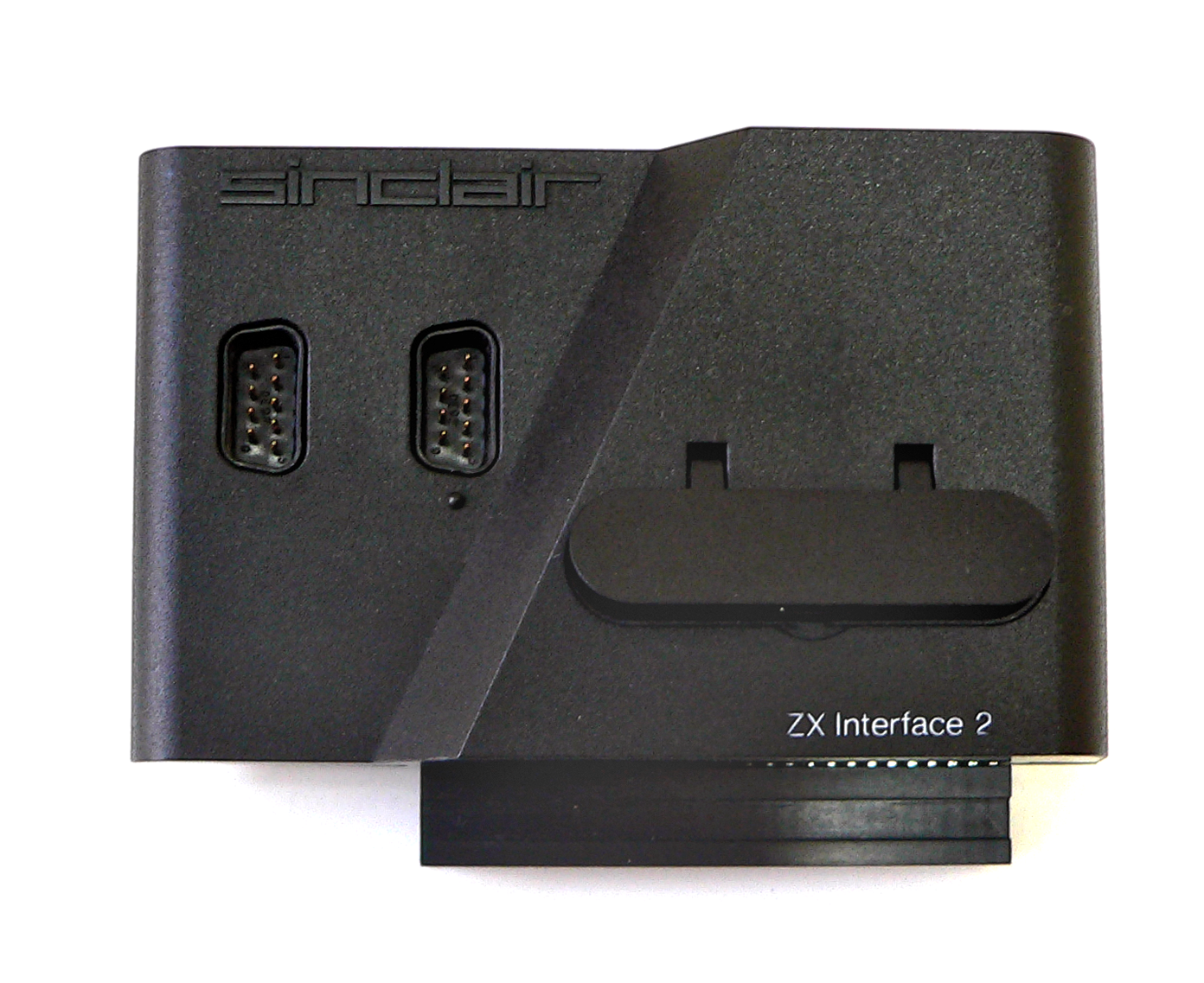
ZX Interface 2

The ZX Interface 2 is a peripheral from Sinclair Research for its ZX Spectrum home computer released in September 1983. It has two joystick ports and a ROM cartridge slot, which offers instant loading times. The joystick ports are not compatible with the popular Kempston interface, and thus do not work with most Spectrum games released prior to the launch of the ZX Interface 2. In addition, the pass-through expansion bus provided was stripped, only allowing a ZX Printer to be attached.

== Released titles ==
Availability of cartridge software is very limited. The cost was almost twice as much as the same game on a cassette tape. The majority of Spectrums sold were 48 KiB RAM models so software publishers were producing games much larger than the 16 KiB cartridge capacity.

Only ten games were commercially released:

1. Jetpac
2. PSSST
3. Cookie
4. Tranz Am
5. Chess
6. Backgammon
7. Hungry Horace
8. Horace and the Spiders
9. Planetoids
10. Space Raiders

Paul Farrow has demonstrated that it is possible to produce custom ROM cartridges, including the ability to exceed the 16 KiB design limitation of the ROM cartridges.

== Joystick ports ==
The interface two comes with two joystick ports that are mapped to keyboard keys. Each joystick direction switch and the fire switch replicate a keypress on the Spectrum keyboard. This differs from the then-popular Kempston Interface, whose joystick switches are separate to the keyboard and read using a Z80 IN 31 instruction.

Player 1 is mapped to 6–0 and player 2 is mapped to 1–5. The joystick directions mapping does not match the cursor keys which are at shifted 5–8, but it allows two joysticks where the full state of each can be read with a single Z80 IN instruction which also corresponds to the Sinclair BASIC IN function. Joystick interfaces that maps to the cursor keys are available, but like the popular Kempston interface they are limited to supporting a single joystick. It is the twin joystick feature of the ZX Interface 2 that turned out to be its major selling point.

== See also ==
- ZX Interface 1 — a peripheral with ports for ZX Microdrives, RS-232 serial units, and ZX Net cables (for connection to a ZX Net local area network)
