= Dash Galaxy in the Alien Asylum =

1990 video game

- Cover art
- Developer: Beam Software
- Publisher: Data East
- Artist: Tony G. Pentland
- Platform: NES
- Release: NA: February 1990
- Genre: Platform
- Mode: Single-player

Dash Galaxy in the Alien Asylum is a platform game for the Nintendo Entertainment System, developed by Beam Software and published by Data East, released in 1990 exclusively in North America.

== Gameplay ==
The player takes the role of Dash Galaxy, a space scout who has been captured by a hostile civilization thousands of light years from earth. The game, through a shifting perspective, contains action gameplay elements.

When the game starts, the player has four lives.

Gameplay involves navigating through a series of floors with several rooms each. Keys must be collected to progress to higher floors, and eventually, an escape ship. Dash's only weapons are a limited supply of bombs and remote detonators. Good timing is crucial to complete the game, requiring navigation of trampoline jumps and roaming enemies. Some of these jumps require Dash to run. The player also has a limited oxygen supply.

Dash can become invincible each stage by collecting ten stars.

While the rooms are side-scrolling action puzzles, the floors have an overhead view, and include difficult block-moving puzzles that can fatally trap a player.

There are also hidden and bonus rooms throughout the game.

== Reception ==
Helium.com wrote that Dash Galaxy "had potential, but falls under its own weight in the end" while giving the game a score of 41%.
