= Blades of Vengeance =

1993 video game

- North American box art
- Developer: Beam Software
- Publisher: Electronic Arts
- Producers: Chris Wilson; Adam Lancman
- Designers: Justin Halliday; Wayne Simmons
- Composers: Marshall Parker; Ian Eccles Smith
- Platform: Mega Drive/Genesis
- Release: NA/EU: December 1993
- Genre: Platform
- Modes: Single-player, multiplayer

Blades of Vengeance is a 1993 platform game developed by Beam Software and published by Electronic Arts for the Mega Drive/Genesis. One or two players can select one of three fantasy warriors to fight through a large range of platform levels in order to defeat the forces of darkness.

== Gameplay ==
At the beginning of the game, the player (or players) choose from one of three characters. From there, the player/s are thrown into the levels one at a time with a warning about the boss at the end of each one.

The player/s can collect items such as silver coins, potions and magic they could access in their inventory through the pause screen. While still in the pause screen, the players are able to get a better view of their surroundings by holding the C button and moving the screen around the player character with the directional pad. All of the levels are large enough to explore and many of them have secret areas that would award the player with additional pick-up items, such as potions of healing, invisibility, force fields, poison gas immunity, scrolls that increase player strength, keys, armor for additional attacks and strength per player, the Midas Ring which turns all enemies into bags of money and the Blast Wand which destroys all on-screen enemies.

The levels are divided into three portions with the third being the boss level, similar to Sonic the Hedgehog. After every boss battle, the players are taken to a shop where they can spend their silver coins on additional items for their inventory for the next levels. The players start with a certain number of lives, and continues are only available after scoring many points or defeating many enemies; extra lives can be purchased in the shop at the end of each world once they pass the second one. Once the lives and any obtained continues are gone, it's game over.

== Plot ==
The evil Mannax the Dark Lady has conquered the Kingdom. To "restore order and goodness to the land", three adventurers serving the good wizard The Master's embark to seek out and kill her. Once Mannax, who takes the form of a dragon for the final battle, is slain, The Master uses his returned full powers to destroy all forces of darkness through the land.

== Characters ==
- The Huntress: A voluptuous swords-woman with fastest movement, and even range and attacks.
- The Warrior: A muscular man with an axe and the best attack, but limited range and movement.
- The Sorcerer: A haggard old man armed with a staff that had the best ranged attacks, but was the weakest of the three in strength.

== Reception ==
Betty Hallock of VideoGames awarded Blades of Vengeance the overall review score of 8/10 (the other editors gave it two scores of 7/10 and two of 8/10), especially praising it for "practically superb" graphics and "excellent" control system. Other scores included 86% from Electronic Games and a lower 64% from HobbyConsolas.
