= Looney Tunes: Space Race =

2000 video game

- European Dreamcast cover art
- Developer: Infogrames Melbourne House
- Publisher: Infogrames
- Platforms: Dreamcast, PlayStation 2
- Release: Dreamcast: EU: November 3, 2000; NA: November 28, 2000; PlayStation 2: EU: February 8, 2002; NA: May 28, 2002
- Genre: Kart racing
- Modes: Single-player, Multiplayer

Looney Tunes: Space Race is a 2000 kart-racing video game published by Infogrames for the Dreamcast and developed through Infogrames' own Melbourne House studio. A version of Nintendo 64 was developed, but it was never released. It was ported to PlayStation 2 in 2002 (under the name "Space Race") with a new tournament mode and different soundtrack.

== Gameplay ==
Looney Tunes: Space Race is a kart racing game where a player can play as and race against characters in the Looney Tunes series. There are eight selectable characters, from Bugs Bunny to Wile E. Coyote, with 12 race tracks being in the game. Each track has Acme boxes with gags in them that act as power-ups that may be used as weapons against other racers. Gags include things such as anvils, pianos, and black holes. Along the tracks are green canisters, after collecting five of them, a player will be able to use a turbo boost.

Modes featured are single or multiplayer (up to four players) races, Challenge and Acme Events. The PlayStation 2 version got an exclusive Tournament mode.

== Development ==
Looney Tunes: Space Race was first announced in March 1998, the game was being developed by New Wave USA.The game was shown at E3 1999 along with Infogrames other Looney Tunes game for the Nintendo 64, Taz Express. In August 1999, they moved the project to the Dreamcast and development moved from New Wave USA to Infogrames Melbourne House. It was then shown at E3 2000, where it was 70% complete.

== Reception ==
Reception

Aggregate scores
| Aggregator | Score | |
| Aggregator | Dreamcast | PS2 |
|---|---|---|
| GameRankings | 77% | 62% |
| Metacritic | 83/100 | 62/100 |

Review scores
| Publication | Score | |
| Publication | Dreamcast | PS2 |
|---|---|---|
| AllGame | 3.5/5 | 2.5/5 |
| CNET Gamecenter | 8/10 | N/A |
| Electronic Gaming Monthly | 8/10 | 5/10 |
| EP Daily | 8.5/10 | 6.5/10 |
| Game Informer | 7/10 | 7/10 |
| GameFan | (F.M.) 85% 83% (Note: In GameFan's viewpoint of the Dreamcast version, three critics gave it each a score of 81, 87, and 82.) | N/A |
| GameRevolution | B− | C |
| GameSpot | 7/10 | 5.9/10 |
| GameSpy | 8/10 | N/A |
| GameZone | 7/10 | 7.5/10 |
| IGN | 9/10 | 6.9/10 |
| Next Generation | 3/5 | N/A |
| Official U.S. PlayStation Magazine | N/A | 2.5/5 |

The Dreamcast version received "favorable" reviews, while the PlayStation 2 version received "mixed" reviews, according to the review aggregation website Metacritic. Evan Shamoon of NextGen said of the former console version, "Despite one frustrating design decision, this is a beautifully presented and eminently likable game—and easily the best kart racer on Dreamcast."
