= DethKarz =

1998 video game

- Front cover of the American release
- Developer: Beam Software
- Publishers: AU: Melbourne House; NA: GT Interactive; PAL: Infogrames
- Producer: Andrew Carter
- Artist: Holger Liebnitz
- Composer: Gavin Parker
- Platform: Microsoft Windows
- Release: NA: 10 November 1998; PAL: 1998
- Genres: Racing, car combat
- Modes: Single-player, multiplayer

DethKarz is a futuristic 3D racing game by game publisher Melbourne House. It was released for Microsoft Windows on 10 November 1998. A Nintendo 64 port was planned but never released. It was released digitally on 20 December 2019 by Piko Interactive on GOG.com.

== Development ==
The game was showcased at E3 1997.

== Reception ==
Reception

Aggregate score
Aggregator	Score
GameRankings	75%

Review scores
Publication	Score
AllGame	4/5
CNET Gamecenter	8/10
Computer Games Strategy Plus	3/5
Computer Gaming World	4/5
Game Informer	8/10
GameRevolution	B+
GameSpot	5.7/10
IGN	6.8/10
Jeuxvideo.com	18/20
Next Generation	4/5
PC Accelerator	8/10
PC Gamer (US)	82%

The game received favourable reviews according to the review aggregation website GameRankings. GameSpot said, "Dethkarz follows the futuristic racing formula exactly, without bringing any real personality of its own." IGN said, "Dethkarz is just like all the other arcade racers that have been released recently. It's a decent racing game, but it's not as good as Need for Speed 3, Test Drive 5, or Ultimate Race Pro." Next Generation said, "as breathtaking as the game may be, and as well as it performs as a traditional racing game, there is absolutely nothing here that hasn't been done before. Of course, we don't expect every game to be a genre-shattering experience, but it never hurts to have an innovative touch or two thrown in for good measure."
