= Alien Earth =

1998 video game

- Box art
- Developer: Beam Software
- Publishers: NA: Playmates Interactive; GER: Funsoft GmbH
- Platform: IBM PC compatible
- Release: ^{NA} July 21, 1998
- Genre: Action role-playing
- Mode: Single-player

Alien Earth is an isometric pseudo-3D action-adventure game with role-playing elements. It was released for Windows. It was developed by Krome Studios Melbourne (known as Beam Software at the time), and released in 1998.

== Plot ==
What remains of Earth and most of its inhabitants after a nuclear holocaust is dominated and enslaved by the insect-like humanoid Raksha, invaders from another planet. Many years later, only the Resistance remains free, in the sewers of a ruined city. The player takes control of Finn, a villager in a jungle that the Raksha use to hunt their slaves as prey. A Raksha hunting lord marks Finn as a troublemaker, and he must outwit the Raksha, and seek aid wherever he can find it, to survive. His nemesis vanquished, Finn searches for answers about the fate of his civilization in a wartorn city, despite the Scavengers hunting through the ruins for scraps of remaining technology and intruders.

== Gameplay ==
Resource management is a key part of the game; items are collected, as in most games, but also combined; the latter is crucial to completing the game. Combining a wooden pole with a metallic blade forms a Spear, for example, or an empty bottle, petrol and a rag cloth to form a molotov cocktail. Separate NPCs make scavenged Raksha weapons usable and sellable, and level up Finn's psionic abilities. Finn's fighting abilities use a skill levelling system; the more Finn uses a weapon, the better he gets at using it.

== Development ==
The game was showcased at E3 1997.

== Reception ==
Next Generation reviewed the PC version of the game, rating it three stars out of five, and stated that "Well-designed and (mostly) well-implemented, it might not be flashy, but the game possesses a depth and quality that marks it as one of the brighter spots in the lineup this month." PC Action gave the game a rating of 53% and said the game had a good idea but implemented it half-heartedly. PC Zone gave a rating of 60% and said "the storyline is mildly enthralling, but nothing makes you sit up and take notice."
