= GP 500 =

1999 video game

- Developer(s): Melbourne House
- Publisher(s): Hasbro Interactive (Note: Released under the MicroProse label)
- Platform(s): Microsoft Windows
- Release: Microsoft Windows: NA: October 13, 1999
- Genre(s): Racing
- Mode(s): Single-player, multiplayer

GP 500 is a motorcycle racing simulation for the PC developed by Melbourne House and released in 1999 by Hasbro Interactive under the MicroProse label. The full length title of this game is "GP 500: The Official FIM Road Racing World Championship Grand Prix Race Simulator".
