= Horace (video game series) =

- Horace (as depicted on the Hungry Horace cover)
- Genres: Maze; Action; Platform
- Developer: Beam Software
- Publishers: Sinclair Research; Melbourne House
- Creator: William Tang
- Platforms: ZX Spectrum; Commodore 64; Dragon 32/64; Timex Sinclair 2068

Horace is a video game series created in the 1980s by William Tang and published by Beam Software. The series consists of Hungry Horace, Horace Goes Skiing and Horace and the Spiders.

Hungry Horace and Horace and the Spiders were two of the few ZX Spectrum games also available in ROM format for use with the Interface 2.

== Hungry Horace ==
The original Horace game, Hungry Horace was written as a simple Pac-Man clone, and published in 1982. In it, Horace must gather food from around a park and move onto the next section while avoiding park guards. It is possible for him to collect a bell to panic the guards and render them vulnerable, like the power pills in Pac-Man. This title was available on the ZX Spectrum, Commodore 64 and Dragon 32. The ZX Spectrum original was marketed and distributed by Sinclair themselves, the Commodore 64 and Dragon 32 versions by Melbourne House.

== Horace Goes Skiing ==
In 1983 Tang produced Horace Goes Skiing, in which Horace must cross a dangerous road teeming with traffic, à la Frogger, to rent a pair of skis, then get back over the road and successfully navigate a ski course.

Like Hungry Horace, this title was available on the ZX Spectrum, Commodore 64, and Dragon 32. As before, Sinclair distributed the Spectrum version, Melbourne House the Commodore 64 and Dragon 32 versions. In 2017, the game placed on Eurogamer's "10 games that defined the ZX Spectrum" list. Horace Goes Skiing was released on Steam by Pixel Games UK in October 2020.

== Horace and the Spiders ==
In-game screen of Horace in the Spiders' Lair.

In 1983, Tang produced the third title in the series, Horace and the Spiders which was primarily a platform game. The first level sees Horace climbing a hill while jumping over spiders. The second level involves crossing a bridge by swinging on spider threads. The third level is the final confrontation with the spiders – he must create holes in the web, luring the spiders into the holes to fix them and subsequently stamping on them.

Unlike the earlier two titles, this game was only released for the ZX Spectrum. The first stage of this game shared similarities with both Pitfall and the ColecoVision game Smurf: Rescue in Gargamel's Castle, whilst the third platform stage is essentially a Space Panic clone.

== Horace to the Rescue ==
This title was announced in 1985 but the game never appeared, due to the author Tang suffering a collapsed lung and being unable to continue.

== Psion Series 3 game ==
Horace returned in 1995 on Psion's Games Deluxe, a collection of six games sold on a ROM SSD for the Series 3a. In this version Horace collects stars across 64 levels while avoiding monsters. Palmtop magazine praised its polish and recommended the collection.
