= Dredd (soundtrack) =

Film score by Paul Leonard-Morgan
- Released: 10 September 2012 (UK); 25 September 2012 (US)
- Recorded: 2012
- Genres: Industrial; experimental; electronic; post-modern
- Length: 51:26
- Label: Metropolis Movie Music
- Producer: Paul Leonard-Morgan

Paul Leonard-Morgan chronology
Limitless (2011)	Dredd (2012)	The Numbers Station (2012)

Dredd (Original Film Soundtrack) is the soundtrack to the 2012 film of the same name directed by Pete Travis from a screenplay written by Alex Garland. The album consisted industrial music composed by Paul Leonard-Morgan, which consisted both electronic and post-modern music resulting in a futuristic sound that set over 100 years, and experimented sounds that created by slowing down newly written music over one-thousandth of a percent matching the slow motion years. Metropolis Movie Music released the soundtrack in the United Kingdom on 10 September 2012 and in the United States on 25 September 2012.

== Development ==
Leonard-Morgan was familiar with the Dredd character, despite not being a fan of comics, as he was an "iconic character who sees things in black-and-white" and not a traditional superhero in Hollywood, but a "dangerous and edgy" mix of RoboCop (1987) and Dirty Harry (1971). From a music point of view, he wanted to create a futuristic sound set in over 100 years, hence he ruled out on the use of traditional orchestra and also tried on experimenting with band music, but as it felt "too safe and overtly-produced" he went on an electronic vibe using synth music from the 1980s and present day sound modules, where were screwed up, and put down through distorted and pedalled sound effects to create a "timeless score which couldn't be placed in any particular era. So it's ended up being a cross between a modern dance track and evocative soundscapes".

For scenes conveying the effect of the Slo-Mo narcotic, he composed and recorded new tracks with real instruments and slowed them down by 0.17% using timestretch softwares to match the visuals, so that one second of the score written could last over 10 minutes. He then used the realtime score over the top it, which gives a weird, but "truly beautiful and ethereal" sound taking the viewers to a completely different world. An unofficially altered version of Justin Bieber's song "U Smile" served as an inspiration for the theme, which Garland recalled that Portishead instrumentalist Geoff Barrow sent him the link to that song which slowed down 800 times which became "this stunning trippy choral music". Morgan then recreated the effect based on the modified track, which was used in the finished film. The film used Bieber's music as a temporary placeholder during editing before the score was finalised.

== Track listing ==
No.	Title	Length
1.	"She's A Pass"	3:16
2.	"Mega City One"	3:13
3.	"The Plan"	2:37
4.	"The Rise Of Ma-Ma"	1:55
5.	"Anderson's Theme"	2:36
6.	"Lockdown"	2:46
7.	"Cornered"	2:17
8.	"Kay Escapes"	3:17
9.	"Mini-Guns"	2:02
10.	"Undefined Space"	1:17
11.	"Bad Judges"	2:03
12.	"Judgment Time"	1:52
13.	"Hiding Out"	2:23
14.	"Order In The Chaos"	1:16
15.	"Slo-Mo"	1:27
16.	"Taking Over Peach Trees"	1:27
17.	"It's All A Deep End"	2:20
18.	"Judge, Jury And Executioner"	2:18
19.	"Any Last Requests?"	3:25
20.	"You Look Ready"	1:38
21.	"Ma-Ma's Requiem"	3:37
22.	"Apocalyptic Wasteland"	2:24
Total length:		51:26

== Reception ==
Ilker Yücel of ReGen Magazine wrote "While it isn't as engaging in separation from its visual manifestation as Tron: Legacy was, Morgan's score still is a rather special compromise between tension building clichés of film music and modern, edgy electronica. It's a brisk ride that manages to perfectly encapsulate the mood, the grit, and the escalating danger and even for those who haven't yet seen the movie will be a tasty, stimulating treat." Geoff Berkshire of Variety called it as a "throbbing bass-driven score". Ben Child of The Guardian wrote Leonard-Morgan's musical interludes are "wonderfully washed out".

== Vinyl edition ==
On October 17, 2022, Atlantic Screen Music, in collaboration with Mondo announced the release of the vinyl edition of the film's soundtrack on the film's 10th anniversary and released on November 11. The soundtrack packaged in double-disc 180-gram vinyl, consists of an artwork by Judge Luke Preece, with initial copies pressed in slo-mo and Dredd wax present in a gold foil slipcase. The album consisted of the film's original score along with additional tracks, mostly remixes and alternate versions covered in piano performed by Mogwai, John Tejada and P. T. Adamczyk, along with Leonard-Morgan.

No.	Title	Length
23.	"Mama's Requiem" (Paul Leonard-Morgan Remix)	6:55
24.	"She's a Pass" (Mogwai Remix)	4:42
25.	"Anderson's Theme" (John Tejada Remix)	5:47
26.	"She's a Pass" (P.T. Adamczyk Remix)	4:47
27.	"Mama's Requiem" (Piano Version)	4:48
28.	"Order in the Chaos" (Piano Version)	4:38
29.	"She's a Pass" (Piano Version)	4:50
Total length:		88:00

== Credits ==
- Bass – Ross Hamilton, Aaron Steinberg
- Composer, producer – Paul Leonard-Morgan
- Score co-ordinator – Caroline Gorman
- Drums – Ben Martin, Tony Doogan (recording)
- Music editor – Yann McCullough
- Engineer – Tom Bailey
- Guitar – Aaron Steinberg
- Mastering – Mazen Murad
- Mixing – Rupert Coulson
- Musical assistance – Dianne Stevenson
- Product manager – Luke Armitage
