= Sherlock (video game) =

1984 video game

- Cover of the game
- Developer: Beam Software
- Publisher: Melbourne House
- Platforms: Commodore 64, ZX Spectrum
- Release: 1984
- Mode: Single player

Sherlock is a 1984 text adventure developed under the lead of Philip Mitchell by Beam Software. It was published by Melbourne House. Five programmers worked for 18 months on the title and a Sherlock Holmes expert was employed full-time for a year to advise the team on accuracy.

Technically, the adventure builds upon the 1982 title The Hobbit. Autonomous NPCs and realtime gameplay, two sophisticated features of The Hobbit, are present in Sherlock - as is Inglish, the parser responsible for analyzing the player's commands. The game simulated 'real time'; trains ran to a time table and key plot events began at exactly specified moments. There was also an attempt to move beyond 'instructional' communication with characters (in which non-player characters are told or asked to complete actions the player does not wish to or is unable to complete) to 'dialogic' communication in which characters could be questioned, challenged and persuaded with evidence. The latter was an early attempt to simulate changing states of consciousness within an interactive narrative.

== Plot ==
A double murder has been committed in the town of Leatherhead and Dr. Watson has encouraged the player, who plays Holmes, to investigate. Inspector Lestrade is also investigating.
