= Hampstead (video game) =

1984 video game

- Developers: Trevor Lever; Peter Jones
- Publisher: Melbourne House
- Platforms: Commodore 64, ZX Spectrum, BBC Micro, Acorn Electron, iOS
- Release: 1984
- Genre: Interactive fiction
- Mode: Single-player

Hampstead is a satirical text adventure released for the ZX Spectrum and Commodore 64. The player begins the game in a filthy council flat, has to get a high-paying job in the city, woo a beautiful model and buy a house on Hampstead Heath. It was written by Trevor Lever and Peter Jones. It sold about 70,000 copies.

== Legacy ==
In 2014 a version was released for the iPad.
