= Zebulon Dread =

South African personality and writer

- Born: Elliot Josephs
- Language: Afrikaans, English
- Genre: Satire
- Subjects: South African politics and culture
- Notable works: Hei Voetsek!

Elliot Josephs, better known as Zebulon Dread, is a South African cultural icon (or cultural terrorist, as he describes himself) and writer. He is a controversial celebrity, known for his political views.

Dread is most well known for his politically incorrect satirical self-publication, Hei Voetsek. Two later magazines, Poes! and Piel! parodied the sexism of consumer magazines. In addition, Dread published a number of satirical books. In 2002, disillusioned with the lack of transformation in South Africa, Josephs determined to retire his alter-ego, committing "ritual suicide." He explained, "I am going to give up the ghost of my alter-ego, Zebulon Dread, and depart for India in order to find the happiness that the liberation struggle failed to deliver".

== Hei Voetsek! ==
Hei Voetsek! was published in Cape Town, South Africa between 1997 and 2002. In the first issue of the magazine, the title of which translates loosely "Hey, get lost!", Josephs explained, "This magazine is just to say we're out there and we don't buy your shit. It's freedom of expression and the means by which a long-suffering artist becomes an entrepreneur, taking destiny into his own hands and out of the devious honkies who so love control." Written, designed, drawn, Photoshopped and photocopied by Josephs himself, Hei Voetsek! dissected South African politics, culture, society and sex.

The magazine, which railed against everyone from corrupt politicians and conservative Afrikaaners to "darkies with a chip on their shoulders", was written in Cape Flats taal, a street-smart mixture of English, Afrikaans and slang.

Refused by more established publishers because of the nature of the work, Josephs used small, independent black printing firms. He sold the magazine himself on the streets, at book fairs and at art festivals countrywide.

== Bibliography ==
- Memoirs of a Closet Guerrilla

== Sources ==
This article duplicates material from HEI VOETSEK! at chimurengalibrary.co.za, released under GFDL
