= Psssssst =

No-water substitute for traditional shampoo

Psssssst Instant Spray Shampoo is a no-water substitute for traditional shampoo, popular in the 1970s; its popularity was widespread enough that it is considered a pop culture icon.

Psssssst was produced by Woodridge Labs; its history may date to the 1950s.

The company recently began making Psssssst again. Current cans of the product have four letters "S" in the brand name; previous versions had five or six.

The back label of a recently purchased can reads: "Between Shampoos- On Camping Trips- After Sports- When Ill- Any time you can't use water. Psssssst is the convenient, quick fresher-upper for your hair."

== In popular culture ==
The Nanny season 1 episode "Maggie the Model" featured a character who modeled for Psssssst during the 1960s.
