= Beam Software =

Australian video game studio

Krome Studios Melbourne
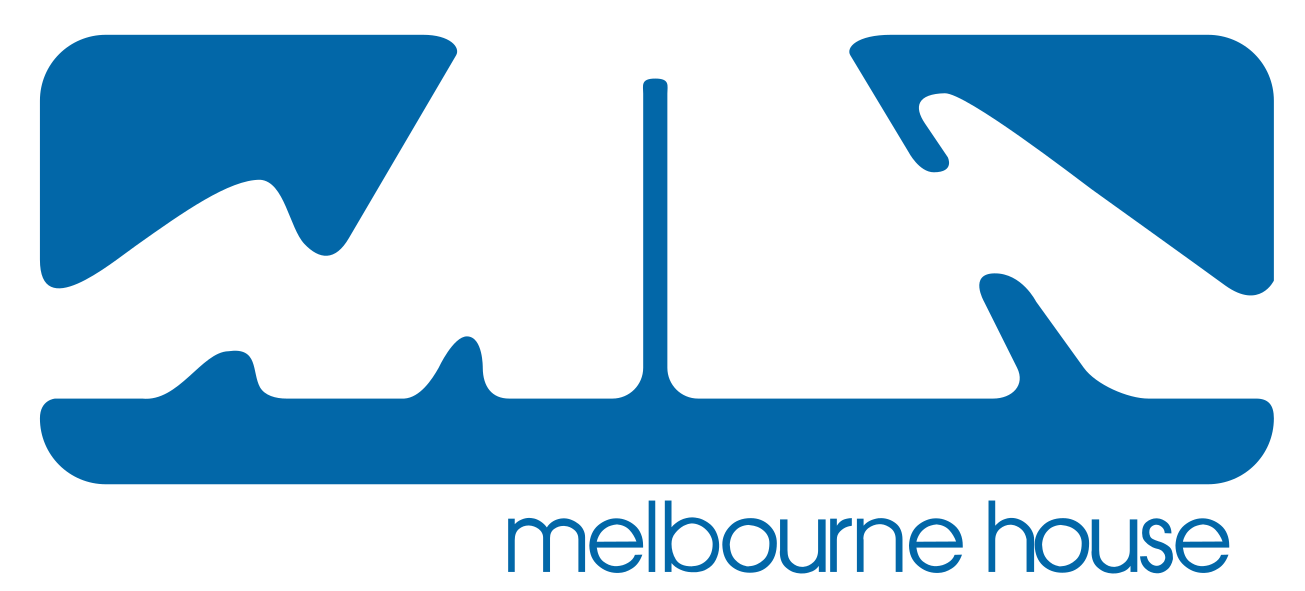
- Melbourne House's final logo (2004/2006)
- Formerly: Beam Software (1980–1993); Laser Beam Entertainment (1993–1997); Beam Software; Melbourne House (1997–1999); Infogrames Melbourne House Pty Ltd. (1999–2003); Atari Melbourne House Pty Ltd. (2003–2006)
- Industry: Video games
- Founded: 1980 in Melbourne, Australia
- Founder: Alfred Milgrom; Naomi Besen
- Defunct: 15 October 2010; 16 years ago
- Headquarters: Melbourne, Australia
- Products: The Hobbit; The Way of the Exploding Fist; Shadowrun; Le Mans 24 Hours
- Number of employees: 40
- Parent: Infogrames (1999–2006); Krome Studios (2006–2010)
- Website: melbournehouse.com (archived)

Beam Software, finally known as Krome Studios Melbourne, was an Australian video game development studio founded in 1980 by Alfred Milgrom and Naomi Besen and based in Melbourne, Australia. Initially formed to produce books and software to be published by Melbourne House, a company they had established in London in 1977, the studio operated independently from 1987 until 1999, when it was acquired by Infogrames, who changed the name to Infogrames Melbourne House Pty Ltd.. In 2006 the studio was sold to Krome Studios.

The name Beam was a contraction of the names of the founders: Naomi Besen and Alfred Milgrom.

== History ==
=== Home computer era ===
In the early years, two of Beam's programs were milestones in their respective genres. The Hobbit, a 1982 text adventure by Philip Mitchell and Veronika Megler, sold more than 500,000 copies. It employed an advanced parser by Stuart Richie and had real-time elements. Even if the player didn't enter commands, the story would move on. In 1985 Greg Barnett's two-player martial arts game The Way of the Exploding Fist helped define the genre of one-on-one fighting games on the home computer. The game won Best Overall Game at the Golden Joystick Awards.

In 1987 Beam's UK publishing arm, Melbourne House, was sold to Mastertronic for £850,000. Beam chairman Alfred Milgrom recounted, "...around 1987 a lot of our U.K. people went on to other companies and at around the same time the industry was moving from 8-bit to 16-bit. It was pretty chaotic. We didn't have the management depth at that time to run both the publishing and development sides of things, so we ended up selling off the whole Melbourne House publishing side to Mastertronic." Subsequent games were released through varying publishers. The 1988 fighting games Samurai Warrior and Fist +, the third instalment in the Exploding Fist series, were published through Telecomsoft's Firebird label. 1988 also saw the release of space-shoot'em-up Bedlam, published by GO!, one of U.S. Gold's labels, and The Muncher, published by Gremlin Graphics.

=== Shift to consoles and PCs ===
In 1987 Nintendo granted a developer's licence for the NES and Beam developed games on that platform for US and Japanese publishers. Targeted at an Australian audience, releases such as Aussie Rules Footy and International Cricket for the NES proved successful. In 1991, the company launched its publishing division after the sale of Melbourne House, called Laser Beam Entertainment, while started developing development kits for Sega Genesis. In 1992 it released the original title Nightshade, a dark superhero comedy game. The game was meant to be the first part in a series, but no sequels were ever made; however, it served as the basis for Shadowrun. Released in 1993, Shadowrun also used an innovative dialogue system using the acquisition of keywords which could be used in subsequent conversations to initiate new branches in the dialogue tree. Also in 1993 it released Baby T-Rex, a Game Boy platform game that the developer actively sought to adapt the game to a number of different licensed properties in different countries around the world including the animated film We're Back! in North America and the puppet character Agro in its home country of Australia.

In 1997, Beam relaunched the Melbourne House brand, and discontinuing the Laser Beam name, under which it published the PC titles Krush Kill 'n' Destroy (KKND), and the sequels KKND Xtreme and KKND2: Krossfire. They released KKND2 in South Korea well before they released it in the American and European markets, and pirated versions of the game were available on the internet before it was available in stores in the U.S. They were the developers of the 32-bit versions of Norse By Norse West: The Return of the Lost Vikings for the Sega Saturn, PlayStation and PC in 1996. They also helped produce Super NES games such as WCW SuperBrawl Wrestling, Super Smash TV and an updated version of International Cricket titled Super International Cricket. They ported the Sega Saturn game Bug! to Windows 3.x in August 1996.

1998 saw a return to RPGs with Alien Earth, again with a dialogue tree format. Also in 1998, the studio developed racing games DethKarz and GP 500.

In 1999 Beam Software was acquired by Infogrames and renamed to Infogrames Melbourne House Pty Ltd. While fully owned by the company itself, the studio was represented in the United States by the then publicly traded division Infogrames, Inc.

=== 2000s ===
They continued to cement a reputation as a racing game developer with Le Mans 24 Hours and Looney Tunes: Space Race (both Dreamcast and PlayStation 2), followed by Grand Prix Challenge (PlayStation 2), before going into third-person shooters with Men in Black II: Alien Escape (PlayStation 2, GameCube).

In 2004 the studio released Transformers for the PlayStation 2 games console based on the then current Transformers Armada franchise by Hasbro. The game reached the top of the UK PlayStation 2 games charts, making it Melbourne House's most successful recent title.

The studio then completed work on PlayStation 2 and PlayStation Portable ports of Eden's next-generation Xbox 360 title Test Drive: Unlimited.

In December 2005, Atari decided to shift away from internal development, seeking to sell its studios, including Melbourne House. In November 2006, Krome Studios acquired Melbourne House from Atari and was renamed to Krome Studios Melbourne. It was closed on 15 October 2010, along with the main Brisbane office. Next to the game development, Beam Software also had the division Smarty Pants Publishing Pty Ltd., that created software titles for kids, as well as the proprietary video compression technology VideoBeam, and Famous Faces, a facial motion capture hardware and software solution.

== Games ==
=== As Beam Software ===
- 1982: Strike Force (TRS-80), Hungry Horace, Horace Goes Skiing, Horace and the Spiders, The Hobbit, Penetrator (Commodore 64, Microbee, Timex Sinclair 2068, TRS-80, ZX Spectrum)
- 1983: H.U.R.G: High-Level User-Friendly Real-Time Games Designer (ZX Spectrum)
- 1984: Castle of Terror (Commodore 64, ZX Spectrum), Hampstead (Commodore 64, ZX Spectrum), Mugsy (ZX Spectrum), Sherlock (Commodore 64, ZX Spectrum), Zim Sala Bim (Commodore 64)
- 1985: Gyroscope, Lord of the Rings: Game One, Terrormolinos, The Way of the Exploding Fist (Acorn Electron, Amstrad CPC, BBC Micro, Commodore 16, Commodore 64, ZX Spectrum), Starion (Amstrad CPC, Commodore 64, ZX Spectrum).
- 1986: Asterix and the Magic Cauldron (Amstrad CPC, Commodore 64, ZX Spectrum), Fist: The Legend Continues Commodore 64, ZX Spectrum), Judge Dredd (Commodore 64, ZX Spectrum), Knuckle Busters (Commodore 64, ZX Spectrum), Mugsy's Revenge, Rock'n Wrestle
- 1987: Inspector Gadget and the Circus of Fear (Amstrad CPC, BBC Micro, Commodore 64, ZX Spectrum), Shadows of Mordor (Amstrad CPC, Apple II, Commodore 64, Macintosh, MS-DOS, ZX Spectrum), Street Hassle (Commodore 64, MS-DOS, ZX Spectrum)
- 1988: Samurai Warrior: The Battles of Usagi Yojimbo (Amstrad CPC, Commodore 64, ZX Spectrum), The Muncher (Commodore 64, ZX Spectrum), Arcade Wizzard (Commodore 64 (cancelled))
- 1989: 720° (NES), Back to the Future (NES), Bad Street Brawler (NES), Aussie Games (Commodore 64, ZX Spectrum), Sgt. Slaughter’s Mat Wars (Commodore 64)
- 1990: Back to the Future Part II & III (NES), Dash Galaxy in the Alien Asylum (NES), Fisher-Price: Perfect Fit (NES), Boulder Dash (Game Boy), NBA All-Star Challenge (Game Boy), The Punisher (NES), Road Blasters (NES), Bigfoot (NES), Battle Chess (NES)
- 1991: Choplifter II (Game Boy), Hunt for Red October (Game Boy, NES), Smash TV (NES), Family Feud (NES), J. R. R. Tolkien's Riders of Rohan (MS-DOS), Aussie Rules Footy (NES), Power Punch II (NES), Star Wars (NES)
- 1992: International Cricket (NES), Nightshade (NES), T2: The Arcade Game (Game Boy), NBA All-Star Challenge 2 (Game Boy), Tom and Jerry (Game Boy), Super Smash TV (Super NES), George Foreman's KO Boxing (NES, Game Boy, Super NES, Genesis)
- 1993: Baby T-Rex (Game Boy), We're Back BC (Game Boy), Agro Soar (Game Boy), Blades of Vengeance (Genesis), NFL Quarterback Club (Game Boy), Shadowrun (Super NES), MechWarrior (Super NES), Super High Impact (Super NES), Tom and Jerry - Frantic Antics (Genesis)
- 1994: Choplifter III (Super NES), The Simpsons: Itchy & Scratchy in Miniature Golf Madness (Game Boy), Radical Rex (Genesis, Sega CD, Super NES), Super Smash TV (GG, SMS), Solitaire FunPak (Game Boy), Stargate (Game Boy), WCW: The Main Event (Game Boy)
- 1995: True Lies (Game Boy, Genesis, Super NES), Super International Cricket (Super NES), The Dame Was Loaded (Macintosh, MS-DOS)
- 1995: Bug! (PC port), Cricket 96 (MS-DOS), Jim Lee's WildC.A.T.S: Covert Action Teams (Super NES)
- 1996: 5 in One Fun Pak (GG)
- 1997: Caesars Palace (PlayStation), Cricket 97 (MS-DOS, Windows)
- 1997: Krush, Kill 'n' Destroy (MS-DOS, Windows)
- 1998: Dethkarz (Windows)
- 1998: NBA Action 98 (PC)
- 1998: KKnD 2: Krossfire (PC, PlayStation)
- 1999: GP 500 (PC)

=== As Infogrames Melbourne House/Atari Melbourne House ===
Year	Title	Platform(s)	Publisher(s)
2000	Le Mans 24 Hours	Dreamcast	Infogrames
2000	Looney Tunes: Space Race	Dreamcast	Infogrames
2001	Le Mans 24 Hours	PlayStation 2	Infogrames
2002	Space Race	PlayStation 2	Infogrames
2002	Le Mans 24 Hours	Windows	Infogrames
2002	Men in Black II: Alien Escape	PlayStation 2	Infogrames
2002	Grand Prix Challenge	PlayStation 2	Infogrames
2003	Men in Black II: Alien Escape (Note: Ported by Tantalus.)	GameCube	Infogrames
2003	Terminator 3: Rise of the Machines (Note: Support developer for Black Ops Entertainment, worked on sound design.)	PlayStation 2, Xbox	Atari
2004	Transformers	PlayStation 2	Atari
2007	Test Drive Unlimited (Note: Ported for Eden Games.)	PlayStation 2, PlayStation Portable	Atari

=== As Krome Studios Melbourne ===
Year	Title	Platform(s)	Publisher(s)	Note(s)
2007	Viva Piñata: Party Animals	Xbox 360	Microsoft Game Studios	Co-developed with Krome Studios
2008	Hellboy: The Science of Evil	Xbox 360, PlayStation 3	Konami	Co-developed with Krome Studios
2008	Star Wars: The Force Unleashed	Wii, PlayStation 2, PlayStation Portable	Lucasarts	Co-developed with Krome Studios
2008	Scene It? Box Office Smash	Xbox 360	Microsoft Game Studios	
2008	Star Wars: The Clone Wars - Lightsaber Duels	Wii	Lucasarts	Co-developed with Krome Studios
2009	Transformers: Revenge of the Fallen	Wii, PlayStation 2	Activision	Co-developed with Krome Studios
2009	Star Wars: The Clone Wars - Republic Heroes	Microsoft Windows, Xbox 360, PlayStation 3, Wii, PlayStation 2, PlayStation Portable	Lucasarts	Co-developed with Krome Studios
2010	Legend of the Guardians: The Owls of Ga'Hoole	Xbox 360, PlayStation 3, Wii	Warner Bros. Interactive Entertainment	Co-developed with Krome Studios
2010	Blade Kitten	Microsoft Windows, Xbox 360, PlayStation 3	Atari / Krome Studios	Co-developed with Krome Studios
2010	Blade Kitten: Episode 2	Microsoft Windows	Krome Studios	Co-developed with Krome Studios
