= Dred =

Dred may refer to:

== People ==
- Mike Dred (born 1967), pseudonym of British musical artist Michael C. Cullen
- Dred Foxx, hip hop artist and voice of video game character PaRappa
- Dred Scott (ca. 1795 – September 17, 1858), American slave who sued unsuccessfully for his freedom in 1856
- Dred Scott (rapper), American rapper, songwriter and music producer

== Other ==
- Department of Resources and Economic Development (DRED), a former government agency in the U.S. state of New Hampshire, superseded by the state's Department of Business and Economic Affairs (DBEA) and Department of Natural and Cultural Resources (DNCR)
- Dred: A Tale of the Great Dismal Swamp, the second novel from American author Harriet Beecher Stowe
- Dred Scott v. Sandford, an 1857 landmark decision of the United States Supreme Court

== See also ==
- Dread (disambiguation)
- Dredd (disambiguation)
