= Inspector Gadget and the Circus of Fear =

1987 video game

- Cover art (Commodore 64)
- Developer: Melbourne House
- Publisher: Erbe Software S.A.
- Platforms: Commodore 64, ZX Spectrum
- Release: 1987
- Genre: Platform
- Modes: Single-player, multiplayer

Inspector Gadget and the Circus of Fear is a video game based on the television series Inspector Gadget.

== Gameplay ==
The game has a 15 minute time limit.

== Development ==
The original version of this game was canceled by Mastertronic, and development transferred to new developers. Shortly after this transfer the original developers discovered the simple bug that had prevented the release of that version.

== Reception ==
Reception

Review scores
Publication	Score
ASM	23/50
Commodore User	5/10

The released version of the game was criticized by Commodore User and ASM. Commodore User called the game "very average", and the graphics "unremarkable", summarizing it as "a sad, sorry show".
