= The Hobbit (1982 video game) =

1982 interactive fiction video game based on novel by J. R. R. Tolkien

- ZX Spectrum cover art
- Developer: Beam Software
- Publisher: Melbourne House
- Designers: Veronika Megler; Philip Mitchell
- Platforms: Amstrad CPC; Apple II; BBC Micro; Commodore 64; Dragon 64; IBM PC; Mac; Oric; MSX; ZX Spectrum
- Release: UK: December 1982
- Genre: Adventure
- Mode: Single-player

The Hobbit is an illustrated text adventure video game developed by Beam Software and published by Melbourne House in 1982 that is based on the 1937 book The Hobbit by J. R. R. Tolkien.

== Description ==
The Hobbit recreates Tolkien's novel as an illustrated text adventure for a single player. The parser was very advanced for the time and used a subset of English called Inglish. At the time The Hobbit was released, most other adventure games used simple verb-noun parsers (allowing for simple phrases like "get lamp"), but Inglish allowed the player to type advanced sentences such as "ask Gandalf about the curious map then take sword and kill troll with it". The parser was complex and intuitive, introducing pronouns, adverbs ("viciously attack the goblin"), punctuation and prepositions to allow the player to interact with the game world in ways not previously possible.

== Gameplay ==
Many locations are illustrated by an image, based on originals designed by Kent Rees. On the tape version, to save space, each image was stored in a compressed format by storing outline information and then flood filling the enclosed areas on the screen. The slow CPU speed meant that it would take up to several seconds for each scene to draw. The disk-based versions of the game used pre-rendered, higher-quality images.

The game has an innovative text-based physics system, developed by Veronika Megler. Objects, including the characters in the game, have a calculated size, weight, and solidity. Objects can be placed inside other objects, attached together with rope and damaged or broken. If the main character is sitting in a barrel and this barrel is then picked up and thrown through a trapdoor, the player would go through.

Unlike other works of interactive fiction, the game is also in real time, insofar as a period of idleness causes the "WAIT" command to be automatically invoked and the possibility of events occurring as a result. This can be suppressed by entering the "PAUSE" command, which stops all events until a key is pressed.

The game has a cast of non-player characters (NPCs) entirely independent of the player and bound to precisely the same game rules. They have loyalties, strengths, and personalities that affect their behaviour and cannot always be predicted. The character of Gandalf, for example, would roam freely around the game world (some fifty locations), picking up objects, getting into fights and being captured.

The volatility of the characters, coupled with the rich physics and impossible-to-predict fighting system, enabled the game to be played in many different ways, though this would also lead to problems (such as an important character being killed early on). There are numerous possible solutions and with hindsight, the game might be regarded as one of the first examples of emergent gameplay. This also resulted, however, in many bugs; for example, during development Megler found that the animal NPCs killed each other before the player arrived. The game's documentation warned that "Due to the immense size and complexity of this game it is impossible to guarantee that it will ever be completely error-free". Melbourne House issued a version 1.1 with some fixes, but with another bug that resulted in the game being unwinnable, forcing it to release version 1.2, and the company never fixed all bugs.

== Publication history ==
In 1980, Beam Software acquired the licence for computer rights to The Hobbit. The game was developed at Beam by Philip Mitchell and Veronika Megler with Alfred Milgrom and Stuart Richie over a period of eighteen months. Graphics were designed by Russell Comte, Greg Holland and Paul Mitchell, and music for the Commodore 64 version was composed by Neil Brennan. The package was designed by Copenhaver Cumpston. The finished product was published by Melbourne House for the Sinclair ZX Spectrum in 1982. By arrangement with the book publishers, a copy of the book was included with each game sold.

Later versions were released for the Commodore 64, BBC Micro, Oric, and other home computers.

Beam followed up with 1985's Lord of the Rings: Game One, 1987's Shadows of Mordor: Game Two of Lord of the Rings, and 1989's The Crack of Doom. They also reused the Inglish parser in Sherlock.

In 1986, a parody of the game was released by CRL, The Boggit.

== Reception ==
The use of images on many of the locations as opposed to mostly text-only adventure games of the time, the flexibility of the Inglish parser, the innovative independence of the non-player characters, the popularity of Tolkien's work, all contributed to the game's phenomenal success. The Hobbit was a bestseller in the UK on the ZX Spectrum in 1983, and on both the C64 and BBC by the end of the year. selling over 100,000 copies in its first two years at a retail price of £14.95. The game sold over 500,000 units in Europe.

Benn Brown, writing for Info, commented that the graphics on the Commodore 64 were "pleasant but no show-stoppers", and that the game's parser and puzzles were "typical of most adventures today". Brown concluded by giving the game a rating of three-plus stars out of five, saying "Tolkien fans will most likely be pleased with this title".

In Issue 13 of Gateways (March 1989), Charles and Sydney Barouch called the packaging "quite complete and eye-appealing" but found the 7-year-old parser "fairly limited in the number of words it understands", which they found frustrating. They also pointed out that it was possible to skip major parts of the story that were necessary to complete the game, meaning "Sometimes you have to go back and redo entire areas that you may have missed." For this reason, they warned that "someone who hasn't read the book will have a very hard time understanding what is going on." They also noted that the game leaves out parts of the book, which they felt would "make the knowledgeable player even more dissatisfied." They concluded that their experience with the game had been a "disappointing excursion."

Seven years after publication of The Hobbit, Keith McCandless reviewed the Macintosh versions of The Hobbit, The Fellowship of the Ring and The Shadows of Mordor in Macworld. He called The Hobbit "particularly clumsy" because its parser was "handicapped by a 400-word input vocabulary" as opposed to the 800-words parsers of the two other games. McCandless praised The Hobbit's graphics, but stated that in the later titles the art adds little to the games' overall appeal. Furthermore, McCandless criticised the dated and rigid nature of the text-adventure format (although conceding that "the programming was undertaken almost a decade ago"), but acknowledged that the three games were "literate and faithful in spirit to original books". He recommended the "particularly intricate" The Fellowship of the Ring as an entry point to the series as opposed to The Hobbit.

== Awards ==
The Hobbit won the 1983 Golden Joystick Award for best strategy game.

== Legacy ==
To help players, a book called A Guide to Playing The Hobbit by David Elkan was published in 1984.

A phrase from the game which has entered popular culture is "Thorin sits down and starts singing about gold".

The game is mentioned in Nick Montfort's Twisty Little Passages, a book exploring the history and form of the interactive fiction genre.

In Discworld Noir, when the protagonist, Lewton, discovers that someone concealed themselves in a wine barrel, he wonders why that brings to mind the phrases "You wait – time passes" and "Thorin sits down and starts singing about gold".
