= Judge Dredd (1986 video game) =

- Developers: Doug Palmer, Neil Brennan
- Publisher: Melbourne House
- Platforms: Commodore 64, ZX Spectrum
- Release: EU: 1986
- Genres: Platform, shoot 'em up
- Mode: Single-player

Judge Dredd is a platform shoot 'em up video game based on the character of the same name. It was developed by Beam Software and published by Melbourne House. It was released in Europe in 1986, for Commodore 64 and ZX Spectrum.

== Gameplay ==
Judge Dredd is a platform shoot 'em up game set in the fictional Mega-City One. Playing as Judge Dredd, the player's goal is to apprehend or kill criminals known as "perps." The player begins with a map that highlights various crimes occurring throughout the city. After choosing a crime location, the player goes there to stop the perp. The player has three options for dealing with perps: "Halt", in which Judge Dredd orders the perp to stop; "Warn", in which he fires a warning shot; and "Kill", in which he chooses to shoot and kill the perp. The player's weapon is Judge Dredd's Lawgiver gun, which can shoot six different bullet types. A panel at the bottom of the screen indicates the type of crime, the perp's whereabouts, and weapon information such as the selected gun and the amount of ammunition. If more than eight crimes are occurring throughout the city, the player loses. Aside from perps, other enemies throughout the game include robot dogs. The ZX Spectrum version does not feature music.

== Development and release ==
Around 1984, a Judge Dredd video game was in development by Games Workshop. When the company stopped producing software, the Australia-based Melbourne House took over the project several months later. Melbourne House published the game, which was developed by Beam Software. It was released in Europe in 1986, for Commodore 64 (C64). By early 1987, it had also been released for the ZX Spectrum. It was the first Judge Dredd video game. Ricochet published a budget re-release of the C64 version in 1988.

== Reception ==
Reception

Review scores
Publication	Score
Crash	42% (ZX Spectrum)
Sinclair User	5/5 (ZX Spectrum)
Your Sinclair	8/10 (ZX Spectrum)
Zzap!64	13% (C64)
Commodore User	5/10 (C64)
Computer Gamer	45%

Some critics perceived the game as a disappointment considering the Judge Dredd licence, although the ZX Spectrum version was generally well received. Mike Pattenden of Commodore User considered the gameplay repetitive and wrote that the game's major problem "is that you run around pretty aimlessly. The crimes and their perps are rather unexciting. An arson attack for example never seems to be accompanied by any actual evidence of fire or smoke whatsoever."

ZX Computing wrote that the game "captures the atmosphere of crime fighting in the future although it has strayed from the comic character which will no doubt annoy the connoisseurs. The rest of us will love it." Jim Douglas of Sinclair User praised the game as a good use of the Judge Dredd licence. Mike Roberts of Computer Gamer had mixed feelings, writing that the game suffered from having "a nodding deference to Judge Dredd which restricted the gameplay slightly," but that it also failed by "not being accurate enough to the character." Roberts also opined that the game felt rushed and unfinished.

The graphics received a mixed reception, with reviewers for Crash and Zzap!64 writing negatively. Phil South of Your Sinclair praised the game and its graphics. Pattenden wrote that "there's some nice graphics and touches but no absorbing gameplay to go with it." Roberts praised the background graphics. Some reviewers disliked the music used in the C64 version, and Crash was critical of the ZX Spectrum version for its lack of music. Manfred Kleimann, writing for the German magazine Aktueller Software Markt, praised the graphics and sound of the C64 version.

Graeme Mason of Eurogamer wrote in 2017 that "there wasn't much for fans of the comic strip to sink their teeth into, and the game inevitably felt rushed, with jerky controls and a half-arsed attempt to bring comic-book stylings to the screen."
