= Pssst =

1983 video game

- Cover art
- Developer: Tim and Chris Stamper
- Publisher: Ultimate Play the Game
- Platform: ZX Spectrum
- Release: UK: June 1983
- Genre: Action
- Modes: Single player, 2 players (hotseat)

Pssst is an action video game developed and published by Ultimate Play the Game that was released for the ZX Spectrum in June 1983. In the game, Robbie the Robot has to protect his plant (a Thyrgodian Megga Chrisanthodil) as it is attacked by various insects, each of which needs a different repellent to neutralise it. Pssst was the second game to be released by Ultimate, after Jetpac.

The game was written by Chris Stamper and graphics were designed by his brother, Tim Stamper. The game received positive reviews from two publications upon release, with critics mainly praising its presentation and gameplay.

== Gameplay ==
The player has protected the plant from parasites, causing it to flower and end the level.

The game is presented from a single, 2D perspective, and revolves around Robbie the Robot's objective to defend his plant from interstellar space slugs, leeches and midges. The plant grows from the bottom centre of the screen, and spray cans containing three different pesticides are located on ledges on each side of the screen. Bonus items such as fertiliser and fly swatters appear on unoccupied ledges which will increase both the players score and the plant's growth rate.

There are three types of parasite, and three types of coloured pesticide, which will either kill, stun, or have no effect on the parasites. The player can only carry one type of pesticide at a time; during the early stages of the game the lethal pesticide can be carried at all times, but later stages have more than one type of parasite on screen at once, making the choice of pesticide more tactical.

As the plant grows it may sprout leaves; these increase the growth rate but also vulnerability to the parasites. Once the plant reaches a predetermined height it flowers and the player advances to the next level. A life will be deducted whenever the plant dies or the player makes contact with a parasite.

Every fifth level when completed reveals a female version of Robbie on the flower and grants an extra life.

== Development ==
Pssst is one of the few Spectrum games also available in ROM format for use with the Interface 2, allowing instantaneous loading of the game when the normal method of cassette loading could take several minutes. The game used the common technique of sprites and allowing them to be placed atop each other, which often overlapped colours on the screen causing attribute clash. Pssst was also able to run on the 16K version of the Spectrum.

== Reception ==
Reception

Review scores
Publication	Score
Home Computing Weekly	5/5
Personal Computer News	4/5
Your Computer	4/5
ZX Computing	27,5/30

Paul Liptrot of Home Computing Weekly praised the graphics, stating them as overall "smooth-moving" and colourful, as well as praising the "addictive" gameplay. ZX Computing considered the game as very professionally written and produced, with excellently smooth and detailed graphics. In addition, the review stated originality, addictivity and enjoyability of Pssst.

Pssst reached number 10 in the MRIB Top 30 software charts in July 1983 while Jetpac was still at number 1. In the fourth issue of Personal Computer Games, Pssst was nominated for a 1983 game of the year list on account of Ultimate's "famous graphics". According to the reviewer, other attributes of the game included its "originality" and "fun" in comparison to other Ultimate titles that were released in 1983.

The game was voted the second best original game at the Computer and Video Games 1983 Golden Joystick Awards, losing to Imagine Software's Ah Diddums.
