= Marsport =

1985 video game

- Cover art
- Developer: Gargoyle Games
- Publisher: Gargoyle Games
- Designers: Greg Follis; Roy Carter
- Platforms: Amstrad CPC; ZX Spectrum
- Release: 1985
- Genre: Arcade adventure
- Mode: Single-player

Marsport is a science fiction computer game that was released for the ZX Spectrum and Amstrad CPC home computers in 1985. It was published by Gargoyle Games in the United Kingdom and Dro Soft in Spain. Marsport was intended to be the first part of a trilogy called "The Siege of Earth" but parts two and three (Fornax and Gath) were not forthcoming. Because of this, it is often regarded as being part of an unofficial trilogy alongside Tir Na Nog and Dun Darach (both of which are part of the same official series) due to its having very similar gameplay to these titles. Marsport also has similarities to the later Gargoyle game Heavy on the Magick.

== Story ==
The year is 2494. For seventy years, the Earth has been under siege by the insectoid Sept. Since the siege began, the Sept have been kept at bay by a huge Force Sphere which surrounds the Earth and the Moon. However, the Sept are on the verge of discovering how to breach the Sphere unless it can be strengthened according to the formulae contained in the original plans. Unfortunately, these plans are concealed somewhere in the Martian city of Marsport, now Sept-occupied and booby-trapped by the city's M-Central computer. One man, Commander John Marsh, has been sent to retrieve the plans in the belief that a determined man can sometimes achieve more than an army.

== Development ==
Marsport was developed and published by Gargoyle Games. It was planned to be the first of the "Siege of Earth" trilogy, with its sequels "Fornax" and "Gath" were set for release in January and April 1986.

== Reception ==
Reception

Review scores
Publication	Score
Amstrad Action	95%
Amtix	94%
Crash	95%
Computer and Video Games	33/40
Sinclair User	5/5

Award
Publication	Award
Amstrad Action	Mastergame

Marsport received positive reviews on release.
