= Monty on the Run =

1985 video game

- Commodore 64 cover art
- Developer: Peter Harrap
- Publishers: EU: Gremlin Graphics; JP: Jaleco
- Composers: Rob Hubbard; Kazuo Sawa (Famicom Disk System)
- Platforms: Commodore 64, Amstrad CPC, Commodore 16, ZX Spectrum, Famicom Disk System
- Release: 25 October 1985: Amstrad CPC / Commodore 64 / ZX Spectrum; EU: 25 October 1985 Commodore 16; EU: 1986 Famicom Disk System; JP: July 31, 1987
- Genre: Platform
- Mode: Single-player

Monty on the Run is a computer game created by the software house Gremlin Graphics and released in 1985 for the Commodore 64, ZX Spectrum, Amstrad CPC and Commodore 16, written by Peter Harrap for the ZX Spectrum with the iconic in-game music on the Commodore 64 provided by Rob Hubbard. It is the third game in the Monty Mole series.

== Gameplay ==
Commodore 64 version screenshot

On the run from the authorities after his intervention in the Miners' strike, Monty the mole must escape from his house and head for the English Channel and freedom in Continental Europe. In traditional platform game fashion, along the way he needs to collect various objects and solve puzzles to complete his escape. Before the game, five objects must be chosen to form Monty's Freedom Kit. Choosing the wrong items will leave the player unable to pass certain screens. The final screen sees Monty boarding a ferry to France. This was then the starting point for the follow-up Auf Wiedersehen Monty.

The game has a sense of British surrealness similar to Manic Miner and Jet Set Willy - in gameplay it is more similar to the latter. Enemies patrol every screen, water is deadly to the touch and Monty runs the risk of being squashed by the many Mole Crushers.

== Ports ==
The Commodore 64 version was produced by Micro Projects Ltd, joint owned by Anthony Clarke and Jason Perkins, with graphical input by Mark Rodgers and music by Rob Hubbard. The music for the Commodore 64 version is regarded as one of the best computer game scores for that platform. The main game theme was, according to Hubbard, inspired by "Devil's Galop", the theme tune to the radio serial Dick Barton. It was rated #2 in Hardcore Gaming 101's Top 100 Western Video Game Music of all time.

A remake, titled Monty's Great Heart-pounding Escape (モンティのドキドキ大脱走, Monti no Doki Doki Dai Dassō) was created for the Famicom Disk System in 1987 by Jaleco. The game bears very little resemblance to the original version. For instance, Monty Mole has been replaced with a human on the run from prison and now has to escape through various Aztec-like temples. The only real association the game does have with the original is Gremlin's copyright and the familiar "in-game" theme playing on the title screen. Like many Famicom Disk System titles, Monty's Great Heart-pounding Escape is little known outside Japan as the game was never ported to cartridge for a Western NES release.

== Reception ==
Reception

Review scores
Publication	Score
Crash	94% (Spectrum)
Zzap!64	90% (C64)

Award
Publication	Award
Crash	Crash Smash

The game was critically and commercially successful in the UK. The Commodore 64 version was given a 90% overall rating by the reviewers of Zzap!64, while Crash magazine gave the Spectrum version an overall score of 94%.

The game entered the Spectrum, Commodore and All-Format charts at number one.

The game was voted second best platform game in the 1985 Computer Gamer Game of the Year Awards behind Impossible Mission. In 1991, Commodore Format listed the game as one of the 100 best Commodore 64 games. In 2007, the game was placed in 20th position in Retro Gamer's readers poll of the Top 25 Platformers Of All Time.

In 1989 the game was re-released on U.S. Gold's Kixx budget label with ACE calling it an "all-time platform classic" and Crash describing the game as "still busting with playability" despite its age.

In 1990, Patricia Hartley and Kirk Lesser attempted to review the game for the Dragon role-playing game magazine when it was released as part of Mastertronic's "MEGA Pack" of 10 games previously released in Europe. They stated that "it crashed every time we tried to play it" and awarded the game an "X" for "Not recommended" rather than a normal rating from 1 to 5 stars.
