= IBall =

IBall or iBall can refer to:

- IBall (company), a consumer electronics company headquartered in Andheri, Mumbai, India
- iBall (toy), a kinetic toy that displays Newton's Laws

== See also ==
- I, Ball, a shoot'em up computer game
- Iballë, a village in Albania
- "iBalls", an episode of iCarly
