= Kentilla =

1984 video game

- Developer: Derek Brewster
- Publishers: Micromega, Mastertronic
- Composer: Rob Hubbard
- Platforms: Amstrad CPC, ZX Spectrum, Commodore 64
- Release: 1984
- Genre: Interactive fiction
- Mode: Single-player

Kentilla is a text adventure game written by British developer Derek Brewster and published by Micromega in 1984.

It was re-released as a budget title in 1986 by Mastertronic who ported the game to the Commodore 64 with music by composer Rob Hubbard.

== Reception ==
Reception

Review scores
Publication	Score
Crash	10/10
Sinclair User	6/10
Your Sinclair	6/10

Award
Publication	Award
Crash	Crash Smash

Crash were impressed by the Spectrum version of the game, stating "Kentilla is a sure winner as an adventure with many devious problems which should keep any adventurer busy through the coming winter months and it's excellent value for money." It was given a 10/10 Overall rating.

Zzap!64 enjoyed the Commodore 64 version which was given a 90% overall rating.
