= Scooby-Doo (video game) =

1986 video game

- C64 box art
- Developer: Gargoyle Games
- Publisher: Elite Systems
- Designers: Greg Follis; Roy Carter
- Platforms: ZX Spectrum, Amstrad CPC, Commodore 64, Plus/4
- Release: 1986
- Genre: Action
- Mode: Single-player

Scooby-Doo (also known as Scooby-Doo in the Castle Mystery) is an action game based on the television franchise of the same name. It was developed by Gargoyle Games for the ZX Spectrum, Amstrad CPC, Commodore 64, and Plus/4 and published in 1986 by Elite Systems.

== Gameplay ==
Gameplay screenshot

== Development ==
A much-hyped game, Elite first started advertising this from around Autumn 1985. The advert billed the game as "the first ever computer cartoon". Issue 21 of Crash carried a full preview of the game.

The game was to feature all the characters from the cartoon and was set in a Scottish castle owned by Shaggy's auntie. The castle is haunted and Scooby and the gang have 48 hours to solve the mystery. The game is said to "feature seven or eight action sequences which are separated by descriptive scenes in which characters in the game interact by meeting together and having a chat..."

The original concept was scrapped as the Spectrum was not capable of handling such an ambitious project with Sinclair User reporting: "while the graphics in the game ... are supposedly unbelievable the game is a shambles. Lack of memory has been blamed for the failure to release the game". Gargoyle Games were then contracted by Elite to produce a less-ambitious version.

== Reception ==
Reception

Review scores
Publication	Score
Amtix	95%
Crash	91%
Sinclair User	4/5
Your Sinclair	9/10
Zzap!64	42%

Award
Publication	Award
Crash	Crash Smash

Reviewing the Spectrum version, the critics of Crash praised that the game is addictive, well-animated, and "extremely playable", though one of them remarked that the simplistic gameplay's lack of challenge made it wear thin before long. Your Sinclair rated the game with a score 9/10.
