= Hollywood or Bust (video game) =

1986 video game

- Cover art
- Publishers: NA: Mastertronic; EU: Mastertronic
- Composer: Rob Hubbard
- Platforms: Commodore 64, Amstrad CPC
- Release: NA: 1986; EU: August 1986
- Genre: Action
- Mode: Single Player

Hollywood or Bust is an action game published by Mastertronic in 1986 for the Commodore 64 and Amstrad CPC.

== Gameplay ==
The character is a wannabe film star named Buster—possibly after Buster Keaton to who he bears a resemblance. The character wanders around a 1920s film set, searching for five Oscar Statues while being chased by a series of Policemen. The studios are also haunted by a number of ghosts who attack Buster at random. If Buster comes into contact with either one, the game ends.

During his search, Buster can occasionally find himself in the middle of a street scene where he has to survive wave after wave of policemen. Fortunately he can defend himself with a number of Custard Pies which can be replenished by turning a tap at the top right of the screen. Once the timer runs to zero, Buster finds himself back in the studio where he resumed the hunt for the Oscars which have to be collected in numerical order.

If Buster is successful in collecting all five Oscars, the game ends as Buster is awarded a lifetime contract with the studio. Failure results in the director yelling "Cut" and the game beginning again.
