= Faster Than Light (software publisher) =

British video game publisher

- Industry: Software
- Key people: Greg Follis, Roy Carter (owners of Gargoyle Games)
- Parent: Gargoyle Games

Faster Than Light (FTL) was a software publishing label established by UK video game publisher Gargoyle Games. The aim was for FTL to publish arcade-style games, while Gargoyle would concentrate on its core business of adventure games.

== Games ==
- Light Force (1986) was a vertically scrolling shoot 'em up with a large main ship. The player had to survive alien attacks in four different sectors of the planet Regulus.
- Hydrofool (1987) was an isometric 3D game set in a giant aquarium, and a sequel to the similar (though drier) Sweevo's World. The player had to avoid fish and collect objects with the ultimate aim of pulling out enough plugs to drain the aquarium.
- Shockway Rider (1987) was set in the future, where gangs of thugs roamed the moving walkways built around a huge city. The player had to collect weapons and bonus objects, and go "full circle" by surviving the perilous journey through the eight districts.
