= Gargoyle Games =

British video game developer

- Industry: Video games
- Founded: Dudley, England, 1983
- Founder: Roy Carter, Greg Follis
- Fate: Dissolved
- Headquarters: Dudley, England
- Key people: Ted Heathcote

Gargoyle Games was a British software company founded in 1983 by Roy Carter and Greg Follis in order to publish their first game, Ad Astra. They generally specialized in games for the ZX Spectrum even though the company was originally named with the intention of publishing games for Dragon computers. They later created a new label specifically for arcade-style games, Faster Than Light (FTL), as well as developing titles for Elite Systems.

Two of Gargoyle's releases, Marsport and Heavy on the Magick, were intended to be the first in a series of games but the planned sequels were never released. Marsport is often considered an unofficial companion to Tir Na Nog and Dun Darach due to its similar gameplay. Tir Na Nog and Dun Darach are part of the same series, with Dun Darach being a prequel released the following year.

== Games developed ==
- Ad Astra (1984)
- Tir Na Nog (1984)
- Dun Darach (1985)
- Marsport (1985)
- Sweevo's World (1985)
- Sweevo's Whirled (1986), an enhanced version of Sweevo's World for the 128k Spectrum
- Heavy on the Magick (1986)
- Light Force (FTL, 1986)
- Scooby Doo in the Castle Mystery (Elite Systems, 1986)
- Shockway Rider (FTL, 1987)
- Hydrofool (FTL, 1987)
- Thundercats (Elite Systems, 1987)
- Supertrux (Elite Systems, 1989)
