= Light Force =

1986 shooter game

- Spectrum cover art
- Developer: Gargoyle Games
- Publisher: Faster Than Light
- Designers: Greg Follis; Roy Carter
- Composer: Rob Hubbard (C64)
- Platforms: Amstrad CPC, Commodore 64, ZX Spectrum
- Release: 1986
- Genre: Scrolling shooter
- Mode: Single-player

Light Force is a 1986 vertically scrolling shooter designed by Greg Follis and Roy Carter, developed by their company Gargoyle Games, and published under their Faster Than Light imprint. It was released for the Amstrad CPC, Commodore 64, and ZX Spectrum platforms.

The player controls a spaceship which must defeat waves of attacking enemies in five different levels. Light Force received positive reviews from video games critics, later being ranked as one of the best games for the Spectrum by multiple gaming magazines. The game was a commercial success, with the Spectrum version debuting at number two in the UK sales charts.

== Gameplay ==
The "Light Force" navigating through the jungle level.

Light Force is a vertically scrolling shooter. The player controls a "Light Force" flightcraft in the Regulus system, tasked as the only fighter in the area to fight off a species of aliens taking over the peaceful system. The game spans five levels, ranging from a jungle section, an asteroid belt, an ice planet, desert planet, and ends at the aliens' factories. Every level has the player tasked with shooting down multiple waves of enemy spaceships to progress to the next level. Weapon upgrades and a shield for your ship can be acquired as you progress. After completing the last level, the game loops back to the first. The game has a high score feature, where the player can get point bonuses for completing optional objectives, like destroying all alien buildings.

== Development ==
Light Force is the first game published under Gargoyle Games' Faster Than Light label. The company's co-founder Greg Follis explained that Faster Than Light was originally the title of the game, but he considered it "too good to waste". The game was the first to use "Lasermation" for the graphics, which was described by Gargoyle director Ted Heathcote as "a new technique for showing really vivid high speed animation". Rob Hubbard was the composer for the Commodore 64 version. It was released in 1986 for the Amstrad CPC, Commodore 64, and ZX Spectrum computers.

== Reception ==
Reception

Review scores
Publication	Score
Amtix	85%
Crash	91%
Computer and Video Games	33/40
Sinclair User	5/5
Your Sinclair	7/10
Zzap!64	87%

Awards
Publication	Award
Crash	Crash Smash
Sinclair User	SU Classic

According to MicroScope, the ZX Spectrum version of Light Force debuted at number two in the UK sales charts, behind Paperboy. It dropped down to number three the following week. All three versions of the game received positive reviews from video game critics. Graham Taylor for Sinclair User called it "the ultimate blaster" and "essential purchase". One reviewer for Amtix considered it to be one of the best shoot 'em ups for the Amstrad. Crash praised its graphics, calling it the best he has seen on a Spectrum shoot 'em up. Computer and Video Games' Tim Metcalfe positively compared it to Galaxian. Zzap!64 said that the title was appropriate for fans of scrolling shooter genre.

The game won the award for best graphics of the year according to the readers of Crash, and was nominated in the "Best Shoot 'em up" and "State of the Art award" categories. In 1991, Crash placed it 82nd in their list of the top 100 games for the Spectrum. The Spectrum version was rated number 26 in the Your Sinclair "Official Top 100 Games of All Time" list.
