= Monty Is Innocent =

1985 video game

- Developer: Chris Kerry
- Publisher: Gremlin Graphics
- Platform: ZX Spectrum
- Release: EU: 1985
- Genre: Action-adventure
- Mode: Single-player

Monty Is Innocent is a video game written by Chris Kerry for the ZX Spectrum and published by Gremlin Graphics in 1985. It is a sequel to Wanted: Monty Mole released the previous year. While the game was marketed as Monty Is Innocent, it is never referred to by that title in-game; instead it merely displays Great Escape!. The inlay also features this title, on the newspaper that Monty Mole is reading in his cell.

== Story ==
Monty Mole has been sentenced to five years in Scudmore Prison for stealing a bucket of coal. Monty's best friend, the mysterious masked rodent, Sam Stoat, is determined to set Monty free. Sam must face the evil forces, lurking in the depths of Scudmore, and rescue Monty.

== Gameplay ==
While billed as a sequel to the game Wanted: Monty Mole, Monty Is Innocent is very different; in addition to the obvious difference (the player controls Sam Stoat, rather than Monty) the previous Monty Mole game was a platform game whereas Monty Is Innocent is a linked, multi-screen 3D maze game. The player must collect a key from the Governor's office to open a cell door. There are eight keys (which open eight doors) and the player must return to the office each time until the key to open Monty's cell is found. A number of bottles containing a magic disappearing potion can be found around the prison, which will cause Sam to become invisible for a short time. There is also an armoury which contains an endless supply of guns, although the weapons have only five bullets each.

Points are scored for completing the game; the faster the game is completed, the more points are awarded.

== Reception ==
Reception

Review scores
Publication	Score
Crash	78%
Sinclair User	7/10,
Sinclair Programs	40%,

Reviews were mixed, with CRASH giving the game 78% and Sinclair User awarding 7/10, while Sinclair Programs gave only 40%.

CRASH declared that "Monty Is Innocent is great. It's really colourful and although the graphic movement is not ultra-smooth, it's okay", and Your Computer said that "plenty of imagination has been used to create the backdrops - there are a couple of good 3D mazes and an ingenious sequence in a gymnasium". Sinclair Programs said that, while the idea behind the game was good, it was "badly presented. Doors to other screens are often invisible, and the 3D pictures are confusing" and declaring that "the game is not a patch on Wanted: Monty Mole".
