= David Darling (businessman) =

British video game developer (born 1966)

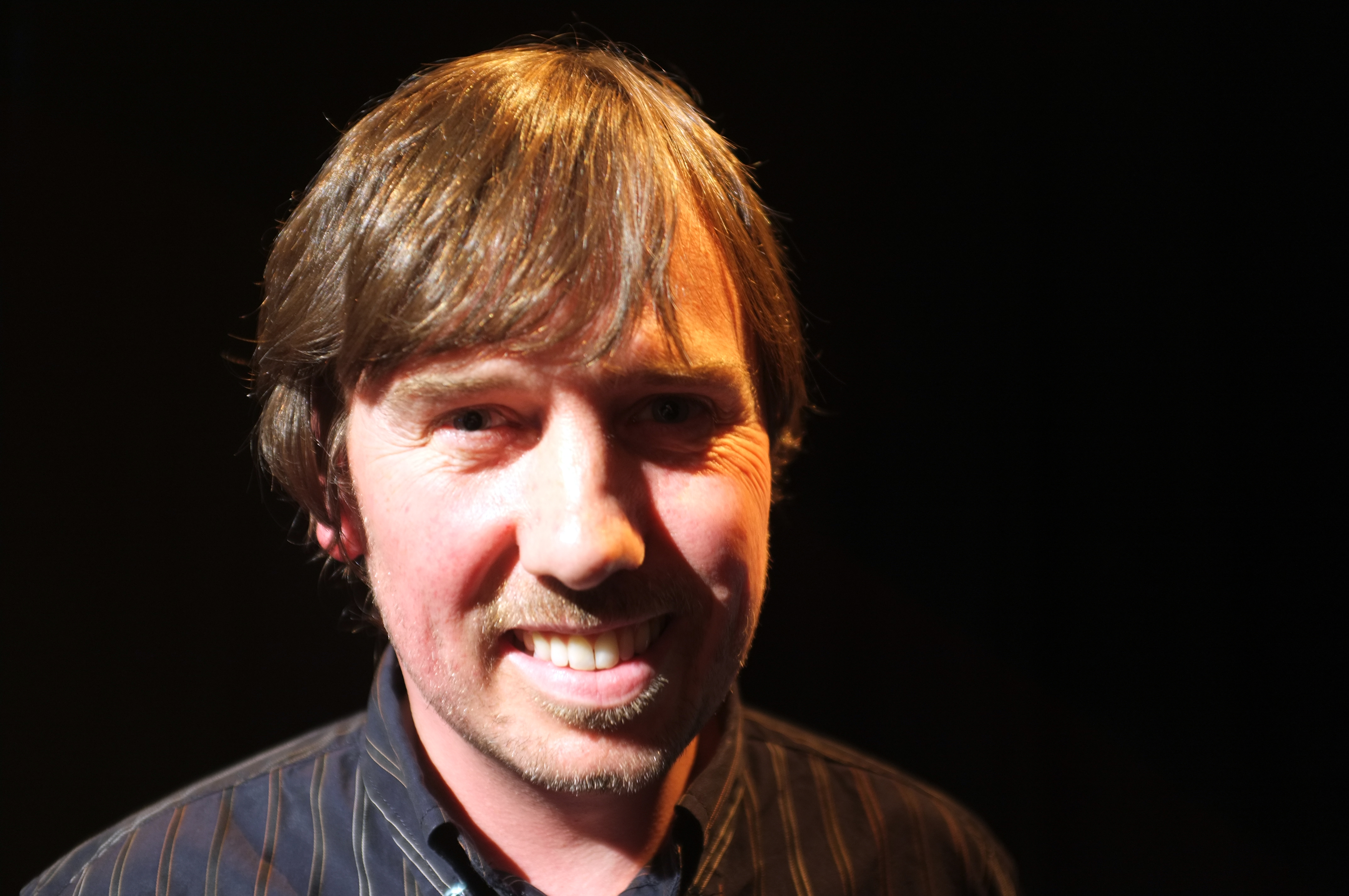
- CEO of Kwalee
- Born: 16 June 1966 (age 60); London, England
- Occupations: Entrepreneur; video game designer
- Years active: 1986–present
- Website: David Darling's Blog

David Darling CBE (born 17 June 1966 in London) is a British video game developer and entrepreneur, known for co-founding Codemasters, with his brother Richard Darling, and for being involved in a long succession of top ten games over more than 30 years. He is now founder and CEO of smartphone app developer and publisher Kwalee.

== Early life ==
Darling's father was a contact lens pioneer married to an Australian; they had 7 children. In his early life Darling lived on three continents—in the UK, in the Netherlands, in Australia, in France and in Canada—before finally settling in Crewkerne, Somerset. While in France, the family lived on a boat and traveled through the country, settling for a time in Cap d'Agde.

Darling and his brother were influenced to learn computer coding at a young age by their grandfather, an electronic engineer, who designed some of the first colour TVs in Australia. Later, when they moved to Canada at age 11, their maths teacher introduced them to computer programming and they used the school computer room with the help of a friendly janitor. Darling would often stay behind after school to program, as there was only one keyboard available in the classroom. During the day he would have to use punch cards while other children had access to the sole keyboard.

Darling moved to England when he was 13 and attended Wadham School where he took classes in Computer Studies. Darling has said that while the school was generally encouraging about new technology but very discouraging about games. On one occasion he submitted course work about a computer game and was told "computer games are a waste of time".

== Codemasters ==
After their father bought a Commodore PET for his business, Darling and his brother starting writing video games during the weekend when Darling was 14 years old. In 1982, when Darling was 16, the brothers were selling games via small advertisements in magazines such as Popular Computing Weekly. Soon they were earning more money than their father, who helped them to manage the burgeoning business. They formed the company Galactic Software and supplied a succession of games to be published by Mastertronic, including The Last V8 (published under their MAD brand), one of several titles written by Darling.

Codemasters was formed in 1986 by Darling with his brother Richard and his father Jim to publish their games themselves. Initially it was housed in an industrial unit in Banbury, Oxfordshire, then moved to offices converted from the stables, barns and other outbuildings at Lower Farm House, outside Southam, Warwickshire.

In the beginning, Codemasters concentrated on "budget" games priced between £1.99 and £2.99 for 8-bit home computers such as the ZX Spectrum and Commodore 64. With titles such as BMX Simulator, Rock Star Ate My Hamster and Pro Skateboard Simulator. Codemasters developed a reputation for innovation with features such as simultaneous four player gaming. They also had major success with the Dizzy series of games developed by the Oliver Twins, who later went on to found Blitz Games Studios. Within the first year of trading Codemasters was the best selling game publisher in Britain with in excess of 27% of the total market according to the Gallup charts.

In 1990 Darling co-developed the Game Genie, a game modification device for the Nintendo Entertainment System and other game consoles; this went on to become the 5th best selling toy in the United States of America in Christmas 1991.

Codemasters evolved as a game developer to produce full price games across all current platforms, sold globally. Notable successes included the Colin McRae Rally series and Operation Flashpoint.

The Darling brothers sold their interests in Codemasters in 2007.

In the Queen's birthday honours in 2008, Darling was made a Commander of the Order of the British Empire (CBE) for "services to the computer games industry".

== Kwalee ==
In 2011, Darling founded Kwalee in Leamington Spa, Warwickshire to develop and publish smartphone applications.

In July 2012, Darling used his personal blog on the Kwalee website to say that video game consoles have become "like dinosaurs heading for extinction." He elaborates by saying he believes that Apple and Google will take over the market which was once established by the likes of Nintendo, Sony and Microsoft.

In the same month, Darling also met with Vince Cable MP to discuss the British Government's plans for business growth in Leamington Spa.

== Personal life ==
He lives in Warwickshire, England.

== See also ==
- Video gaming in the United Kingdom
