= Warhawk =

A war hawk is a person who actively supports a war.

War hawk, Warhawk or similar may also refer to:

== Military ==
- Curtiss P-40 Warhawk, an American World War II-era fighter aircraft
- 195th Fighter Squadron, a unit of the Arizona Air National Guard stationed in Tucson, Arizona
- 314th Fighter Squadron, a training unit of the United States Air Force stationed in New Mexico
- 480th Fighter Squadron, a unit of the United States Air Force stationed in Germany

== Athletic teams in the United States ==
- Arrowhead High School, Merton Town, Wisconsin
- Auburn Montgomery Warhawks, Auburn University at Montgomery, Alabama
- Calhoun Community College, Tanner, Alabama
- Great Crossing High School, Georgetown, Kentucky
- James Madison High School (California)
- James Madison High School (Fairfax County, Virginia)
- Louisiana–Monroe Warhawks, University of Louisiana at Monroe
- McMurry University
- Mount Vernon–Enola High School, Arkansas
- North Chicago Community High School, Chicago, Illinois
- North Mahaska Community High School, North Mahaska Community School District, New Sharon, Iowa
- Seminole High School (Pinellas County, Florida)
- Westerville Central High School, Ohio
- Willmar WarHawks, Willmar, Minnesota
- Wisconsin–Whitewater Warhawks, University of Wisconsin–Whitewater
- Veterans High School, Kathleen, Georgia

== Video games ==
- Warhawk (1986 video game), a vertically scrolling video game, released by Firebird software
- Warhawk (1995 video game), a Sony PlayStation game
- Warhawk (2007 video game), a multiplayer-only PlayStation 3 remake of the PlayStation game

== Other ==
- Warhawk (Marvel Comics), a number of Marvel Comics characters
- Warhawk (DC Comics), a character from DC Comics
- Warhawk, a series of gamefowl feeds under a Philippine feedmill Popular Feedmill Corporation (PFC), that specializes provided nutrition for gamefowls at various stages of development
