= Master of Magic (1985 video game) =

- Publisher: Mastertronic Added Dimension
- Designer: Richard Darling
- Programmer: Richard Darling
- Artist: James Wilson
- Composer: Rob Hubbard
- Platforms: ZX Spectrum, C64
- Release: December 1985
- Genre: Role-playing
- Mode: Single player

Master of Magic is a role-playing video game for the Commodore 64 and ZX Spectrum home computers. It was distributed by Mastertronic in 1985 under its M.A.D. label.

== Description ==
The player controls an unnamed hero who has been dragged into a strange world by Thelric the Master of Magic while exploring caverns. Thelric is looking for an amulet which will provide him with immortality and, having taught the hero a few spells, sets him on a quest to find this artifact.

== Music ==
The music for the Commodore 64 version was written by Rob Hubbard and is an arrangement of the track Shibolet by Synergy (on the album Audion).

== Reception ==
Zzap!64 were impressed by the game, awarding it a score of 88%. Your Sinclair's review of the Spectrum version said that it was "a lot of fun to play".

The game also received reviews in contemporary gaming magazines, such as Sinclair User, Crash, ZX Computing, Computer Gamer and MicroHobby.
