= Press Play =

Press Play may refer to:

== Film ==
- Press Play (film), a 2022 American film
- Press Play, a 2006 short film featuring Sam Loggin

== Music ==
- Press Play (band), a 2008–2014 American Christian pop-rock band
- Press Play (album), by Diddy (Sean Combs), 2006
- Press Play, an album by Relâche, 2006
- Press Play (BtoB EP), or the title song, 2012
- Press Play (Lisa EP), 2026
- "Press Play", a song by Nicki Minaj from Pink Friday 2, 2023
- "Press Play", a song by Snoop Dogg from Ego Trippin', 2008

== Other uses ==
- Press Play (company), a defunct Danish game development studio
- Press Play, a news and culture radio program hosted by Madeleine Brand on KCRW-FM
- PressPlay, a defunct online music store

== See also ==
- Press Play On Tape, a Danish band
- Press to Play, a 1986 album by Paul McCartney
