= Hydrofool =

1987 video game

- Developer: Gargoyle Games
- Publisher: Faster Than Light
- Designers: Roy Carter; Greg Follis
- Composer: Rob Hubbard
- Platforms: ZX Spectrum, Amstrad CPC
- Release: 1987
- Genre: Action-adventure
- Mode: Single-player

Hydrofool is an isometric 3D action-adventure game released by FTL in 1987 for the ZX Spectrum and Amstrad CPC. It is the sequel to Sweevo's World. The game music was composed by Rob Hubbard, with the title track based on Abe Holzmann's "Blaze Away!"

== Plot ==
The gigantic aquarium known as the "Deathbowl" has become so heavily polluted that the only remedy is to completely drain it by pulling out each of its four plugs. The robot Sweevo has been ordered to perform this task.

== Gameplay ==
Sweevo must swim through the caverns of the Deathbowl finding and pulling the plugs in the correct order. To pull a plug several puzzles must be solved using the objects that scatter the floor of the aquarium. The Deathbowl is populated by creatures which will try to stop Sweevo from carrying out his task.

The Deathbowl is constructed of several superimposed levels and Sweevo can travel between them by riding bubbles or diving into whirlpools.

Sweevo begins to rust as soon as he enters the water and must complete his mission before he becomes incapacitated. Contact with dangerous creatures or structures will also cause rusting, while oil cans will remove some rust from him.

== Reviews ==
Reception

Awards
Publication	Award
Crash	Crash Smash
Sinclair User	SU Classic

Sinclair User: "The graphics are superb - particularly if you like fish..."

Your Sinclair: "All great fun. The graphics and sprites are all wonderfully clear and well thought out, and as usual with Gargoyle/FTL, the design's immaculate."

Crash: "The feel of the game relies heavily on the high quality graphics - Sweevo really does seem to be swimming underwater. With the large number of screens, and the intricately woven Greg Follis puzzles, Hydrofool should hold it's [sic] appeal for quite some time."
