= Auf Wiedersehen Monty =

1987 video game

- Developers: Peter Harrap; Shaun Hollingworth
- Publisher: Gremlin Graphics
- Composers: Rob Hubbard; Ben Daglish
- Platforms: Commodore 64, ZX Spectrum, Amstrad CPC, MSX, Commodore 16
- Release: 1987
- Genre: Platform
- Mode: Single-player

Auf Wiedersehen Monty (German for "Goodbye Monty") is a computer game for the ZX Spectrum, Commodore 64, Amstrad CPC, MSX and Commodore 16. Released in 1987, it is the fourth game in the Monty Mole series. It was written by Peter Harrap and Shaun Hollingworth with music by Rob Hubbard and Ben Daglish.

== Gameplay ==
Monty Mole in a cavern as shown in the C64 version.

The player controls Monty as he travels around Europe collecting money in order to buy a Greek island - Montos, where he can safely retire. Gameplay is in the style of a flick-screen platform game, similar to many such games of the 1980s such as Technician Ted and Jet Set Willy. Some screens (such as those representing the Eiffel Tower and the Pyrenees) bear some relation to their real-life counterparts but most are just typical platform game screens.

Auf Wiedersehen Monty contains many features and peculiarities for the player to discover. Examples include being suddenly attacked by a bull's head in Spain after collecting a red cape (presumably a reference to bullfighting), a car being dropped in one of two places on entering a screen representing Düsseldorf in West Germany, a chef's hat found in Sweden (a reference to the Swedish Chef of Muppets fame; also, the two rooms representing Sweden are subtitled Bjorn and Borg), and a record in Luxembourg that when collected makes Monty breakdance to the game's title music (this may be a reference to Radio Luxembourg).

It is possible to get to areas of the game more quickly by flying from an airport using air tickets which can be collected throughout the game. Some parts of the game can only be reached in this manner.

As well as money, there are other miscellaneous objects to collect in the game for points. This was important as the player needs a certain number of points to get to Montos. These are often particular to the country Monty is visiting (such as berets in France). Bottles of wine or a glass of beer in West Germany cause Monty to briefly become drunk and his control to become slightly erratic leading to a reversal of controls, repeated jumping or Monty climbing any ladders or drainpipes he encounters.

== Reception ==
Reception

Award
| Publication | Award |
|---|---|
| Your Sinclair | YS Megagame |

- The game won the award for best platform game of the year according to the readers of Crash magazine.
- The game was voted number 57 in the Your Sinclair Readers' Top 100 Games of All Time.

== Sequels ==
Moley Christmas was released later in the same year. A further Monty Mole game, Impossamole, was released in 1990. It took a different form to the previous games, being more of a console-style arcade game.
