= Rob Hubbard =

British composer (born 1955)

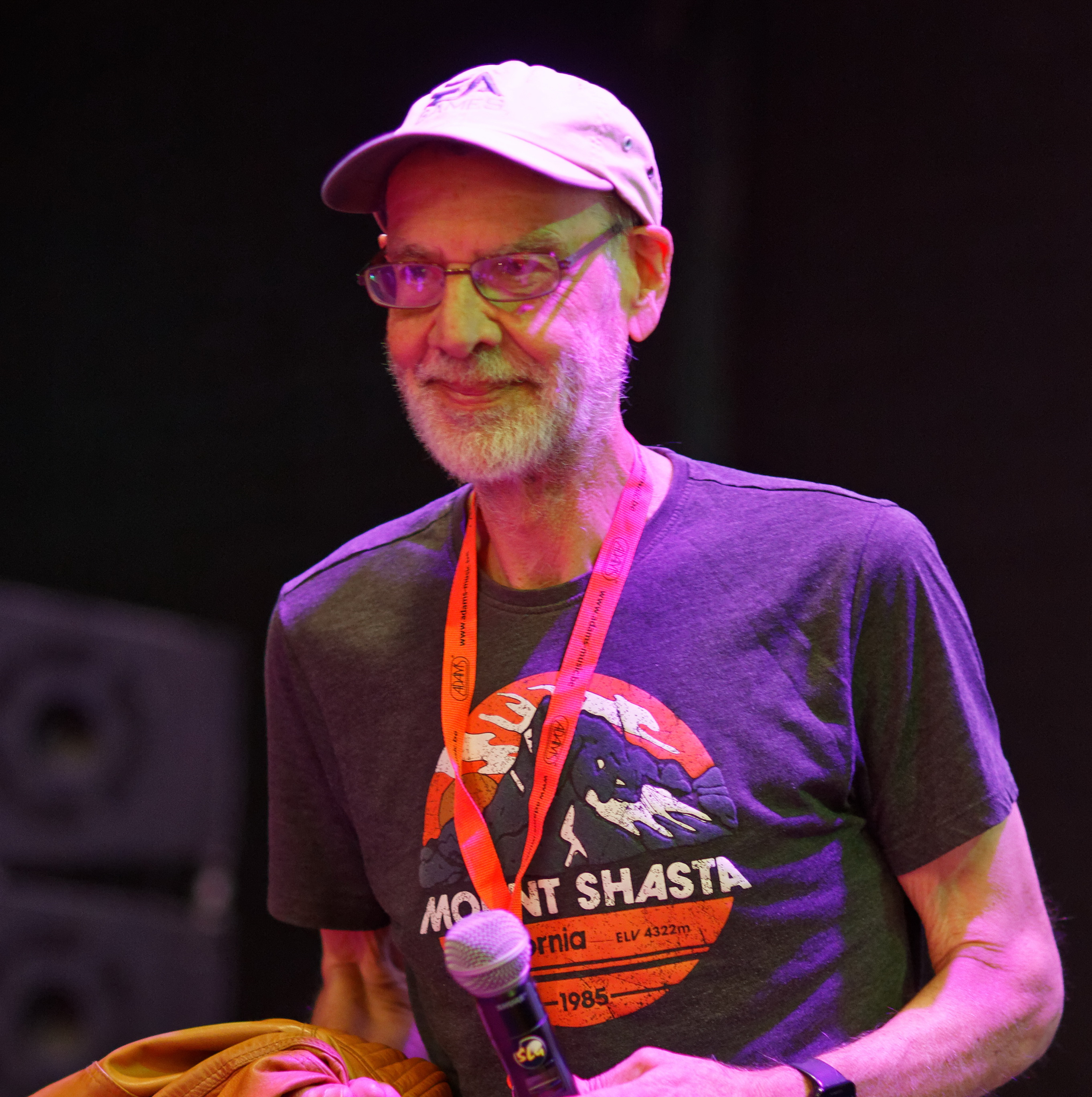
- Hubbard in 2023

Background information
- Born: 1955 (age 70–71); Kingston upon Hull, England
- Genres: Video game music, Chiptune
- Occupations: Composer, programmer
- Years active: 1985–1996, 2004–present

Rob Hubbard (born 1955) is a British composer best known for his musical and programming work for microcomputers of the 1980s, in particular the Commodore 64.

== Biography ==
=== Early life and career ===
Hubbard was born in 1955 in Kingston upon Hull, England. Hubbard first started playing music at age seven. Whilst at school he played in bands. After leaving school, he went to music college. He mentioned Mozart, Stravinsky, Prokofiev, Ralph Vaughan Williams, John Williams, Jerry Goldsmith, Jean Michel Jarre and Larry Fast among his musical influences.

In the late seventies, before scoring games, he was a professional studio musician. He decided to teach himself BASIC and machine code for the Commodore 64. Rob explained how he acquired his first computer, the Commodore 64, and why he chose that specific computer in an interview, "The buzz that was around at the time was that musicians are gonna have to get into computers." He ended up with a Commodore 64 computer specifically because the other ones he knew of, only had 8k or 16k of memory.

=== Music on the Commodore 64 ===
Hubbard subsequently wrote or converted music for a variety of publishers on over 75 videogames between 1985 and 1989. Hubbard mainly composed for the Commodore 64's SID sound chip. He worked freelance and turned down offers from companies to work in-house. His first theme for a game was Thing on a Spring. Some of his most popular tunes include Commando, Monty on the Run, Sanxion, International Karate, Skate or Die!, Crazy Comets, Master of Magic, Delta, Thrust, Lightforce, Spellbound, One Man and his Droid. The game Knucklebusters includes Hubbard's longest tune: a 17-minute opus. Hubbard has mentioned his personal favourites are Sanxion, Kentilla, W.A.R., International Karate, and Crazy Comets. His least favourite was Samantha Fox Strip Poker, which he admitted to having done purely for money; he was listed in the game credits with the alias John York.

=== Move to Electronic Arts and the United States ===
After four years producing gaming music in the United Kingdom, Hubbard joined Electronic Arts in 1988 to develop professionally as a musician. He left Newcastle and had the choice to work for Electronic Arts or Microsoft. Hubbard chose EA due to their prominence in the gaming industry as Microsoft had (as yet) no gaming platform. His work with EA Electronic Arts in America was as a composer. He was the first person devoted to sound and music at EA and did everything from low-level programming to composing. One of his most famous compositions during his period at EA, is the music featured in the loading sequence of the Commodore 64 version of Skate or Die!, which features multiple sampled chords of electric guitar and organ. Playback of samples was facilitated by exploiting a feature in the SID sound-synthesizer chip: altering the volume register produces an audible click, and altering the register thousands of times per second enables a relatively crude (but surprisingly clear and sophisticated for eight-bit computers) form of sample playback. He eventually became Audio Technical Director, a more administrative job, deciding which technologies to use in games, and which to develop further.

After the Commodore 64 period, he wrote some soundtracks for games which appeared on the Amiga, Atari ST, IBM PC and Mega Drive, most notably Populous, Road Rash, and Desert Strike.

=== Recent activities ===
Hubbard contributed a few re-arrangements of his themes to Chris Abbott's C64 tribute Back in Time Live. Hubbard performed several times with the Danish C64 cover band PRESS PLAY ON TAPE who have covered many of his early tunes using a full rock-band arrangement. Hubbard has also performed his old music on piano with the support of violinist and fellow chiptune composer Mark Knight.

Hubbard left EA in 2002 and returned to England. He has recently resumed playing in a band, and he has revisited his past game-music work in concert. His recent compositions have included music for mobile-phone games.

In 2005, music from International Karate was performed live by a full orchestra at the third Symphonic Game Music Concert. The event took place in Leipzig, Germany. Hubbard arranged and orchestrated the piece.

In 2014, Hubbard appeared in and composed music for the documentary feature film From Bedrooms to Billions, a film that tells the story of the British video games industry.

In November 2016, Hubbard received an honorary degree from Abertay University for his contributions to video-game music in the 1980s.

== Works ==
Year	Title	Notes
1985	Commando	based on theme from Commando arcade game by Tamayo Kawamoto
1985	Rasputin	features traditional Russian songs
1985	Monty on the Run	partially based on "Devil's Galop" by Charles Williams
1985	Thing on a Spring	
1985	Confuzion	Cover of the song "Confuzion" by the band Private Property which was also on side B of the game cassette.
1985	Crazy Comets	Inspired by New Order and funk music.
1985	Chimera	
1985	Master of Magic	partially based on "Shibolet" from the Synergy album Audion
1985	The Last V8	
1985	Action Biker	
1985	Formula 1 Simulator	
1985	Hunter Patrol	
1985	One Man and His Droid	inspired by the song Maneater by Hall & Oates
1985	Battle of Britain	
1985	Harvey Smith Showjumping	
1985	Up, Up and Away	cover of a song by The 5th Dimension
1986	Deep Strike	
1986	Bump Set Spike	
1986	Ninja	
1986	Gerry the Germ	
1986	Proteus	based on two separate songs from John Keating's album Space Experience ("The Unknown Planet" and "Space Agent")
1986	Thrust	
1986	Warhawk	the same song as "Proteus", just an intro added
1986	Lightforce	He was paid £750 for the tune according to the developers (equivalent to £2324 in 2020) which they claim was an absolute bargain.
1986	Geoff Capes Strongman Challenge	
1986	Samantha Fox Strip Poker	credited as John York because as he said "[it] was such a cheesy title and they wanted that cheesy lame music along with it - I didn't want to admit that I did it just for the money". Contains "The Entertainer" by Scott Joplin and "The Stripper" by David Rose
1986	Tarzan	Based on the theme from 1960s TV show "Tarzan"
1986	W.A.R.	
1986	Zoids	based on the track "Ancestors" from the Synergy album Audion
1986	Flash Gordon	
1986	Spellbound	
1986	Hollywood or Bust	Covers of "12th Street Rag" by Euday L. Bowman and "Dill Pickles Rag" by Charles L. Johnson
1986	Human Race	
1986	Kentilla	
1986	Phantoms of the Asteroid	
1986	Chicken Song	From the TV show Spitting Image
1986	Video Poker	contains "Easy Winners" by Scott Joplin
1986	Knucklebusters	Hubbard's longest composition, lasting 17 minutes
1986	International Karate	parts are a pastiche of Ryuichi Sakamoto's "Forbidden Colours" from "Merry Christmas, Mr. Lawrence"
1986	Sanxion	in addition to Hubbard's famous loader song, this contains "Dance of the Knights" from Prokofiev's ballet "Romeo and Juliet"
1987	Jet Set Willy	Atari 8-bit version
1987	ACE II	
1987	BMX Kids	the sampled voice saying "Go!" is actually Hubbard himself!
1987	Saboteur II	
1987	Sigma 7	Commodore 64 arrangement by Hubbard; Amstrad original by Julian Breeze
1987	Thanatos	Commodore 64 arrangement by Hubbard; Amstrad original by Julian Breeze
1987	Thundercats	
1987	Arcade Classics	
1987	I-Ball	inspired by "Whip Blow" and "I Want You" by Cabaret Voltaire
1987	Hydrofool	
1987	Shockway Rider	
1987	Auf Wiedersehen Monty	with Ben Daglish
1987	Chain Reaction	
1987	Mega Apocalypse	Re-arrangement of "Crazy Comets"
1987	Nemesis the Warlock	
1987	Wiz	
1987	Bangkok Knights	
1987	IK plus (International Karate plus)	
1987	Dragons Lair Part II	
1987	Star Paws	
1987	Delta	The title song borrows few bars of melody from the Koyaanisqatsi soundtrack by Philip Glass. Also inspired by Pink Floyd
1987	Trans Atlantic Balloon Challenge	
1987	Goldrunner	contains the same song as "Human Race"
1988	19 Part One: Boot Camp	an interpretation of Paul Hardcastle's "19"
1988	Jordan vs. Bird: One on One	
1988	Kings of the Beach	
1988	One-on-One 2	
1988	Power Play Hockey	
1988	Skate or Die!	
1988	Pandora	Based on the main theme from Dune
1988	Ricochet	
1989	688 Attack Sub	
1989	Budokan: The Martial Spirit	
1989	Indianapolis 500: The Simulation	
1989	Keef the Thief	
1989	Kings of the Beach	
1989	Lakers vs. Celtics and the NBA Playoffs	
1989	Populous	
1990	Low Blow	
1990	Ski or Die	
1990	The Immortal	
1990	John Madden Football	
1990	Skate or Die 2: The Search for Double Trouble	
1991	PGA Tour Golf	
1991	Road Rash	with Michael Bartlow
1991	Desert Strike: Return to the Gulf	with Brian L. Schmidt
1992	Road Rash 2	with Don Veca and Tony Berkeley
1992	The Lost Files of Sherlock Holmes: The Case of the Serrated Scalpel	
1992	John Madden Football '93	
1993	NHL '94	
1994	NHL '95	with Russell Lieblich
1996	The Lost Files of Sherlock Holmes: The Case of the Rose Tattoo	
2014	From Bedrooms to Billions	
2017	Rob's Life	
2018	Go Go Dash	
