= Luna Abyss =

2026 video game

- Developer: Kwalee Labs
- Publisher: Kwalee
- Engine: Unreal Engine
- Platforms: PlayStation 5; Windows; Xbox Series X/S
- Release: 21 May 2026
- Genres: Action-adventure, bullet hell, first-person shooter
- Mode: Single-player

Luna Abyss is a 2026 action-adventure first-person shooter video game developed by Kwalee Labs and published by Kwalee. It was released on 21 May 2026 for PlayStation 5, Windows and Xbox Series X/S.

== Gameplay ==
Luna Abyss is an action-adventure bullet hell first-person shooter set in an abandoned space prison on an alien moon. The player plays as Fawkes, a prisoner, and is tasked to explore the abyss, with every task the player completes knocking time off their prison sentence. Fawkes never does the exploring in person themselves, instead controlling and piloting biomechanical androids from the comfort of their cell under the watch of a mechanical head known as Aylin. The combat is built on a lock-on system, allowing the player to automatically aim at enemies.

== Development and release ==
In August 2022, Kwalee Labs (formerly Bonsai Collective) announced Luna Abyss and stated versions were in development for PlayStation 5, Windows and Xbox Series X/S. On 4 December 2025, it was announced the game would release in 2026. Luna Abyss launched on 21 May 2026 for all platforms. The game was made available as a day-one release on Xbox Game Pass.

In June 2026, just weeks after the game launched, Kwalee Labs CEO Hollie Emery said the entire development team had been laid off, but did not give a reason as to why.

== Reception ==
Reception

Aggregate scores
Aggregator	Score
Metacritic	(PC) 81/100 (PS5) 80/100
OpenCritic	81% recommend

Review scores
Publication	Score
Push Square	8/10
Gaming Bolt	7/10
PlayStation Universe	8.5/10

Luna Abyss received "generally favourable" reviews from critics, according to review aggregator site Metacritic. Fellow review aggregator OpenCritic assessed that the game received strong approval, being recommended by 81% of critics.

Push Square rated the game 8/10 and praised the "enticing and ominous" world as a "delight to look at artistically, even if its muddy graphics let it down on closer inspection." GamingBolt, rating the game 7/10, wrote: "Far from offering the best bullet hell or first-person shooter experience, Luna Abyss instead sticks to its own quirky formula, stubbornly so at times, and mostly succeeds." PlayStation Universe rated the game 8.5/10 and said despite being "held back slightly" by its combat readability issues and occasional visual softness, "Luna Abyss still delivers a highly engaging experience overall."
