= The Last V8 =

1985 video game

- Developer: David Darling
- Publisher: Mastertronic
- Programmer: David Darling
- Artist: James Wilson
- Composer: Rob Hubbard
- Platforms: Commodore 64 / 128, Atari 8-bit, Amstrad CPC
- Release: 1985
- Genre: Racing

The Last V8 is a racing game published by Mastertronic on their M.A.D. label. It was released in 1985 for the Commodore 64, Commodore 128, Atari 8-bit computers, and Amstrad CPC. The player controls a futuristic car in an uninhabited post-apocalyptic scenario. The title echoes a plot point from the Mad Max series of movies The design was done by Richard Darling and the programming by David Darling. The graphics are by Jim Wilson and music by Rob Hubbard.

== Plot ==
It is 2008 and the world has been devastated a few years earlier by a great nuclear war that left few survivors. The protagonist has survived for years in an underground military research bunker, where he has been working on the design of a special car, "the ultimate V8" to which the title refers. Based on an old car from the 1980s, it has a radiation shield, is computerised and remotely linked to the base, and can reach speeds of up to 410 km/h. The V8 has now been authorised to explore the surface in search of survivors to contact, but on his maiden run he has to quickly return to the safety of the bunker, because there are still nuclear warheads that explode periodically.

The Commodore 128 version changes the scenario a bit: the starting base is a colony on Mars, spared by the war, and the V8 is sent to Earth with the same mission of contacting survivors.

== Gameplay ==
Gameplay screenshot (Amstrad CPC)

The aim of the game is to guide the V8 to the bunker, avoiding crashing into obstacles or running out of fuel or the radiation shield, which starts to wear out after a certain amount of time when an explosive device goes off. The action always begins with an unclear digitised voice saying "V8, return to base immediately".

The screen is divided horizontally into two parts and in the top half the actual action takes place, with a top-down view and scrolling in all directions. The bottom half shows the dashboard with numerous indicators, including a small computer screen that indicates the distance to the base and warns of the rise of radiation.

If the player hits any of the obstacles, the V8 is destroyed, and they have to start the level all over again.

== Commodore 128 version ==
The Last V8 is one of the few commercial games to run in native mode on the Commodore 128. The 128 version has more levels (three instead of only two levels). The first level, the one missing in the 64 version, has more complex mission objectives.

== Reception ==
The Last V8 received a mixed response. While the graphics and music were praised, the controls were difficult and the game was considered unplayable by some reviewers. Despite this, the game still reached number 5 in the video game charts.
