= Flash Gordon (1986 video game) =

1986 video game

- Developer: Mastertronic
- Publisher: Mastertronic
- Composer: Rob Hubbard
- Platforms: Amstrad CPC, Commodore 64, ZX Spectrum, MSX
- Release: 1986
- Genre: Action
- Mode: Single-player

Flash Gordon is a video game based on a comic strip character of the same name. The game was published in 1986 by Mastertronic for the Commodore 64 and was subsequently ported to the Amstrad CPC, ZX Spectrum, and MSX personal computers.

It features three individual levels. The first is set on the jungle world of Arboria in which Flash Gordon has to traverse through the jungle like maze to escape. The second level is a beat'em up style game in which Flash fights Prince Barin. The final level is a 3D style shooter which has Flash flying a rocket cycle in pursuit of Ming the Merciless.

== Reception ==
Zzap!64 praised the Commodore 64 version of the game. Reviewers appreciated the gameplay variety offered by the three different sections of the game, and the quality of graphics and sound. It was rated 89% overall.
