= Sprawl Zero =

2026 video game

SPRAWL zero
- Developer: MAETH
- Publisher: Kwalee
- Composer: Carlos Lizarraga
- Engine: Unreal Engine 5
- Platforms: Nintendo Switch 2; PlayStation 5; Windows; Xbox Series X and S
- Release: WW: September 8, 2026
- Genre: First-person shooter
- Mode: Single-player

Sprawl Zero (stylized as SPRAWL zero) is a retro first-person shooter video game developed by MAETH and published by Kwalee for Microsoft Windows, Xbox Series X and S, PlayStation 5, and Nintendo Switch 2 on September 8, 2026. It is a prequel to MAETH's 2023 game Sprawl. Set within a dystopian and bleak urban sprawl, players control a cybernetic super soldier aligned with the reigning faction, whose mission is to fight against a rebellious cult.

It has been described and marketed as inspired by PlayStation 2-era shooters. It received positive reception and was compared favorably to F.E.A.R., Black, and Half-Life 2.

== Gameplay ==
The game contains 11 levels; they begin with a "mission debriefing" in which the player's objectives and plan of action are laid out. Sprawl Zero's controls are similar to other mid-2000s shooter games. In particular, the player can punch, grab, shoot, sprint, jump, slide, and dive. One weapon at a time may be held, but weapons cannot be reloaded; once its ammunition or equivalent is depleted, a new weapon must be picked up. If no gun is carried, the player can fight with their Gravity Gloves, a pair of powerful gravity-controlling gloves. Weapons are categorized by their type (e.g. pistol, shotgun, rocket launcher) and an ascending tier, ranging from 1 to 5; higher tier weapons are more powerful but rarer. There are over 40 weapons.

The game features a simple physics system, enabled via the Gravity Gloves. Weapons and other objects can be picked up from relatively long distances and some objects may be thrown at enemies to deal damage. The player can also "grab" missiles and grenades mid-air to use them against opponents.

The player character also has many special abilities at their disposal, most of which deplete "adrenaline" and last a short time. Adrenaline is replenished passively or through killing enemies with an ability. Gravity Shield blocks incoming bullets and reflects them back if enough are caught. Bullet-Time slows down time and guides shots towards enemies. Rushdown grants invulnerability and empowers the Gravity Gloves, boosting damage and enabling them to be used quickly. Near the game's end, a final ability is gained that allows them to grab and throw small enemies as objects.

== Plot ==
As a prequel, the game is set in the universe of the previous game, SPRAWL. In a dense urban sprawl wracked by endless wars and power struggles, two central factions emerge: the authoritarian and technocratic Junta, and the rebellious and religious Imago-Dei. Players control Five, a cyborg soldier aligned with the Junta and commanded by Laeta, whose mission is to wipe out the weakened Imago-Dei and eliminate its leader, Silas, establishing total control of the Sprawl for them.

The Imago-Dei later acquire a nuclear bomb, which Five is instructed to recover the arming keys for from the figurehead priests, and then disarm it. Upon finding each key, the priests plead with Five, explaining the nuclear bomb is not an offensive tactic, but rather a deterrent against the Junta. When Five returns with the keys, Laeta changes the mission objective and now instructs Five to detonate the bomb in the city instead. Before he can do so, Silas appears and arms the bomb himself, leaving Five to die in the explosion.

Instead of perishing, Five finds himself in an ethereal, limbo-esque world before he reawakens back in the Sprawl, weak and with his cybernetic powers removed. Upon Five's return to a Junta base, Laeta is shocked by his return. Laeta then intends to deceive Five through a diagnostic and then kill him, but is stopped by a mysterious figure known as Father. Five is guided by Father and told to "cleanse his indoctrination", beseeched to turn against the Junta.

Father explains that Silas is Subject Zero, a once charismatic and conquering leader who was captured by the Junta. Instead of killing him, they experimented on him and created a line of genetic copies called REAPERs, each with different traits amplified for specific tasks; however, not every copy was stable – only the descendants Five and Six were.

Deep beneath the Sprawl lies the Undercity, an ancient and desolate concrete landscape. The Undercity was previously the first incarnation of the city, but first attempts at artificial intelligence were catastrophic and accidentally created the Hive Mind, a body-horror amalgamation of millions of discarded corpses called the Condemned. With the entire metropolis uninhabitable and dangerous, it was sealed and the Sprawl was built atop it, containing the threat. Following the isolation, the fight for control of the Sprawl began in earnest, yielding the inception of Father, the Junta, and Silas.

Since his experimentation, Silas has freed himself and leads the indoctrinated Imago-Dei against the Junta. However, he is now a zealot and holds violent millenarian views; Silas secretly intends to unleash the Hive Mind upon the Sprawl, thereby annihilating the world entirely and starting fresh. Father sees his new ambitions as misguided and disastrous, urging Five to confront and stop Silas. Descending into the Undercity, Five fights the Condemned before facing Silas, who is powering and trying to awaken the Hive Mind. In battle, Five defeats Silas and then hovers him over a bottomless pit before crushing his skull and dropping him.

In the credits sequence, Five returns to the Sprawl and is saluted by Imago-Dei cultists. He ascends an apartment complex, and walks in on a cloaked Junta assassin about to kill Seven, the protagonist of Sprawl. Five kills the assassin and saves Seven, and says to her that "we're even" before leaping out of the building.

== Reception ==
Reception

Aggregate scores
Aggregator	Score
Metacritic	76/100
OpenCritic	71% recommend

Review scores
Publication	Score
Push Square	7/10
CGMagazine	8/10
Gamer Social Club	8/10
PlayStation Universe	8/10
TechRaptor	8.5/10

Reviews of the game were positive, with some criticism directed at its story and level design. It received "generally favorable reviews" on the review aggregator site Metacritic, scoring a 76/100 based on 10 critic reviews. On OpenCritic, it scored "71% Critics Recommend" with 21 reviews.

Several reviewers focused on the game's weapon system. Zack Zwiezen of Kotaku wrote that the constant switching made each encounter more dynamic and tense, and that the combat and abilities differentiated it from the early-2000s shooters it is based on. Brendan Caldwell of Jank compared the design to the two-weapon limit in Halo: Combat Evolved and commended the decision. Aaron Bayne of Push Square found the weapon-swapping loop satisfying, and Zubi Khan of CGMagazine likewise described the cycle of taking enemies' weapons as addictive. In a review for Games Asylum, Matt Gander credited the Gravity Gloves as giving the game fresher ideas than a simple retread of older shooters, but wrote that the player's power could leave them feeling more like a passenger than a participant in the early hours.

Reviewers gave differing opinions of the game's presentation and level design. Checkpoint's June Waterhouse praised its sound design and art direction, and Horror Geek Life's Sean Shuman also praised its scoring and visuals. Zwiezen described the brown, beige and grey palette as a faithful evocation of PS2-era shooters, whereas Gander wrote that the predominantly beige and brown environments work against the game, making stages and characters hard to distinguish. Khan found the grey urban settings unappealing – he opined that early levels were brought down by repeated backtracking. Gander wrote that a larger enemy roster later in the game added variety. Bayne noted generic or "copy-and-paste" environments as well as backtracking, but also wrote that the game's length kept these issues acceptable. Waterhouse cited difficulty spikes and levels that, although linear, were difficult to navigate.

The story was received more negatively, with it being described as unengaging or vague. Waterhouse described it as unclear and wrote that the protagonist's character arc failed to emotionally hook her; Gander found it difficult to follow because some information is delivered during combat. TechRaptor's Austin Suther called the story "a bit obtuse"; however, Gamer Social Club's Mark Pell said it was better than expected.

Two reviewers compared the game to its predecessor, Sprawl. Khan, who said he was a fan of the original, described Zero as more combat-focused while the first game was more movement-based. Shuman considered it better than its predecessor, seeing it as having more of its own identity.
