= Tir Na Nog (video game) =

1984 video game

- Developers: Greg Follis, Roy Carter
- Publisher: Gargoyle Games
- Platforms: ZX Spectrum, Amstrad CPC, Commodore 64
- Release: 1984: Spectrum, Amstrad CPC; 1984: Commodore 64
- Mode: Single-player

Tir Na Nog is a video game that was published in 1984 by Gargoyle Games for the ZX Spectrum and Amstrad CPC. A Commodore 64 version was released in 1985. It is loosely based on Celtic mythology. Tir Na Nog was positively reviewed by critics. A prequel - Dun Darach - was published a year later.

== Plot ==
Tir Na nÓg, Irish for "Land of Youth", is the location for the game. The protagonist, Cuchulainn, has departed the land of the living and finds himself at an altar in this land, essentially an afterlife. His goal is to reunite the four fragments of the Seal of Calum and place it on the altar, all while avoiding the sídhe.

== Gameplay ==
Gameplay takes the form of an arcade-adventure with the player controlling the hero as he wanders the land of Tir Na Nog collecting objects, solving puzzles and trying to keep out of the way of the sídhe who also wander the land. Many of the puzzles that Cuchulainn is set are cryptic in nature (e.g. "The backdoor key is me") rather than straightforward and may rely on some lateral thinking.

Because he is in an afterlife, Cuchulainn cannot die and if he is "defeated" by a sídhe he is simply transported elsewhere and loses all his carried objects.

The Land of Tir Na Nog is large and consists of plains, caverns and forests. Cuchulainn can move north, south, east and west with the player "rotating" the view using the keyboard and then having Cuchulainn move left or right on the screen. The player can collect any objects they come across with Cuchulainn being able to carry several at one time. Some of these objects can be used as weapons: the game allows the player to "thrust" with any item.

== Reception ==
Reception

Review scores
Publication	Score
Crash	92%
Sinclair User	9/10
Personal Computer Games	9/10
Sinclair Programs	87%
Your Computer	4/5
Computer Gamer	4/5
Zzap!64	87%

The game was well received. Zzap!64 called it "a REAL arcade adventure. The graphics are stunning and the scenery excellent", noting the multiple puzzle solutions and large game world.

== Legacy ==
Psygnosis planned to release a remake of the game for IBM PC compatibles, helmed by the game's original creators Greg Follis and Roy Carter, in June 1995. Near completion, the project was cancelled.
