= Crazy Comets =

1985 video game

- Publishers: Martech; Ricochet
- Programmer: Simon Nicol
- Composer: Rob Hubbard
- Platform: Commodore 64
- Release: 1985
- Genre: Multidirectional shooter

Crazy Comets is a multidirectional shooter programmed by Simon Nicol for the Commodore 64 and published by Martech in 1985. The game is a clone of Gottlieb's 1983 Mad Planets arcade video game, even using the same logo treatment with "Crazy" and "Comets" replacing "Mad" and "Planets" respectively. The two music tracks and the sound effects were produced by Rob Hubbard. Crazy Comets was followed by a 1987 sequel, also programmed by Nicol, Mega Apocalypse.

== Reception ==
Zzap!64 praised the game for being an uncomplicated example of the genre. Happy Computer said the music alone was worth the price of admission.
