= I, Ball =

1987 video game

- Developer: Timothy Closs
- Publisher: Firebird Software
- Designer: Timothy Closs
- Composer: Rob Hubbard
- Platforms: Amstrad CPC, Atari ST, Commodore 64, ZX Spectrum
- Release: May 1987
- Genre: Scrolling shooter
- Mode: Single-player

ZX Spectrum version

I, Ball is a vertically scrolling shooter published for the Amstrad CPC, Atari ST, Commodore 64 and ZX Spectrum in 1987 by Firebird. It was programmed by Timothy Closs. The C64 version features music written by Rob Hubbard, based on two tunes by Cabaret Voltaire called "Whip Blow" and "I Want You". Hubbard was commissioned to write music based on the style of the band. The audio also includes synthesised speech.

It was followed by a sequel, I, Ball 2, released later the same year.

== Reception ==
Reviews were largely positive, with CRASH magazine awarding the Spectrum version of the game 90% and describing it as "a great little game with plenty of lasting appeal". Zzap64 awarded the C64 version 80%, calling it "unusual and competent"
