= Mega Apocalypse =

1987 video game

- Publisher: Martech
- Programmer: Simon Nicol
- Artist: Bob Stevenson
- Composer: Rob Hubbard
- Platforms: Commodore 64, BBC Micro, Amstrad CPC, ZX Spectrum
- Release: 1987
- Genre: Multidirectional shooter
- Modes: Single-player, multiplayer

Mega Apocalypse is a microcomputer video game in the genre multidirectional shooter, written by Simon Nicol for the Commodore 64 and ported to the BBC Micro, Amstrad CPC, and ZX Spectrum. It is the sequel to Crazy Comets. Both games are clones of Gottlieb's 1983 arcade video game Mad Planets; Mega-Apocalypse adds two players simultaneous multiplayer. The music is by Rob Hubbard.
