= Sanxion =

1986 video game

- C64 cover art
- Developer: Thalamus
- Publisher: Thalamus
- Designer: Stavros Fasoulas
- Composer: Rob Hubbard
- Platforms: Commodore 64, ZX Spectrum
- Release: 1986: C64; 1989: Spectrum
- Genre: Scrolling shooter
- Mode: Single-player

Sanxion is a horizontally scrolling shooter developed by Stavros Fasoulas for the Commodore 64 and published in 1986 by Thalamus Ltd. It was the first game released by Thalamus. A ZX Spectrum port followed in 1989. Fasoulas also wrote Delta and Quedex.

== Gameplay ==
Sanxion is a horizontally scrolling shooter. The goal to traverse each level from left to right avoiding or destroying any enemies and obstacles. The scrolling speed is controllable, increasing the closer the player is to the center of the screen. The screen is divided in two sections, the upper one with an overhead view, and the lower one, taking up two-thirds of the screen, shows a typical side view. Enemies can come from both sides of the screen in close formations that the player must avoid colliding with.

While the scrolling is automatic for the most part, the player can control the speed of the engines (there is even a bonus timer that counts down, as an incentive for those who want to "blast through"), and the pitch of the noise alters accordingly, while sounding vaguely like a didgeridoo. This "adjustable rate autoscroll" is uncommon in the genre (Armed Police Unit Gallop is another example of this). There are a few exceptions, though. Several levels end with sections where the ship is forced to fly at maximum speed (a two-note siren will sound at the beginning of such sections), where the player must be quick to avoid oncoming barriers.

There are two main types of levels in Sanxion, based on the enemies. In some, such as the first, the enemies are constant throughout the level. In some others, such as the second, reaching a certain point (usually change of terrain) will cause all enemies on screen to self-destruct, and a different type of enemy will appear. There are exceptions to these patterns.

At the end of each level, there are non-lethal bonus stages which award points to the player for shooting, crashing or avoiding floating letters (the action required depends on the actual letter) at great speed. The background in these stages is a rainbow, and the "radar" does not show your ship.

== Ports ==
=== ZX Spectrum ===
Sanxion was ported externally to the ZX Spectrum by Softstorm Developments and published in 1989 with the subtitle the Spectrum Remix in both 48k and 128k versions. This port has noticeable gameplay differences, e.g. the scrolling speed is fixed. The music score features renditions of the two main themes arranged by Wally Beben.

=== Game Boy Advance ===
A port was planned by Thalamus Interactive in 2001 for the Game Boy Advance, with updated graphics and new features, like two-player mode and end-of-level bosses. A prototype without a split screen was developed, but the game was perceived too financially risky and ultimately canceled.

== Development ==
Sanxion was the first Thalamus game to use the Cyberload loader by John Twiddy, famous for containing the string "hackers screw off and die". Computer Gaming World noted the presence of the fastloader (although not the string present) and was thankful for its inclusion.

=== Music ===
The SID music by Rob Hubbard called "Thalamusik" was played in the Commodore 64 tape loading screen, during several minutes of slow tape load. The piece was inspired by Zoolook by Jean Michel Jarre, a piece that Hubbard also reproduced in SID form for some public domain demos. It was popular and later spawned several fan-made remixes.

The menu plays a SID version of Sergei Prokofiev's "Dance of the Knights" piece from the ballet Romeo and Juliet.

== Reception ==
The game was reviewed in 1988 in Dragon #130 by Hartley, Patricia, and Kirk Lesser in "The Role of Computers" column. The reviewers gave the game 4 out of 5 stars.

Commodore User's Mike Pattenden considered the game to be a clone of Uridium which was well executed but not really worth purchasing as an alternative to the cheaper rival Warhawk.

It was voted Best Soundtrack of the Year at the Golden Joystick Awards.

In a retrospective review Kristan Reed of Eurogamer gave the game a 7/10 rating: "Although Sanxion doesn't stand up nearly as well as Uridium does these days, it was still a real highlight of the C64's growing love-affair with shooters. If you're a twitch shooter junkie, this is a game you have to play at some stage".
