= American Fugitive =

2019 video game

- Developer: Fallen Tree Games
- Publisher: Curve Games
- Platforms: PlayStation 4; Windows; Nintendo Switch; Xbox One
- Release: WW: May 21, 2019 (PS4, PC); WW: May 23, 2019 (NS); WW: May 24, 2019 (XB1)
- Genre: Action-adventure
- Mode: Single-player

American Fugitive is a 2019 action-adventure video game developed by Fallen Tree Games and published by Curve Games. It is a Grand Theft Auto clone, though it mimics the earlier entries, which had a top-down perspective.

Set in the 1980s in the fictional Southern American town of Redrock County, the single-player story follows protagonist Will Riley as he seeks answers about the murder of his father, which Riley was falsely accused of.

Outside of game missions, players can freely navigate the world either on foot, by swimming, by vehicle or by train.

== Gameplay ==
The game is set in the 1980s, and you play as the protagonist, Will Riley, who was falsely convicted for his father's murder. Riley escapes from jail and seeks answers about his father's murder in the fictional Southern town Redrock County. Players can complete jobs for underworld crime bosses to learn more about the murder of Riley's father or engage in crimes in the open world environment. Committing crimes raises Riley's infamy and draws more police. Breaking into houses and businesses allows the player to find useful items, such as weapons, but alerts the police to Riley's location.

The game features a home invasion system, where players can look through windows to determine whether anyone is home, before breaking in and searching for valuables under a time pressure. If the player comes across a person in the house, they can flee, or restrain them. Doing so alerts the police to Riley's location.

There are a number of vehicles available for player use, including tow trucks and tanks. Time trials and ramps can be found across the map, which reward the player with money and points which can be used on the games skill tree.

Dying during a story mission returns the character to the last checkpoint of that particular mission. Dying or being arrested in the open world will result in a player respawning with all story progress retained. Players have the option of whether or not their inventory is retained following death in the open world.

American Fugitive is a modern take on sandbox games.

== Development ==
The developers created a video game where the protagonist is on the run because they had not seen many of those recently. Various films and television shows from the 1980s and 1990s inspired them, including A Perfect World, The Fugitive, The A-Team, and The Dukes of Hazzard. American Fugitive was released for the PC and PlayStation 4 on May 21; the Nintendo Switch on May 23; and the Xbox One on May 24, 2019.

== Reception ==
American Fugitive received "mixed or average" reviews on Metacritic across all platforms. The Guardian criticized the writing and atmosphere but said that it "successfully pays homage to a fondly remembered old game while adding something meaningful". Push Square and Nintendo Life praised the open world elements while criticizing the other gameplay. Push Square said the mission design consists of tedious and repetitive fetch quests, and Nintendo Life likened the gameplay to "death by a thousand cuts" because of a multitude of small, questionable design decisions.

== See also ==
- The Precinct- Game with a police protagonist also developed by Fallen Tree Games
