= The Precinct (video game) =

2025 action-adventure game

- Developer: Fallen Tree Games
- Publisher: Kwalee
- Director: Joe Moulding
- Producer: Chris Dawson
- Designer: Ben Shoesmith
- Programmer: Harrison Went
- Artist: Lewis Boadle
- Writers: Scott Alexander; Jack Richardson
- Composers: Gavin Harrison; Jonny Adams
- Engine: Unity
- Platforms: PlayStation 5; Windows; Xbox Series X/S
- Release: May 13, 2025
- Genres: Action-adventure, simulator
- Mode: Single-player

The Precinct is a 2025 action-adventure simulator video game developed by Fallen Tree Games and published by Kwalee for Windows, PlayStation 5, and Xbox Series X/S. Set in the fictional crime-ridden Averno City in 1983, it follows Nick Cordell Jr., a rookie police officer who joins the troubled Averno City Police Department (ACPD) to follow his late father's footsteps. The Precinct was released on May 13, 2025.

== Gameplay ==
A gameplay screenshot of Cordell and Kelly pursuing a fleeing suspect, supported by three backup units and a helicopter

The Precinct is set in the open world of Averno City, an undistinguished 1980s East Coast city suffering from urban decay and a severe crime wave akin to that experienced by New York City, its primary inspiration, in the same era. Like Fallen Tree Games' previous project, American Fugitive (which is set in the same fictional universe), The Precinct is a Grand Theft Auto clone, except the protagonist and player character of The Precinct is a police officer, Nick Cordell Jr., supported by his computer-controlled partner Leo Kelly. Gameplay is presented from a top-down perspective in which the player directly controls Cordell.

The Precinct is a law enforcement simulator similar to the Police Quest series, Police Simulator: Patrol Officers, and LCPDFR and LSPDFR, combining mundane police work such as traffic policing and parking enforcement with action events like car chases and shootouts inspired by 1980s films. Players have access to a variety of police cars and a police helicopter, as well as unmarked and commandeered civilian vehicles (only with a certain skill tree perk). Equipment includes a variety of firearms, less-lethal weapons, and tools, which can be swapped and restocked at the precinct's armory or police car trunks. Vehicles, equipment, and customization options are unlocked by ranking up through experience, gained from proper duty performance.

Gameplay is divided into "shifts", each ranging between six to twelve in-game hours (equivalent to real-life minutes), further divided by beat location, type of patrol (foot patrol, vehicle patrol, or helicopter patrol), and assignment (regular patrol or a focused crackdown on specific infractions, such as gang activity or quality of life crime). During a shift, the player must patrol within their assigned beat to handle crimes they witness or callouts sent by dispatch, ranging from vandalism and drunk driving to carjackings and robberies. During a callout, the player must respond to the scene and handle the situation appropriately based on the procedures detailed within an in-game handbook and a simplified use of force continuum, including the circumstances under which suspects should be frisked or given a breathalyzer test, if force should be used against them, or what charges should be filed (and whether they should be ticketed or arrested) based on their actions, though parts of this can be skipped by having Kelly or other officers do it instead, or toggled to be performed automatically. During callouts, the player can call for police reinforcements using "Support Tokens" that are gained by remaining in close vicinity of the suspects in pursuits or killing or arresting a suspect in shootouts, with backup options including a patrol car, a nearby foot patrol officer, a police helicopter, tactical officers, or for spike strips or a roadblock to be set up ahead. To make a suspect surrender, their "compliance meter" must be depleted by shouting orders, applying less-lethal "restraining force" such as tackling them, or remaining in close pursuit. If lethal force is authorized on a suspect, they can still be coerced to surrender, but are allowed to be killed. When a suspect is arrested, they must be transported back to the precinct and booked at the front desk, either by Cordell and Kelly themselves or by a prisoner transport unit if one is called to take the suspect.

The game's plot is progressed through a series of special shift-long story callouts in the tutorial and in the climax of the plot. In standard freeroam, the plot and subplots are directly progressed through some cutscenes and story-related callouts, as well as indirectly by collecting gang-related evidence from suspects to gather more information on gang leaders. When enough evidence is collected to pursue a gang leader, a special story callout akin to the tutorial is made available that centers around pursuing and apprehending the target.

== Plot ==
In 1983, Averno City suffers from a severe crime wave and decline driven by the growing influence of organized crime and fueled by the institutional weakening of the Averno City Police Department (ACPD). Nick Cordell Jr., the son of late Police Chief Nick Cordell Sr. who was killed in 1978, joins the ACPD as a rookie under the command of Chief Rick Jackson and Watch Commander Leslie Kowalski, who assign Sergeant Leo Kelly, a close friend of Cordell Sr. nearing retirement, to be his field training officer and partner.

On his first shift, Cordell and Kelly stop a bank robbery committed by the August Gang, a powerful arms trafficking ring with considerable influence over Averno City. Cordell, Kelly, and informant Antonio Gambit aid Chief Jackson and Detectives Li and Ferrera in dismantling the August Gang, arresting their leader, who is suspiciously killed in jail. The defeat of the August Gang creates a power vacuum that two rival gangs—the Crimson Serpents, a "diversified" Chinese triad, and the Jawheads, a counterculture revolutionary cell using a punk rock band as a front—attempt to fill. Cordell and Kelly assist Li and Ferrera with their investigations into the gangs, additionally aiding Ferrera with investigating a series of targeted murders by a vigilante, while conducting their regular patrol duties.

After apprehending the leaders of both gangs, the precinct hosts Kelly's retirement party. Cordell is alerted to a misplaced letter from his father and searches the chief's office, where he finds a police report on his father's murder that suggests he knew his killer. However, Jackson arrives and absconds him for insubordination. Reassigned to parking duty, Cordell and Kelly surveil Jackson and learn he and Antonio are secretly working together, but Cordell is captured while investigating. Antonio reveals he is the true leader of the August Gang, that he was using the ACPD to get rid of his competition, and that both Jackson and Cordell Sr. were corrupt, before Kelly arrives and rescues Cordell. While battling the August Gang during a gold robbery, Cordell and Kelly learn Jackson has been captured by Antonio and rush to intervene, killing Antonio in a shootout and rescuing Jackson.

Jackson reveals that he and Cordell Sr. only cooperated with the August Gang to secure much-needed police equipment which the city was reluctant to provide. However, after the August Gang killed a young rookie, Cordell Sr. was haunted by the prospect that his son could meet a similar fate and decided he would expose the August Gang; Jackson reluctantly alerted Antonio, who killed Cordell Sr. against Jackson's expectations. Feeling deep remorse for his actions, Jackson directs Cordell to search his office for a file containing all evidence of the corruption scheme, and entrusts him to decide what to do with it. The player can then choose to either allow the news to publish the file or burn it at Cordell Sr.'s memorial. If the evidence is published, Jackson is replaced by Chief Yasmin Singh and Cordell Sr.'s memorial is removed. If the evidence is burned, Jackson commits himself to making amends and promises Cordell promotions for his work. Regardless, Kelly decides not to retire, while Cordell returns to his duties.

== Development and release ==
The Precinct was inspired by early top-down Grand Theft Auto titles such as the original Grand Theft Auto and Grand Theft Auto 2, as well as the Grand Theft Auto V mod LSPDFR. Also cited as inspirations were police procedurals and neo-noir productions from the 1970s and 1980s such as The French Connection, Taxi Driver, and Hill Street Blues. The 1983 setting was chosen to capitalize on 1980s nostalgia and as an artistic choice to work with the limitations of policing a pre-digital society. Using experience and feedback from American Fugitive, Fallen Tree Games sought to prioritize free roam gameplay and high replay value with a "Crime Generation System" for randomized procedurally-generated callouts, to encourage players to continue to play the game after completing the main story.

Development was headed primarily by a team of five developers from Fallen Tree Games: two artists, two programmers, and a designer. External development assistance was provided for work such as voice acting and art. Kevin Cox, a retired New York City Police Department officer who worked in the 1980s, served as a technical advisor. The game's synthwave soundtrack was composed and produced by Gavin Harrison and Sleepless-Nights.

Originally slated for an August 15, 2024 release, The Precinct was delayed to a fall 2024 release due to time constraints. As part of Steam's October 2024 Next Fest, a demo was released on October 14. It was again pushed back to a proposed 2025 release date. The game was released on May 13, 2025.

== Reception ==
Reception

Aggregate scores
Aggregator	Score
Metacritic	(PC) 66/100 (PS5) 66/100 (XSXS) 75/100
OpenCritic	49% recommend

Review scores
Publication	Score
IGN	7/10
PCGamesN	4/10
Push Square	8/10

The Precinct received "mixed or average" reviews for the Windows and PlayStation 5 versions while the Xbox Series X/S version received "generally favorable" reviews, according to review aggregator Metacritic. OpenCritic determined that 57% of critics recommended the game. IGN praised its varied gameplay and realism, but criticized its repetitiveness. Push Square called the game an "impressive sandbox romp" which is "fueled by a dynamic crime system that offers up hours of fun". However, PCGamesN gave a negative review stating the game is a "deeply repetitive open-world police simulator".

== See also ==
- This Is the Police
