= Don't Stop, Girlypop! =

2026 video game

- Developer: Funny Fintan Softworks
- Publisher: Kwalee Gaming
- Composers: Sarah Wolfe; XD Project; Candice Susnjar
- Platform: Windows
- Release: 29 January 2026
- Genre: First-person shooter
- Mode: Single-player

Don't Stop, Girlypop! (previously titled Incolatus and then Incolatus: Don't Stop, Girlypop!) is a first-person shooter developed by Australian studio Funny Fintan Softworks. It was announced on 24 February 2024 and was released on 29 January 2026. The game is described as "a Y2K girly pop boomershooter game featuring trans characters in a hyperpop gaming experience".

== Gameplay ==
Don't Stop, Girlypop is a 3D fast-paced arcade and retro-style movement shooter with tonal and stylistic elements heavily inspired by Y2K aestheticism and pop culture surrounding the turn of the millennium; particular inspirations include flip phones, Bratz, Doodle Bears and Ultrakill. The game's systems and overall gameplay can be compared to earlier titles, such as Ultrakill and Doom Eternal.

Don't Stop, Girlypop! places heavy emphasis on movement and stylish techniques to kill the game's various enemies. The player navigates several enemy filled arenas, armed with a variety of weapons each with alternative firing modes. Players are incentivized to use movement techniques to kill enemies in fast and stylistic fashion, with the more speed the player gains influencing their overall damage output. The player can also obtain a substance called "love" from the corpses of fallen enemies, allowing them to regenerate a small portion of their depleted health. The player is also able to customize their weapons and arms through an in-game menu.

== Plot ==
The player takes the role of an unnamed revolutionary environmental activist combating a mining corporation known as Tigris Nix; the company pollutes the environment through their draining of a substance called "The Love". In protest, the player travels through various Tigris Nix facilities, destroying the robotic security drones throughout and draining them of their love.

== Reception ==
Reception

Aggregate scores
Aggregator	Score
Metacritic	69/100
OpenCritic	38% recommend

Review scores
Publication	Score
The A.V. Club	C+
Shacknews	7/10
Checkpoint Gaming	8/10
TheGamer	4/5

Don't Stop, Girlypop! received "mixed or average" reviews from critics, according to the review aggregation website Metacritic. Fellow review aggregator OpenCritic assessed that the game received fair approval, being recommended by 38% of critics. Reviewing the game for Shacknews, Lucas White praised the aesthetic, gameplay, and customization while criticizing "some janky mechanics" and "wooden voice-acting".
