= Action Biker =

1985 video game

- Developer: Mastertronic
- Publisher: Mastertronic
- Composer: Rob Hubbard
- Platforms: Atari 8-bit, Commodore 64, ZX Spectrum
- Release: 1985
- Genre: Action
- Mode: Single-player

Action Biker (also known as KP Skips Action Biker with Clumsy Colin in the UK) is a 1985 game for Atari 8-bit computers, Commodore 64, and ZX Spectrum released by Mastertronic. The game was a tie-in with snack food KP Skips, whose mascot was "Clumsy Colin" who featured in television adverts for Skips at around the time the game was published. The music was composed by Rob Hubbard.

Although marketed under the same title, the ZX Spectrum version of Action Biker differs significantly from the Atari and C64 versions, to the extent that Retro Gamer magazine featured it in their "Same Name, Different Game" column.

== Gameplay ==
The isometric view seen in the C64 version.

The player controls the protagonist Clumsy Colin who rides a motorbike and has to navigate a landscape to extra equipment to improve the bike. Once all forty pieces are collected the player performs a final drag race. There is a time limit, and the player also has a limited number of lives reduced by crashing into background objects.

The Atari and Commodore 64 versions feature an isometric view of the town, which wraps around at the edges. The Spectrum version has a different viewpoint.

There are several key areas to the map: the petrol station (where the player can refuel), the lakes (including an island that is initially inaccessible), the rollercoaster (which can be ridden on the C64 and Atari versions) and the building site (which changes shape as the game progresses).

Among the extras collected are a new gearbox (allowing the player to switch to low gear for higher acceleration), water-skis or a snorkel (to allow the player to cross water) and a larger fuel tank.

=== Spectrum version ===
ZX Spectrum screenshot

Although the ZX Spectrum version shares the basic gameplay elements of navigating a motorbike around a scrolling city and collecting objects with the Atari and C64 versions, it is otherwise significantly different in both plot and execution.

The aim of this version, according to the instructions is to "find [Colin's] friend Marti and take him to the spaceport". Items helping him do this can be found inside houses around the city. However "the alarm is set to go off at 8 o'clock and wake him up", and Colin will also "wake up" if he collides with other vehicles. While it may be implied that the game- including the otherwise incongruous "spaceport" reference- takes place within Colin's dream, the instructions do not explicitly state this. Further, actually picking up Martin in the game gives a message that he should be taken to the "airport", not the spaceport.

In addition, Colin's bike has limited fuel, but "he can gain energy by eating Skips or by refueling at a garage."

== Reception ==
The Commodore 64 version was positively reviewed by Zzap!64 who thought it was one of the best Mastertronic titles to date and excellent value for money. It was given an 83% overall score.

The ZX Spectrum version received generally poor reviews. A contemporary Sinclair User review commented that "why Colin is asleep is a mystery."
