= Mad Planets =

1983 video game

- Developer: Gottlieb
- Publisher: Gottlieb
- Programmer: Kan Yabumoto
- Artist: Jeff Lee
- Composer: David D. Thiel
- Platform: Arcade
- Release: NA: February 1983
- Genre: Multidirectional shooter
- Modes: Single-player, multiplayer
- Arcade system: GG-III

Mad Planets is a multidirectional shooter released as an arcade video game in 1983 by Gottlieb. The player controls a spaceship, which can be moved and rotated independently, to fend off angry planets and moons attacking from all sides. It was designed and programmed by Kan Yabumoto with art by Jeff Lee and sound by David D. Thiel. Lee and Thiel previously worked on Q*bert for Gottlieb, a game that was inspired by a pattern of hexagons implemented by Yabumoto. Kan Yabumoto died in 2017 of a degenerative lung disease.

== Gameplay ==
Fighting three planets with moons while an astronaut floats by

The player uses a flight-style joystick to move a spaceship around a dark starfield, a rotary knob to orient the ship, and a trigger on the stick to fire. At the beginning of a level, planets appear and begin growing. They can be destroyed prior to reaching full size and sprouting moons. If a wave is completed by destroying all planets before they reach full size, a substantial bonus is awarded. Once a planet has moons, it is shielded until all its moons have been destroyed or launched at the player's ship, at which point the planet becomes enraged and charges the player.

Erratically moving astronauts can be collected by flying over them. They also appear in bonus rounds after every third level (every fourth after level twelve). Orbiting comets accelerate the longer they go without being shot. In a bonus round, comets increase in value by 100 points, to a maximum of 1000, until a comet leaves the screen or the level ends.

== Reception ==
Writing for Creative Computing Video & Arcade Games, Steve Arrants chose Mad Planets as one of the top ten games of the 1983 American Amusement Operators Expo. He praised the "beautiful graphics", "extremely responsive" controls, and concluded "I would rank Mad Planets right up there with other high-tension favorites such as Robotron and Tempest."

In a 1983 review for Video Games, John Holmstrom wrote: "it's the frenetic game play and rock-oriented soundtrack that make Mad Planets worth playing." He found the player's ship to be overly large for the screen, and the lack of new elements in later levels reduced his interest in sticking with the game.

== Legacy ==
Programmer Simon Nicol wrote two clones for the Commodore 64 published by Martech: Crazy Comets and its sequel Mega Apocalypse.
