= Moley Christmas =

1987 video game

- Developers: Shaun Hollingworth; Peter Harrap; Chris Kerry
- Publisher: Gremlin Graphics/Your Sinclair
- Platform: ZX Spectrum
- Release: 1987
- Genre: Platform
- Mode: Single-player

Moley Christmas is a platform game released in 1987 for the ZX Spectrum. It was available exclusively as a covermount cassette for Your Sinclair magazine. Moley Christmas is the fifth game in the Monty Mole series and a sequel to the 1987 video game Auf Wiedersehen Monty.

== Gameplay ==
The Gremlin Graphics offices as represented in the game.

Moley Christmas featured similar gameplay to the previous game in the series, Auf Wiedersehen Monty. The player guides Monty around various screens, jumping, climbing, dodging enemies, and collecting items. There are six screens to navigate to bring the game from the programmers to the magazine's readers.

Screen #	Location	Activity
1	The Gremlin Graphics office	The player must collect the source code to the game and escape to screen 2.
2	The Mastering Plant	The player must deposit the source code and collect the master tape.
3	The Duplication Plant	The player must collect eight tapes for distribution.
4	The M1	The player must try to catch a lift on the M1 motorway to bring the tapes to the Your Sinclair offices.
5	The Your Sinclair Offices	The player must prepare the tapes for distribution on the magazine.
6	The Newsagent	The player must stock the newsagent with copies of the magazine, to which the tape is attached.

== Plot ==
Monty is tasked with recovering the source code to his latest game and getting it to the duplication plant.

== Release ==
A competition was run when the game was released. The final screen contained a message to the player. The first person to complete the game and send this message to the Your Sinclair competition address would receive 15 games from the Your Sinclair library. Six runners-up also received three games each. In a retrospective article from 2003, GamesTM called Moley Christmas an "especially popular" cover game, and further praised it as a "great example" of video game publishers using Christmas to market their games to a wider audience.
