= Delta (video game) =

1987 video game

- Commodore 64 cover art
- Developer: Stavros Fasoulas
- Publisher: Thalamus Ltd
- Composer: Rob Hubbard
- Platforms: Commodore 64, ZX Spectrum
- Release: February 1987
- Genre: Scrolling shooter
- Modes: Single-player, multiplayer

Delta is a horizontally scrolling shooter released for the Commodore 64 by Thalamus Ltd in 1987. It was programmed by Stavros Fasoulas and the music was written by Rob Hubbard. The game was published as Delta Patrol in the United States by Electronic Arts, for its Amazing Software action game line, in 1987 on the Commodore 64. It was also released for the ZX Spectrum in 1990 as Delta Charge.

The menu-music is based on the theme of Koyaanisqatsi by Philip Glass and the in-game-music is based on Pink Floyd's "On the Run".

== Plot ==
Delta is a game in which the player character is a member of the Delta Patrol, an elite squadron of police in the Delta Sector, and has command of a battle cruiser. The dangers of the Delta Sector include lost ships and alien bandits among other unknown destructive forces, and the character must terminate the alien enemy forces that use these hazards to hide. Destroying an entire wave of enemies earns credits that the player may use to purchase weapons and ship modifications.

== Gameplay ==
The player controls a spaceship and gains power-up points by destroying formations of enemies. Some enemy formations instead subtract power-up points for the player, so the player must take note of which formations to destroy. Periodically blocks containing the power-ups (higher speed, faster rate of fire) appear and the player can pick one of them up: the more points the player has collected, the more powerful are the power-ups that can be chosen. Unavailable power-ups are gray and kill the player if he flies into them, making them part of the obstacles in the game. The effects of the power-ups are lost over time and must therefore be regained. The player gets a choice between in-game music or in-game sound effects. There is also a high score table but no way to save it when the game is turned off.

== Reception ==
Delta Patrol was reviewed in 1987 in Dragon #128 by Hartley, Patricia, and Kirk Lesser in "The Role of Computers" column. The reviewers gave the game 4 out of 5 stars. Computer Gaming World stated that "the graphics are not especially exciting and the game reminds this reviewer of the old Atari 2600 game, Megamania". Zzap!64 saw reviewers Julian Rignall, Gary Penn and Steve Jarratt divided by the game; none disliking it, but some not thinking it was as good as its predecessor Sanxion. The game received a 74% overall rating in the April 1987 issue.
