= Phantom of the Asteroid =

1986 video game

- Developer: Mastertronic
- Publisher: Mastertronic
- Designer: Martin Ellis
- Composer: Rob Hubbard
- Platform: Commodore 64
- Release: EU: March 1986
- Genre: Action-adventure
- Mode: Single-player

Phantom of the Asteroid is a side-scrolling action-adventure game released for the Commodore 64 in 1986. The cover art reads Phantom of the Asteroids, but the loading screen says Phantom of the Asteroid, while the title screen says Phantoms of the Asteroid. Sources variously use all three titles to refer to the game.

== Gameplay ==
Earth is menaced by an imminent asteroid impact; to prevent disaster, the player must plunge into the asteroid's depths, gather 36 uranium cubes, and escape to safety before the asteroid explodes.

Phantom of the Asteroid takes place in a vast, side-scrolling, subterranean maze within the eponymous asteroid. The player is an astronaut equipped with a jetpack, which must be regularly replenished with fuel using depots strewn around the labyrinth. The game contains numerous enemies, called Phantoms, which must be dispatched with the player's gun before they can drain the player's energy. The maze also contains many traps that will instantly kill the player, who has only a single life to complete the game. In order to progress deeper into the asteroid, the player must locate control pads to deactivate obstructive force fields, some of which will reactivate after a limited time. The main goal of the game is to find all 36 uranium cubes hidden throughout the asteroid, which is generally considered an extremely difficult task. Should the player obtain all of the cubes, they will have 5 minutes to escape the exploding asteroid; if they fail, the game is over. The game allows the player to save their current position on tape, so the game does not have to be completed in one sitting.

== Reception ==
Phantom of the Asteroid was well received by the gaming magazines of the day. C&VG gave it 7/10 for graphics, 9/10 for sound, 10/10 for value, and 8/10 for playability, devoting particular praise to Rob Hubbard's music, calling it a "neat and cheap treat" overall. Your Commodore gave it 5/10 for originality, 7/10 for playability, 8/10 for graphics, and 9/10 for value-for-money, criticizing the game's high difficulty and the necessity of starting the whole game over again after each death. Nevertheless, it concluded that "[t]his is definitely one of Mastertronic's better offerings. Spend £1.99 and die as many times as you like." Two of the game's three reviewers at Zzap! compared it to Rocket Roger, one unfavorably so, and all three complained that the game played too slowly. Nevertheless, they were united in their praise of the game's size, longevity, and music, awarding it 73% overall.

In a less positive review, Your Computer considered the game a side-scrolling version of Jet Power Jack, giving it a score of 3/5 and saying, "While not particularly original or brain-straining, it should keep you happy for a time."
