= Thing on a Spring =

1985 video game

- Developer: Gremlin Graphics
- Publisher: Gremlin Graphics
- Programmers: Jason Perkins; Anthony Clarke
- Artist: Mark Rogers
- Composer: Rob Hubbard
- Platforms: Amstrad CPC, Commodore 64
- Release: NA: 1985; EU: July 1985
- Genre: Puzzle-platform
- Mode: Single-player

Thing on a Spring is a side-scrolling puzzle-platform game released in 1985 for the Amstrad CPC and Commodore 64 by Gremlin Graphics. The player controls a character resembling Zebedee from The Magic Roundabout through a toy factory while avoiding evil toys.

The game was written by Jason Perkins and Anthony Clarke with graphics by Mark Rogers. The musical score was the first videogame tune ever composed by Rob Hubbard.

== Reception ==
Thing on a Spring was given an overall rating of 93% in issue 4 of Zzap!64 magazine, earning it a "Sizzler" rating. Julian Rignall wrote that "the sound is unbelievable, I won't describe it but just wait until you hear it; words fail".

Your Commodore said the game "isn't your run of the mill platform game, it's far superior to most that have been launched recently". They also said it had "some superb graphics and sound" and recommended a purchase. It was given a 4 out of 5 star rating.

Your 64 found the game's screens to be "very basic" but it was still "great fun". They praised the music which "helped make this game a frenetic experience" and said the game was "in the inimitable Gremlin style". It was rated 3 stars out of 5.

== Legacy ==
Along with Rockford from Boulder Dash, the Thing on a Spring character became a regular graphic element printed in the margins of Zzap!64.

Thing Bounces Back was released as a sequel in 1987, also by Gremlin.
