= Dun Darach =

1985 arcade adventure game

- Developer: Gargoyle Games
- Publisher: Gargoyle Games
- Designers: Greg Follis; Roy Carter
- Platforms: ZX Spectrum; Amstrad CPC
- Release: EU: 1985
- Genre: Action-adventure
- Mode: Single-player

Dun Darach (Note: Dún Darach is Irish for "Fort of the Oak", though mistranslated as "Hill of the Oak" (Cnoc Darach or Droim Darach). Darach can also be a boy's name.) is an action-adventure game developed and published in 1985 by Gargoyle Games for the ZX Spectrum and Amstrad CPC computers. It is a prequel to the 1984 game Tir Na Nog. The plot has Celtic hero Cuchulainn on a search to find his companion Lóeg in the mysterious city of Dun Darach. Inspiration for the game came from the works of Fritz Leiber and Michael Moorcock.

The background history is based on Celtic folklore about the demigod Cuchulainn and his battles against the people of Connachta in ancient Ireland. Dun Darach was critically acclaimed upon its original release, with praise singling out its graphics. Retrospective reviews were less than positive, with one reviewer preferring Tir Na Nog. It was re-released on different game compilations and cover tapes in issues of British video game magazines.

== Plot and gameplay ==
ZX Spectrum screenshot, Cuchulainn is in a trader's shop.

One day Cuchulainn travels home with his charioteer companion Lóeg from a battle against the Connachta. On the way, they stop off at an inn and Lóeg is persuaded to help a young woman named Skar, whose chariot is damaged. Cuchulainn realizes that Lóeg is missing after taking refreshment at the inn. He later discovers that Skar is a sorceress and ally of the Connachta, and has taken Lóeg to the Secret City of Dun Darach in retribution for the death of Prince Amhair, who perished in the battle. Cuchulainn goes on a long search for the mysterious city, eventually discovering it and entering to find Lóeg.

Dun Darach is an action-adventure game. The player guides Cuchulainn through Dun Darach and interacts with the environment by performing keyboard commands. The main objective is to find Lóeg, taking side quests from non-player characters (NPCs). These NPCs can give short hints to Cuchulainn, rob him, and confiscate his belongings if he carries stolen goods. Commands the player inputs can have him buy, steal and sell from shops in the city, bet at a casino (Iomain Ludum), and deposit money at a bank with daily compound interest. Dun Darach is large and consists of different quarters. The current time of the day is indicated by torches in the wall and by the greetings of characters.

== Development and release ==
Dun Darach was developed by Greg Follis and Roy Carter, the co-founders of game developer Gargoyle Games, as a prequel to their previous title, Tir Na Nog. It had the working title Cú Chulainn – The Early Years. Development first began on 10 February 1985. Follis claimed that the biggest complaint for Tir Na Nog was its huge setting, resulting in it being scaled back to one city. Inspiration for Dun Darach came from the works of Fritz Leiber and Michael Moorcock, with Gargoyle wanting the atmosphere to be similar to Leiber's book The Swords of Lankhmar. It was showcased at the LET trade show at the Olympia London, showing screenshots of the game.

One area had to be censored before release. There is an empty area in the centre of the city, the pleasure quarter "Iomain" which was originally intended to be a brothel called "Lady Q's" and would have opened into a whole red-light district. This was replaced with a sign saying "Forbidden". Dun Darach was launched for the ZX Spectrum in 1985. It was ported to the Amstrad CPC later that year. Carter remarked that it took ten days to do the conversion for the system. It was re-released by different software companies; Hewson Consultants' Rebound imprint in 1986, Gremlin Graphics in 1986 as part of their 4 Crash Smashes compilation, and on cover tapes in issues of Sinclair User and Your Sinclair.

== Reception and legacy ==
Reception

Review scores
Publication	Score
Amstrad Action	90%
Amtix	93%
Crash	97%
Computer and Video Games	29/30
Sinclair User	5/5

Awards
Publication	Award
Sinclair User	SU Classic
Crash	Crash Smash
C+VG	Hit

The original release of Dun Darach received critical acclaim, particularly for its graphics. The ZX Spectrum version was voted number 57 in the Your Sinclair Official Top 100 Games of All Time. Richard Price for Sinclair User, while describing the game as "less abstract" as Tir Na Nog, said it was more interesting and eventful than its predecessor. Computer And Video Games considered it a worthy successor to the first, calling it "entertaining". A reviewer for Crash declared it an essential purchase for ZX Spectrum owners and saw it as a contender for game of the year. Retrospective appraisals were less agreeable. Eurogamer contributor Peter Parrish offered an average score overall, dubbing it "mystifying". Ian Marks from Retro Gamer compared it to Tir Na Nog, saying both were fun to play but Dun Darach was not as good. Marks also noted the novelty of the graphics wore off.
