= Hunter Patrol =

1985 video game

- Title screen
- Publisher(s): Mastertronic
- Designer(s): Steve Lee
- Composer(s): Rob Hubbard
- Platform(s): Commodore 64
- Release: NA: 1985; EU: 1985
- Genre(s): Shoot 'em up
- Mode(s): Single-player

Hunter Patrol is a shoot 'em up written by Steve Lee for the Commodore 64 and published by Mastertronic in 1985. The music was composed by Rob Hubbard. The game is similar in style to the Sega arcade game Buck Rogers: Planet of Zoom.

== Gameplay ==
Taking control of a WW2 airplane, the player attacks enemy installations on the ground whilst avoiding enemy planes and flak. Once a sufficient number of installations are destroyed, the level's main target appears. When this had been taken care of the player moves on to the next level with the rewards of a score bonus and an extra life.
