= One Man and His Droid =

1985 video game

- Developer: Clive Brooker
- Publisher: Mastertronic
- Composer: Rob Hubbard
- Platforms: Amstrad CPC, Atari 8-bit, Commodore 64 / C16, ZX Spectrum
- Release: 1985
- Genres: Action, puzzle
- Mode: Single-player

One Man and His Droid is a game published by Mastertronic in 1985 for use on the Amstrad CPC, Atari 8-bit computers, Commodore 16, Commodore 64, and ZX Spectrum. The name of the game is a play on the title of the BBC television show One Man and His Dog. The object of the game is to use a droid to collect Ramboids, the male form of alien sheep. The player must move these Ramboids into teleporters to win the game.

== Gameplay ==
Gameplay screenshot (Atari 8-bit)

Before the game begins, the player is given the option of inputting a password in order to resume a game they were playing earlier, otherwise starting at the beginning. There are passwords for each of the twenty different ramboid-filled caverns, and as the player progresses through each cavern, the computer releases the corresponding password.

At the start of a game, the screen is split up into several different windows. Largest and centrally placed is the main window that looks into a cavern, displaying a view of the droid placed centrally amongst the scenery. The first task is to guide the droid to the start position.

Ramboids are dim. They move very predictably, and always reverse their direction of movement if their way is blocked. They are also delicate creatures that only live for about twenty minutes. The player is working against the clock all the time. Should the player fail to get at least four Ramboids in the teleport in the right order within the time, play is returned to the first screen.

== Music ==
The music for the Commodore 64 version was composed by Rob Hubbard. Commodore 64 enthusiasts and former owners frequently list Hubbard's composition as being one of the finest to feature in any game released for that machine. Hubbard himself states that he took inspiration from Jean-Michel Jarres' album Magnetic Fields for this song.

The Atari 8-bit and Amstrad versions had a different theme, which was shorter.

== Reception ==
Zzap!64's reviewers thought that, although the game had basic graphics, it was enjoyable to play, with the bonus of a good soundtrack. It was given an overall rating of 81%.

== Legacy ==
A follow-up, One Man and his Droid II, was written for the ZX Spectrum in 1991 but wasn't commercially published. It was eventually released on the internet in 2001 by its programmer, Clive Brooker.
