= Sweevo's World =

1986 video game

- Developer: Gargoyle Games
- Publisher: Gargoyle Games
- Designers: Roy Carter; Greg Follis
- Platforms: ZX Spectrum, Amstrad CPC
- Release: 1986
- Genre: Action-adventure
- Mode: Single-player

Sweevo's World is an isometric action-adventure game released by Gargoyle Games in 1986 for the ZX Spectrum and Amstrad CPC. An enhanced version for the Spectrum 128K was released as Sweevo's Whirled. The game was partially inspired by the Laurel and Hardy films, with Sweevo modelled on Stan Laurel. A sequel was released in 1987: Hydrofool.

== Plot ==
The artificial planetoid Knutz Folly has been overrun by the genetic experiments of Baron Knutz. The robot SWEEVO (Self Willed Extreme Environment Vocational Organism) must clean the place up to achieve Active Status.

== Gameplay ==
Sweevo must find and destroy the malfunctioning Waste Ingestion and Janitor Units ("Wijus") that are supposed to keep Knutz Folly clean, while avoiding various hostile creatures and structures. Among the other characters inhabiting Knutz Folly are the Goose Which Laid The Golden Erg (sic), the Horrible Little Girls ("Minxes"), and the Goose-Stepping Dictators. "Brownies" may be collected for additional brownie points.

Sweevo cannot jump and must rely on elevators to climb obstacles. He is not armed but can kill enemies by dropping objects on them or manoeuvring them into traps.

== Reception ==
Reception

Review scores
Publication	Score
Crash	95%
Computer and Video Games	34/40
Sinclair User	5/5

Award
Publication	Award
Crash	Smash

Sweevo's World received positive reception from video game journalists.
