= Wanted: Monty Mole =

1984 video game

- Developers: Peter Harrap (Spectrum); Antony Crowther (C64)
- Publisher: Gremlin Graphics
- Platforms: Commodore 64, ZX Spectrum
- Release: EU: 29 July 1984
- Genre: Platformer
- Mode: Single-player

Wanted: Monty Mole is a platform video game published in July 1984 for the ZX Spectrum and Commodore 64 home computers. It is the first game released by Gremlin Graphics and the first game in the Monty Mole series. Monty Mole is a fictional mole created by Ian Stewart, the director of the company.

== Gameplay ==
Commodore 64 screenshot

The player controls the titular mole who has to travel around a coal mine collecting pieces of coal and other miscellaneous objects while avoiding various nasties and the infamous crushers. The style of gameplay is typical of platform games of the 1980s. The ZX Spectrum version is a flip-screen game while the Commodore 64 version uses scrolling. The game was inspired by the UK miners' strike of 1984–85, and even featured a character based on union leader Arthur Scargill.

== Music ==
- The tune that plays when Monty loses a life is the hymn "Abide with Me".
- The music is a downtempo cover of the "Colonel Bogey March".

== Reception ==
Reception

Award
Publication	Award
Crash	Crash Smash

Wanted: Monty Mole reached number 2 in the all-formats sales charts behind Daley Thompson's Decathlon in the week up to 13 September 1984. It topped the ZX Spectrum charts in the same week before being replaced by Daley Thompson's Decathlon the following week. Gremlin Graphics reported that they had sold 20,000 copies in the first six weeks.

The game was positively received by critics. Crash rated it 92%, describing it as a "fantastic Jet Set Willy type of game with excellent graphics and a good use of colour throughout". Personal Computer Games gave it 80%, saying "if you can put up with a measure of frustration, Monty Mole will unearth a great deal of action for your money", while also praising the graphics.

It also won Crash magazine's readers award for best platform game in 1984.

== Sequels ==
- Monty Is Innocent (1985). In this game, Monty has been sentenced to five years in Scudmore Prison for stealing a bucket of coal. Monty's best friend, the mysterious masked weasel, Sam Stoat, is determined to set Monty free.
- Monty on the Run (1985). In this episode, Monty is on the run from the authorities after his intervention in the Miners' strike. He must escape from his house and head for the English Channel and freedom in Europe.
- Auf Wiedersehen Monty (1987). In this instalment, Monty travels around Europe collecting money in order to buy a Greek island - Montos, where he can safely retire.
- Moley Christmas (1987). Released as a covertape with Your Sinclair magazine, Monty is tasked with recovering the source code to his latest game and getting it to the duplication plant.
- Impossamole (1990), remaking Monty as a cape-clad superhero who is recruited by aliens to retrieve their sacred scrolls.
- Monty: Revenge of the Mole (2013), released after it was selected as the winner of a Monty Mole game design competition held by Games Britannia in British schools; the game was developed by Steel Minions Studio, as adapted from the winning design. All proceeds from sales of the games went to the charity SpecialEffect, a charity aimed at helping physically disabled people play video games.
