= Kwalee =

Video game company

Kwalee Ltd.
- Type: Private
- Industry: Video games
- Founded: 2011; 15 years ago
- Founder: David Darling
- Headquarters: Leamington Spa, England
- Area served: Worldwide
- Key people: David Darling; (CEO); Jason Falcus; (COO)
- Subsidiaries: Tictales
- Website: kwalee.com

Kwalee Ltd. is a British video game developer and publisher. The company was founded in May 2011 by David Darling, co-founder and former CEO of Codemasters. The company publishes hypercasual games on mobile, PC, console, and mobile platforms. Based in Leamington Spa in the county of Warwickshire, Kwalee is one of the several companies that make up the Leamington Spa video gaming cluster. The name is Australian Aboriginal for “wait for me”, the name of a sailboat owned by Darling's grandfather.

As of 2022, the company also has offices in Bangalore, Beijing and Portugal. Kwalee employs over 180 people in its offices, including Andrew Graham (designer and programmer of Micro Machines) and COO Jason Falcus (programmer of NBA Jam).

== History ==
In 2019, the company began to publish PC and console games with Max Everingham from Team17 through a new division. These games are published under the brand "Kwalee Gaming".

In 2018, Kwalee implemented a profit sharing scheme where employees would receive bonuses based on the success of their games; in February 2020, Kwalee claimed that £1 million in bonuses were paid.

In 2021, Kwalee donated their game Teacher Simulator's UK profits during the first week of the school term to FareShare, a charity that tackles child food poverty in the United Kingdom.

On 24 January 2022, Kwalee acquired the French studio Tictales, who published visual novel mobile games.

On 5 July 2024, Kwalee acquired a 3.58% minority share in Devolver Digital.

On 10 October 2024, Microids established a new third-party publishing division with Kwalee. The first published title under it was The Precinct.

Less than one month after the release of Luna Abyss (a AA shooter) in May 2026, the entire development team of Kwalee Labs was laid off. No reason was given to the public; in a personal LinkedIn post, CEO Hollie Emery stated that the decision was "completely outside of their control".

== Published titles ==
=== Mobile games ===
| Year | Name | Genre | Platform |
|---|---|---|---|
| 2024 | Text Express: Word Adventure | Puzzle | iOS and Android |
| 2023 | Landlord Simulator | Simulation | iOS and Android |
| 2022 | Perfect Coffee 3D | Simulation | iOS and Android |
| 2022 | Airport Security | Simulation | iOS and Android |
| 2020 | Line Up: Draw the Criminal | Simulation | iOS and Android |
| 2020 | Hook and Smash | Arcade | iOS and Android |
| 2020 | Sneak Thief 3D | Action | iOS and Android |
| 2020 | Bake it | Simulation | iOS and Android |
| 2020 | OverTake | Racing | iOS and Android |
| 2019 | Off the Rails 3D | Arcade | iOS and Android |
| 2019 | Crazy Shopping | Arcade | iOS and Android |
| 2019 | Drop & Smash | Arcade | iOS and Android |
| 2019 | Rocket Sky! | Arcade | iOS and Android |
| 2019 | Shootout 3D | Puzzle | iOS and Android |
| 2019 | Jetpack Jump | Sports | iOS and Android |
| 2019 | Draw It | Arcade | iOS and Android |
| 2018 | Go Fish | Sports | iOS and Android |
| 2018 | PLANK! | Arcade | iOS and Android |
| 2018 | Looper! | Music | iOS and Android |
| 2018 | Skiddy Car | Racing | iOS and Android |
| 2018 | SPILLZ | Puzzle | iOS and Android |
| 2017 | TENS! | Puzzle | iOS and Android |
| 2012 | Farm Fighters | Arcade | iOS and Android |
| 2012 | Flip the Cats | Puzzle | iOS and Android |
| 2012 | Gobang Social | Puzzle | iOS and Android |

=== PC & console games ===
| Year | Game | Developers | Platform |
|---|---|---|---|
| 2020 | TENS! | Sock Monkey Studios | PC, Nintendo Switch |
| 2020 | Eternal Hope | Doublehit Games | PC |
| 2022 | Scathe | DAMAGE STATE | PC |
| 2023 | Die by the Blade | Triple Hill Interactive, Toko Midori Games | PC PlayStation 4, PlayStation 5, Xbox Series X/S, Nintendo Switch |
| 2023 | Wildmender | Muse Games | PC, PlayStation 5, Xbox Series X/S |
| 2024 | Robobeat | Inzanity | PC, PlayStation 5, Xbox Series X/S, Nintendo Switch |
| 2024 | Voidwrought | PowerSnake | PC, PlayStation 5, Xbox Series X/S, Nintendo Switch |
| 2024 | In Sink | Clock Out Games | PC |
| 2024 | The Spirit of the Samurai | Digital Minds s.l. | PC |
| 2025 | The Precinct | Fallen Tree Games | PC, PlayStation 5, Xbox Series X/S |
| 2025 | Space Chef | Blue Goo Games | PC, PlayStation 5, Xbox Series X/S, Nintendo Switch |
| 2025 | Feign | Teneke Kafalar | PC |
| 2026 | Don't Stop, Girlypop! | Funny Fintan Softworks | PC |
| 2026 | Hordes of Hunger | Hyperstrange | PC |
| 2026 | The Coin Game | devotid | PC, PlayStation 5, Xbox Series X/S |
| 2026 | GRIME II | Clover Bite | PC, PlayStation 5, Xbox Series X/S, Nintendo Switch, Nintendo Switch 2 |
| 2026 | Modulus: Factory Automation | Happy Volcano | PC |
| 2026 | Ground Zero | Malformation Games | PC, PlayStation 5, Xbox Series X/S |
| 2026 | Call of the Elder Gods | Out of the Blue Games | PC, PlayStation 5, Xbox Series X/S, Nintendo Switch 2 |
| 2026 | Rune Dice | Smart Raven Studio | PC, PlayStation 5, Xbox Series X/S, Nintendo Switch |
| 2026 | Luna Abyss | Kwalee Labs | PC, PlayStation 5, Xbox Series X/S |
| 2026 | Town to City | Galaxy Grove | PC |
| 2026 | Shift at Midnight | Bun Muen | PC, Xbox Series X/S |
| 2026 | lily's world XD | Emily Pitcher | PC |
| 2026 | Talespinner | Flash Cat Games | PC, Nintendo Switch |
| 2026 | Sprawl Zero | Maeth | PC, PlayStation 5, Xbox Series X/S, Nintendo Switch 2 |
| 2026 | Welcome to Elderfield | Chris Cote | PC |
| 2026 | RetroSpace | The Wild Gentlemen | PC, PlayStation 5, Xbox Series X/S, Nintendo Switch 2 |
| 2026 | Afterbeat | Vitamin Games | PC |
| 2026 | Lost Hellden | Artisan Studios | PC, PlayStation 5, Xbox Series X/S, Nintendo Switch |
| 2026 | BPM Bitcrushed | Awe Interactive | PC, PlayStation 5, Xbox Series X/S, Nintendo Switch |
| 2026 | Hark the Ghoul | Deep Denizens | PC |
| 2027 | Call it a Day | Egobounds, Nulldog | PC |
| TBA | Steam to Electric | Galaxy Grove | PC |
| TBA | Vampire: The Masquerade - Eternal Whispers | Flyos | PC |

== Awards ==
In 2012, Kwalee was named in the Startups 100 awards as one of the UK's most innovative, inspiring and ground-breaking new companies.

In 2019, its game Shootout 3D was awarded a TIGA award for 'Best Puzzle Game'.

In App Annie's Top Publisher Awards 2021, awarded based on overall mobile downloads throughout 2020, Kwalee was named the UK's biggest mobile game publisher by downloads and the UK's third highest-ranked app publisher overall behind the BBC and the NHS.

In 2021, Kwalee was nominated in the Best Publisher and Best Developer categories at the PocketGamer.biz Mobile Game Awards.

In 2022, the company won the title as Publisher of the Year at both the TIGA Games Industry Awards 2022 and the PocketGamer Mobile Game Awards 2022.

It was also named in the Top 50 Mobile Game Makers of 2021, 2022, 2023, and 2024.
