= Warhawk (1986 video game) =

- Developer: Proteus Developments
- Publisher: Firebird
- Composer: Rob Hubbard
- Platforms: Commodore 64, Atari 8-bit, Amstrad CPC, Atari ST
- Release: 1986
- Genre: Scrolling shooter
- Mode: Single-player

Warhawk is a vertically scrolling shooter published in 1986 by Firebird Software. It was released for the Commodore 64, Atari 8-bit computers, Amstrad CPC, and Atari ST.

The 8-bit versions of the game were budget-priced releases on Firebird's "Silver 199" sub-label.

== Gameplay ==
The player must dodge and destroy obstacles along a vertically scrolling screen. The end of each level has a large number of ships flying at the player from many angles.

== Reception ==
Computer and Video Games reviewed the Atari version which they compared to Uridium. They admired the asteroid graphics but thought those of the aliens were a little weak though "they swoop around fast enough to keep you on your toes". The game was awarded a 7/10 score.

Commodore User praised the game's presentation, graphics and enemy AI which was considered to be superior to Uridium's. It was given an 8/10 overall score.

== Legacy ==
The following year, Proteus Developments developed Tanium, published by Players Software in 1988. The version for the Commodore 64 was declared to be Warhawk II on the title screen and the link was mentioned in reviews, but was not indicated in versions for other platforms.
