= IBall (toy) =

iBall is a kinetic toy that demonstrates Newton's laws of motion. It features a clear plastic sphere containing seven metal balls and offers multiple gameplay challenges—some of which are listed on the packaging—such as launching a single ball into orbit or getting three balls to orbit in different directions simultaneously. Released in 2007 by Winning Moves Games USA, the toy is no longer in production.
