= Impossamole =

1990 video game

- Developer: Core Design
- Publisher: Gremlin Graphics
- Producer: James North-Hearn
- Designers: Alex Davis; Berni Hill; Ian Stewart
- Programmers: Alex Davis; Ashley Bennett
- Artists: Berni Hill; Tim May
- Composer: Barry Leitch
- Platforms: Amiga, Atari ST, Commodore 64, ZX Spectrum, Amstrad CPC, TurboGrafx-16
- Release: 1990
- Genre: Platform
- Mode: Single-player

Impossamole is a platform game developed by Core Design for the Amiga, Atari ST, Commodore 64, Amstrad CPC and ZX Spectrum. It was released in 1990 and published by Gremlin Graphics. NEC Technologies published it on TurboGrafx-16 the following year. It is the sixth and final game in the Monty Mole series.

== Gameplay ==

This game is similar to Rick Dangerous 2, another Core Design game. It features the cape-clad superhero Monty Mole who is recruited by aliens to retrieve their sacred scrolls. As in Rick Dangerous 2, the first four levels may be played in any order. Completing these four levels (the Orient, Klondike mines, Ice and Amazon forest) unlocks the fifth and final level. The game's level themes are similar to Rick Dangerous 2.

The player progresses horizontally as well as climbing up ladders. Monty Mole is equipped with weapons and is able to do a flying kick to defend himself against enemy creatures lurking about.
