= Heavy on the Magick =

1986 video game

- Developer: Gargoyle Games
- Publisher: Gargoyle Games
- Designers: Greg Follis; Royston Carter
- Composer: Mark Time
- Platforms: ZX Spectrum, Amstrad CPC
- Release: EU: 1986
- Genre: Adventure
- Mode: Single-player

Heavy on the Magick is an adventure video game for Amstrad CPC and ZX Spectrum published in 1986 by Gargoyle Games. It was heavily influenced by the occult, with the Master Therion in the plot being a reference to Aleister Crowley. To finish the game, the player must invoke numerous demons who are based on their "real" counterparts, e.g. Belezbar is based on Beelzebub.

== Gameplay ==
The player controls the neophyte wizard Axil the Able and must help him escape from the dungeons below the castle of Colloden's Pile. This a keyboard-only game, and uses a set of commands (called "Merphish" in-game) such as the standard north, south, east and west (N,S,E,W) and some additional unique commands such as invoke (I), freeze (f), and blast (b) which cast spells. Conversations with certain friendly characters such as Apex the Ogre are initiated in the following syntax: "[character],[speech]" e.g. "Apex, thanks".

The dungeons are full of dangerous and hostile creatures such as wyverns, goblins and vampires. Axil can defend himself using magic to stall or kill these creatures. Not everyone in the dungeon is an enemy, some inhabitants (such as Apex the Ogre) are friendly unless provoked and can be conversed with.

The dungeon itself is separated into several distinct levels which Axil can travel to and from at will provided he can find the staircases up or down.

The game could be finished in three different ways, each way being of varying difficulty. The game was planned to be the first part of a trilogy, but the other games were never created.

== Reception ==
Reception

Awards
| Publication | Award |
|---|---|
| Crash | Crash Smash |
| Sinclair User | SU Classic |
| Your Sinclair | Megagame |
| Amstrad Action | Mastergame |

Reviews of the game were highly positive all round, with the only common criticism being the blocky graphics. To reduce the memory impact of the large animated graphics, the programmers scaled up single pixels to create all the sprites and foreground scenery in the game, effectively reducing the resolution of the graphics but compressing them in memory and so increasing the amount of space available for game content.

The game won the award for best adventure game of the year in CRASH. It was also runner-up in the Golden Joystick Awards.
