= Press Play On Tape =

Danish band

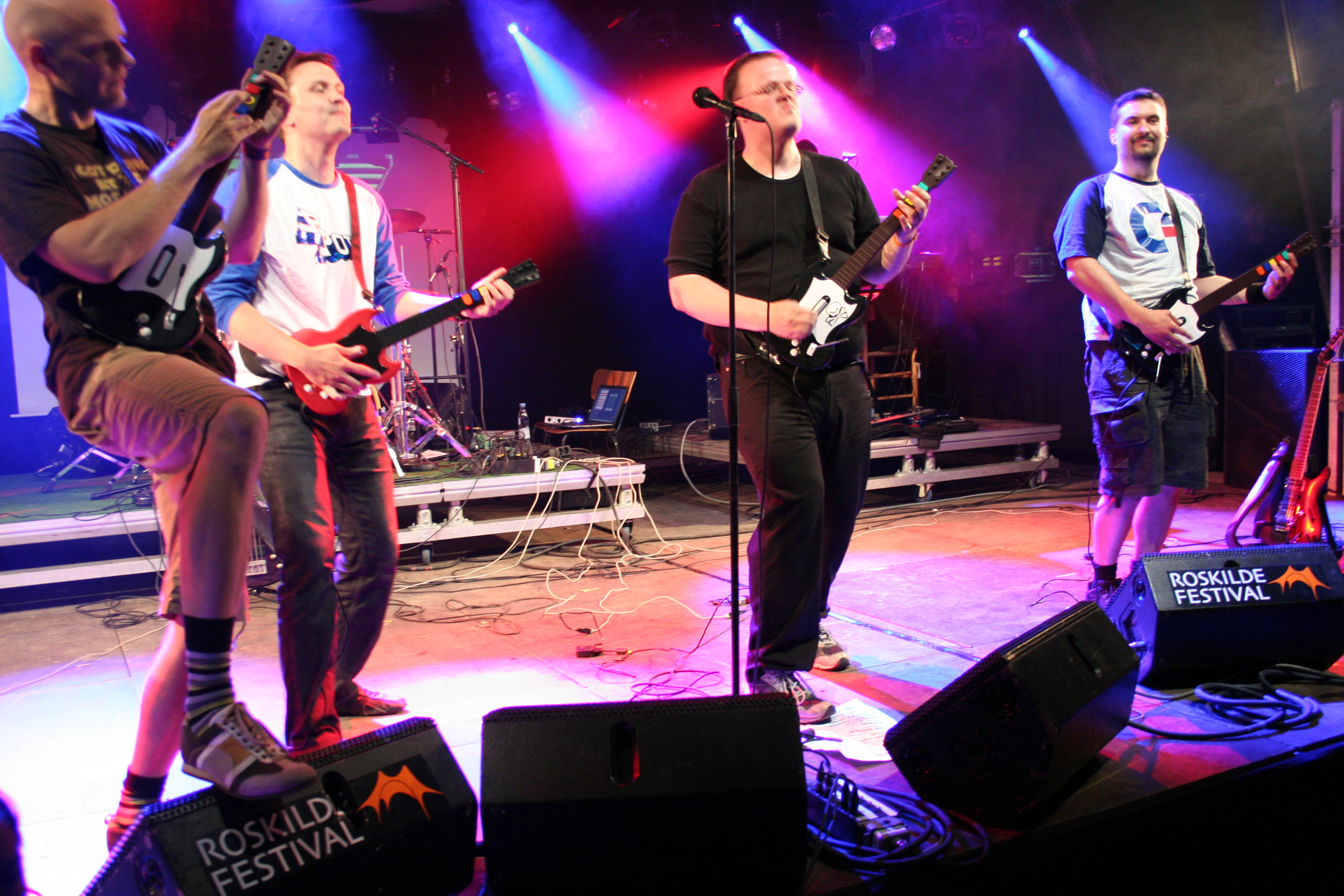
Press Play On Tape performing at the Roskilde Festival in 2008.

Press Play On Tape (PPOT) is a Danish band that uses Commodore 64 tunes. The band formed in 1999 and has six members. The band classifies itself as a rock and bitpop band. The band's name originates from the message that the Commodore 64 computer outputs as a response to the LOAD command.

== Members ==
All of the members are alumni of the computer science programme at the University of Copenhagen. Theo Engell-Nielsen serves as the keyboardist. Jesper Holm Olsen is a guitarist in the band. The other members are Martin Koch, Uffe Friis Lichtenberg, Søren Trautner Madsen, and André Glasius Tischer.

== Music and style ==
The band takes music tracks from Commodore 64 games and converts them into rock music. The bass, drums, and distorted guitars are used to add to the music of the Commodore 64. Engell-Nielsen said that when playing Commodore 64 games he and the other band members heard rock music orchestra-like tunes while his parents heard "blip-blip".

== CD releases and performances ==
In 2000 the band released the CD "Loading Ready Run" and in 2004 it released the CD "Run/Stop Restore". By 2007 the band's performances has been posted to Myspace and YouTube, and at K.B. Hallen the band performed an opening act for the Danish band Mew. By 2009 the band had performed throughout Europe. In 2008, the band had a performance at the Roskilde Festival. Martin Galway, Jon Hare, and Rob Hubbard had performed with PPOT.

In 2012, the band released the double album "Home Computer".
