= Shockway Rider =

1987 video game

- Developer: Carter Follis Software Associates
- Publisher: Faster Than Light
- Platforms: Amstrad CPC, Commodore 64, ZX Spectrum
- Release: March 1987
- Genres: Fighting, Shooting, Action

Shockway Rider is an action fighting and shooting game released for the Amstrad CPC, the Commodore 64, and the ZX Spectrum. It was developed by Carter Follis Software Associates and was released in 1987.

The game takes place in the future where cities are surrounded by "shockways," moving pedestrian walkways. The player must make their way around the town on the shockway while avoiding pedestrians and obstacles.

== Reception ==
Reception

Awards
Publication	Award
Sinclair User	SU Classic
Your Sinclair	Megagame
Computer and Video Games	C+VG Hit
