= Mastertronic =

British computer game publisher

- Screenshot of the official logo
- Industry: Computer game software
- Founded: 1983
- Founders: Martin Alper; Frank Herman; Terry Medway; Alan Sharam
- Fate: Merged with Virgin Group in 1988, and acquired by Sega in 1991. Publishing operations renamed Virgin Interactive Entertainment

Mastertronic was originally a British publisher and distributor of low-cost computer game software founded in 1983 in London. Their first games were launched on April 2, 1984. At its peak the label was one of the largest software publishers in the UK, achieved by selling cassette-based software at £1.99. As well as supplying leading retailers such as Woolworth's and Toys "R" Us, Mastertronic sold software in outlets such as newsagents which had not been previously associated with the software market.

Their range of budget games were highly successful during the 1980s, with titles such as Kikstart, Action Biker, Finders Keepers, Chiller and Flash Gordon (released under the M.A.D. Label).

Later diversification included the setting up of US operations to source and distribute its software, as well as an unsuccessful arcade games division (Arcadia Systems). However, it was its decision to market the Master System in the UK that ultimately proved most successful. It resulted in the Master System selling much better than its rival, the NES, than in many other territories and was cited by some as Virgin Group's reason for investing in the company (and later buying it outright).

As the budget software market declined, the Sega hardware distribution became the dominant part of the business, and the company was eventually merged into Sega itself. Although the original company no longer exists, the rights to the name were acquired by another company, Mastertronic Group, formed in 2006 as a result of a merger of The Producers and Sold Out Sales & Marketing with Frank Herman, one of the founders of the original company, as its chairman.

== History ==
In 1983 Martin Alper, Frank Herman (died 2009), Terry Medway and Alan Sharam founded the computer game publishing company Mastertronic. The four had some financial backing from a small group of outside investors and previous experience in video distribution. Their initial venture involved bundling packages of 100 tapes ("dealer packs") and sending them to newsagents, toy shops, motorway service stations, or just about anyone who would take them. Another key figure at the time was ex-Notts Cricket batsman Richard Bielby, who ran a distribution network servicing a large number of small retailers.

=== New labels, expansion and diversification ===
In late 1985 Mastertronic launched their Mastertronic Added Dimension (M.A.D.) label to sell games at a slightly higher price (£2.99). The first game was The Last V8 and many more were soon to follow including Knight Tyme and 180.

Martin Alper, who had the most marketing flair, went to the United States in 1986 to set up Mastertronic Inc. The UK company was managed by Frank Herman, whilst Alan Sharam increasingly specialised in sales and logistics (warehousing, packaging, controlling production schedules). As the business continued to grow Mastertronic created another label in 1986, Entertainment USA, when it began working closely with several American writers including Sculptured Software and Randall Masteller. They wanted an outlet to sell games to the UK market, and so Mastertronic moved in, often using Rob Hubbard or David Whittaker to re-do the music.

In 1987 Mastertronic decided to expand its distribution of software and began exporting titles back across the Atlantic, so the label Bulldog was created primarily to distribute the 'Best of British' games in the US (The name Bulldog actually came from a small wholesaler called Bulldog Distribution who got into financial difficulties and was taken over the previous year). Several other labels were invented for other publishers who wanted it to re-issue their old full price product at budget prices, such as Rack-it for Hewson and Americana for U.S. Gold.

Their re-release label Ricochet was created in 1987 with their most successful release being Activision's Ghostbusters with nearly half a million copies sold. A buyout of Melbourne House when that label was struggling with financial problems enabled it to add games such as The Way of the Exploding Fist to its re-release catalogue.

=== Video and music ===
In March 1987 Mastertronic launched the short-lived Master Vision and Master Sound labels, with an aim of releasing low priced video and music cassettes. During the brief life-span of the company, the only notable releases were the films Creepshow and The Exterminator.

=== Arcadia Systems ===
In 1987, Mastertronic started a venture to develop arcade games under the name Arcadia. The intent was that the hardware would be based around the chipset from Commodore's Amiga computers, and that the same game could run on both Arcadia hardware and home systems, reducing development cost.

However, Arcadia was a failure; according to Mastertronic's then-financial controller, Anthony Guter, the games were of poor quality and not suited to arcade-style play. Guter noted that while those within Mastertronic who played games were aware of the difference in style between arcade and home games, the directors in charge of the company were not. According to Guter, Arcadia's failure nearly bankrupted the company.

=== Merger with Virgin ===
Having bought Melbourne House and with heavy financial commitments to the Arcadia project Mastertronic (now renamed the 'Mastertronic Group Ltd') was now suffering severe cash flow problems. Virgin stepped in and purchased the 45% of shares held by the outside investment group. The remaining 55% was held by Alper (25%), Herman (20%) and Sharam (10%) until 1988 when they sold out in a highly complex deal which required their continuing involvement in the business and achievement of profit and cash flow targets. The merger created Virgin Mastertronic although the company would continue to publish titles under the Mastertronic, Melbourne House and Virgin Games labels for several more years.

It was Frank Herman who, in early 1987, spotted that Sega had no UK distributor for the Master System range. Mastertronic sold all they could get that year and were then appointed as distributors in France and Germany as well, and thus Sega Europe was born.

=== Sega takeover ===
Soon after the completion of the merger all the marketing effort went into full-price games under the Melbourne House label and it was clear that the budget side was sliding into oblivion, the competition had become intense as everyone was recycling their old full-price games as budget games. In addition, the children who used to buy 8-bit computers were now buying Sega and Nintendo consoles. Sega sales were booming so much that nobody really cared about the traditional Mastertronic business. Although staff recruitment actually rose, this was all for the Sega operations. By 1991 nearly all the company's turnover, and certainly all the profit, came from Sega-related business.

As a result, nearly all the staff moved over to Sega when they took over the business from Virgin and only a handful of game programmers stayed with the publishing side (quickly renamed Virgin Interactive Entertainment). After the Sega takeover Frank became deputy Managing Director of Sega Europe and Alan was Managing Director of Sega UK. Martin left the UK and became a resident in the US.

== Influence on the industry ==
Compared to its main competitors, Mastertronic was a highly professional operation. The management understood that sourcing games was relatively easy while marketing and distribution was the hard part. Emphasis was set on creating a brand image, establishing distributor chains, persuading the larger high street stores to stock the product and ensuring a fast turn-round from the tape duplicators and the printers so that fresh supplies of successful games could be produced quickly.

Much of the early output was supplied by just two producers: the Darling brothers, who formed Codemasters as soon as they could break their contract with the company, and Mr. Chip Software who continued to write games for Mastertronic for some time. Mastertronic never employed in-house programmers to write games. Everything that was published had been produced either by other software houses or by freelance authors. This was an ideal approach for the fast output of many diverse games. At this time thousands of bedroom programmers were trying to get rich quickly by writing games. While this was not so good for creating a consistent throughput of a series or for developing highly complex games, one huge advantage was that it kept overheads low and outsourced the risks of software development to others. Mastertronic did employ specialists to review and test games, to encourage and assist authors and to provide technical expertise. As well as permanent staff temporary assistance came from several game authors, including Nigel Johnstone, Richard Aplin, Mike Harrison, Jeremy Burrell, Stephen N Curtis and Tony Takoushi.

One of Mastertronic's key markets was the Commodore 64. Composer Rob Hubbard produced music for the company's C64 range such as One Man and His Droid, Hunter Patrol, Spellbound, Action Biker, Phantom of the Asteroid, and Master of Magic. These are still regarded by many enthusiasts as classics and having music of this quality on budget-priced games greatly enhanced Mastertronic's reputation.
