= Amtix =

Video game magazine

- Issue 1, November 1985
- Categories: Computer magazine
- Frequency: Monthly
- First issue: November 1985; 40 years ago
- Final issue Number: April 1987; 39 years ago 18
- Company: Newsfield Publications Ltd
- Country: United Kingdom
- Language: English
- ISSN: 0952-3022

Amtix (stylized as A^{M}_{TIX!}) is a magazine that originally reviewed Amstrad CPC computer software in the mid-1980s, published monthly by Newsfield Publications Ltd.

Unlike Zzap!64 and CRASH (its more successful sister publications from Newsfield), the original version of Amtix! was relatively short-lived. It ran for 18 issues in total between November 1985 and April 1987, plus a special preview issue (Issue zero) which was given away with Zzap!64 and CRASH.

After issue 18, Amtix! was sold to Database Publications who merged the Amtix! games sections into their own Computing With the Amstrad magazine.

Like Zzap!64 and Crash, Amtix! had very distinctive, comic-style cover art, drawn by Oliver Frey.

In September 2021 the magazine was relaunched as a quarterly A5 publication by Fusion Retro Books under the title AMTIXCPC Micro Action. Twelve issues of AMTIX were subsequently published before the title closed again.
