= Crash (magazine) =

Computer magazine

- Issue 1 cover
- Editor: Roger Kean (Feb '84 – Aug '85); Graeme Kidd (Aug '85 – Mar 87); Roger Kean (Apr '87 – Sep '87); Barnaby Page (Oct '87 – Mar '88); Steve Jarratt (Apr '88 – Jul '88); Dominic Handy (Aug '88 – Mar '89); Stuart Wynne (Apr '89 – May '89); Oliver Frey (Jun '89 – Mar '91); Richard Eddy (Apr '91 – Oct '91); Lucy Hickman (Dec '91 – Apr '92); Chris Wilkins (Dec 2020 – present)
- Categories: Computer games magazine
- Frequency: Monthly/Quarterly
- Circulation: 101,483 (peak)
- First issue: February 1984
- Final issue Number: April 1992 (originally); 98 (originally)
- Company: Newsfield Publications Ltd; Europress; Fusion Retro
- Country: United Kingdom
- Language: English
- Website: http://www.crashonline.org.uk/
- ISSN: 0954-8661

Crash, stylized as CRASH, is a magazine dedicated to the ZX Spectrum home computer, primarily focused on games. It was published from 1984 to 1991 by Newsfield Publications Ltd until their liquidation, and then until 1992 by Europress. It was relaunched as a quarterly A5 magazine in December 2020 with the backing of the original founders.

The magazine was launched to cater for the booming Spectrum games market. It was immediately popular owing to its quality of writing and distinctive, though occasionally controversial, artwork created by Oliver Frey. By 1986 it had become the biggest-selling British computer magazine with over 100,000 copies sold monthly, but struggled towards the end of the decade after other magazines put cassettes of games on the front cover. In the 2010s, a number of retrospective issues were created via a kickstarter campaign leading to the new publication by Fusion Retro.

== History ==
The "Crash Smash" accolade, awarded to reviewers' favourite games, was considered important by the UK software industry.

Crash was launched in 1983 in Ludlow, Shropshire by Roger Kean, Oliver Frey and Franco Frey. The trio had met the previous year when they were working for newspaper publisher Alan Purnell, learning how to write and produce a magazine from scratch. Franco Frey had worked for an electronics company, and had been asked by one of his business contacts if could get hold of video games. Kean remembers that "the High Street was ignorant of computer games" and they wanted to source titles and sell them. They set up a mail order catalogue called Crash Micro Games Action and advertised in contemporary computer magazines such as Computer and Video Games. It was immediately successful, so by late 1983, they decided to launch a dedicated magazine, forming the company Newsfield to do so. Kean and Oliver Frey wanted a catchy title for the magazine, choosing "Crash" after J. G. Ballard's novel of the same name.

Though he had regularly played video games throughout the 1970s, the middle-aged Kean realised that the target market for the magazine was teenagers and young men, and the writing needed to accommodate this. Consequently, he hired teenage staff writer Matthew Uffindel and the pair recruited local schoolchildren to review the games, including Ben Stone and Robin Candy. To produce screenshots, a camera was set up to directly capture the television set or monitor that the Spectrum was plugged into. The film was then processed in-house, printed and delivered to a local print shop to prepare the final page.

The first issue was intended to be published in November 1983, in time for the pre-Christmas trade, but owing to a conflict with retailers WH Smith it was published in February the following year. The magazine maintained focus squarely on Spectrum gaming. It was an instant hit thanks to Oliver Frey's artwork and Kean's writing, assisted by Uffindel. Kean and the Frey brothers would continue to be involved with the magazine throughout its lifetime.

Reviewers would give their direct opinions on whether a game was good or not, regardless of advertising or any pressure from software houses. Though publishers sometimes tried to bribe the magazine editors to give games good reviews, the children would not do that, and once gave a game a low score of 9%. This honesty gave Crash a good reputation and made it highly influential in the games industry. If a game was awarded a "Crash Smash" (an overall rating of 90% or above), the industry believed it was genuinely good and it would sell well. The logo was used in advertisements for games, big and small. Notable Crash Smashes included Jet Set Willy, Sabre Wulf and Head over Heels. In 1986, Gremlin Graphics published a compilation, Four Crash Smashes, which featured Spy Hunter, Alien 8, Dun Darach and Night Gunner.

In October 1986, Crash reported sales of over 100,000 copies. Its ABC figure of 101,483 copies a month for the period of January to June were claimed by the magazine to be higher than any other British computer magazine.

By 1989, rival Spectrum magazine Your Sinclair regularly came with a free cassette attached to the cover that contained a complete game and various demos. Crash had occasionally featured cassettes on the cover, but began to lag in circulation. It was relaunched that June with a free cover-mounted cassette with a number of complete games, which continued as a regular feature. This came at the expense of page count and editorial content, both of which were reduced. Kean was annoyed by having to put tapes on the cover to keep up with the competition, as it increased costs and obscured Frey's cover artwork.

Newsfield was suffering increasing financial difficulties by the early 1990s. The last edition of Crash published by the company was in September 1991. Following the company's liquidation, the magazine was relaunched by Europress that December, continuing until the final issue in April 1992. After this, Crash was bought by EMAP, publisher of Sinclair User, who merged the two magazines. In practice, this meant little more than the appearance of the Crash logo on the front cover.

In May 2016, No. 2 King Street, Ludlow was awarded a Blue plaque as the premises of Newsfield while it was publishing Crash and ZZap!64 from 1984–9, which both hired pupils from Ludlow Church of England School alongside professional journalists.

In 2017, the magazine was commemorated in a special exhibition in Ludlow Buttercross Museum documenting Newsfield's contribution to the local industry. The same year, a special edition of the magazine was issued following a Kickstarter campaign that raised £12,000. Kean, Oliver Frey and Nick Roberts all returned to contribute to this issue. The following year, a similar campaign led to the 2019 Crash annual – issue 100.

== Cover art ==
The July 1985 cover caused controversy and was placed on the top shelf of some newsagents.

Crash featured distinctive cover art, mostly drawn by Oliver Frey. Much of his work was published in book form for the first time in 2006.

The cover of issue 18, July 1985, which depicted a scantily clad sorceress with a man on his knees in collar and chains, was considered provocative by some shops who moved it to the top shelf. Issue 31 in August 1986 was criticised for the front cover featuring staff writer Hannah Smith in a swimsuit mud wrestling with an alien. The cover of issue 41, June 1987, was a particularly violent image depicting two barbarians fighting, with one about to slit the throat of another. The picture was deemed too strong by W H Smith and that issue was relegated to the top shelves. However, these controversial covers helped boost the sales of Crash, particularly doubling the circulation from 1985 to 1986.

== Editorial content ==
Much editorial content (such as previews and responses to readers' letters) was credited to Lloyd Mangram, a fictional character, although written by members of the editorial staff. He was created by the team simply to make the magazine look more important and professional by appearing to have a greater number of writers, and named after golfer Lloyd Mangrum. On one occasion, Mangram was depicted visually in the magazine by a sketch of a man wearing a paper bag over his head with holes cut for eyes, and was reported to work on a Hermes typewriter.

The "Playing Tips" section featured solutions to games, and cheats to make them easier. Candy was a regular host of this section in its early years. Issue 27 in April 1986 included a special "Robin Candy's Playing Tips" supplement of cheats and game modifications, including a room editor for the Crash Smash game Sweevo's World. Following Candy's departure, Hannah Smith ran the section as a self-styled "girlie tipster", establishing a rivalry with fictional Melissa Ravenflame from Computer and Video Games. Nick Roberts began his role in the magazine editing this section after Smith, and stayed for the remainder of its run, working out POKEs (alterations to the game's machine code in memory that allowed a player to cheat) using a Multiface, a Spectrum hardware add-on. The magazine also covered technical information and stories about future hardware and peripherals in its "Tech Niche" and "Tech Tips" sections, the latter frequently written by Simon N Goodwin. In 1988, a special "Tech Tape" was released, containing utilities and programs associated with this section. Crash included the occasional column which seemed unusual for a computer magazine. Its first year saw the launch of both the Lunar Jetman strip (written and illustrated by John Richardson, based on the character from the games by Ultimate Play the Game) and The Terminal Man, an original piece of fiction written by Kelvin Gosnell and illustrated by Oliver Frey. Later years would see a brief revival of The Terminal Man, as well as Mel Croucher's comic story Tamara Knight, both of which ended mid-run. After the closure of Newsfield's short-lived lifestyle magazine LM, Crash inherited its video reviews for a short period.

The August 1985 issue of Crash featured "Unclear User", a spoof on rival magazine Sinclair User. This led to a successful injunction being taken out against the magazine two days before the official publication date on the grounds of copyright infringement. Copies were withdrawn from newsagents and an apology published in the following issue. Readers were also offered a back issue with the offending pages removed at a reduced price and priority delivery.

== Readers awards ==
Starting in 1984, the magazine published an annual readers awards article, based on votes from the readers.

Winning games
Year	Best overall game	Best adventure	Best platformer	Best shooter	Best simulation	Best graphics	Best advert
1984	Daley Thompson's Decathlon	Lords of Midnight	Wanted: Monty Mole	Ad Astra	Fighter Pilot		Sabre Wulf
1985	Elite	Red Moon (Time and Magik)	Dynamite Dan	Commando	Tomahawk	Fairlight	
1986	Starglider	Heavy on the Magick	Dynamite Dan II	Uridium	TT Racer	Lightforce	The Great Escape
1987	Driller	The Pawn	Auf Wiedersehen Monty	Zynaps	Gunship	Driller	Game Over
1989	Batman – The Movie	Myth: History in the Making				Operation Thunderbolt	Cabal
1990	RoboCop 2	Lords of Chaos				Turtles	

== See also ==
- Zzap!64, sister magazine focusing on the Commodore 64
- Amtix, sister magazine focusing on the Amstrad CPC
