= List of Commodore 64 games (N–Z) =

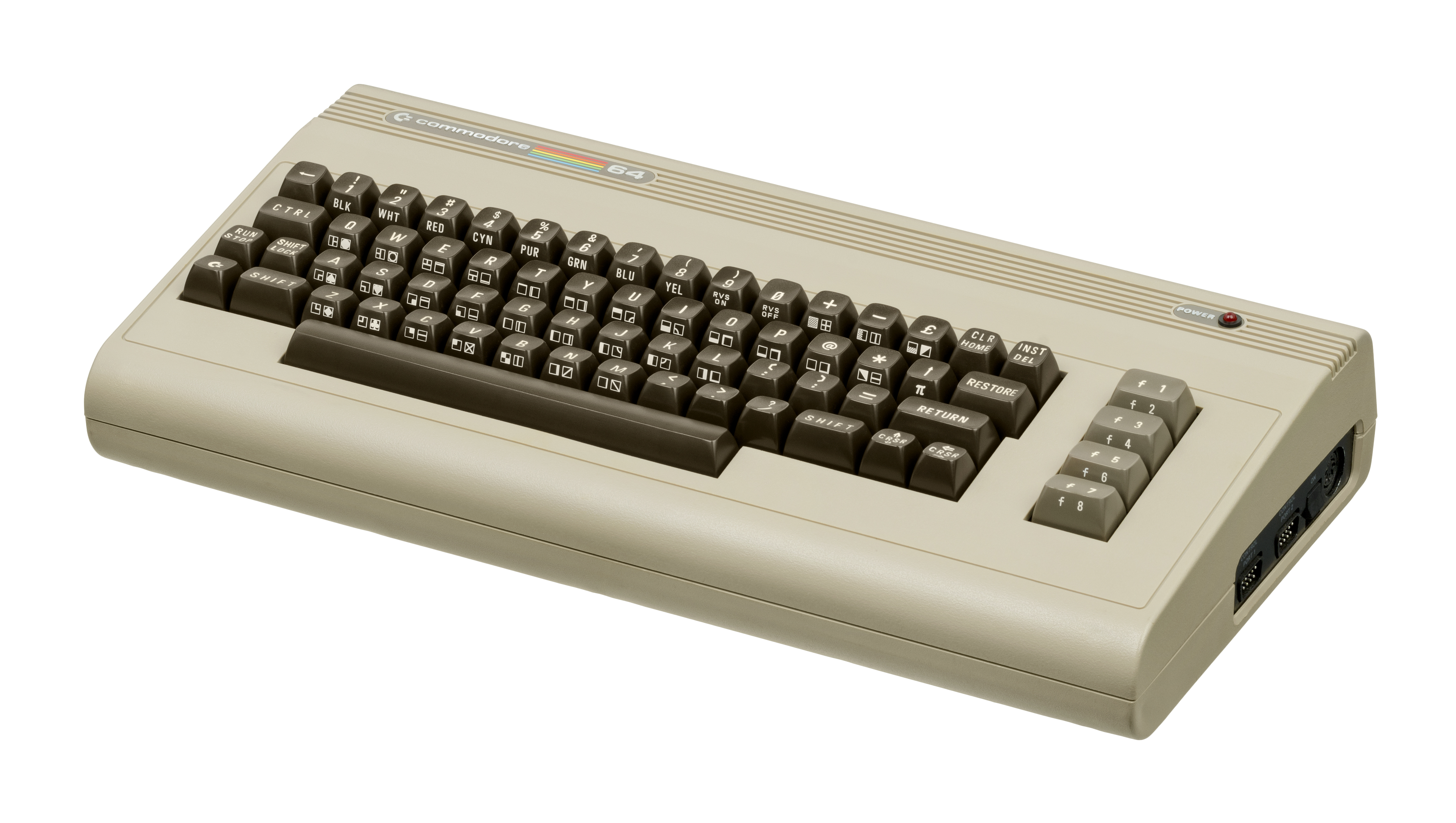
The Commodore 64

This is a list of game titles released for the Commodore 64 personal computer system, sorted alphabetically.

== N ==
- NARC
- NATO Commander
- Nautilus
- Navy SEALS
- Nebulus
- Necromancer
- Nemesis
- Nemesis: The Warlock
- Neptune's Daughters
- Nether Earth
- Netherworld
- Neuromancer
- Neutral Zone
- New York City
- The NewZealand Story
- Newcomer
- Nexus
- Night Driver
- Night Shift
- A Nightmare on Elm Street
- Nightshade
- Nine Princes In Amber
- Ninja
- Ninja Commando
- Ninja Gaiden
- Ninja Hamster
- Ninja Master
- Ninja Rabbits
- Ninja Spirit
- The Ninja Warriors
- Nobby the Aardvark
- Nodes of Yesod
- Nonterraqueous
- Nord and Bert Couldn't Make Head or Tail of It
- North & South
- NorthStar
- Norway 1985
- Nosferatu the Vampyre

== O ==
- Octapolis
- Odell Lake
- Oil Barons
- Oil's Well
- Oink!
- Olli & Lissa 3
- Ollie's Follies
- Omega
- Omega Race
- On The Moon
- On-Court Tennis
- One Man and His Droid
- One on One: Dr. J vs. Larry Bird
- Operation Thunderbolt
- Operation Wolf
- Oregon
- OsWALD
- Out of this World
- Out Run
- Out Run Europa
- Outlaws
- Overlander
- Overlord
- Overrun!

== P ==
- P. P. Hammer and his Pneumatic Weapon
- Pac-Land
- Pac-Man
- Pac-Mania
- Painterboy
- Pandora
- Panic
- Pang (also known as Buster Bros.)
- Panther
- Panzer Strike
- Paperboy
- Paperboy 2
- Paradroid
- Paragon
- Parallax
- The Paranoia Complex
- Paratroopers
- Park Patrol
- Pastfinder
- Patton Versus Rommel
- The Pawn
- PC Fuzz
- Pedro
- Penetrator
- Pengo
- Periscope Up
- Perry Mason: The Case of the Mandarin Murder
- Perseus and Andromeda
- Persian Gulf Inferno
- Peter Pack Rat
- Peter Shilton's Handball Maradona
- Phantasie
- Phantasie II
- Phantasie III
- Phantom of the Asteroid
- The Pharaoh's Curse
- Pharaoh's Revenge
- PHM Pegasus
- Phobia
- Pilgrim
- Pinball Construction Set
- Pinball Wizard (1984 video game)
- Pink Panther
- Pipe Mania
- Piracy
- Pirate Adventure
- Pirates
- Pit-Fighter
- Pitfall!
- Pitfall II: Lost Caverns
- Pitstop
- Pitstop II
- Planet X2
- Planetfall
- Platoon
- Plotting
- Plundered Hearts
- Pogo Joe
- Pole Position
- Pole Position II
- Police Cadet
- Pool of Radiance
- Pooyan
- PopMan
- Popeye
- Portal
- Poster Paster
- Postman Pat
- Postman Pat II
- Postman Pat III
- Pot Panic
- Potty Painter
- Potty Pigeon
- Power At Sea
- Power Drift
- Power!
- Predator
- President Elect
- The President Is Missing
- Press Your Luck
- Presumed Guilty!
- The Price Is Right
- Prince of Persia
- Pro Boxing Simulator
- Pro Tennis Tour
- Professional Ski Simulator
- Project Firestart
- Project Space Station
- Project Stealth Fighter
- Proof of Destruction
- Psi-5 Trading Company
- PSI Warrior
- Psycho Hopper
- Psycho Soldier
- Pub Games
- Pub Trivia
- Puffy's Saga
- Punchy
- Purple Turtles
- Puzzle Panic
- Puzzlenoid
- Puzznic
- Pyjamarama
- The Pyramid

== Q ==
- Q*bert
- Qix
- Quake Minus One
- Quango
- Quartet
- Quasimodo
- Quedex
- The Quest
- A Question of Sport
- Questron
- Quo Vadis

== R ==
- R-Type
- Racing Destruction Set
- Rack 'Em
- Radar Rat Race
- Ralph Bosson's High Seas
- Rags to Riches
- Raid on Bungeling Bay
- Raid over Moscow
- Rainbow Islands
- Rail Boss
- The Railroad Works
- Rally Cross Simulator
- Rally Racer
- Rally Speedway
- Rambo
- Rambo III
- Rampage
- Rampart
- Ranarama
- Rasputin
- Rastan Saga
- Rasterscan
- The Rats
- Ratsplat
- RDF 1985
- Reach for the Stars
- Reader Rabbit
- The Real Ghostbusters
- Realm of Impossibility
- Realms of Darkness
- Rebel Planet
- Rebounder
- Red Arrows
- Red Heat
- Red Max
- Red Storm Rising
- Renaissance
- Rendezvous with Rama
- Renegade
- Renegade III: The Final Chapter
- Repton (Sirius Software)
- Repton (Superior Software)
- Rescue on Fractalus!
- Rescue Squad
- Return of the Mutant Camels
- Revenge of the Mutant Camels
- Revs
- Revs+
- Rick Dangerous
- Rick Dangerous 2
- Richard Petty's Talladega
- Ricochet
- Rigel's Revenge
- Ring of Power
- Risk
- River Raid
- River Rescue
- Road to Moscow
- Road Raider
- Road Runner
- RoadBlasters
- Roadwar 2000
- Roadwars
- Robbers of the Lost Tomb
- Robin to the Rescue
- Robin Hood
- Robin Hood: Legend Quest
- Robin Smith's International Cricket
- Robin of the Wood
- RoboCop
- RoboCop 2
- RoboCop 3
- Robot Rascals
- Robotfindskitten
- Robotron: 2084
- Rock'n Wrestle
- Rock'n Bolt
- Rock'n Roll
- Rock Star Ate My Hamster
- Rocket Ranger
- Rocketball
- The Rocky Horror Show
- Rockford
- Rocky's Boots
- Rod Land
- Rogue
- Rogue Trooper
- Roland's Rat Race
- Rollaround
- Roller Coaster Rumbler
- Rolling Ronnie
- Rolling Thunder
- Rotor Rampge
- Rubicon
- Rugby: The World Cup
- The Running Man
- Run the Gauntlet
- Rupert and the Ice Castle
- Rupert and the Toymaker's Party
- Rush'n Attack (also known as Green Beret)
- Rygar

== S ==
- S.T.U.N. Runner
- Sabotage
- Saboteur
- Saboteur II: Avenging Angel
- Sabre Wulf
- The Sacred Armour of Antiriad
- Saint Dragon
- Salamander
- Samantha Fox Strip Poker
- Sammy Lightfoot
- Samurai Trilogy
- Samurai Warrior: The Battles of Usagi Yojimbo
- Sanxion
- Saracen
- Sargon II
- Sargon III
- SAS Combat Simulator
- Saucer Attack
- Savage
- Savage Pond
- Save New York
- Scapeghost
- Scarabaeus
- Scooby-Doo
- Scooby-Doo and Scrappy-Doo
- Scramble Spirits
- The Secret Diary of Adrian Mole, Aged 13¾
- Scramble
- SDI
- Se-Kaa of Assiah
- Seabase Delta
- Seafox
- Search for the Titanic
- Seastalker
- The Secret of Bastow Manor
- Secret of the Silver Blades
- Sentinel Worlds I: Future Magic
- The Sentinel
- The Serpent's Star
- Serpentine
- Seven Cities of Gold
- Seymour Goes to Hollywood
- Shackled
- Shadow Dancer
- Shadow Fighter
- Shadow of the Beast
- Shadowfire
- Shadows of Mordor
- Shamus
- Shamus Case II
- Shanghai
- Shanghai Karate
- Shao-Lin's Road
- Shard of Spring
- Sheep in Space
- Sherlock: The Riddle of the Crown Jewels
- Sherwood
- Shinobi
- Shockway Rider
- Shoot'Em-Up Construction Kit
- Short Circuit
- Side Arms
- Sidewize
- Sierra Championship Boxing
- Sigma 7
- The Simpsons: Bart vs. the Space Mutants
- The Simpsons Arcade Game
- Silent Service
- Silicon Dreams
- Silkworm
- SimCity
- Sinbad and the Throne of the Falcon
- Siren City
- Skate Crazy
- Skate or Die!
- Skateball
- Skaterock
- Ski or Die
- Skool Daze
- Skramble
- Sky Runner
- Sky Shark
- Skyfox
- Skyfox II: The Cygnus Conflict
- Slamball
- Slap Fight
- Slap Shot
- Slayer
- Sleepwalker
- Slicks
- Slightly Magic
- Slime
- Sly Spy
- Smash TV
- Snare
- Snokie
- Snooker
- Snoopy
- Soccer Boss
- Soft Aid
- Software Star
- Soldier of Fortune
- Solo Flight
- Solomon's Key
- Son of Blagger
- Sonic the Hedgehog
- Sorcerer
- Sorcerer Lord
- Soul of a Robot
- Southern Belle
- Space Action
- Space Gun
- Space Harrier
- Space Harrier II
- Space Pilot
- Space Pilot II
- Space Rogue
- Space Taxi
- Special Criminal Investigation
- Speed King
- Speedball
- Speedball 2
- Spellbound
- Spellbound Dizzy
- Spellbreaker
- Spelunker
- Spider-Man and Captain America in Doctor Doom's Revenge
- Spike's Peak
- Spiky Harold
- Spindizzy
- Spirit of Adventure
- Spirit of the Stones
- Spitfire 40
- Spitfire Ace
- Spitting Image
- Splat!
- Split Personalities
- Spooks
- Spore
- Sport of Kings
- Sporting Triangles
- Spriteman
- Spy Hunter
- Spy vs. Spy
- Spy vs. Spy II: The Island Caper
- Spy vs. Spy III: Arctic Antics
- The Spy Who Loved Me
- Spy's Demise
- Sqij!
- Squirm
- Squish 'em
- The Staff of Karnath
- Stalag 23
- The Standing Stones
- Star Control
- Star Fire
- Star Fleet I: The War Begins
- Star League Baseball
- Star Lifter
- Star Paws
- Star Raiders II
- Star Soldier
- Star Trader
- Star Trek
- Star Trek: The Kobayashi Alternative
- Star Trek: The Promethean Prophecy
- Star Trek: The Rebel Universe
- Star Wars (1983)
- Star Wars (Domark)
- Star Wars: Return of the Jedi
- Star Wars: The Empire Strikes Back
- Star Wreck
- Starcross
- Starflight
- Starfox
- Stargate
- Starglider
- Starquake
- Stationfall
- Steel
- Steel Thunder
- Steg
- Stellar 7
- Stifflip & Co.
- Stir Crazy featuring BoBo
- Stix
- Stock Car
- Stop the Express
- Storm
- Storm Warrior
- Stormbringer
- Stormlord
- Stormtrooper
- Strangeloop
- Strange Odyssey
- Streaker
- Street Beat
- Street Fighter
- Street Fighter II: The World Warrior
- Street Hawk
- Street Sports Baseball
- Street Sports Basketball
- Streets of London
- Street Rod
- Street Rod 2
- Street Surfer
- Strider
- Strider II
- Strike
- Strike Fleet
- Strike Force Harrier
- Strip Poker
- Strip Poker II
- Striker
- Stunt Car Racer
- Sub Battle Simulator
- Subbuteo
- Subsunk
- Subterranea
- Suicide Express
- Summer Games
- Summer Games II
- Super Bowl 1986
- Super Bowl Sunday
- Super Bunny
- Super Cars
- Super Cars II
- Super Cycle
- Super Gran
- Super Gran: The Adventure
- Super Gridder
- Super Hang-On
- Super Huey
- Super Huey II
- Super Monaco GP
- Super OsWALD
- Super Pac-Man
- Super Password
- Super Pipeline
- Super Pipeline II
- Super Robin Hood
- Super Scramble Simulator
- Super Skramble!
- Super Space Invaders
- Super Spring
- Super Sprint
- Super Sprint II
- Super Trolley
- The SuperCan
- Superman: The Game
- Superman: The Man of Steel
- Superstar Ice Hockey
- Supremacy
- Survivors
- Suspect
- Suspended
- S.W.A.T.
- SWIV
- Swoop
- Sword of Fargoal
- Sword of Fred
- Sword of Honour
- The Sword of Kadash
- Synetic
- System 15000

== T ==
- T.A.N.K.
- Tag Team Wrestling
- Tai-Pan
- Tales of Lore
- Tales of the Arabian Nights
- Tapper
- Targ
- Target Renegade
- Task III
- Tass Times in Tonetown
- Tau Ceti
- Techno Cop
- Teenage Mutant Ninja Turtles
- Teenage Mutant Ninja Turtles II: The Arcade Game
- Telengard
- Temple of Apshai
- Terra Cresta
- Terrormolinos
- Test Drive
- Test Drive II
- Terra Quest
- Terry's Big Adventure
- Terminator 2: Judgment Day
- Test Master
- Thanatos
- The NeverEnding Story
- The Quest for the Golden Egg Cup
- Theatre Europe
- They Stole A Million
- Thing On A Spring
- Thing Bounces Back
- Thomas the Tank Engine and Friends
- The Thompson Twins Adventure
- The Three Stooges
- Three Weeks in Paradise
- Thrust
- Thrust II
- Thud Ridge: American Aces In 'Nam
- Thunderbirds
- Thunder Blade
- Thundercats
- ThunderJaws
- Tie Break
- Tiger Road
- Tilt
- Time and Magik
- Time Pilot
- Timesearch
- Times of Lore
- Time Tunnel
- Tintin on the Moon
- Tir Na Nog
- Titan
- Tom & Jerry
- To Hell and Back
- Tomcat
- Tony La Russa Baseball
- Toobin
- Tooth Invaders
- Top Gun
- Total Eclipse
- Total Recall
- Toy Bizarre
- Track & Field
- Tracksuit Manager
- Trailblazer
- The Train: Escape to Normandy
- Train Robbers
- Trans World
- The Transformers
- Transformers: The Battle to Save the Earth
- Transylvania
- Transylvania III: Vanquish The Night
- Trantor: The Last Stormtrooper
- The Trap Door
- Trashman
- TRAZ
- Treasure Island
- Treasure Island Dizzy
- Triton
- Trollie Wallie
- Troll's Tale
- Trolls and Tribulations
- Troy It!
- Tuk's Adventure
- Turbo 64
- Turbo Esprit
- Turbo Outrun
- Turbo the Tortoise
- Turmoil (1982 video game)
- Turn It
- Turrican
- Turrican II: The Final Fight
- TV Sports Football
- Twin Kingdom Valley
- Twinworld
- Type Attack

== U ==
- Uchi Mata
- U.N. Squadron
- Ugh!
- Ultima I: The First Age of Darkness
- Ultima II: The Revenge of the Enchantress
- Ultima III: Exodus
- Ultima IV: Quest of the Avatar
- Ultima V: Warriors of Destiny
- Ultima VI: The False Prophet
- Ultimate Wizard
- Ulysses and the Golden Fleece
- Under Fire!
- Underwurlde
- Uninvited
- Unitrax
- Up'n Down
- Up Periscope
- Urban Upstart
- Uridium
- Uridium Plus
- Uuno Turhapuro muuttaa maalle

== V ==
- V
- Valhalla
- The Valley
- Vampire
- Vendetta
- Victory Road
- Video Meanies
- A View to a Kill
- Vigilante
- Viking Raider
- Vikings
- Vindicators
- Vixen
- Viz: The Game
- Volfied
- Voodoo Castle
- Vultures

== W ==
- W.A.R.
- Wanted: Monty Mole
- War in Middle Earth
- War of the Lance
- Wargame Construction Set
- Warhawk
- Warrior II
- Wasteland
- Water Polo
- Waterline
- Wavy Navy
- Waxworks
- The Way of the Exploding Fist
- Way of the Tiger
- Way of the Tiger II: Avenger
- Wayout
- WEC Le Mans
- Weird Dreams
- Welltris
- Werewolves of London
- Wheel of Fortune
- Wheeling Wallie
- Where in the U.S.A. is Carmen Sandiego?
- Where in the World is Carmen Sandiego?
- Where in Time is Carmen Sandiego?
- White Water
- Who Dares Wins
- Who Dares Wins II
- Who Framed Roger Rabbit
- Wicked
- William Wobbler
- Windwalker, (Moebius II)
- Wings of Fury
- Winnie the Pooh in the Hundred Acre Wood
- Winter Games
- Wishbringer
- The Witness
- Wizard
- Wizard and the Princess
- Wizard of Wor
- Wizard Warz
- Wizard's Crown
- Wizardry
- Wizardry II: The Knight of Diamonds
- Wizardry III: Legacy of Llylgamyn
- Wizardry V: Heart of the Maelstrom
- Wizardry: Proving Grounds of the Mad Overlord
- Wizball
- Wolfman
- Wonder Boy
- Wonder Boy in Monster Land
- Wooden Ships and Iron Men
- Woody The Worm
- World Championship Boxing Manager
- World Championship Soccer
- World Class Leaderboard
- World Cup 90: Arcade Soccer
- World Cup Carnival
- World Cup Cricket (1985 video game)
- World Cup Football (1984 video game)
- World Cup Italia '90
- World Cup Soccer (1985 video game)
- World Cup Soccer: Italia '90
- World Games
- World Karate Champion
- World of Pirates
- World Rugby
- World Tour Golf
- Worms?
- Wrath of Denethor
- Wrath of the Demon
- WWF European Rampage Tour
- WWF WrestleMania

== X ==
- X-Men: Madness in Murderworld
- X-Out
- Xenomorph
- Xenon
- Xenophobe
- Xevious
- XOR
- Xyphus
- Xzap

== Y ==
- Yatzy
- Yes, Prime Minister
- Yie Ar Kung-Fu
- Yie Ar Kung-Fu II
- Yogi Bear
- Yogi's Great Escape
- The Young Ones

== Z ==
- Z
- Zak McKracken and the Alien Mindbenders
- Zamzara
- Zaxxon
- Zeppelin
- Zig Zag
- Zim Sala Bim
- Zoids: The Battle Begins
- Zolo
- Zombi
- Zone Ranger
- Zone Six
- Zoom!
- Zork I
- Zork II - The Wizard of Frobozz
- Zork III - The Dungeon Master
- Zork: The Undiscovered Underground
- Zorro
- Zub
- Zuul
- Zybex
- Zynaps
- Zzzzz

== See also ==
- List of Commodore 64 games
- List of Commodore 64 games (A–M)
