= Wizard =

Wizard, the wizard, or wizards most often refers to:

- Wizard (fantasy), a fictional practitioner of magic
- Wizard (supernatural), a practitioner of magic

Wizard, the wizard, or wizards may also refer to:

== Arts, entertainment and media ==
=== Fictional characters ===
- Wizard (Archie Comics), a comic book superhero
- Wizard (character class), magic-wielding character types in many role-playing games
- Wizard (DC Comics), a comic book villain
- Wizard (Dungeons & Dragons), the Dungeons & Dragons character class
- Wizard (Marvel Comics), a comic book villain
- Wizard (Middle-earth), powerful beings in the writings of J. R. R. Tolkien
- "The Wizard", the villain of the serial Batman and Robin
- Wizard of Oz (character), in L. Frank Baum's novel The Wonderful Wizard of Oz and its movie adaptations
- Wizards (Discworld), major characters in Terry Pratchett's Discworld series

=== Film ===
- The Wizard (1927 film), an American silent horror film
- The Wizard (1989 film), an American film about a skilled video gamer
- Wizards (film), a 1977 animated post-apocalyptic fantasy/science fiction film by Ralph Bakshi

=== Gaming ===
- Wizard (1984 video game), a 1984 Commodore 64 game that was later re-released in 1986 as Ultimate Wizard
- Wizard (2005 video game), a game designed by Chris Crawford for the Atari 2600 and released in 2005
- Wizard (board game), 1978, released by Metagaming
- Wizard (card game), a 1984 Canadian trick-taking card game designed by Ken Fisher
- Wizard (MUD), a developer or administrator in a MUD
- Wizards (board game), produced in 1982 by Avalon Hill
- Wizards (Mayfair Games), a 1983 supplement for role-playing games
- Wizards of the Coast or Wizards, a Seattle-based games publisher

=== Literature ===
- Wizard (novel), a 1980 science fiction novel by John Varley
- The Wizard (novel), an 1896 Adventure novel by Henry Rider Haggard
- The Wizard, a novel by Gene Wolfe in the series The Wizard Knight
- Wizards (Ace anthology), 2008, edited by Jack Dann and Gardner Dozois
- Wizards (Asimov anthology), 1983, edited by Isaac Asimov
- The Wizard (D.C. Thomson), 1922–1963, story paper published by D.C. Thomson & Co.

=== Music ===
==== Groups ====
- Wizzard, a British glam rock band
- Wizard (German band), a German power metal/speed metal band
- Wizard (American band), a short-lived American psychedelic/hard rock band
- WZRD (band), alternative rock duo formerly known as Wizard

==== Albums ====
- Wizard (EP), by Beto Vázquez Infinity
- The Wizard (album), the second album by American blues guitarist Mel Brown
- WZRD (album), the eponymous debut album by American alternative rock duo WZRD
- The Wizrd, the seventh studio album by American rapper Future
- Oṣó (Yoruba: The Wizard), the sixth studio album by Nigerian singer Brymo
- The Wizard, working title of T. Rex (album) by Marc Bolan's band T.Rex which contained a reworking of his below solo single

==== Songs ====
- "The Wizard" (Black Sabbath song), 1970
- "The Wizard" (Paul Hardcastle song), 1986
- "The Wizard" (Uriah Heep song), 1972
- "Wizard" (Martin Garrix and Jay Hardway song), 2013
- "The Wizard", a song by Bat for Lashes from Fur and Gold
- "The Wizard", a song by Albert Ayler from Spiritual Unity
- "The Wizard", a single by Marc Bolan
- "The Wizard", a song by Paul Espinoza of Golden Bough
- "The Wizard", a song by Al Di Meola from Land of the Midnight Sun
- "The Wizard", a song by Madness from Wonderful

==== Other uses in music ====
- Wizard, an Australian record label created by Robie Porter

=== Television ===
- The Wizard (TV series), a short-lived 1980s CBS television series
- Wizards: Tales of Arcadia, a 2020 TV series
- Wizards, the working title of Wizards Beyond Waverly Place, an American comedy series
- "Wizard" (Adventure Time episode)
- "the wizard" (Barry), an episode of the series Barry
- "The Wizard" (Seinfeld), the 171st episode of the NBC sitcom Seinfeld
- "The Wizard", an episode of She-Ra: Princess of Power

=== Other uses in arts, entertainment and media ===
- Wizard (magazine), about comic books
- The Wizard (DC Thomson), a British comic that featured Wilson of the Wizard and was merged to Rover

== People ==
- The Wizard (nickname), a list of people nicknamed "the Wizard" or "Wizard"
- Mr. Wizard, the creator and host of Watch Mr. Wizard and Mr. Wizard's World
- Wizard of New Zealand, also known as The Wizard, New Zealand educator, comedian and politician Ian Brackenbury Channell (born 1932)
- The Wizard, a ring name of King Curtis Iaukea (1937–2010), professional wrestler and manager
- The Wizard, a ring name of Kevin Sullivan (wrestler) (1949–2024), professional wrestler and manager

== Science and technology ==
- HTC Wizard, a QWERTY-keyboard pocket PC
- Sharp Wizard, a personal organizer released in 1988
- Wizard (software), a computer user interface that leads a user through dialog steps
- Wizard butterfly, the brush-footed or Bardic wizard butterfly Rhinopalpa polynice
- Wizard Nebula, an open cluster in the constellation Cepheus

== Sports ==
- Wizard (horse) (1806–1813), a Thoroughbred racehorse
- Canterbury cricket team, known as the Wizards
- Dakota Wizards, a team in the NBA Development League
- Fort Wayne Wizards, a team in the Midwest League of professional baseball
- Kansas City Wizards, the former name of Sporting Kansas City, a Major League Soccer team
- Washington Wizards, a National Basketball Association team
- Yomiuri Open, a golf tournament in Japan known as the Wizard between 1970 and 1978

== Transport ==
- Hillman Wizard, an American six-cylinder car
- Isuzu Wizard, a Japanese mid-size SUV
- Wizard, a GWR Iron Duke Class steam locomotive
- Laron Wizard, an American homebuilt aircraft design

== Other uses ==
- HMS Wizard, a list of ships bearing the name
- FV Wizard, a crab fishing boat in the TV show Deadliest Catch
- Wizard Video, a defunct home video company

== See also ==
- Grand Wizard or Imperial Wizard, a leader of the Ku Klux Klan
- Comp wizard, also known as a Comp hustler, is a gambler who maximizes complementary perqs from casinos
- The Wizzard, Dominican calypso singer
- Wizzard, a 1970s British glam rock band
- Wizard Cup (disambiguation)
- WZRD (disambiguation)
- Wizardry (disambiguation)
