= Spook =

Spook is a synonym for ghost. Spook or spooks may also refer to:

== People ==
- Spook (nickname), shared by several notable people
- Per Spook (born 1939), Norwegian fashion designer
- A racial slur referring to a black person
- A colloquial name for a spy in spy fiction

== Places ==
- Spook Bridge, an abandoned bridge over the Withlacoochee River, Georgia, US
- Spook Cave, a flooded cave in Iowa, US
- Spook Hill, a gravity hill in Florida, US
- Spook (crater), a small crater in the Descartes Highlands of the Moon

== Arts, entertainment, media ==
=== Fictional characters ===
- Spook (comics), a DC Comics enemy of Batman
- Spook, a character from the cartoon series Top Cat
- Spook, a character in the comic strip The Wizard of Id

=== Films ===
- Spooks (1930 film), a 1930 Oswald the Lucky Rabbit short
- Spooks (1931 film), a 1931 Flip the Frog short
- Spooks (1953 film), a 1953 Three Stooges short
- Spooks: The Greater Good, a British 2015 spy film

=== Literature and comics ===
- Spook: Science Tackles the Afterlife, a 2005 non-fiction book by Mary Roach
- Spook's, a series of dark fantasy novels by Joseph Delaney
- Spook, a graphic novel by Joshua Starnes and Lisandro Estherren
- Spooks, a children's book by Colin and Jacqui Hawkins as part of their Picture Lions series
- Spooks, a comic book series by Larry Hama

=== Television ===
- Spooks (TV series), a UK series broadcast from 2002 to 2011 (called MI-5 in some countries)
- Spooks: Code 9, a UK series broadcast in 2008

=== Music ===
==== Groups ====
- Spooks (group), an American hip-hop band

==== Albums ====
- Spooks (album), 2010, by The Beautiful Girls
- Spooks: Original Comics Soundtrack, 2008, by Lalo Schifrin and Andy Garfield, based on the comics by Larry Hama

==== Songs ====
- "Spooks", by Dance Gavin Dance from the album Downtown Battle Mountain II
- "Spooks", by Jonny Greenwood (Radiohead) from the Inherent Vice soundtrack
- "Spooks!", by Louis Armstrong, released in 1954, later found on album Satchmo In Style
- "Spooks", by Marion Brown from the album Three for Shepp 1966
- "Spooks", by Pryda from the single Spooks / Do It
- "Spook", by Black Rebel Motorcycle Club from the album Wrong Creatures

=== Other arts, entertainment, and media ===
- Spooks (video game), 1985

== Military ==
- A Mine Protected Combat Vehicle, a Rhodesian armoured fighting vehicle, nicknamed "Spook"
- "The Spook", emblem of the McDonnell Douglas F-4 Phantom II, a US Navy fighter-bomber

== Other uses ==
- A concept in the philosophy of Max Stirner

== See also ==
- Spooked (disambiguation)
- Spooky (disambiguation)
- Secret agent (disambiguation)
- Espionage
