= Time Tunnel =

Time Tunnel(s) may refer to:

- The Time Tunnel, an American science fiction television series
- Time Tunnel (museum), a memorabilia museum in Malaysia
- Time Tunnel (video), a video retrospective of the band Living Colour
- Time Tunnel (1982 video game), a 1982 video game by Taito
- Time Tunnel (1985 video game), a 1985 video game
- Time Tunnels, a 1981 board game
