= Talladega =

Talladega may refer to:

== Places in Alabama, United States ==
- Talladega County, Alabama
  - Talladega, Alabama, a city and the county seat
    - Talladega Superspeedway, motorsports complex in the city
    - Talladega College, liberal arts college
- Talladega National Forest

== Other uses ==
- Battle of Talladega, fought between the Tennessee militia and the Red Stick Creek Indians during the Creek War
- Saab 900 Talladega, a 1997 sport-styled limited edition of the Saab 900 (NG), to commemorate the records achieved at the Talladega Superspeedway with that model the year before
- Ford Torino Talladega, a 1969 automobile produced by the Ford Motor Company, named after the racetrack
- USS Talladega (APA-208), a Haskell-class attack transport ship of the United States Navy
- Richard Petty's Talladega (also sold as Richard Petty's Rennzirkus in Germany, and as Talladega), a 1980s car racing video game
- "Talladega" (song), a song by Eric Church

== See also ==
- Talladega Nights: The Ballad of Ricky Bobby, a 2006 American comedy film about NASCAR racing
