= Wizardry =

Wizardry may refer to:

- Wizardry (video game series), role-playing video game series, originally developed and published by Sir-Tech
  - Wizardry: Proving Grounds of the Mad Overlord, the first game in the series, released in 1981
- Wizardry (The Edge), 1985 adventure game published by The Edge
- Magic (supernatural)
  - Witchcraft, the use of supernatural powers of magic
  - Magic (fantasy)

== See also ==
- Sorcery
- Wizard
