= Into Oblivion =

Into Oblivion may refer to:

- "Into Oblivion (Reunion)", a song by Funeral for a Friend
- Into Oblivion (Lamb of God album), a 2026 album by Lamb of God
- Into Oblivion, an album by Rise and Fall
- Into Oblivion (Venom album), a 2026 album by Venom
- Into Oblivion (video game), a 1986 computer game for the Amstrad CPC, Commodore 64 and ZX Spectrum
