= Leonard Richardson =

Leonard Richardson is a personal name that may refer to:

- Leonard Richardson (Math Faculty at LSU). See Louisiana State University
- Leon Richardson (born 12 February 1957), Antiguan former cyclist
- Len Richardson (athlete) (1881–1955), South African long-distance runner
- Leonard Richardson (decathlete), Saint Kitts and Nevis. Bronze Medal winner at the 1986 Pan American Junior Athletics Championships
- Leonard Richardson (industrialist), father of Milo Barnum Richardson
- Leonard Richardson (video game developer). See Resource-oriented architecture, robotfindskitten
