= Snooker (disambiguation) =

Snooker is a cue sport, that is played on a green baize-covered table with pockets in each of the four corners and in the middle of each of the long side cushions.

Snooker may also refer to:

== Sport ==
- Six-red snooker
- Snooker plus, a cue sport based on snooker
- Power Snooker, a 2010 variant of the cue sport snooker
- American Snooker, a variation with simplified rules
- Tenball, a version of Snooker with additional rules made for television - presented by Phillip Schofield
- Snooker Shoot Out, a variant of Snooker based on Shot clock rules

== Games ==
- Jimmy White's 'Whirlwind' Snooker, a 1991 computer game
- Snooker (video game), a 1983 sports simulation video game
- Snooker 19, a 2019 sports simulation video game

== People ==
- Morrie Arnovich or "Snooker" (1910–1959), American baseball player
- Mr. Snooker (Joe Davis; 1901–1978), English professional player of snooker and English billiards

== Songs ==
- "Snooker Loopy", a humorous 1986 song by Chas & Dave
- "Snookeroo", an Elton John song from the 1974 Ringo Starr album Goodnight Vienna

== Movies ==
- Hagiga B'Snuker, a 1975 Israeli film originally named Snooker

== See also ==
- Snookered, a term used in cue sports to describe a scenario where one's ball cannot be directly hit with the cue ball without causing a foul
