= Into Oblivion (video game) =

1986 video game

- Developer: Stephen N. Curtis
- Publisher: Mastertronic
- Platform: Amstrad CPC
- Release: 1986
- Genre: Action
- Mode: Single-player

Into Oblivion is a video game written by Stephen N. Curtis and published by Mastertronic in 1986 for the Amstrad CPC.

== Gameplay ==
The story is set in the aftermath of the destruction of an evil computer. Only its servants remain, from the planet Nonterraqueous, a location used by programmer Steven Curtis in the prequels Nonterraqueous (1985) and Soul of a Robot (1985). The player's objective is to find a safe planet amongst the 42 in the system.

The player controls a small vehicle, a "Mk II Seeker", which allows for exploration of the various screens. Joystick or keyboard can be used. The player is supplied with a laser beam to destroy various hazardous lifeforms, and nine lives. Each screen has a group of three enemies that follow different movement patterns. Some screens contain a spacecraft that transports the player to another planet.

== Reception ==
Amstrad Action gave Into Oblivion an overall rating of 70%, highlighting the large number of screens and the exploration and mapping required to find the safe planet. However, the gameplay was criticised for the lack of excitement from obstacles and enemies.

It reached the top of Amstrad charts displacing The Way of the Tiger. After one week at number one it was replaced by another Mastertronic title, The Last V8.
