= Streets of London =

The streets of London are the roads and thoroughfares of London, the capital of the United Kingdom. See Category:Streets in London.

It may also refer to:

- "Streets of London" (song), 1969 song written by Ralph McTell
- Streets of London (computer game), 1983 text adventure
- The Streets of London, a 1906 documentary by Charles Urban
- The Streets of London (1929 film), a British crime film
- The Streets of London (1934 film), an Australian melodrama

== See also ==
- "Dark Streets of London", a song by the Pogues
- London A-Z, a street map
- "The Knowledge" of London streets and routes required of taxi drivers since the 19th century
