= Road to Moscow (cancelled video game) =

- Developer: Battlefield Design Group
- Publishers: Arsenal Publishing; Interactive Magic
- Platforms: Windows; Macintosh
- Release: Cancelled

Road to Moscow is a cancelled video game from Battlefield Design Group. It was described as a spiritual descendant to the 1984 video game of the same name.

== Gameplay ==
Road to Moscow was designed as a strategic-level simulation following the conflict between the Axis Powers and the Soviet Union from 1941 to 1945, with the player as either the German (OKH) or Russian (STAVKA) high command. The game was designed to use simultaneous real time movement for units. The player would plan offensive operations as well as counterattacks, manage the allocation of their forces, and track progress of operations. To launch an attack, the player selects a map area to develop the strategic operation and its primary and secondary objects, choose the participating forces which the game then musters and begins the operation with subordinate officers directing the plans in action. The player would receive reports detailing the levels of the forces, readiness of units, logistics, reports on air superiority, and military intelligence. Units were designed to move freely across the map, rather than by tradition wargame hex movement. The game would be played on a 1:2,000,000 scale topographical map which reaches from the northern ports of Murmansk and Archanglesk to the southern Black Sea coast of Turkey, and from the west of Bosporus and Warsaw to the east of Stalingrad.

== Development ==
The game was originally scheduled to be released in late 1996. In February 1998, Interactive Magic picked up the publishing rights to the game after Arsenal Publishing dropped them in 1997. Phil Gardocki (designer and developer of the original Road to Moscow game) was involved in the project.

The game was later supposed to be released in June 1999, but ultimately was not.
