= Pitstop =

Pitstop may refer to:

- Pit stop, in motor racing, when the car stops in the pits for fuel and other consumables to be renewed or replenished
- Pit Stop (1969 film), a movie directed by Jack Hill
- Pit Stop (2013 film), a movie directed by Yen Tan
- Pitstop (video game), a 1983 computer game by Epyx
- Penelope Pitstop, a cartoon character
- Pit Stop, an album by The Ziggens
