= Speed King (disambiguation) =

Speed King can refer to the following:

== Film ==
- The Speed Kings, a 1913 film featuring Fatty Arbuckle
- Speed Kings (film), a 1915 film featuring Oliver Hardy

== Music ==
- "Speed King", a song by Deep Purple
- "Speed King", a song by Rip Slyme
- "Speed King", a song by Royksopp

== Video Games ==
- Speed King, a 1985 motorbike racing game for the Commodore 64 from Digital Integration
- Speed King, a 1995 arcade and PlayStation game from Konami
- Speed Kings, a 2003 motorbike racing game from Acclaim Entertainment
