= Tikkurila (corporation) =

Finnish manufacturer of paints and lacquers

Tikkurila Oyj
- We Protect & Beautify The World.
- Company type: Julkinen osakeyhtiö (public)
- Founded: 1862
- Headquarters: Vantaa, Finland
- Key people: Meri Vainikka (Managing Director); Michael McGarry (Chairman of the Board)
- Revenue: ▲€ 226.8 million (2021)
- Operating income: ▼€ 10.3 million (2021)
- Net income: ▼€ 35.4 million (2021)
- Number of employees: ▲572 (2021)
- Website: www.tikkurila.com

Tikkurila Oyj is a Finnish manufacturer of paints and lacquers. The main office and most of the production is located in Kuninkaala (neighboring district to Tikkurila), Vantaa near Helsinki.

The company was founded in 1862 as Dickursby Oljeslageri to produce linseed oil and varnish, and was acquired by the Helsinki company Schildt & Hallberg in 1885. As Schildt & Hallberg Oy, it started producing paints in 1919, eventually rising to the position of the largest paint manufacturer in Finland. In 1972, the Finnish chemical conglomerate Kemira (then Rikkihappo Oy) acquired the company, and started the expansion and modernization of the production plant, which was moved a bit further from Tikkurila center; the old plant was demolished in the 1980s. In 1975, it was renamed Tikkurilan Väritehtaat Oy ("Tikkurila Paint Factories"), which was shortened to Tikkurila Oy in 1986. After the collapse of the Soviet Union, Tikkurila successfully expanded into the Baltic and Russian markets, reaching market leader status.

Tikkurila, serving consumers, professional painters, and industrial customers in approximately 40 countries, was separated from Kemira and Tikkurila's shares were listed on NASDAQ OMX Helsinki Ltd in March 2010. Tikkurila's product range consists of decorative paints and coatings for the wood and metal industries. The brands of the Tikkurila paints division are major players in the Nordic countries and even market leaders in Russia.

In 1986, Tikkurila published the ad-game Painterboy for Commodore 64.

On April 19, 2011, Tikkurila acquired the Serbian company Zorka Color d.o.o., forming a company which became known as Tikkurila Zorka d.o.o. On October 27, 2015, the company changed the name to just Tikkurila, d.o.o.

== Brands ==
- Tikkurila (international)
- Beckers (international)
- Alcro (Sweden)
- Vivacolor (Baltic countries)
- Finncolor (Russia — founded by Tikkurila)
- Kraski Teks (Russia — acquired)

== External sources ==
- Official website
