= Your 64 =

British computer magazine

- Issue #1, APR/MAY 1984
- Editor: Bruce Sawford
- Categories: Computer magazine
- Frequency: bi-monthly
- Circulation: 38,012 (circa 1985)
- First issue: April/May 1984
- Final issue Number: October 1985; 14
- Company: Sportscene Specialist Press
- Country: United Kingdom
- Language: English

Your 64 was a British computer magazine aimed at users of the Commodore 64 and VIC-20 home computers, launched by Sportscene Specialist Press in 1984 as a sister title to Your Spectrum. Initially a bi-monthly release it later changed to monthly. The content of issues were balanced between serious and leisure features. The title lasted 14 issues until it was incorporated into Your Commodore.
