= Deactivators =

1986 action-puzzle video game

- Developers: Tigress Marketing; System Software
- Publisher: Ariolasoft
- Designers: David Bishop; Chris Palmer
- Platforms: Amstrad CPC 464, Commodore 64, ZX Spectrum
- Release: 6 October 1986
- Genre: Puzzle
- Mode: Single-player

Deactivators is a 1986 puzzle video game designed by David Bishop and Chris Palmer, developed by Tigress Marketing and System Software, and published by Ariolasoft's action game imprint Reaktor. The player controls bomb disposal robots known as deactivators and must use them to deactivate bombs planted by terrorists in five research complexes. The concept for the game came from a brainstorming session between Bishop and Palmer; its design and development took five to six months to complete. It was released for the Amstrad CPC 464, Commodore 64, and ZX Spectrum platforms in October 1986.

Deactivators received positive reviews from video game critics for its originality and graphics, and was later ranked by Your Sinclair as one of the best games for the ZX Spectrum. Despite the positive reception, it was not commercially successful and Tigress Marketing closed shortly after its release.

== Gameplay ==
Screenshot with the rooms shown at the top and the map of the level below them.

Deactivators is an action puzzle video game. The player controls bomb disposal robots known as deactivators to remove bombs placed in five scientific research complexes by terrorists. Each building constitutes a level that must be completed to progress. A time limit based on fuses of the bombs is set; a burning fuse is displayed when the player picks up a bomb. To dispose of the bombs, the player must make the deactivators throw them from adjacent rooms until they can be tossed out of the exit. Security droids reprogrammed by the terrorists act as obstacles that can destroy the deactivators. If a bomb explodes in a room, everything inside it is destroyed, making it impossible to finish the level. The player can get new deactivators after completing a building.

Four commands can be used in the game: selecting deactivator droids to control, moving the droids, commanding the droids to throw, and scanning the rooms in the building. Each room has different gravity operating from varying directions; some rooms feature the robots moving on the side of the rooms or the ceiling. There are circuit boards that appear in different rooms which must be inserted into a computer in the computer room. The computers are used to activate functions such as opening doors and windows, deactivating force fields that block robots from going to adjacent rooms, and turning on teleporters to warp to different rooms. The game includes a level editor, allowing the player to create rooms.

== Development ==
Deactivators was designed by David Bishop and Chris Palmer. Bishop was the co-founder of Tigress Marketing, the developers of the game; Palmer joined Tigress after leaving Argus Specialist Publications. The concept of the game arose from a brainstorming session between Bishop and Palmer for game ideas. The game was designed by hand using paper to work out the tasks in each building and the timing and routes required to complete them. The design process took a month to complete and development took four or five months. The programming for the game was done by System Software; it was published by Ariolasoft under its Reaktor imprint, which was created to focus on arcade and action games. The original audio, 'Robot Tango', was composed by Simon PC Frost. Deactivators was the first game to be released under the imprint. It was released on 6 October 1986 for the Amstrad CPC 464, Commodore 64, and ZX Spectrum.

Shortly after Deactivators's release, developer Tigress Marketing closed after Ariolasoft, the majority publisher for Tigress, left software publishing. David Bishop continued designing games, later working for Virgin Interactive, Mindscape, and PopCap Games. Palmer left the video games industry to work in information technology.

== Reception ==
Reception

Review scores
Publication	Score
Amstrad Action	87%
Amtix	81%
Crash	85%
Computer and Video Games	9/10 (C64); 8.5/10 (CPC/Spec)
Sinclair User	5/5
Your Sinclair	9/10
Zzap!64	82%

Awards
Publication	Award
Sinclair User	SU Classic
Your Sinclair	Megagame

Deactivators received generally positive reviews from video game critics. The ZX Spectrum version was ranked number 28 in the Your Sinclair "Official Top 100 Games of All Time". A reviewer for Computer and Video Games wrote that it was destined to become a cult game. Andrew Wilton from Amstrad Action praised its gameplay, describing it as "excellent" and noting the room perspective changes as the most interesting feature in the game. Critics also praised the game for its originality. Sinclair User's Taylor Graham compared it favorably with 1984's Spy vs. Spy.

The graphics received mostly positive reactions for each console. Crash and Your Sinclair wrote positively of the Spectrum's graphics. The Crash reviewer praised the details and animations of the droids, and the design of the rooms, as did Gwyn from Your Sinclair, who described the graphics as "clean". Andrew Wilton was disappointed that the game did not make the most of Amstrad's colour limitations. The Commodore 64 graphics were also well received by Zzap!64, which called the game's monochromatic appearance to be "unusual, but effective". The Computer and Video Games reviewer praised the Commodore 64 version for its sound in preference to the Amstrad and Spectrum versions.

Despite being well received from critics, the game was not commercially successful. In an interview with Retro Gamer, Chris Palmer said there was a disconnect between the marketing for the game and what it was actually about.
