= Ninja Master =

1986 video game

- Developer: Tron Software
- Publisher: Firebird Software
- Platforms: Amstrad CPC, Atari 8-bit, Commodore 16 / Plus/4, Commodore 64, ZX Spectrum
- Release: 1986
- Genre: Action

Ninja Master is an action game depicting ninja training which was published in 1986 for various 8-bit home computers by the Firebird Software silver label. The game was developed by Tron Software and was poorly received by reviewers. A sequel, Oriental Hero, was developed by the same company and released in 1987.

== Gameplay ==
Atari 8-bit screenshot

The player controls a ninja who must pass 4 different skill tests that repeat periodically. A minimum score must be achieved to pass the test and move on to the next, otherwise the game ends; the player has three attempts at each test.

In the first test, the ninja is standing in the center of the screen and arrows are shot at him from four possible directions and at various speeds. The arrows must be shot on the fly with an arm or a leg. The second test takes place in an arena with an audience and advertising banners. The player has to smash a board with a karate chop; the test is to accumulate enough force by quickly waving the controls. The third test is similar to the first one, and the player must intercept incoming shurikens with their sword at three possible heights. In the last test, the player has to use a blowgun to hit canisters that are thrown horizontally at the top of the screen.

After passing all the tests, the player receives a belt and starts over at a higher difficulty level.

== Reception ==
Ninja Master was the tenth best-selling video game in the United Kingdom for 1986, across all platforms. It appeared in the top ten best-selling ZX Spectrum games charts for four straight months in Sinclair User, peaking at number five. Despite its strong sales, the game received mostly negative reviews. The editors for Sinclar User gave it one star out of five and concluded that it was "[p]oor quality" and "[not] the Exploding Fist type game it may seem. Avoid". Ken McMahon, reviewer for the Commodore User magazine, disliked the game so much that he gave it the unusual 0/10 rating. The game was rated not much better by Zzap!64, where reviewers summed it up as "cheap and nasty" and gave it an overall 28% rating. Your Commodore reviewer found that "the game has no lasting appeal, and even at the budget price, cannot be recommended".
