= Spooky =

Spooky or Spookey may refer to:

== Arts and entertainment ==
=== Music ===
==== Musicians ====
- Spooky (house music duo)
- Spookey (UK band), a 1970s soul band based in Manchester
- DJ Spooky, musician and producer
- Spookey Ruben, a singer and musician

==== Albums ====
- Spooky (album), by Lush

==== Songs ====
- "Spooky" (Classics IV song), by Mike Sharpe 1966, The Classics IV 1967, Dusty Springfield 1970, and Atlanta Rhythm Section 1979
- "Spooky" (New Order song)
- "Spooky", a song by E-40 from Revenue Retrievin': Graveyard Shift

=== Fictional characters ===
- Spooky, a ghost that Luigi encounters in the video game Luigi's Mansion
- Spooky, the antagonist of the 2002 video game Pac-Man World 2
- Spooky, the nickname of Fox Mulder, of the X-Files television series and movie
- Spooky the Tuff Little Ghost, a Harvey Comics character and cousin of Casper the Friendly Ghost

=== Other uses in arts and entertainment ===
- Spooky, a secondary comic strip accompanying Smokey Stover in Sunday newspapers

== Gunships ==
- Spooky, a variant of the Lockheed AC-130, employed in the Vietnam War
- Douglas AC-47 Spooky, used by the United States Air Force in the Vietnam War

== Other uses ==
- Spooky, a killer whale born in captivity; see List of captive orcas
- Spooky, nickname of asteroid 2015 TB145, which passed Earth on Halloween 2015

== See also ==
- Spook (disambiguation)
- Spookies, a 1986 independent horror film
