= Richard Petty's Talladega =

1984 video game by Cosmi

- Developer: Cosmi
- Publisher: Cosmi
- Designer: Robert T. Bonifacio
- Platforms: Atari 8-bit, Commodore 64
- Release: 1984: Atari; 1985: C64
- Genre: Racing
- Mode: Single-player

Richard Petty's Talladega (later reissued as Talladega) is a racing game featuring Richard Petty and Talladega Superspeedway. It was published by Cosmi in 1984 for Atari 8-bit computers. A Commodore 64 port followed in 1985. It is the first home video game to feature NASCAR racers.

== Gameplay ==
This driver is going the maximum speed possible without a turbo boost.

The player races against "The King" and eighteen other professional drivers. The player must maintain the automobile through strategic pit stops after qualifying. Vehicles in the game have the capability of going 250 miles per hour (402 km/h) without turbo boost and 294 miles per hour (473 km/h) with turbo boost.

Players that do not qualify are not entitled to participate in that particular race, but they can still receive the results, and have a chance to qualify for the next race. The race ends when the player crashes, runs out of gasoline, blows a tire or finishes.

== Reception ==
Commodore User said the game was similar to Pole Position and Pitstop. They felt the strategic elements of the game made it worth playing, but the slow start was a weakness. They also criticised the game for being too long and said they had no idea who Richard Petty was. The game was rated 4/5.

Zzap!64 thought the graphics were "tacky" and the sound "irritating" but found the gameplay to have an "addictive" quality. They found the presentation inferior to Pitstop II. The game was given a 69% rating.

Zzap!64 reviewed the game again a few months later in a feature on racing games. Julian Rignall was unimpressed by the "flickery graphics and pretty feeble sound", but said the game was "pretty addictive and challenging", although not as good as Speed King or Pitstop II. This time a 64% overall rating was given.
