= Wizardry (The Edge) =

1985 video game

- Developer(s): Steven T. Chapman
- Publisher(s): The Edge
- Platform(s): Commodore 64
- Release: NA: 1985; EU: 1985
- Genre(s): Adventure

Wizardry (also known as Spell of Destruction) is an adventure game with some action and role-playing elements, published by The Edge in 1985 for the Commodore 64. It was programmed by Steven T. Chapman (author of Quo Vadis) and the music was composed by Clever Music (Graham Jarvis and Rob Hartshorne) under the alias of Mike Alsop.

== Reception ==
Zzap!64 were impressed by the game's graphics and sound but found the puzzles overly obscure. It was rated 71% overall. Commodore User 11/1985 gave 4.2 of 5 stars. Computer and Video Games 12/1985 rated the game 90 of 100. Eric Doyle of Your Commodore praised the game's graphics, music, and "engrossing and enjoyable" puzzle element. He gave it 7 out of 10 for originality, 8 out of 10 for both playability and value for money, and 9 out of 10 for graphics. German computer magazine Happy Computer 11/1986 gave 74 of 100.
