= Full Throttle (1984 video game) =

- Developer: Mervyn J. Estcourt
- Publishers: Micromega; Digital Integration; Elite Systems; Mastertronic; Zeppelin Games
- Platforms: ZX Spectrum, Amstrad CPC, Commodore 16, Commodore 64, MSX
- Release: 1984: ZX Spectrum; 1985: C64; 1986: C16, CPC, MSX
- Genre: Racing game
- Mode: Single-player

Full Throttle is a video game released in 1984 for the ZX Spectrum and written by Mervyn Estcourt, creator of Deathchase. The player races a 500cc Grand Prix motorcycle on any of ten of the world's top racing circuits. It was ported to other platforms and released under the name Speed King.

== Gameplay ==
After selecting a track to race on, the player starts at the back of the grid, with 39 other bikes. Cornering too quickly will cause a skid, while running off the road slow the bike down, and making contact with another rider forces the bike to a halt, allowing the following riders to stream past the player as the bike gets going again. There are ten circuits in the game, and part of the key to winning is to know the circuit well enough to predict the bends. There is a practice mode, in which the player rides round the track without any other riders, or the player can choose a race of between one and five laps. The best position achieved is shown at the bottom of the menu-screen, along with the player's time ahead of the second-place man. As soon as the track or number of laps is changed, this record is reset.

== Release ==
Following the release of Full Throttle on the ZX Spectrum, Micromega declined Estcourt's Commodore 64 conversion due to their inexperience in the Commodore market and the rising costs in the industry. Instead, Digital Integration published the Commodore port in 1985 under the name Speed King.

In 1986 the game was re-released at budget price. Full Throttle was published for the Spectrum by Elite Systems on their £2.99 Classics label, while Mastertronic published Speed King for the Commodore 64 and ported the game to the Amstrad CPC, Commodore 16 and MSX.

== Reception ==
Reception

Review scores
Publication	Score
Crash	91% (CRASH Smash)
Computer and Video Games	8/10
Sinclair User	8/10
Your Spectrum	4/5 (Hit)

Award
Publication	Award
Crash	Smash

Reviews were positive, with CRASH giving it 91% (a CRASH Smash), Your Spectrum rating it at 4/5, and both Computer and Video Games and Sinclair User rating it at 8/10.

Full Throttle reached the top of the RAM/C charts for the week ending August 8 1984 replacing Psion's Match Point and sold around 90,000 copies worldwide.

In total, Mastertronic's releases of Speed King sold 304,000 copies making it one of their best selling titles.

== Legacy ==
Despite the game not being released for the ZX Spectrum as Speed King, Mastertronic released a Spectrum-exclusive sequel to the game called Speed King 2 in late 1986. The game, which added a split-screen two-player mode, was programmed by Derek Brewster who had also been a Micromega freelancer creating games including Codename MAT and Haunted Hedges.

In 1991, Zeppelin Games, published another sequel to the game as Full Throttle 2.
