= Vermeer (video game series) =

Series of business strategy video games

- Original game cover art
- Genres: Strategy and business simulation
- Publisher: Ariolasoft
- Creator: Ralf Glau

Vermeer is a series of strategy and business simulation video games launched in 1987 by Ariolasoft. It contained three individual games between the original launch and 2004: Vermeer (1987), Vermeer: Die Kunst zu erben (1997), and Vermeer: The Great Art Race (2004).

The name of the game series is reminiscent of the Dutch painter Jan Vermeer. The game title of the original game contained a graphic that is similar to his famous work "Girl with a Pearl Earring", but in the game, the name stands for a fictional art forger named Vico Vermeer.

== Description ==
=== Aim of the game ===
The action takes place in the 1920s. The game is playable in both single and multiplayer modes with up to 4 players (up to 5 in Vermeer 2). The aim of the game is to recover works of art which were lost in the first world war and which belong the players' dying uncle - the Berlin art collector Walter von Grünschild. Each player receives funding from the uncle which has to be increased by various means in order to enable the player to buy at auction various works of art as they come up for sale. The winner will inherit Walter von Grünschild's fortune and gain control of the corporate empire.

=== Gameplay ===
As the main source of income, the player engages in the acquisition of and trade in colonial goods. To this end, property is being acquired all over the world with up to twenty-four plantations for the cultivation of coffee, cocoa, silk, tea or tobacco. The harvested goods are then being sold at major trading venues in London and New York. Commodity forward transactions with individual customers are also possible. In addition, revenue can be generated through stock and foreign exchange trading and it is possible to win money at the racecourse.

With the assets generated, a total of 40 paintings belonging to the uncle's former collection can be acquired at auction. If a player does not have sufficient knowledge of art, he can easily end up with a counterfeit. Numerous deceptively genuine reproductions of the art forger Vico Vermeer are in circulation. In order to generate a game score, only real works or art are counted. Images of the forger Vico Vermeer are accepted by the uncle, as long as none of the other players can present the corresponding original. In order to conceal the pictures players are chasing, players can choose to be represented by intermediaries at auction.

The global economic crisis and many other unforeseen events are troubling the players or offering opportunities and bringing him luck. Numerous gimmicks lighten up the game.

== Versions ==
- Vermeer - the original 1987 release
- Vermeer: Die Kunst zu erben (Vermeer: The Art to Inherit) - a 1997 sequel
- Vermeer: The Great Art Race - a modernised 2004 version, released by Ascaron, also known as Vermeer 2 in Germany.
