= Shaken but Not Stirred =

1982 video game

- Developer: Richard Shepherd Software
- Publisher: Richard Shepherd Software
- Series: James Bond (unofficial)
- Platform: ZX Spectrum
- Release: UK: 1982
- Genre: Interactive fiction
- Mode: Single-player

Shaken but Not Stirred is a 1982 text adventure developed and published by Richard Shepherd Software, and released in the United Kingdom for the ZX Spectrum. The game is based on the fictional spy character of James Bond.

== Gameplay ==
In Shaken but Not Stirred, the player plays as James Bond and must prevent a plot by Dr. Death, who threatens to destroy London with a nuclear warhead unless he receives a ransom. The game begins with a cutscene depicting a jet and its onboard warhead being stolen. The player initially receives a briefing from M, and subsequently chooses from a range of weapons offered by Q. The player may choose three different weapons, which can be used against various enemies.

In the game's first stage, the player must traverse around the world to gather clues in the form of anagrams that will help determine the location of Dr. Death's island base. During the first stage, the player must defend against enemies such as midgets, muggers, and priests, as well as unidentified packages. The player may return to London during the first stage to replenish lost health and restock on ammunition.

In the second stage, the player must locate the entrance to Death's underwater lair. Once in the second stage, the player can no longer return to London. If located, a secret stock of Benzedrine can be used by the player to replenish lost health. Each location on the island is connected, allowing the player to construct a map. However, the locations change each time the stage is replayed. While on the island, the player must defend against enemies that include scorpions, sharks, and wolves.

Upon locating the lair's entrance, the player enters a 10 by 10 room three-dimensional maze. The player must then locate the control room to disarm the nuclear warhead. During the search, the player must avoid Paws, an unbeatable steel-fisted enemy. The player must also avoid a midget enemy named Tic Tac. The player may use a map of the maze up to three times, although the map only appears onscreen for 10 seconds each time it is accessed. When the control room is located, the player must win a puzzle minigame to defuse the warhead and complete the game. Bond then returns to London to drink a vodka martini that has been "shaken, not stirred" in its preparation. The player can save progress once, but cannot save again once a saved game has been loaded.

== Reception ==
Phil Garratt of ZX Computing wrote, "This is the best program I've seen from Richard Shepherd, and there is certainly plenty of it. [...] I think it's a shame that all the graphics are left for the last section, which is very hard to reach. Little use is made of sound and rather too much use is made of the RND function for me to be hooked." Garratt noted the game's use of drugs to restore the player's health, writing, "I don't remember James Bond ever taking drugs (apart from the occasional Mickey Finn!) and I'm not sure it's the sort of idea that should be incorporated in a game."

Computer and Video Games wrote that the game had the "authentic 'feel'" of a James Bond novel, and wrote, "At last a realistic 007 adventure! The mode of play is quite different from most Adventure games, successfully recreating the world of James Bond on a computer." Sinclair User called the game a "fast-moving, machine code adventure but stage one can be slightly monotonous as it is all too easy to be killed. There are also random elements in the game which hamper the planning of strategy."
