= Kaiser (video game) =

1984 video game

- Developer: Ariolasoft
- Publisher: Ariolasoft
- Platforms: Atari 8-bit, Commodore 64 Amstrad CPC
- Release: January 1984
- Genre: Strategy
- Modes: Single-player, multiplayer

Kaiser is a West German strategy video game developed and published by Ariolasoft. In 2003 Kaiser II author Carsten Strotmann released the source code under the GNU General Public Licence.

== Gameplay ==
Kaiser is a turn-based strategy game where the player take the role of an 18th-century German regent and manages the assets and finances of an estate, with the ultimate goal of becoming the Kaiser of Germany. The game may be played in single-player, or multiplayer with up to nine players. A player's health determines the player's age (neither health or age are displayed in-game), and may change depending on the length of a players' turn; players may die of old age, ending the game.

== Reception ==
Reception

Review scores
Publication	Score
Your Computer	3/5 (C64, CPC)
Amstrad Action	37% (CPC)
Zzap!64	61% (C64)

Your Computer gave the Amstrad CPC and Commodore 64 versions of Kaiser an overall score of 3 out of 5, calling it "a fun game" and compared the game's resource management to that of M.U.L.E.. Zzap!64 described the game's map interface as "clear and useful", but criticized its "crude" scrolling and "unambitious" visuals. Zzap!64 described the game as "diplomacy in miniature", noting that "there is a great deal of strategy involved" but that it may be frustrating due to dying from old age, describing it as a "random factor" that abruptly stopped their progress. Amstrad Action gave the CPC version an overall score of 37%, calling it "old-fashioned", with one reviewer saying it reminded them too much of ZX81 games, and another that it wasn't fun "if you've played any game written in the last five years". Amstrad Action also criticized Kaiser's graphics and "unclear" font, as well as its translation from German to English, noting translation errors and misspellings.
