= Richard Shepherd Software =

British software house active between 1982 and 1985

Richard Shepherd Software Ltd
- Type: Private
- Industry: Video games
- Founded: February 1982
- Founder: Richard Shepherd
- Defunct: 1985
- Fate: Folded
- Headquarters: Slough, United Kingdom
- Key people: Richard Shepherd, Pete Cooke
- Products: Urban Upstart, Everest Ascent

Richard Shepherd Software was a British software house active between 1982 and 1985. The company was mainly known for releasing text adventure games. These were programmed by Richard Shepherd himself and Pete Cooke.

== History ==
Richard Shepherd had worked as an accountant and taught himself programming on a ZX81 in his spare time. During this time his wife Elaine took an interest in text adventure games. Upon her disappointment about a purchased game Richard suggested writing their own. Their company started out in February 1982 from the Shepherd's dining room in their house in Maidenhead. Its first product was Bargain Bytes, a collection of games and utilities for the ZX81. Due to the release of the ZX81's successor ZX Spectrum in April 1982 the company had to switch to the new machine. A major step for the company was when retailer WHSmith ordered the adventure Transylvanian Tower for its stores in February 1983. At this point Richard Shepherd quit his daytime job and focused on the software company. The company moved into an office in Slough and hired the first employees.

Richard Shepherd's finance utility, Cash Controller, was the first Spectrum program to be designed to work with the ZX Microdrive.

In 1991 an issue of Amstrad Action (May, No. 68 p. 70) published an artillery game type-in program called Warzone. Consisting of 144 lines of code, the author was noted down as one "Richard Shephard down Bristol way".

== List of publications ==
List of publications
Program title	Prod. year	Refs.
Cash Controller	1983	
Devils of the Deep	1983	
Everest Ascent	1983	
The Inferno	1984	
Invincible Island	1983	
Jackpot Fruit Machine	1982	
Monster Mine	1982	
Shaken but Not Stirred	1982	
Ship of the Line	1982	
Ski Star 2000	1985	
Submarine Attack	1982	
Super Space Mission	1982	
Super Spy	1982	
Transylvanian Tower	1982	
Upper Gumtree	1984	
Urban Upstart	1983	
