= List of Commodore 64 games =

This is a list of games for the Commodore 64 personal computer system, sorted alphabetically. See Lists of video games for other platforms.

Because of the length of the list, it has been broken down to two parts:

- List of Commodore 64 games (A–M)
- List of Commodore 64 games (N–Z)

== See also ==
- Commodore 64 Games System
