= Blitzkrieg: From the Rise of Hitler to the Fall of Dunkirk =

1979 book by Len Deighton

- First edition
- Author: Len Deighton
- Language: English
- Genre: Non-fiction military history
- Publisher: Jonathan Cape
- Publication date: 3 Sep 1979
- Publication place: Great Britain
- Media type: Print (Hardback & Paperback)
- Pages: 320
- ISBN: 978-0-224-01648-3

Blitzkrieg: From the Rise of Hitler to the Fall of Dunkirk is a 1979 military history book by Len Deighton. Unlike most of Deighton's other work the book is entirely non-fiction.

== Details ==
The book explains Adolf Hitler's victory in 1940 in the Western Campaign. Deighton points out that Allies had far greater resources than the Germans. Deighton considers Hitler's military skills astonishing considering his background and complete lack of training (p. 52).

Literally meaning "Lightning War", Blitzkrieg is the tactic of speed and the avoidance of unnecessary conflict, which were the keys to the rapid German advance.

The foreword is by general Walter Nehring, formerly Heinz Guderian's chief of staff.

=== Contents ===
- Part 1: Hitler and his army
- Part 2: Hitler at war.
- Part 3: Blitzkrieg:Weapons and methods.
- Part 4: The battle for the river Meuse.
- Part 5: The flawed victory.

== Adaptations ==
- 1987 Len Deighton's Blitzkrieg computer game was published by Ariolasoft for the Commodore 64. The game was designed by John Lambshead and Gordon Paterson and programmed by Gary Yorke and James Poole.
