= Oriental Hero =

1987 video game

- Developer: Tron Software
- Publisher: Firebird Software
- Designers: Michel Nass; Tommy Gardh
- Programmer: Tommy Gardh
- Artist: Michel Nass
- Composer: Michel Nass
- Platform: ZX Spectrum
- Release: July 1987
- Genre: Beat 'em up

Oriental Hero is a ninja-themed side-scrolling beat-'em-up video game published in 1987 exclusively for the ZX Spectrum under the Firebird Software Silver Range label. It was developed by Tron Software as the sequel to their 1986 multi-platform release, Ninja Master.

== Gameplay and plot ==
The player ninja on the road to Zerwin. Enemies scroll into view from the left and the right.

Oriental Hero centers on the ninja protagonist, who after achieving victory in the previous game Ninja Master travels on the road leading to the palace of Zerwin the Wizard, who the protagonist must eventually defeat in order to win the title of Supreme Oriental Combat Master.

The game comprises four levels, each a horizontally scrolling platform on which the player-ninja must fight several ground and flying enemies and projectiles before reaching the boss at the end of the level. The player-ninja can defend himself by jumping or ducking; his only fighting moves are punching, kicking, and flying-kicking. The projectiles appear rapidly and can kill the player with one hit but can themselves be killed with one hit. The ground enemies on the other hand take between one and three hits to kill. The bosses at the end of each level—the Terrible Indian Cobra, the Highly Technical Triple Armed War Unit, Ivan Dragovich the Russian Master, and Zerwin the Wizard—can be killed with three hits.

== Development ==
Michel Nass and Tommy Gardh of Tron Software, a Swedish video game development company, began working on Oriental Hero in late 1986, shortly after the release of Ninja Master, its predecessor. Nass was responsible for coding the game while Gardh produced the graphics and sound.

Oriental Hero was published in July 1987 by Firebird Software on their Silver Range budget label. It was one of the last of the games on the Silver Range before parent company Telecomsoft spun off the management of that label into its own subsidiary, Silverbird, in late 1987. The game supports both Sinclair's and Kempston Micro Electronics's joystick as controllers, as well as keyboard control through the ZX Spectrum's built-in keyboard. Though the ZX Spectrum 128 was out by the time of Oriental Hero's release, the game does not take advantage of that system's increased memory and supports the original 48-KB ZX Spectrum.

== Reception ==
Reception

Review scores
Publication	Score
Crash	30% (average of 3 reviews)
Sinclair User	4/10
Your Sinclair	6/10

Like its predecessor, Oriental Hero received mixed, mostly negative, reviews. A writer for the Airdrie & Coatbridge Advertiser called it a guilty pleasure—"a budget game which I know I shouldn't have enjoyed, but I did"—that provided "a few hours worth of fun". The writer praised the pixel art of the character sprites and felt the fighting mechanics worked "reasonably well" but called the command of movement "somewhat limited, and the side-scrolling "leav[ing] a bit to be desired". Despite the game's steep difficulty curve, the writer called the challenge addictive—"a couple of hours whisked by before I knew it"—with the challenge waning after a short while. Tony Dillon of Sinclair User meanwhile gave it four stars out of ten, writing that the game "is all so fast ... winning starts becoming a matter of luck".

Your Sinclair's Rick Robson deemed the game lacking imagination and found it had nothing to offer for advanced players of kung-fu games but praised the graphics and sound and surmised that it would do well in sales. Nick Roberts, Ben Stone, and Paul Sumner, in a collective review for Crash, gave the game an average score of 30%. They criticized the game for its "rubbish" gameplay, "poor" graphics and not having lasting appeal. Stone called it "so incredibly bad it's almost worth a look". Like Robson, Roberts praised the graphics and sound but called the gameplay frustrating. Sumner called the game "totally unplayable; the graphics are very badly animated, with uninvolving backgrounds. Firebird should know better". The Portuguese newspaper A Capital called Oriental Hero a game to avoid and a black mark on the generally well-regarded catalog of Firebird, the game as a whole "add[ing] nothing to what is already known" and appearing glitchy, especially in the "bad animation" of the sprites.
