= Cavelord =

1985 video game

- Developer: Axis Komputerkunst
- Publishers: Atari Germany; Ariolasoft
- Designer: Peter Finzel
- Platform: Atari 8-bit
- Release: 1985
- Genre: Action-adventure
- Modes: Single-player, multiplayer

Cavelord is an action-adventure game written by Peter Finzel for Atari 8-bit computers. It was published by Atari Germany and Ariolasoft in 1985.

== Gameplay ==
Lightning strikes

The player controls the hero Telos on his winged horse Pegamis and has to explore two caves within a large scrolling playfield. While exploring the caves the player is threatened by flying creatures called "Nemesides" that appear occasionally. The player must also avoid obstacles such as striking lightning, exploding volcanoes, and falling rocks. If the player runs into any of these obstacles strength points are deducted. The player can replenish strength by collecting strength symbols. Dangling vines slow the player's movement, but not that of the Nemesides. The player can shoot and destroy Nemesides, but this is optional. The game doesn't award any score.

To advance, Telos must collect and use different items in the caves. The ultimate goal is to collect three crown pieces which are scattered around the caves and bring the completed crown to King Arud near the game's starting point.

In one-player-mode, it's only possible to shoot in the most recent direction moved, whereas in two-player mode one player moves the hero and the other player shoots. The game has three difficulty levels which differ in the amount of strength deducted when running into adversaries and in the frequency of the appearance of Nemesides.

== Development ==
Cavelord uses George Frideric Handel's Passepied in C major as its title music.

== Reception ==
Cavelord received a positive review in the March 1985 issue of German magazine Happy Computer.
