= Everest Ascent =

1983 video game

- Developer: Richard Shepherd Software
- Publisher: Richard Shepherd Software
- Platforms: ZX Spectrum, Commodore 64
- Release: 1983
- Genre: Adventure
- Mode: Single-player

Everest Ascent is a text and graphics adventure game for the ZX Spectrum and Commodore 64 computers. It was published by Richard Shepherd Software in 1983. The goal is to reach the top of Mount Everest in 20 days. Players must allocate their limited funds to keep their sherpas well fed and supplied in order to reach the summit.

Contemporary reviews of Everest Ascent in computer hobbyist magazines were frequently concerned with the game's difficulty, but considered the game positively overall. Your Computer magazine wrote of the game that it is "more of a strategy game than a straight Adventure [sic]", and joked that the significant difficulty may be due to the sherpas you hire in-game having English names, rather than Nepalese names, and thus, "not what they used to be". Crash called the game "a good average." Home Computing Weekly complained that the player's interface offered insufficient information, but still found the game interesting.
