= Wizard (1984 video game) =

- North American cover art
- Developers: PP&S (Note: Ultimate Wizard additional development by Electronic Arts.)
- Publishers: NA: PP&S; EU: Ariolasoft; NA: Electronic Arts (Ultimate)
- Designers: Sean A. Moore; Steve Luedders-Dieckbrader
- Platform: Commodore 64
- Release: Wizard: NA: 1984; EU: 1984; Ultimate Wizard: NA: 1986; EU: 1986
- Genre: Platform
- Modes: Single-player, multiplayer

Wizard is a video game developed for the Commodore 64 written by Sean A. Moore and Steve Luedders-Dieckbrader for Progressive Peripherals and Software (PP&S) out of Denver, Colorado in 1984.

== Gameplay ==
Each level contains keys, and the object is for Wilfrid the Wizard to get each key to move on to the next location. Each level requires a different spell to find the key, and every key found gives Wilfrid a finite number of times he can cast the spell. Some spells cast projectiles, which can either kill or freeze enemies, while some teleport Wilfrid around, either by turning him to a non-corporeal "shadow" or by instantly moving him to his starting point.

The player character, Wilfrid, is a wizard in purple robes, and his enemies include witches, knights, giant insects, and other various monsters.

== Development ==
Wizard was created contemporaneously with the Epyx release Jumpman. Steve Luedders stated that it was a coincidence, and that he felt Wizard could have been more successful if Jumpman had not been released first (company size and marketing resources being a significant factor).

== Ultimate Wizard ==
Craig Smith and Aaron Hightower teamed up to make an improved construction set in their homes in North Richland Hills, Texas. They communicated with Sean and Steve to understand the memory layout for the levels and then set out to create an advanced construction set better than the one included with the original game. Among other things, their construction set included the ability to create "treasure matrices" that allowed the user to create special effects similar to the ones seen in the main levels. The original set had remnants in its code alluding to features that had been disabled, likely due to their instability or lack of documentation.

PP&S took the code from Craig and Aaron and released it commercially in a package called the Wizard Expansion Set. This add-on pack also included 50 new levels from a competition held by the company specifically for the expansion; none of the new levels had any advanced features because of the limitations of the original construction set.

Electronic Arts, including Paul Reiche III, used the Construction set created by Aaron and Craig to create a new set of levels. The Construction Set was also included by EA, as were a combination of levels from the original game and from the expansion pack, albeit in a different order from the original PP&S releases. The Ultimate Wizard version also featured some changes to existing levels to increase their difficulty, as well as different sprites for some of the game's monsters.

== Reception ==
Compute!'s Gazette approved of the "instant playability" of the Commodore 64 version of Ultimate Wizard, reporting that it "has become a favorite of the neighborhood youngsters".
