= Ralph Bosson's High Seas =

1987 video game

- Publisher: Gardé Games of Distinction
- Platforms: Apple II, Commodore 64, MS-DOS
- Release: 1987
- Genre: Simulation

Ralph Bosson's High Seas is a 1987 video game published by Gardé Games of Distinction.

== Gameplay ==
Ralph Bosson's High Seas is a game in which seafaring combat from the years 1750 to 1810 is emphasized.

== Reception ==
Bob Proctor reviewed the game for Computer Gaming World, and stated that "The overall design and flexibility of High Seas are excellent. The level of simulation and the graphics are satisfactory, but the problems with the manual and the glitches during multi-ship actions prevent me from giving it a hearty recommendation."
