= Tracksuit Manager =

1988 video game

- Developer: Goliath Games
- Publisher: Goliath Games
- Designer: Doug Matthews
- Platforms: Commodore 64, Amstrad CPC, Atari ST, Amiga, ZX Spectrum
- Release: EU: 1988
- Genre: Sports management (Soccer/Association football)
- Mode: Single-player

Tracksuit Manager is a sports management video game that takes the conventional Football Manager game style from the 1980s in a various number of methods. It was released for the Commodore 64, Amstrad CPC, Atari ST, Amiga, and ZX Spectrum.

== Gameplay ==
Amstrad CPC screenshot

The player controls an international football team who has failed to perform adequately in the 1986 FIFA World Cup and must qualify for the 1990 FIFA World Cup through the 1988 European Championships. Instead of a transfer market, the player is given a choice between 100 eligible football players and must choose from 22 of them. The matches are presented in the running commentary style of sports announcing with a small graphic depicting where the ball is. Players must qualify for the 1988 UEFA European Football Championships in West Germany.

All the famous football players like Peter Shilton and Diego Maradona are included in this game. There is an England player called 'Breacher' in the game. In reality there was no recognised top flight footballer with this name. Many commentators assume that this error was due to a typo of the name of then Luton Town player Tim Breacker.

== Reception ==
Reception

Award
Publication	Award
Sinclair User	SU Classic

The game went to number 2 in the UK sales charts, behind Daley Thompson's Olympic Challenge.

== See also ==
- World Championship Boxing Manager, Goliath's next game
