= Time Tunnels =

Board game

Time Tunnels is a 1981 board game published by Uncontrollable Dungeon Master.

== Gameplay ==
Time Tunnels is a game in which two to four players build fleets for strategic warfare in space.

== Reception ==
Tony Watson reviewed Time Tunnels in The Space Gamer No. 45. Watson commented that "Time Tunnels has no new concepts or anything particularly exciting about it. Neither is the game an outright turkey; it shows some thought and plays well. There are just better games on the subject and in this price range."
