= Seabase Delta =

1986 video game

- Publisher: Firebird Software
- Designers: Peter Torrance; Colin Liddle
- Platforms: Amstrad CPC, Commodore 64, ZX Spectrum
- Release: 1986
- Genre: Interactive fiction
- Mode: Single-player

Seabase Delta is a text adventure game by Firebird released in 1986 for the Amstrad CPC, Commodore 64, and ZX Spectrum home computers. It is the sequel to Subsunk.

== Plot ==
In Subsunk, the journalist Ed Lines, stranded aboard the wrecked submarine Sea Lion, successfully sent a distress signal to headquarters and now awaits rescue. But the message has been intercepted by enemy agents, who arrange for Sea Lion to be towed into Seabase Delta, where she will not be found. Ed Lines emerges from the submarine to find the Seabase mysteriously deserted; he must discover its secrets and escape.

== Gameplay ==
Like its predecessor, Seabase Delta is an adventure made using The Quill with simple graphics. The player must explore the enemy seabase and escape.

== Reception ==
Sinclair User: "The text itself is at a fairly basic level but the structure of the base, the travel system and the many messages and objects provide an atmosphere in their own right. The jokey approach also helps to keep your spirits up and you will find yourself quickly caught up in the game."

ZX Computing: "The game has some fairly attractive fullscreen graphics... reasonably descriptive, though not Booker Prize winning, text... EXAMINE is particularly responsive, and often gives somewhat blatant clues ... Generally, though, good fun to play..."
