= Ariolasoft =

German video game developer

Ariolasoft GmbH
- Type: GmbH
- Industry: Video games
- Predecessor: none
- Founded: 1983
- Founder: Ariola Records
- Defunct: 1993
- Fate: Acquired by MicroProse Germany
- Successor: United Software
- Headquarters: Germany, West Germany
- Area served: Europe
- Products: Computer games
- Parent: Ariola Records
- Subsidiaries: Ariolasoft UK

Ariolasoft GmbH, later known as United Software, was a German video game developer, publisher and distributor. It started in 1983 as the software subsidiary of Ariola Records, itself the record division of Germany's large Bertelsmann empire. From 1985 to 1988 Stephen Molyneux, formerly Head of Software at Atari International GmbH in Hamburg, held the position of Head of Software with responsibility for international negotiations and licensing of software at its headquarters in Munich. Ariolasoft also had a British subsidiary, Ariolasoft UK, which was run by Ashley Gray (later replaced by Willie Carminke) and Frank Brunger.

The company released games for the ZX Spectrum, Commodore 64, MS-DOS, Atari 8-bit, Atari ST and Amiga systems. It was also the German publisher for Activision games developed for the Atari 2600, and the European publisher for Electronic Arts and Broderbund games, before those companies set up their own European offices. Ariolasoft also developed the cassette ports of those titles, and also developed original games. In addition to software activities, they were also the German distributor of the Master System between approximately 1987 and 1988.

In 1990, the company was renamed United Software, which in 1993 was taken over by MicroProse Germany.

== Original games and non-EA or Broderbund titles ==
The following table includes titles developed, commissioned, or licensed for European release by Ariolasoft (excluding North American imports from Electronic Arts and Broderbund).

Game Name	Year	Developer	Label	Platforms									
Game Name	Year	Developer	Label	C64	CPC	Spec	Atari	MSX	ST	Amiga	Apple II	PCW	C16
Batalyx	1985	Batlalyx	Ariolasoft	●									
Bride of Frankenstein	1987	Viz Design	39 Steps	●	●	●							
Camelot Warriors	1985	Dinamic Software	Ariolasoft	●	●	●							
Centurions: Power X Treme	1987	Byte Engineers	Reaktor	●	●	●							
Challenge of the Gobots	1987	Tony Crowther	Reaktor	●	●	●							
Deadringer	1987	Ariolasoft	Reaktor	●		●							
Deactivators	1986	Tigress	Reaktor	●	●	●							
Deathscape	1987	Starlight	Starlight	●	●	●							
Degas	1985	Batteries Included	Ariolasoft						●				
Degas Elite	1986	Batteries Included	Ariolasoft						●				
Dogfight 2187	1987	Starlight	Starlight	●	●	●							
Floyd the Droid	1985	Radarsoft	Ariolasoft	●									
Golf Construction Set	1985	Andromeda / Tigress	Ariolasoft	●									
Greyfell: Legend of Norman	1987	Starlight	Starlight	●	●	●							
Hybrid	1987	Starlight	Starlight	●	●	●							
Hyperforce	1986	Tony Takoushi	Ariolasoft	●						●			●
Kaiser	1984	Ariolasoft	Ariolasoft	●	●		●						
Killer Ring	1987	Tony Crowther	Reaktor	●	●								
Lapis Philosophorum	1985	pH Soft	Ariolasoft	●			●						
Len Deighton's Blitzkrieg	1987	Gary Yorke	39 Steps	●									
Maps Britain	1985	Radarsoft	Ariolasoft	●									
Matrix and Laserzone	1986	LLamasoft	Ariolasoft										●
Mountie Mick's Deathride	1987	Ariolasoft	Reaktor	●	●	●							
Mrs. Mop	1987	John Stevenson	Ariolasoft	●									
Out of this World	1987	Bettertech	Reaktor	●	●	●							
Panzadrome	1985	RamJam Corp	Ariolasoft		●	●							
Paperclip	1985	Batteries Included	Ariolasoft	●			●						
Pile-Up!	1987	Christop Shulte Vennbur	Reaktor	●									
Red L.E.D.	1987	Starlight	Starlight	●	●	●							
Scarabaeus	1985	Andromeda	Ariolasoft	●									
Sepulcri	1986	Chris Sawyer	Ariolasoft		●	●		●					
Starburst	1986	Tony Takoushi	Ariolasoft										●
Starfox	1987	Realtime Games	Reaktor	●	●	●							
Starship Andromeda	1986	Andromeda	Ariolasoft	●									
The Big Deal (Floyd 2)	1986	Radarsoft	Ariolasoft	●							●		
The Fourth Protocol	1985	Electronic Pencil Co	Ariolasoft	●	●	●			●			●	
The Terrors of Trantoss	1986	RamJam Corp	Ariolasoft		●	●							
They $tole a Million	1986	Tigress	39 Steps	●	●	●							
Think!	1985	Tigress	Ariolasoft		●	●							
Toadrunner	1986	Dave Harper	Ariolasoft	●	●	●							
Triaxos	1987	Pennsoft	39 Steps	●	●	●							
TUJAD	1986	Orpheus	Ariolasoft		●	●							
Valkyrie 17	1984	Ram Jam	Ariolasoft	●		●							
Vermeer	1987	Ralf Glau / Ariolasoft	Ariolasoft	●									
Voidrunner + Hellgate	1987	LLamasoft	Ariolasoft										●
Werewolves of London	1987	Viz Design	Ariolasoft	●	●	●							
Werner: Let's go!	1986	Semmel Verlach	Ariolasoft	●	●								
Wild West	1985	Andromeda	Ariolasoft	●									
Wizard	1984	Progressive	Ariolasoft	●									
Zarjaz	1987	Daryl Etherington	Reaktor	●									
Ziggurat	1988	Chris Sawyer	Ariolasoft	●	●	●							

== Collaborations ==
- Cavelord with Atari Germany
