= Wizard (American band) =

American psychedelic/hard rock band

- Origin: Tampa, Florida, U.S.
- Genres: hard rock, psychedelic rock
- Years active: 1970–1971
- Label: Peon Records
- Members: David Voysey
- Past members: Ben Schultz; Paul Forney; Chris Luhn

Wizard were an American psychedelic/hard rock band, which formed in 1970 in Tampa, Florida, and disbanded 16 months after the formation. Wizard released just one studio album—which went unnoticed—but, according to AllMusic, "…their sound was considerably more imaginative and interesting than much hard rock from the period, including many of the similar bands who earned far more commercial popularity than they did".

== Band history ==
Wizard formed in spring 1970 at the University of South Florida when singer and bassist Paul Forney and guitarist Ben Schultz met through a mutual friend, jammed together and formed a short-lived rock trio, Brother. Prior to their first gig, their drummer walked out on soundcheck and was promptly replaced by roadie Chris Luhn, who proved to be a competent instrumentalist. The new band changed their name to Wizard. The band was touring in Florida, Georgia, Alabama, Michigan, and Illinois, opening for Iron Butterfly, Chicago, Mountain, and Rod Stewart, among others. At the Goose Lake Festival, outside Detroit, they caught attention of Decca Records' Bob Fletcher, who took the group to Atlanta's LeFevre Sound Studios for a recording session. As a result, The Original Wizard, the band's first and only album, released in 1971 on Peon Records. Wizard continued to perform, including a gig the next winter at an indoor festival at the Hollywood Fairgrounds in Florida, but not for long: sixteen months after forming, the band called it quits.

Forney went on to put over one million miles on the road with R&B big hitters such as Timmy Thomas ("Why Can't We Live Together"), Little Beaver ("Party Down"), Gwen McCrae ("Rockin' Chair") and later toured and recorded six albums with the Jimmy Castor Bunch. Still an accomplished bassist and vocalist, he continues to perform with jazz and R&B artist Rob Mullins. Schultz went on to do live and studio work for Buddy Miles, Belinda Carlisle, Stephen Stills, Diana Ross, Ric Ocasek, Ricky Nelson, and Rod Stewart, among others. More recently, Schultz was a co-founder of the power group, Barefoot Servants (now on extended hiatus). Luhn went on to finish college and, later, law school. He is now a personal injury and divorce trial lawyer in Albany, New York.

== Members ==
- Ben Schultz – lead and rhythm guitars, vocal
- Paul Forney – lead vocal, bass
- Chris Luhn – drums

== Discography ==
- The Original Wizard (Peon Records, 1971)
