= On-Court Tennis =

1984 video game

- Publisher: Activision
- Platform: Commodore 64
- Release: 1984
- Genre: Sports
- Mode: Single-player

On-Court Tennis is a computer game developed by Activision's Gamestar division and published in 1984 for the Commodore 64.

== Gameplay ==
On-Court Tennis is a tennis simulation in which the player can challenge either the computer or another player. The game automatically moves the avatar to the ball; the player controls the swing and timing.

== Reception ==
In 1985, Ahoy! stated that the Commodore 64 version of On-Court Tennis "features fluid animation, highly sophisticated computerized opponents in the solitaire mode, and true-to-life strategy". It concluded that the game was "truly a landmark computer entertainment program. It takes a fresh look at a subject, video tennis, which many considered totally washed out. This outstanding disk proves them wrong". In 1988, Dragon gave the game 4 out of 5 stars.
