= World Championship Boxing Manager =

1990 video game

- Developer: Goliath Games
- Publisher: Goliath Games
- Platforms: Amiga, Atari ST, MS-DOS, Amstrad CPC, Commodore 64, ZX Spectrum
- Release: 1990
- Genre: Sports
- Mode: Single-player

World Championship Boxing Manager is a 1990 boxing management video game developed and published by Goliath Games for the Amiga, Atari ST, MS-DOS, Amstrad CPC, Commodore 64, and ZX Spectrum. A sequel, World Championship Boxing Manager 2, was released in 2023.

== Gameplay ==
The player is a boxing promoter whose job is to train and arrange matches for up to five boxers. The goal is to win the world championship in either Federation of World Boxing (FWB) or World Council of International Boxing (WCIB). Between rounds during a match, the player can heal the boxer and tell the boxer to change the fighting style.

== Reception ==
Reception

Review scores
Publication	Score
ACE	955/1000 (Amiga)
Amiga Format	76%
Amstrad Action	71%
ST Format	80%
The Games Machine (UK)	56% (ST); 57% (Amiga)
Your Sinclair	91%
Commodore User	90% (Amiga); 89% (C64)
Power Play	38% (Amiga, C64, DOS, ST)

Award
Publication	Award
Your Sinclair	Megagame

ACE called the game "one of the most in depth and entertaining strategy games yet". Your Sinclair said the game is "[d]espite appearances, a superb management game — versatile and very addictive." Power Play said the game gets boring quickly because there's a lack of variety in the gameplay. Amiga Format said that management game fans may find the game too shallow but more casual players may enjoy it more.

== Sequel ==
A sequel, World Championship Boxing Manager 2, was originally scheduled for release in spring 2022 and later delayed to the fourth quarter of 2022. It was released on January 17, 2023, for Windows. Console versions for the Nintendo Switch, PlayStation 4, and Xbox One were released on May 17, 2023.

Eurogamer gave the game a score of six out of ten, complimenting the art direction but criticizing the repetitiveness of the gameplay.

== See also ==
- Tracksuit Manager, Goliath's previous game
