= Painterboy =

1986 video game

- Title screen
- Developer: Chart Top Design
- Publisher: Tikkurila
- Platform: Commodore 64
- Release: 1986
- Genre: Action
- Mode: Single player

Painterboy is a game for Commodore 64. Released in 1986, it is one of the first advergames produced in Finland. The game advertises paints from Finnish paint company Tikkurila. It is based on "Father and Son" characters from Tikkurila's TV advertisements of the time, though somewhat caricatured compared to the advertisements, which had actors.

== Gameplay ==
The game is divided into two sections: driving and painting.

In the driving part, the objective is to drive from the office to the house to paint and back. First, the player needs to pick a correct paint to paint the house with; a wrong choice (such as oil paint for a concrete building) will result in a chastisement from the Father. Driving is straightforward and is shown from above; the target building shows up in the game map, highlighted with Tikkurila's logo, and the compass shows where to drive. Driving off the road, colliding with a building, or getting run over by a train will make the player lose a life.

In the painting section, the player controls the Son, painting various sections of the building. The player must avoid painting any undesired things, such as dogs, birds, the Father, and the Girl Next Door.

== Availability ==
The retail price for the game was 67.00 mk for tape version and 69.00 mk for diskette (nominally about 11 €). The game was only available through mail order from Chart Top Design, the developer of the game.
