= Deathchase =

1983 video game

- Publishers: Micromega; Ventamatic (Spain); Timex (US)
- Designer: Mervyn Estcourt
- Platform: ZX Spectrum
- Release: 1983
- Genre: Vehicular combat
- Mode: Single-player

Deathchase is a 1983 vehicular combat game written for the ZX Spectrum by Mervyn Estcourt and published by Micromega in the UK. In Spain it was published by Ventamatic. The "3D" designation on the box led to the game sometimes being misnamed "3D Deathchase", including in reviews. Timex USA published Deathchase for its range of computers in the US as Cyclepath.

== Gameplay ==
One of the bikes being pursued can be seen on the right of the screen.

The player controls a motorcycle-riding mercenary as he pursues two other motorcycles, one blue and one yellow, through a forest. Each enemy motorcycle destroyed is worth $1000 (i.e. points) to the player. The player's motorcycle is equipped with forward-firing guns with which to shoot its quarry. The projectiles can be controlled mid-flight simply by steering the bike. If both enemy motorcycles are destroyed, the player moves to a night version of the same level. If both enemy motorcycles on that level are destroyed, the player moves on to a daytime level of the next stage (with more trees to avoid). There are also tanks and helicopters which appear on the horizon and can be shot for bonus points.

The game takes place over eight stages. When stage eight is completed, the game returns to the start.

== Reception ==
Reception

Award
Publication	Award
Crash	Smash!

ZX Spectrum gaming magazine Crash described Deathchase as "an extremely simple idea for a game, and utterly compelling to play" and awarded it a rating of 92%. In 1992, it was nominated as the best Spectrum game of all time in the magazine Your Sinclair. This status has been cemented by subsequent publications. Both Crash and Your Sinclair referred to the game as "3D Deathchase".

== Legacy ==
Andrew Leyden's remake, Death Chase 2002 was highlighted in Edge magazine's retro special. It was described as "pleasant enough" but lacking the feel of the original.
