= Spook (nickname) =

Spook is a nickname of:

- Thomas Dowler (1903-1986), American football, basketball and baseball player and football and basketball coach
- Rupert Hanley (born 1952), South African cricketer
- Spook Jacobs (1925–2011), American Major League Baseball player
- Billy J. Murphy (1921-2008), head football coach at the University of Memphis from 1958 to 1971

Robert "Spook" Yaros- American rock drummer
