= Space Action =

1983 video game

- Developer(s): Arne Fernlund
- Publisher(s): Handic Software AB
- Platform(s): Commodore 64
- Release: 1983
- Genre(s): Scrolling shooter

Space Action is a horizontally scrolling shooter created for the Commodore 64 by Arne Fernlund. The game took three months to develop and was distributed on cartridge by the Swedish company Handic. More than 10,000 copies were sold world-wide. The game became popular in Italy, where about 7,000 of the copies were sold, and was also a minor success in Australia.

== Legacy ==
Space Action made an appearance at an exhibition that the Swedish National Museum of Science and Technology held in 2008.

Fernlund did some work on a sequel, Space Action 2, but it was never completed.

The history behind Fernlund creating Space Action was featured in the Swedish documentary "Det svenska spelundret" (eng. "The Swedish gaming wonder").
