= Spooked =

Spooked can refer to:

- Spooked (album), a 2004 album by Robyn Hitchcock
- Spooked, a 1997 album by Pretty Maids
- Spooked (comics), a comic book published by Oni Press
- Spooked (film), a 2004 New Zealand film directed by Geoff Murphy
- "Spooked" (Fear Itself), a 2008 episode of the horror anthology Fear Itself
- "Spooked" (The Office), 2011 episode of American comedy series The Office
- Spooked: The Ghosts of Waverly Hills Sanatorium a 2006 Sci Fi Channel documentary filmed at Waverly Hills Sanatorium
- Spooked, a 2014 webseries on Geek & Sundry and Hulu
- Spooked (podcast), a 2017 podcast presented by Glynn Washington's Snap Judgment
