= Roadwars =

1987 video game

- Publisher: Melbourne House
- Platforms: Arcade, Amiga, Atari ST, Commodore 64, ZX Spectrum
- Release: 1987
- Genre: Action game

Roadwars is the first arcade game developed by Arcadia, the short-lived arcade game division of Mastertronic. The home computer versions were developed by Binary Design and published by Melbourne House, who had recently been acquired by Mastertronic. Versions of the game released in the US were distributed by Electronic Arts.

== Plot ==
Roadwars is a game in which the player drives a Battlesphere, an oval-shaped mobile weapon system armed with a laser cannon and a protective shield. Battlespheres protect the stability of the spaceways between the moons of the planet Armageddon by destroying destructive debris. The magnetic side panels which allow vehicles to travel on the spaceways are malfunctioning and can delay or even destroy a Battlesphere.

== Gameplay ==
Roadwars is an arcade-like game which can be played with one or two players, and uses a joystick.

== Reception ==
In 1989, Dragon gave the game 3½ out of 5 stars.
