= Save New York =

1983 video game

- Developer(s): Creative Software
- Publisher(s): NA: Creative Software; EU: Creative Software
- Platform(s): Commodore 64
- Release: NA: 1983; EU: 1983
- Genre(s): Shoot 'em up
- Mode(s): Single-player, multiplayer

Commodore 64 screenshot

Save New York is shoot 'em up published on cartridge for the Commodore 64 by Creative Software in 1983. The player has to protect New York City from invading aliens. The game takes place on a single static screen with various skyscraper buildings and a subway tunnel running underneath them. At either edge of the screen is an airplane launching pad.

== Gameplay ==
The game can be played by one or two players. Player one has a white airplane and player two has a blue one. In a two-player game, both airplanes are on screen at the same time. During play, aliens resembling large spiders begin to descend from the sky, flying towards the buildings. If left alone, they will eat parts of the buildings, eventually causing them to collapse. The player has to shoot the aliens to stop them from eating the buildings. When all aliens on a level have been killed, the game progresses to the next level. The player earns bonus points for each apartment still left intact.

Another game element is a plane passing over the city from time to time dropping fuel canisters which the player has to catch to refuel his airplane.

When the airplane is landed on its launching pad, its pilot can descend down to the subway tunnel. There he has to avoid the subway trains which can crush him on contact. On later levels, some aliens drop eggs which hatch upon landing on the ground, revealing a little blue alien which descends down to the subway tunnel and heads towards the buildings' basement. If the alien reaches the basement, it will start eating it, eventually causing the whole building to collapse. Killing this alien usually requires visiting the subway tunnel.

The players' airplanes can also shoot the buildings and each other, but this is not beneficial towards completing the level.

== Reception ==
Ahoy! wrote that "The pace of Save New York is frantic, the action constant, and the gameplay enjoyable", especially with two players. The Commodore 64 Home Companion stated that cooperative play helped it avoid being "just another shoot-the-mutants game".
