= Speed King (1985 video game) =

- Commodore 64 cover
- Developers: Mervyn J. Estcourt (C64); Sculptured Software (Atari 8-bit); Shaun Southern (C16)
- Publishers: Digital Integration (C64); Mastertronic (all other versions)
- Platforms: Amstrad CPC, Atari 8-bit, Commodore 16, Commodore 64, MSX
- Release: 1985: C64; 1986: Atari 8-bit, C16, CPC, MSX
- Genre: Racing game
- Mode: Single player

Speed King is a motorcycle racing video game released in 1985 by Digital Integration for the Commodore 64 and in 1986, in a budget edition, by Mastertronic, for the Amstrad CPC, Atari 8-bit, Commodore 16, and MSX. It is a port of Full Throttle, released in 1984 for the ZX Spectrum and developed by the same person, Mervyn Estcourt.

Mastertronic also released a sequel for the ZX Spectrum, Speed King 2, in 1986.

== Gameplay ==
Speed King is a typical single-player racing game, in the style of Pole Position, with a perspective view from behind the motorcycle. You can select from ten real-world circuits, with the option to preview the track from a first-person perspective, as well as take test laps. Each game is a single race with 19 other opponents on the track, with three possible difficulty levels. The motorcycle has a six-speed manual transmission and can reach speeds of up to 250 miles per hour (mph). In ascending order of gear ratios, the maximum speeds are: 42, 56, 83, 144, 174, and 250 miles per hour. Colliding with an opponent or veering off the road causes you to fall off the motorcycle and restart from a standstill.

The Commodore 16 version is limited to four tracks, five laps, no skill levels, and you cannot control the speed; you can only change gears.

== Reception ==
MSX Computing said, "Motorcycle racing games are few and far between which is one of the reasons why I reckon this game will prove to be popular." While the UK edition of Zzap!64 gave the game 88%, and the US edition gave it 91%, the Italian edition gave it an overall score of 56%, saying it is similar "in many ways to Shaun Southern's Formula One Simulator", which is also one of the games he developed, released in 1985. Input MSX gave it 37 out of 50. ASM (Aktueller Software Markt) gave it 10 out of 10. Happy Computer gave it 68%. Commodore User said that "Speed King is alright as far as it goes but it adds nothing new to this type of game," and found that while the graphics were good, "especially when you bank," the controls were the only problem, being "a mite too sensitive." Ken McMahon of Commodore User later gave it a 4 out of 10. Amtix gave it 31% overall.
