= Warrior II =

1986 C64 video game

Warrior II is a 1986 video game for the Commodore 64. It is a sequel to Warrior.

== Gameplay ==
Warrior II is a game in which the player moves at very high speed through a futuristic complex using a rideable device that allows rapid directional changes and precise movement. The player travels through the environment, increasing speed with joystick input, sliding and spinning to navigate space. Progress involves hopping over obstacles, avoiding electrified fences, and using a laser to destroy targets. The objective is to descend through the complex to reach a computer at the bottom, where information left by the Ancients is stored.

== Reception ==
Zzap!64 said rated it 88% and called it "A must for Psi Warrior fans." Computer and Video Games said that Warrior II is "the most enjoyable of the Nexus games so far." Aktueller Software Markt gave it a 7 overall. Eugene Lacey for Commodore User said "it is definitely worth considering if you haven't got the original. Warrior II is not for the gamer of average ability however. You have to be determined – the blast fast brigade will love it."
