= Urban Upstart =

1983 video game

- Developer: Pete Cooke
- Publisher: Richard Shepherd Software
- Platforms: ZX Spectrum, Commodore 64
- Release: 1983
- Genre: Interactive fiction
- Mode: Single-player

Urban Upstart is a 1983 text adventure programmed by Pete Cooke and published by Richard Shepherd Software for the ZX Spectrum and Commodore 64. Urban Upstart is set in the fictional British town of Scarthorpe, a particularly grim town with high crime and unemployment rates. The protagonist begins in their house at three o'clock in the morning, with the objective of escaping from Scarthorpe.

== Gameplay ==
Trying to leave the protagonist's house

Urban Upstart is a text adventure in which the player types actions in verb-noun format. The upper half of the screen displays an illustration of the current location.

Typing in expletives results in the protagonist being arrested on obscenity charges and sent to a gaol.

Unlike Richard Shepherd Software's previous adventure, Invincible Island, Urban Upstart did not come supplied with a separate "help program". This was intended to take the pressure off the company with regards to giving hints, but only caused customer confusion. With Urban Upstart, Shepherd instead supplied help sheets to customers who wrote in asking for information.

== Reception ==
Urban Upstart received mixed criticism. Computer and Video Games found the scenario to be original, but was frustrated with the implementation. Some obvious nouns were not recognized (for example, "SHOP" outside a chip shop) and the illustrations took too long to draw, with no option of turning them off. The maze-like hospital and gaol locations were also seen as frustrating. Your Spectrum highlighted the game's graphics and recommended it as a good, entertaining adventure. CRASH magazine awarded 64%, finding the story to be a nice change from the usual fantasy setting, highlighting a large vocabulary and detailed (but slow) graphics. In contrast, Micro Adventurer found the vocabulary to be limited, with some occasionally confusing graphics, but recommended the game to those who can appreciate bleak humour. Sinclair User awarded 8 out of 10, finding the portrayal of Scarthorpe to be inventive and convincing.

Despite mixed reviews, Urban Upstart consistently sold well and was considered to be a memorable adventure.
