= Subsunk =

1985 video game

- Publisher: Firebird Software
- Designers: Peter Torrance; Colin Liddle
- Platforms: Amstrad CPC, Commodore 64, ZX Spectrum
- Release: 1985
- Genre: Interactive fiction
- Mode: Single-player

Subsunk is a text adventure game by Firebird released in 1985 for the Amstrad CPC, Commodore 64, and ZX Spectrum home computers.

== Plot ==
Ed Lines, reporter for the "Seafaring Gazette", is aboard the nuclear submarine Sealion for a routine patrol when the sub is attacked and disabled by a foreign power. The crew are taken into captivity and the sub scuttled - with the hidden journalist still aboard. He must alert headquarters with the news of what has happened and escape the doomed vessel.

== Gameplay ==
The game was produced with The Quill and includes simple graphics. The player must guide Ed Lines in his attempt to escape the stricken submarine; he must reach the telex room and issue the distress signal "SUBSUNK" to alert the authorities and bring assistance. Meanwhile, the wrecked submarine is filling with water...

It was followed by a sequel, Seabase Delta.

== Reception ==
- ZX Computing: "... a very enjoyable game, mainly because of its sense of humour"
- A 1992 Your Sinclair article described it as "possibly the worst of all the games that were around at the time."
