= Nobby the Aardvark =

1992 video game

- Developer: Genesis Software Developments
- Publishers: NA: Thalamus; EU: Thalamus
- Designers: Dave Clarke; Jonathan Smyth
- Programmer: Dave Clarke
- Artist: Johnathan Smyth
- Composer: Ashley Hogg
- Platform: Commodore 64
- Release: NA: 1992; EU: 1993
- Genre: Platform
- Mode: Single-player

Nobby the Aardvark is a platform game for the Commodore 64, published in 1992 by Thalamus.

== Gameplay ==
The first level

Nobby the Aardvark is a platform game taking place over multiple levels. The player takes the role of Nobby, an aardvark who eats ants. The game's plot involves Nobby trying to get to Antopia, a place where there are ants everywhere, so Nobby can eat.

In practice, the majority of the levels involve Nobby jumping from one platform to another to reach the exit. Various enemies inhabit the levels. Contact with an enemy is fatal to Nobby, but there are anthills scattered around the levels, and Nobby can spit the ants at enemies to defeat them. Later levels vary the gameplay by having Nobby fly in a hot air balloon or navigate a maze-like mine shaft.

== Reception ==
Zzap!64 gave Nobby the Aardvark a 96% rating, putting it in the "Gold Medal" category.

== See also ==
- The Ant and the Aardvark, a cartoon series
