= Starfox (1987 video game) =

First person shooter video game

- Starfox cover, ZX Spectrum version
- Developers: Realtime Games Software; Ian Oliver
- Publisher: Reaktor
- Designers: Gary Yorke; James Poole; Paul Crawley
- Platforms: ZX Spectrum, Amstrad CPC, Commodore 64
- Release: NA: 1987; EU: 1987
- Genres: Shoot 'em up, first-person shooter
- Mode: Single-player

Starfox is a video game published by Ariolasoft on their Reaktor label in 1987 for the ZX Spectrum, Commodore 64, and Amstrad CPC. The player assumes the role of Hawkins, a space fighter pilot charged with protecting the Hyturian star system from invading alien forces. The game uses wireframe and shaded vector graphics to depict combat, in a similar fashion to games such as Elite and Starstrike 2, which was also created by Realtime Games. Ariolasoft had previously published the Electronic Arts titles Skyfox and Arcticfox and the name was chosen to build on the success of those titles. The US Commodore 64 release was titled The Rubicon Alliance.

== Gameplay ==
The main cockpit view (ZX Spectrum version)

There are eight missions in all. The route taken can be mapped out by means of the "holocube", a 3D representation of the system, that can be zoomed and viewed from any angle. The holocube will also record the positions of planets and enemy convoys. Once the route is plotted the player may fast-forward to their destination.

The player pilots the Starfox craft from the main cockpit view, which also features three scanners showing views to the rear and sides. The "Mark 1 Laser" is aimed from here and is one of three weapons the ship is capable of carrying at any one time. As the game progresses the weapon systems can be upgraded by finding a planet and docking at its orbital space station, where damage can also be repaired. Fuel will deplete over time and at varying rates depending on how fast the ship is flown, and can only be replenished by locating and using a fuel ship.

Two logs are automatically kept, one that records the positions of dangers such as electron storms and ice storms, and details of enemy ships, and weapon details. The second is an autopilot log for helping navigate to logged planets.

== Reception ==
The game received a generally positive reception from the gaming press in 1987. CRASH praised the ZX Spectrum version for its "outstanding graphics" and concluded it was "very good if you put some effort into it", while Your Sinclair thought it "[a] disappointingly Elite-ish game ... seems very slow". Sinclair User commented that despite the game having "the ability to be excruciatingly infuriating", it was overall "a damned good shoot-out", and a "very high quality game".

Commodore User were less enthusiastic about the Commodore 64 version of the game; initially they experienced the game fun at first, but later as slow and boring.
