= Realms of Darkness =

1986 video game

- Developer: Strategic Simulations
- Publisher: Strategic Simulations
- Designers: Gary Scott Smith; Alex Duong Nghiem
- Platforms: Apple II, Commodore 64, MSX2, PC-88, PC-98, Sharp X1, X68000
- Release: 1986
- Genre: Role-playing
- Mode: Single-player

Realms of Darkness is a fantasy role-playing video game developed by Strategic Simulations and published in 1986. It was developed for the Apple II and Commodore 64.

== Plot ==
Realms of Darkness is a game in which is the player must complete seven different quests, exploring over 30 dungeon levels, and adventurers can go to several cities, shops, and wilderness areas.

== Release ==
In Japan, Realms of Darkness was released under the title Rogue Alliance (ローグアライアンス) by StarCraft in 1989, with versions for Japanese home computers including the PC-8801 and MSX2.

In a 2014 interview, former StarCraft employee Toshio Sato explained that the original English title was considered unlikely to appeal to Japanese consumers, leading to the selection of a new title derived from the game's story. Sato also recalled that Rogue Alliance appeared between fourth and 25th place in Japanese computer game popularity rankings between June and October 1989.

== Reception ==
SSI sold 9,022 copies of Realms of Darkness in North America. Computer Gaming World called the game "of only moderate interest" and described its graphics, quests, and puzzles as mediocre, but stated that the game might be suitable for a beginner to computer RPGs. COMPUTE! called Realms of Darkness "a well-planned product with several interesting features not previously implemented in a fantasy game. Most fantasy gamers will want to take a look". The game was reviewed in 1987 in Dragon #122 by Patricia Lesser in "The Role of Computers" column. Lesser felt the game "combines both the excitement and danger of a menu-driven fantasy role-playing game with the flexibility and thought-provoking requirements of a text-adventure game." The game was revisited in Dragon #124, where the reviewers stated that "Realms of Darkness is enjoyable (despite the mediocre graphics), and you’ll immerse yourself in its secrets for many, many hours."

James Delson of Family Computing gave the game a positive review, praising its complexity compared with the Ultima, Wizardry and Phantasie series. He highlighted the combat system, text-command interface, ability to divide the player's party and emphasis on puzzle-solving. Delson considered the game comparable to Wizard's Crown and recommended it to both experienced and novice role-playing game players.
