= Wizard Cup =

Wizard Cup may refer to:

- Australian Football League pre-season competition, formerly the Wizard Cup
- Queensland Cup, a rugby league football competition formerly known as the Queensland Wizard Cup
