= Werewolves of London (video game) =

1989 video game

- Developer: Viz Design
- Publisher: Mastertronic 1989, Ariolasoft 1987 Amstrad CPC
- Platforms: ZX Spectrum, Amstrad CPC, Commodore 64
- Release: 1987 Amstrad CPC 1989 Full release
- Genre: Arcade game
- Mode: Single-player

Werewolves of London is a video game released in 1989 for the ZX Spectrum, Commodore 64 and the Amstrad CPC. The game used the same engine as Viz Design's other game Frankenstein Junior that was released by Codemasters in the same year.

The game is set in London and the plot is to kill each of eight members of an aristocratic family who put a curse on the main character, resulting in his daily transformation into a werewolf.

== Gameplay ==
The game is played from a side-on 45-degree view, letting the player not only move left and right, but up and down; the character can also jump. The player starts off as a human who must roam the streets of London (including the London Underground and Hyde Park), and pick up items which will help with certain tasks. When the timer hits midnight, the player character transforms into a werewolf. The player must then track down each of the eight enemy characters and kill, and optionally, eat their bodies, while avoiding being shot or captured by the police.

The game involved more strategy elements than the traditional 8-bit platform game, as it changed mechanics and difficulty in response to the player's actions. For example, the more people that are attacked by the werewolf, the more active the police become. The Hyde Park location is locked during the night, and a ticket is needed to enter the subway. The Werewolf is sent to prison when 'touched' by a police officer with handcuffs. After the Werewolf transforms back into a human, the player can wait to be released or can break out with a crowbar and escape through the sewers (a torch is needed to see in the dark). Eating family members and non-playable characters gives extra health, but being shot results in a constant health drop (in the form of a blood-bag icon). Finding bandages can stem the blood flow. If the blood-bag reaches empty, the game is over.

== Release history ==
The game was originally intended to be full-price release from Ariolasoft" following their previous collaboration on Bride of Frankenstein. However, Ariolasoft withdrew from the UK market and only a very copies of the Amstrad CPC were made. The rights and code assets were subsequently acquired by Mastertronic, who published the game in 1989 as a budget title retailing for £1.99.

== Reception ==
Your Sinclair magazine said it "doesn't work at all – what was envisaged as an atmospheric arcade adventure ... is just an aimless chase-about". It received a front page spread and a full page preview in an earlier release.

The budget release of Werewolves of London reached number two in the Gallup All Formats chart in February 1989, kept off the number one spot by Mastertronic's re-release of Ghostbusters, which was their most successful budget re-release, selling over 450,000 copies.
