= WZRD =

WZRD may refer to:

- WZRD (band), an American alternative-pop rock duo
  - WZRD (album), the aforementioned band's self-titled debut album
- WZRD (FM), a radio station (88.3 FM) licensed to serve Chicago, Illinois, United States
