= Time Tunnel (1985 video game) =

1985 video game

- Developer: Applied Systems Engineering
- Publisher: U.S. Gold
- Platform: Commodore 64
- Release: NA: 1985; EU: 1985
- Genre: Adventure
- Mode: Single-player

Time Tunnel is an adventure game released for the Commodore 64 in 1985. The aim of the game is to teleport between different ages to solve puzzles, find "The Seven Scriptures" and become King of the Gnomes.

== Gameplay ==
The locations in the game are:

- The Gnome Mansion, where the time machine is assembled
- Stone Age, 9600 BC
- Magical Persia, 893 BC
- Mythological Greece, 86 BC
- Colonial Salem, Massachusetts, 1692 AD
- California Gold Rush, 1849 AD
- Intergalactic Spaceship, 3456 AD
- The Black Hole, 9999 AD

== Reception ==
In the UK, Zzap!64 gave the game an overall rating of 49% in April 1986, describing it as a "barely average arcade adventure"; the three reviewers were unimpressed with the game's graphics but enjoyed the "obscure obviousness" of the puzzles.

Commodore User also reviewed the game in April 1986, ranking it at 4/5 stars in most categories and describing it as "a highly entertaining puzzle package".

Your Computer gave the game an overall rating of 3/5 in April 1986, commenting that the complicated puzzle clues would "delight adventurers but merely frustrate others".

Your Commodore reviewed the game in May 1986, describing it as "an enjoyable arcade adventure".

In Finland, Printti reviewed the game in November 1986, giving it an overall rating of 3/5 and describing its graphics as inconsistent across the playable eras but never falling below moderate quality.

In Spain, Micromanía rated the game at 7/10 in April 1986, describing it as "a fun and addictive game for all".
