= Quo Vadis (video game) =

1984 video game

- Title screen
- Developer: The Edge
- Publisher: The Edge
- Designer: Steven T. Chapman
- Series: Quo Vadis
- Platform: Commodore 64
- Release: NA: 1984; EU: 1984
- Genre: Action-adventure game
- Mode: Single-player

Quo Vadis is an action-adventure game designed by Steven T. Chapman for the Commodore 64 and released by The Edge in 1984.

== Gameplay ==
The player explores a network of caverns in search of the Sceptre of Hope while avoiding enemies and lava pits. The character is controlled with a joystick and can move in four directions and jump diagonally. The player's weapon continuously fires in the direction of movement.

Riddles are hidden throughout the caverns and form part of a competition associated with the game. Players were required to locate the riddles, solve them and identify the location of the Sceptre of Hope. The Edge advertised the sceptre as being worth approximately £10,000. A January 1985 advertisement stated that a further £30,000 in cash would be awarded if the winning entry was received after the game's 100,000th copy had been sold.

== Reception ==
Quo Vadis received the Game of the Month award in the September 1984 issue of the UK magazine Personal Computer Games.
