= Robotfindskitten =

1997 video game

robotfindskitten
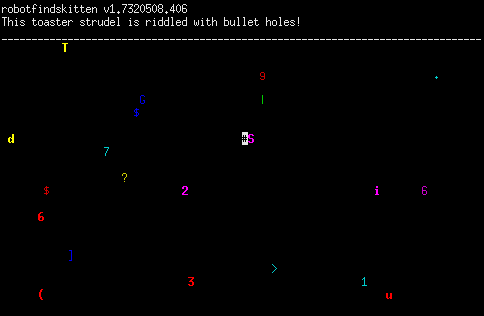
- Original author: Leonard Richardson
- Release: 1997
- Stable release: 2.8284271.702 / 1 March 2020; 6 years ago
- Written in: Assembly language, C/C++, Flash, Gambas, Inform, Java, JavaScript, PHP, Python, Scratch
- Platform: Amiga, Android, Apple II, Arduboy, Atari 2600, Atari 7800, Atmel AVR, Commodore 64, MS-DOS, Dreamcast, Game Boy Advance, Lego Mindstorms NXT, OS X, Maemo, Nintendo DS, Wii, Palm OS, PlayStation Portable, POSIX, QNX, Rockbox, TI-83 Plus, TI-99/4A, Z-machine, ZX Spectrum
- Available in: English
- Type: Game
- License: GPL v2 or later
- Website: http://robotfindskitten.org/
- Repository: github.com/robotfindskitten/robotfindskitten

robotfindskitten is a free video game originally written by Leonard Richardson for MS-DOS. The game uses ASCII interface in which the player, as the eponymous robot and represented by a number sign "#", must find a kitten (represented by a random character) on a field of other random characters.

== Gameplay ==
Walking up to items allows robot to identify them as either kitten, or any of a variety of "non-kitten items" with whimsical, strange, or random text descriptions. It is not possible to lose (though there is a patch that adds a 1 in 10 probability of the item killing the robot). Simon Carless has characterized robotfindskitten as "less a game and more a way of life ... It's fun to wander around until you find a kitten, at which point you feel happy and can start again".

== Ports ==
The game has been ported to and/or implemented on over 30 platforms, including POSIX, the Dreamcast, Palm OS, TI-99/4A, the Z-machine, the Sony PSP, Android, and many more. Graphical versions, such as an OpenGL version with # emblazoned on an otherwise featureless cube, also exist. Remakes are also used as programming tutorials, such as for Gambas.

In a 2023 study on automated translation of C programs into Rust, robotfindskitten was used as a benchmark program for the translation tools C2Rust and Crown. The study reported that the game's source code contains one raw pointer declaration but no raw pointer uses.
