= Snooker (video game) =

1983 video game

- Publisher: Visions Software Factory
- Programmer: Tim Bell
- Platforms: Acorn Electron, BBC Micro, Commodore 64, VIC-20, ZX Spectrum
- Release: 1983
- Genre: Sports
- Modes: Single-player, multiplayer

Snooker (sometimes referred to as Snooker '83) is a sports video game published by Visions Software Factory in 1983 and released for the Acorn Electron, BBC Micro, Commodore 64, VIC-20, and ZX Spectrum.

== Summary ==
This video game simulates snooker on the major home computers of that era. The players take turns to hit a white cue ball against the reds or colours following the rules of snooker. The strength of the shot and the spin can be selected using the space bar and cursor keys respectively.

The limited colour selections of the home computers of the time (often limited to 8 colours) along with the memory sizes (the VIC-20 version ran in less than 6K of RAM) meant the user experience was limited compared to more modern implementations.

There were also other games simply titled "Snooker" for the ZX Spectrum, including one release by Microbyte and Artic Computing Ltd also in 1983. The games were followed in 1984 by Steve Davis Snooker and Steve Davis World Snooker in 1985.

== Reception ==
The game received a mention in Zzap!64's first magazine issue in their list of "Top 10 Tackiest Top Sellers", where the game reached 6th place.
