= Soul of a Robot =

1985 video game

- Developers: Stephen N Curtis; Mark Jacobs
- Publisher: Mastertronic
- Platforms: Amstrad CPC, MSX, ZX Spectrum
- Release: 1985
- Genres: Platform, maze
- Mode: Single-player

Soul of a Robot is a video game sequel to Nonterraqueous for the ZX Spectrum, Amstrad CPC and MSX, released by Mastertronic in 1985. It is sometimes called Nonterraqueous 2.

== Plot ==
The attempt to destroy the rogue computer from Nonterraqueous failed. Now the computer threatens to self-destruct with old age, taking the planet Nonterraqueous with it. The people of the planet create another robot, one with the mind of a man. On a kamikaze mission to the computer's core, it must find the three keys to allow it to transport to the next section, before self-destructing inside the computer's core.

== Gameplay ==
Gameplay is different from the prequel Nonterraqueous. The robot that is controlled by the player does not "fly" like in the previous game, but leaps similarly to an ordinary platformer. However, the ability to fly is available in the game, and necessary to complete it. The robot still has a "psyche" value which decreases with certain actions and must not be allowed to drop to zero. The "laser" from the previous game also remains.

The game was considered much more difficult than its prequel, relying on perfectly timed and aimed jumps (the player is able to choose five "strengths" of jump) in order to progress, and enjoyed much less commercial success. The gameplay was much slower and jumps and flying could take a lot of time and effort to perform correctly. There also seemed to be a particular influence from Underwurlde in the gameplay and sounds used in the game.

Soul of a Robot was also a much smaller game, the map containing only a third as many individual screens as its prequel, with only 256 rooms.

== Reception ==
Reception

Review scores
Publication	Score
Amstrad Action	84%
Amtix	77%
Crash	75%

Soul of a Robot received positive reception from video game critics.
