= Streets of London (video game) =

1983 video game

- Cover art
- Developer(s): Grant Privett; Allan Webb
- Publisher(s): Supersoft
- Platform(s): Commodore 64
- Release: NA: 1983; EU: 1983
- Genre(s): Interactive fiction
- Mode(s): Single-player

Streets of London is a text adventure published for the Commodore 64 in 1983 by the British software publisher Supersoft. Originally released for the Commodore PET as Pythonesque, the game's humour is almost entirely derived from comedy troupe Monty Python.
