= Pitstop II =

1984 video game

- Developer: Epyx
- Publisher: Epyx
- Designers: Dennis Caswell; Stephen Landrum
- Platforms: Commodore 64, Atari 8-bit, Apple II, IBM PC, TRS-80 Color Computer
- Release: 1984: Atari, C64, IBM PC; 1985: Apple II, CoCo
- Genre: Racing
- Modes: Single-player, multiplayer

Pitstop II is a 1984 sequel to the 1983 racing game Pitstop, both of which were published by Epyx. Ported to more platforms than the original, Pitstop II was released for the Commodore 64, Atari 8-bit computers, and as a self-booting disk for IBM PC compatibles. Apple II and TRS-80 Color Computer versions were released in 1985. A Nintendo Entertainment System version was planned in 1986, but went unreleased.

Pitstop II adds a split-screen, simultaneous two-player game mode. Players can be in completely different places on the racing track, and each half of the screen shows the view of the track according to the player's position.

== Gameplay ==
Split-screen on the C64

The game requires that players keep an eye on their tires and fuel gauge. Players are able to pull in for a pit stop to change tires as well as re-fuel.

Six international race tracks are available: Brands Hatch, Hockenheim, Rouen-Les-Essarts, Sebring, Vallelunga, and Watkins Glen — with a choice of either racing for three, six or nine laps and from one of three difficulty levels.

== Reception ==
Zzap!64 called Pitstop II "Fantastic! ... a SUPERB implementation of the 3D racing format ... This has to be the best ever driving game".

IGN reviewed the Virtual Console release. They thought that the game was worth playing for nostalgic reasons but might not appeal to those unfamiliar with the title due to dated graphics, sound and controls. It was rated 6/10.

== Legacy ==
Pitstop II was re-released on the Wii Virtual Console in Europe on August 8, 2008, and in North America on February 23, 2009.
