= Nonterraqueous =

1985 video game

- Cover art of Nonterraqueous
- Developers: Stephen N Curtis; Mark Jacobs
- Publisher: Mastertronic
- Platforms: Amstrad CPC; Commodore 64; ZX Spectrum
- Release: 1985
- Genre: Maze
- Mode: Single-player

Nonterraqueous is a computer game for the Amstrad CPC, ZX Spectrum, and Commodore 64, released by Mastertronic in 1985.

== Gameplay ==
The player controls a robot (which resembles an eyeball) whose mission is to destroy the central computer currently in control of the planet Nonterraqueous. The robot has a "psyche" value which is reduced every time contact is made with a surface, requiring fine control over the robot's movements. Barring the way are enemies which can be shot with the robots lasers, "photon thrusters" (white barriers that pulsate and kill the robot instantly if they contact), and other obstacles, some of which can only be destroyed by finding a bomb and dropping it in the room.

Along the way, there are stations at which the robot can "recharge" its psyche, although some are deadly to use, and knowing which ones can only come from experience. There are also "SWAP" stations that allow the robot to transform into a form which doesn't allow shooting lasers but is invulnerable to some otherwise deadly obstacles. Also along the way is a long vertical corridor which is seemingly impassable until a rocket at the bottom of the vertical shaft is activated, catapulting the player up several dozens levels and through the barrier.

The overall size of the game was considered daunting for the time, consisting of 1004 separate locations.

== Reception ==
Reception

Review scores
Publication	Score
Crash	77%
Zzap!64	48%

== Sequel ==
A sequel to the game exists and is called Soul of a Robot; the gameplay is quite different.
