= Road to Moscow =

1984 video game

- Publisher(s): Ba'rac Limited
- Platform(s): Commodore 64
- Release: 1984
- Genre(s): Strategy

Road to Moscow is a 1984 video game published by Ba'rac Limited.

== Gameplay ==
Road to Moscow is a game in which the Russian Front of World War II is simulated in a strategic level game.

== Development ==
The game's designer was Phil Gardocki. The game was developed by Ba'rac Limited, a company that was based in Shreveport, Louisiana.

== Reception ==
Bill Wise reviewed the game for Computer Gaming World, and stated that "The combination of ease of play, interesting scenarios, an excellent game system, and numerous strategic options will keep me playing RTM for a long time to come."

Compute!'s Gazette praised the game saying "It is one of the best computer war games available" that simulates one of the most interesting wars of all time.
