= Spooks (video game) =

1985 video game

- North American cover art
- Publishers: NA: Mastertronic; EU: Mastertronic
- Designer: Nigel P. Johnstone
- Platform: Commodore 64
- Release: NA: 1985; EU: 1985
- Genre: Puzzle
- Mode: Single-player

Spooks is a puzzle video game written for the Commodore 64 by Nigel P. Johnstone and published by Mastertronic in 1985.

== Gameplay ==
The game begins with the protagonist inheriting a mansion from his recently deceased aunt but unknown to him, it is haunted by four ghosts called Gizzy, Wuzzy, ZingZong, and Struke. In order to banish these ghosts forever, he has to collect eight music boxes and carry them to the exit. Once they're all assembled, they will play Chopin's Funeral March thus winning the game.

The protagonist enters the mansion at 11:50pm and his first task is to set the clocks back before they strike midnight and all the ghosts rise. He then has to hunt around the mansion avoiding the various traps and haunted rooms. If the protagonist does encounter a ghost, he can throw a heavy object (such as a bed, heavy weight, table) at the ghost to stun it.

The main game music is Grande Valse Brillante by Chopin.
