= Your Commodore =

British magazine

- Issue 1, October 1984
- Former editors: Wendy Palmer; Stuart Cooke; Rik Henderson; Jeff Davy
- Categories: Computer magazine
- Frequency: Monthly
- First issue: October 1984
- Final issue Number: October 1991; 84
- Company: Argus Specialist Publications; Alphavite Publications
- Country: United Kingdom
- Language: English
- ISSN: 0269-8277

Your Commodore was a magazine for Commodore computers, including the Commodore 64, Amiga, and the Commodore PC range. It was published in the UK from October 1984 until late 1989 when the name was shortened to YC. The final issue was in October 1991.

== History ==
Although first seen as a supplement in July 1984's Personal Computer Today, Your Commodore was later published on its own. Issue 1 launched in September, cover dated October 1984. Launch editor Wendy Palmer introduced the magazines plans for its content, which would include general coverage for all the Commodore computers. Features mainly covered programming, hardware and business software, but there was also a small dedicated games section.

November 1985's issue cover had the addition of Your 64 logo on the cover and the editor; Stuart Cooke's intro announced that Your Commodore had incorporated Your 64.

The first major redesign of the magazine occurred in the January 1987 issue. The layout and the cover logo were both changed from the familiar look.

== YC ==
First cover of YC's re-launch issue

At the end of 1989, the magazine was re-launched as YC and dispensed with the technical side of the market to concentrate on games. The new YC, cover dated January 1990, included a regular cover cassette which had demos and complete games. General content changed drastically, relying on comic writing throughout with regular columns such as Oozin' Eugene and Post Apocalypse.

The final issue was October 1991.
