= Pitstop (video game) =

1983 video game

- Commodore 64 cover art
- Developer(s): Epyx
- Publisher(s): Epyx
- Series: Pitstop
- Platform(s): Atari 8-bit, Commodore 64, ColecoVision, Coleco Adam
- Release: Atari 8-bit, C64, ColecoVision: November 1983; Adam: 1983
- Genre(s): Racing
- Mode(s): Single-player

Pitstop is a 1983 racing video game developed and published by Epyx for the Atari 8-bit computers, ColecoVision, Coleco Adam, and Commodore 64. It was followed by Pitstop II in 1984.

== Gameplay ==
Gameplay screenshot (Atari 8-bit)

Pitstop is played from a semi-first-person perspective, placing the player in a bird's-eye perspective slightly behind a race car. The game features three difficulty modes and three gameplay modes: Single, Mini-Circuit, and Grand Circuit. In Single, the player can choose from one of six tracks and learn how to play the game. In the game's Circuit modes, the player races against other drivers and earns a certain number of points and money depending on the place he finishes in each race. The Mini-Circuit features only three tracks, while the Grand Circuit features all six.

Pitstop implements pit stops, a concept not featured in many other contemporary racing video games. Color-based damage is shown on the player's car whenever it hits another vehicle or a wall on the track, both of which wear out the tires. The player also has a fuel meter that gradually depletes during each race. If the player's vehicle displays a red color from taking too much damage, or if it is running low on fuel, it must make a pit stop. Unlike other racing video games, the pit crew is fully controlled by the player, who must refuel the vehicle and replace its worn-out tires. Up to four players can play by taking alternating turns.

The ColecoVision version uses the ColecoVision Expansion Module #2 steering wheel and pedal peripheral.

== Reception ==
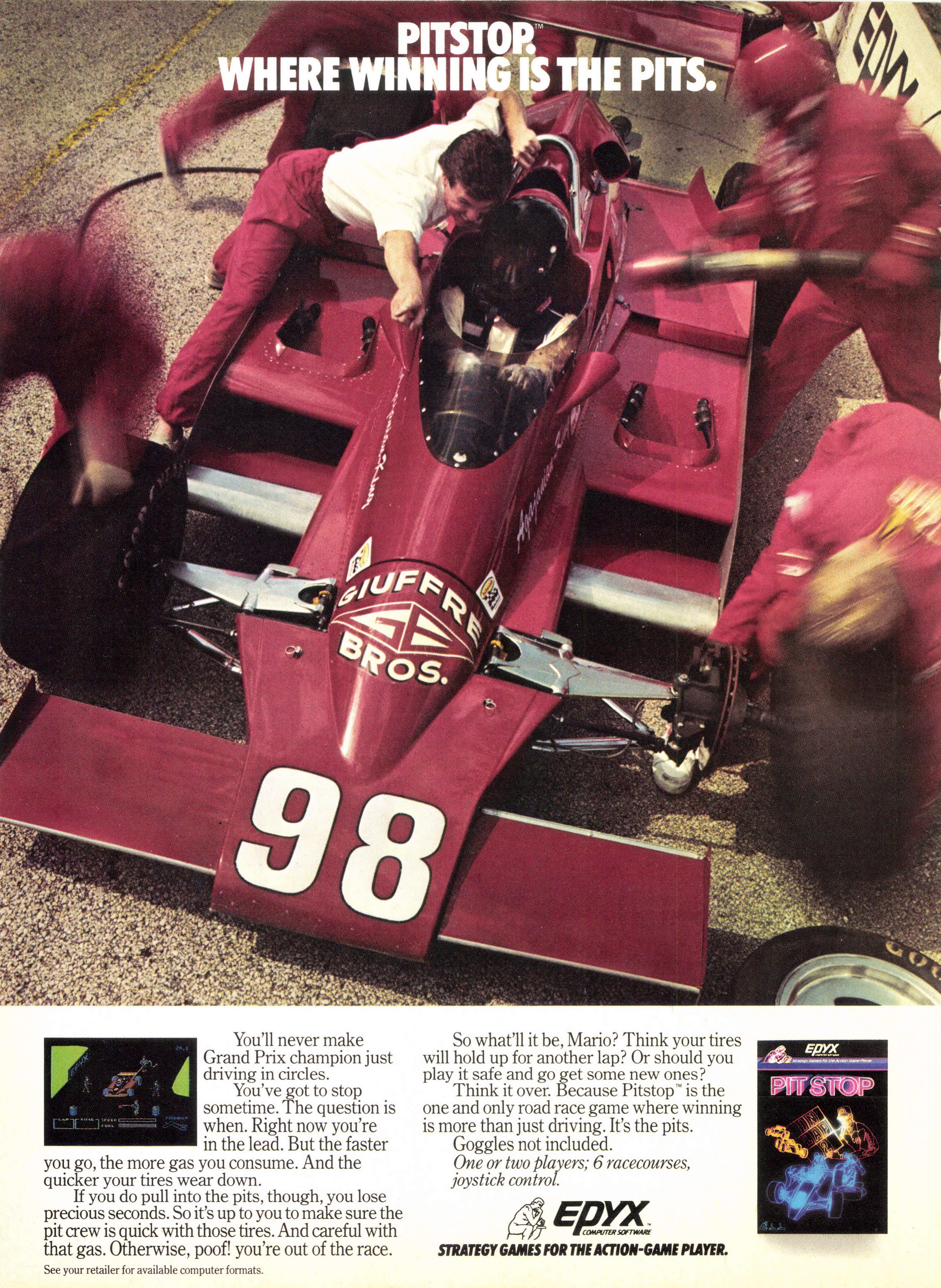
Printed advertisement for the game.

The Commodore 64 Home Companion noted that the game's pit stop feature "slows the action down, but it adds an element of strategy (Can I make it around again without blowing out that right-front tire?) to what would otherwise be just another eye-hand coordination game." Roy Wagner of Computer Gaming World felt that Pole Position was a superior racing game, and wrote that Pitstop "is the pits because that is where the race is won or lost."

Computer Fun gave the game 2.5 out of 4 and wrote that "fantasy is a fragile thing and the reality of Pitstop is something less than harrowing, as the driver finds when he braces himself for an outrageous switchback only to find it as tame as a suburban boulevard. Disappointingly, the six 'unforgiving' tracks merely blend into a pureed sameness. Graphically, the cars are done in fine style but the trackside scenery consists of green flatlands and an occasional bush or sign. […] As for gameplay, Pitstop is at its best in the more difficult settings where things are a little more hectic and the side-to-side motion of the cars add challenge."

Ted Salamone of Electronic Games reviewed the Commodore 64 version and wrote, "The engine rev sounds are realistic, the pit screen unforgettable, and the action absolutely hair-raising." Stephen Reed of Hi-Res wrote that Pitstop "does not have the extended playability or good graphics" of Pole Position. Reed called the game's pit stop concept a "unique feature", but wrote, "While this is an interesting aspect to the program, its attractiveness is short lived because the pits soon become an obstacle to racing."

Shay Addams of Compute! praised the game's "exciting competition and action" and its pit stop feature, writing that the game "requires strategy and split-second decision-making that are missing in other racing games." Addams wrote that Pitstop was more enjoyable when playing with others, and noted that the game's graphics were not as detailed as Pole Position, but concluded, "Since veteran race car drivers agree that many professional races are won in the pits, not on the track, Pitstop has to be one of the most realistic and playable racing simulations available."
