= List of Codemasters video games =

Codemasters is a British video game developer and formerly publisher founded by David and Richard Darling in 1986 and became a subsidiary of Electronic Arts in 2021. The headquarter of the studio is set in Southam, Warwickshire, while the company's 3 subsidiaries are set in Birmingham and Kuala Lumpur, Malaysia. The company was known for developing and publishing racing titles such as Colin McRae Rally, Micro Machines and TOCA. The company also released several other games in other genres, such as the action role-playing series Overlord, the tactical shooter series Operation Flashpoint and the Brian Lara Cricket series. In 2008, the company acquired the rights to develop and publish licensed Formula 1 video games. In the same year, the company acquired Sega Racing Studio from Sega and Codemasters Birmingham from Swordfish Studios.

== List of video games ==
Year	Name	Genre	Platforms	Source
1986	Super Robin Hood	Platform	Amiga, Amstrad CPC, ZX Spectrum, C64, Atari ST, NES	
1986	BMX Simulator	Racing	Amiga, Atari 8-bit, Atari ST, Amstrad CPC, C64, MSX, ZX Spectrum	
1987	Ghost Hunters	Platform	Amstrad CPC, C64, ZX Spectrum	
1987	Grand Prix Simulator	Racing	Amstrad CPC, C64, ZX Spectrum, Atari 8-bit	
1987	Dizzy – The Ultimate Cartoon Adventure	Adventure, platform	C64, Amstrad CPC, ZX Spectrum	
1987	Professional Ski Simulator	Sports	Amstrad CPC, ZX Spectrum, C64 Atari ST, Amiga	
1987	Red Max	Action	Atari 8-bit, C64	
1987	3D Starfighter	Shooter	Amstrad CPC, ZX Spectrum	
1987	ATV Simulator	Sports	ZX Spectrum, C64, Amstrad CPC	
1988	Rock Star Ate My Hamster	Simulation	ZX Spectrum, C64, Amstrad CPC, Atari ST, Amiga	
1988	Jet Bike Simulator	Sports	ZX Spectrum, C64, Amstrad CPC, Atari ST, Amiga	
1988	Fruit Machine Simulator	Simulation	ZX Spectrum, Atari 8-bit, C64, Amstrad CPC, Atari ST, Amiga	
1988	The Race Against Time	Adventure	Amstrad CPC, ZX Spectrum, C64	
1988	Pro BMX Simulator	Sports	Amstrad CPC, ZX Spectrum, C64	
1988	International Rugby Simulator	Sports	Amstrad CPC, Atari ST, ZX Spectrum, C64	
1988	Advanced Pinball Simulator	Pinball	Amstrad CPC, Atari 8-bit, ZX Spectrum, C64	
1988	Treasure Island Dizzy	Adventure, platform	Amstrad CPC, ZX Spectrum, C64, Enterprise 64/128, Amiga, Atari ST, MS-DOS, NES, Amiga CD32	
1989	Championship Jet Ski Simulator	Sports	Amstrad CPC, ZX Spectrum, C64, Atari ST, Amiga	
1989	4 Soccer Simulators	Sports	Amstrad CPC, C64, ZX Spectrum	
1989	BMX Simulator 2	Sports	Amstrad CPC, C64, ZX Spectrum	
1989	Turbo Chopper Simulator	Simulation	Amstrad CPC	
1989	Fast Food	Maze	Amstrad CPC, ZX Spectrum, C64, Enterprise 64/128, Atari ST, Amiga, MS-DOS	
1989	Grand Prix Simulator II	Racing	Amstrad CPC, C64, ZX Spectrum	
1989	Operation Gunship	Action	Amstrad CPC, C64, ZX Spectrum	
1989	MiG-29: Soviet Fighter	Shoot 'em up	Amstrad CPC, C64, ZX Spectrum, Amiga, Atari ST, NES	
1989	Fantasy World Dizzy	Adventure, platform	Amstrad CPC, ZX Spectrum, C64, Enterprise 64/128, Amiga, Atari ST, MS-DOS	
1989	750cc Grand Prix	Racing	Amstrad CPC, ZX Spectrum	
1990	Pro Boxing Simulator	Sports	Amiga, Atari ST, C64	
1990	The Ultimate Stuntman	Action	NES	
1990	Kwik Snax	Maze	Amstrad CPC, C64, ZX Spectrum, Amiga, Atari ST, MS-DOS	
1990	Bubble Dizzy	Platform	Amstrad CPC, C64, ZX Spectrum, Amiga, Atari ST, MS-DOS	
1990	Dizzy Panic	Puzzle	Amstrad CPC, ZX Spectrum, C64, Master System, Game Gear	
1990	Italia 1990	Sports	Amiga, Atari ST	
1991	Slightly Magic	Action-adventure	Amiga, Amstrad CPC, Atari ST, C64, ZX Spectrum	
1991	Seymour Goes to Hollywood	Adventure, platform	Amiga, Amstrad CPC, Atari ST, C64, MS-DOS, ZX Spectrum	
1991	Spellbound Dizzy	Adventure, platform	Amiga, Amstrad CPC, Atari ST, C64, ZX Spectrum, Amiga CD32	
1991	Tilt	Puzzle	C64, ZX Spectrum	
1991	Magicland Dizzy	Adventure, platform	Amstrad CPC, C64, ZX Spectrum	
1991	Paris to Dakar Rally	Racing	ZX Spectrum	
1991	Miami Chase	Vehicular combat	ZX Spectrum	
1991	FireHawk	Action	NES, Atari ST, Amiga	
1991	Big Nose the Caveman	Platform	NES, Amiga, Atari ST	
1991	Dizzy Down the Rapids	Action	Amstrad CPC, ZX Spectrum, C64, Amiga, Atari ST, MS-DOS	
1991	Fantastic Dizzy	Adventure, platform	NES, MS-DOS, Master System, Sega Genesis, Amiga, Game Gear, Amiga CD32	
1991	Micro Machines	Racing	Amiga, NES, Master System, Sega Genesis, MS-DOS, CD-i, Xbox	
1991	CJ's Elephant Antics	Platform	ZX Spectrum, C64, Atari ST, Amiga, NES	
1992	Steg	Platform	Amiga, Amstrad CPC, Atari ST, C64, MS-DOS, ZX Spectrum	
1992	Captain Dynamo	Platform	Amiga, Amstrad CPC, Atari ST, C64, MS-DOS, ZX Spectrum	
1992	Linus Spacehead's Cosmic Crusade	Adventure, platform	NES	
1992	Crystal Kingdom Dizzy	Adventure, platform	Amstrad CPC, ZX Spectrum, C64, Amiga, Atari ST, MS-DOS, Amiga CD32	
1992	Big Nose Freaks Out	Action	NES	
1992	Bee 52	Action	C64, NES	
1992	Robin Hood: Legend Quest	Platform	Atari ST, Amiga	
1992	Slicks	Racing	C64, ZX Spectrum (compilation only)	
1992	Wild West Seymour	Adventure, platform	Amstrad CPC, C64, ZX Spectrum	
1992	Stuntman Seymour	Adventure, platform	Amstrad CPC, C64, ZX Spectrum	
1992	Sergeant Seymour: Robotcop	platform	Amstrad CPC, C64, ZX Spectrum	
1992	Super Seymour	platform	Amiga, Amstrad CPC, Atari ST, C64, ZX Spectrum	
1993	The Excellent Dizzy Collection	Adventure, platform	Master System, Game Gear	
1994	Micro Machines 2: Turbo Tournament	Racing	Sega Genesis, MS-DOS, Game Gear	
1994	Psycho Pinball	Pinball	Sega Genesis, MS-DOS	
1994	Capt'n Havoc	Platform	Sega Genesis, Arcade	
1994	Pete Sampras Tennis	Sport	Sega Genesis	
1995	Sampras Tennis 96	Sport	Sega Genesis	
1996	Pete Sampras Tennis '97	Sport	MS-DOS, PlayStation, Windows	
1996	The Realm Online	MMORPG	Windows	
1996	Brian Lara Cricket '96	Sports	Sega Genesis, Windows, Amiga	
1997	Micro Machines V3	Racing	PlayStation, Windows, Nintendo 64	
1997	Jonah Lomu Rugby	Sports	Windows, PlayStation, Sega Saturn	
1997	TOCA Touring Car Championship	Racing	Windows, PlayStation	
1998	Colin McRae Rally	Racing	Windows, PlayStation, Game Boy Color	
1998	Music	Music	PlayStation	
1998	Brian Lara Cricket	Sports	PlayStation, Windows	
1999	TOCA 2: Touring Cars	Racing	PlayStation, Windows	
1999	No Fear Downhill Mountain Biking	Sports	PlayStation, Game Boy Color	
1999	Music 2000	Music	PlayStation, Windows	
2000	Pro Pool	Sports	Game Boy Color	
2000	Micro Maniacs	Racing	PlayStation, Game Boy Color	
2000	TOCA World Touring Cars	Racing	PlayStation, Game Boy Advance	
2000	Mike Tyson Boxing	Sports	PlayStation	
2000	Colin McRae Rally 2.0	Racing	PlayStation, Windows, iOS	
2000	Cannon Fodder	Shoot 'em up	Game Boy Color	
2000	Insane	Racing	Windows	
2001	Severance: Blade of Darkness	Action role-playing, hack and slash	Windows	
2001	MTV Music Generator 2	Music	PlayStation 2	
2001	Operation Flashpoint: Cold War Crisis	Tactical shooter	Windows	
2002	Mike Tyson Heavyweight Boxing	Sports	PlayStation 2, Xbox	
2002	Prisoner of War	Stealth	Windows, Xbox	
2002	Operation Flashpoint: Red Hammer	Tactical shooter	Windows	
2002	Operation Flashpoint: Resistance	Tactical shooter	Windows	
2002	Colin McRae Rally 3	Racing	PlayStation 2, Xbox	
2002	TOCA Race Driver	Racing	PlayStation 2, Xbox, Windows	
2003	Downhill Domination	Racing	PlayStation 2	
2003	I.G.I.-2: Covert Strike	Tactical shooter	Windows	
2003	IndyCar Series	Racing	Windows, PlayStation 2, Xbox	
2003	American Idol	Rhythm	Windows, PlayStation 2, Game Boy Advance	
2004	Colin McRae Rally 04	Racing	Xbox, Windows	
2004	Street Racing Syndicate	Racing	PlayStation 2, Xbox	
2004	TOCA Race Driver 2	Racing	Windows, PlayStation 2, PlayStation Portable, Xbox	
2004	England International Football	Sports	PlayStation 2, Xbox	
2004	IndyCar Series 2005	Racing	PlayStation 2, Xbox	
2004	MTV Music Generator 3	Music	PlayStation 2, Xbox	
2004	Soldiers: Heroes of World War II	Real-time tactics	Windows	
2004	Perimeter	Real-time strategy	Windows	
2004	Second Sight	Action-adventure, stealth	Windows, PlayStation 2, Xbox, GameCube	
2005	Worms 4: Mayhem	Artillery, strategy	Windows, PlayStation 2, Xbox	
2004	Colin McRae Rally 2005	Racing	Xbox, Windows	
2004	Manchester United Soccer 2005	Sports, simulation	Windows	
2005	Heroes of the Pacific	Combat flight simulation	PlayStation 2, Windows, Xbox	
2005	Operation Flashpoint: Elite	Tactical shooter	Xbox	
2005	Brian Lara International Cricket 2005	Sports	Windows, PlayStation 2, Xbox	
2006	Race Driver 2006	Racing	PlayStation Portable	
2006	RF Online	MMORPG	Windows	
2006	TOCA Race Driver 3	Racing	Windows, PlayStation 2, Xbox, PlayStation Portable	
2006	Micro Machines V4	Racing	Windows, PlayStation 2, PlayStation Portable, Nintendo DS	
2006	Dance Factory	Music	PlayStation 2	
2006	ArchLord	MMORPG	Windows	
2006	Rainbow Islands Revolution	Platform	Nintendo DS, PlayStation Portable	
2006	Bubble Bobble Revolution	Platform	Nintendo DS	
2006	Bubble Bobble Evolution	Platform	PlayStation Portable	
2007	Super Fruit Fall	Puzzle	Wii	
2007	Maelstrom: The Battle for Earth Begins	Real-time strategy	Windows	
2007	Heatseeker	Combat flight simulation	PlayStation 2, Wii, PlayStation Portable	
2007	Hospital Tycoon	Business simulation	Windows	
2007	Colin McRae: Dirt	Racing	Windows, PlayStation 3, Xbox 360	
2007	Overlord	Action-adventure	Windows, Xbox 360	
2007	Rafa Nadal Tennis	Sports	Nintendo DS	
2007	Race Driver: Create & Race	Racing	Nintendo DS	
2007	Brian Lara International Cricket 2007	Sports	Windows, Xbox 360, PlayStation 2	
2007	Brian Lara 2007 Pressure Play	Sports	PlayStation Portable	
2007	Clive Barker's Jericho	First-person shooter	Windows, PlayStation 3, Xbox 360	
2007	Impossible Mission	Platform	Nintendo DS, Wii	
2007	Sensible World of Soccer	Sports	Xbox 360	
2007	The Lord of the Rings Online	MMORPG	Windows	
2008	Overlord: Raising Hell	Action-adventure	Windows, PlayStation 3, Xbox 360	
2008	Turning Point: Fall of Liberty	First-person shooter	Windows, PlayStation 3, Xbox 360	
2008	Bliss Island	Puzzle	Xbox 360, Windows, PlayStation Portable	
2008	Dirty Dancing: the Video Game	Puzzle	Windows	
2008	Emergency Mayhem	Racing, action	Wii	
2008	Race Driver: Grid	Racing	Windows, PlayStation 3, Xbox 360, Nintendo DS	
2008	James Pond: Codename Robocod	Platform	Nintendo DS	
2008	Bella Sara	Life Simulation, puzzle	Nintendo DS, Windows	
2008	You're in the Movies	Party	Xbox 360	
2008	The Lord of the Rings Online: Mines of Moria	MMORPG	Windows	
2008	Rise of the Argonauts	Action role-playing	Windows, PlayStation 3, Xbox 360	
2009	Leisure Suit Larry: Box Office Bust	Action-adventure	Windows, PlayStation 3, Xbox 360	
2009	Damnation	Third-person shooter	Windows, PlayStation 3, Xbox 360	
2009	Fuel	Racing	Windows, PlayStation 3, Xbox 360	
2009	Overlord: Minions	Puzzle	Nintendo DS	
2009	Overlord: Dark Legend	Action role-playing	Wii	
2009	Overlord II	Action role-playing	Windows, PlayStation 3, Xbox 360	
2009	Ashes Cricket 2009	Sports	PlayStation 3, Wii, Xbox 360, Windows	
2009	Colin McRae: Dirt 2	Racing	Nintendo DS, PlayStation 3, PlayStation Portable, Wii, Xbox 360, Windows	
2009	Operation Flashpoint: Dragon Rising	Tactical shooter	Windows, PlayStation 3, Xbox 360	
2009	Dragonology	Edutainment	Nintendo DS	
2009	Need for Speed: Shift	Racing	Windows, PlayStation 3, Xbox 360, PlayStation Portable, J2ME, iOS, BlackBerry OS, Bada, Android, Symbian, MeeGo	
2009	F1 2009	Racing	Wii, PlayStation Portable	
2010	F1 2010	Racing	Windows, PlayStation 3, Xbox 360	
2010	International Cricket 2010	Sports	PlayStation 3, Xbox 360	
2011	Dirt 3	Racing	Windows, PlayStation 3, Xbox 360, macOS	
2011	Operation Flashpoint: Red River	Tactical shooter	Windows, PlayStation 3, Xbox 360	
2011	Bodycount	First-person shooter	PlayStation 3, Xbox 360	
2011	F1 2011	Racing	Windows, PlayStation 3, Xbox 360, Nintendo 3DS, PlayStation Vita	
2011	Dizzy: Prince of the Yolkfolk	Adventure, platform	iOS	
2012	Dirt: Showdown	Racing	Windows, PlayStation 3, Xbox 360, Linux	
2012	F1 2012	Racing	Windows, PlayStation 3, Xbox 360	
2012	F1 Race Stars	Kart racing	Windows, PlayStation 3, Xbox 360	
2013	Colin McRae Rally	Racing	iOS, Android, macOS, Windows	
2013	Grid 2	Racing	Windows, PlayStation 3, Xbox 360, macOS	
2013	F1 2013	Racing	Windows, PlayStation 3, Xbox 360	
2013	F1 Race Stars: Powered Up Edition	Kart racing	Wii U	
2014	Grid Autosport	Racing	Windows, PlayStation 3, Xbox 360, Linux, macOS, Nintendo Switch	
2014	F1 2014	Racing	Windows, PlayStation 3, Xbox 360	
2014	Toybox Turbos	Racing	Windows, PlayStation 3, Xbox 360	
2015	F1 2015	Racing	Windows, PlayStation 4, Xbox One, Linux	
2015	Overlord: Fellowship of Evil	Action role-playing	Windows, PlayStation 4, Xbox One	
2015	Dirt Rally	Racing	Windows, PlayStation 4, Xbox One, Linux, macOS	
2016	F1 2016	Racing	Windows, PlayStation 4, Xbox One, macOS	
2017	Micro Machines World Series	Racing	Windows, PlayStation 4, Xbox One	
2017	Dirt 4	Racing	Windows, PlayStation 4, Xbox One, Linux, macOS	
2017	F1 2017	Racing	Windows, PlayStation 4, Xbox One, Linux, macOS	
2018	Onrush	Racing	PlayStation 4, Xbox One	
2018	F1 2018	Racing	Windows, PlayStation 4, Xbox One	
2019	Dirt Rally 2.0	Racing	Windows, PlayStation 4, Xbox One	
2019	F1 2019	Racing	Windows, PlayStation 4, Xbox One	
2019	Grid	Racing	Windows, PlayStation 4, Xbox One, Stadia	
2020	F1 2020	Racing	Windows, PlayStation 4, Xbox One, Stadia	
2020	Dirt 5	Racing	Windows, PlayStation 4, PlayStation 5, Xbox One, Xbox Series X/S	
2021	F1 2021	Racing	Windows, PlayStation 4, PlayStation 5, Xbox One, Xbox Series X/S	
2022	Grid Legends	Racing	Windows, PlayStation 4, PlayStation 5, Xbox One, Xbox Series X/S, Nintendo Switch 2, Meta Quest 2, Meta Quest Pro	
2022	F1 22	Racing	Windows, PlayStation 4, PlayStation 5, Xbox One, Xbox Series X/S	
2023	F1 23	Racing	Windows, PlayStation 4, PlayStation 5, Xbox One, Xbox Series X/S	
2023	EA Sports WRC	Racing	Windows, PlayStation 5, Xbox Series X/S	
2024	F1 24	Racing	Windows, PlayStation 4, PlayStation 5, Xbox One, Xbox Series X/S	
2025	F1 25	Racing	Windows, PlayStation 5, Xbox Series X/S	

=== Cancelled games ===
- Dragon Empires
- Jumpgate Evolution
- Heist
- The Outsider
- Crash Club
