= The Dizzy Collection =

1990 video game

- Multiformat flyer for The Dizzy Collection
- Developers: Big Red Software; Codemasters; Oliver Twins
- Publisher: Codemasters
- Designer: The Oliver Twins
- Platforms: Amstrad CPC, ZX Spectrum, Commodore 64, Amiga, Atari ST
- Release: 1990
- Genres: Adventure, Arcade, platform
- Mode: Single-player

The Dizzy Collection is a 1990 game compilation published by Codemasters for the Amstrad CPC, ZX Spectrum, Commodore 64, Atari ST and Amiga platforms. The compilation includes the games Dizzy, Treasure Island Dizzy, Fantasy World Dizzy, Fast Food and a new game Magicland Dizzy.

The Amiga and Atari ST versions of the compilation substitute Kwik Snax in place of Dizzy, which was not released on those platforms at the time.

== Dizzy's Excellent Adventures ==
Dizzy's Excellent Adventures
- Multiformat flyer for Dizzy's Excellent Adventures
- Developers: Big Red Software; Codemasters; Oliver Twins
- Publisher: Codemasters
- Designer: The Oliver Twins
- Platforms: Amstrad CPC, ZX Spectrum, Commodore 64, Amiga, Atari ST
- Release: 1991
- Genres: Adventure, Arcade, platform
- Mode: Single-player

A follow up, Dizzy's Excellent Adventures was released in 1991 which included Spellbound Dizzy, Dizzy Panic (also called 'Panic Dizzy'), Bubble Dizzy, Kwik Snax and a new game Dizzy Prince of the Yolkfolk. It was released for the Amstrad CPC, ZX Spectrum, Commodore 64, Amiga and Atari ST.

A console-only compilation The Excellent Dizzy Collection was released in limited quantities for the Game Gear in 1993.
