= Aladdin Deck Enhancer =

1992 video game console peripheral

- Aladdin Deck Enhancer, with Dizzy the Adventurer
- Developer: Codemasters, Camerica
- Type: Hardware accessory
- Released: 1992
- Platform: Nintendo Entertainment System

The Aladdin Deck Enhancer is a system-enhancing adaptor to use Compact Cartridges on the Nintendo Entertainment System. It was produced by Camerica and developed by Codemasters but not licensed by Nintendo. It is similar to the Datach system for the Famicom, but without the Barcode feature. It was released in November 1992, with its planned library to reach a total 24 games by the end of 1993. However, only seven games were actually released. The device had low sales and Camerica went bankrupt in 1993.

== Hardware ==
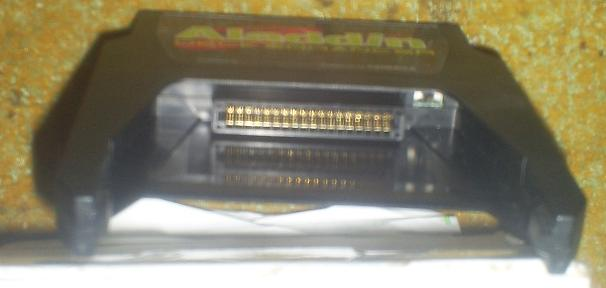
Aladdin Deck Enhancer connection and switch

Invented by Richard Darling, the Aladdin Deck Enhancer contains a bypass Security Circuit Chip, a Memory Control Chip, and a Graphics Chip, which work with the lock-out chip and other features inside the Nintendo Entertainment System. First, the Compact Cartridge is inserted into the Aladdin Deck Enhancer, which is shaped the same as a standard NES cartridge, and then this is inserted into the Control Deck. Inside the slot where the Compact Cartridge is placed is a recessed switch, which changes the Security/Region settings from position A to position B. The device contains 8 kilobytes of RAM for graphics use.

The device allowed Camerica to make cheaper game cartridges by sharing more of the requisite componentry of each cartridge: 10NES lock-out chip, RAM, and extra circuitry. Its design used to bypass the 10NES lockout chip prevented it from working on almost any NES variants except the Front Loader model, including any Famiclone released. However, by the time the product was released the next generation of consoles were already released as the Super NES and Mega Drive/Genesis. By then, the Aladdin lacked a sizable market base to warrant making a large game library, and Camerica was soon forced to close.

Dizzy Prince of the Yolkfolk by Codemasters, designed by the Oliver Twins, was enhanced for the NES release and retitled Dizzy the Adventurer and originally bundled with the Aladdin released in November 1992. It is the only Aladdin game not released on a normal-sized NES cartridge. Only another six games were ever released, all primarily from the Codemasters library. More games were listed as "Coming Soon", but never released as Aladdin cartridges. CJ's Elephant Antics was not released as a standalone game but is part of the Quattro Arcade NES cartridge, which contains three other games.

Aladdin games are typically identical to their standalone counterparts with a few exceptions. The Fantastic Adventures of Dizzy is the only one with any improvement: a faster character, changed items system, 250 instead of 100 stars to collect, and other smaller changes.

== Games ==
Each game for the Aladdin Deck Enhancer comes in a small cardboard box with a punched out hole at its top for it to be hung on a peg. Instead of the typical instruction booklet with many stapled pages, it has a fold-out brochure or poster.

Big Nose Freaks Out: This is the second of two games starring Big Nose, in addition to Big Nose the Caveman. Both are platform adventure games. In this adventure he rolls along on his wheel board, which is somewhat like a skateboard but with only one wheel, holding his trusty club and the occasional rocks. Bones are considered money in his time and Big Nose has gotten all his bones stolen, and must journey through this prehistoric land and get them back.

Dizzy the Adventurer: Dizzy is an egg-shaped hero with red boots and gloves. In this sixth game in the Dizzy series, Dizzy and Daisy are tricked into entering an old castle by the Evil Wizard Zaks. There, Daisy pricks her finger and falls into a mysterious sleep, while Dizzy is imprisoned. He must escape and find a way to wake his girlfriend, but along the way he must solve many puzzles by bringing the right item to the right place.

The Fantastic Adventures of Dizzy: An award-winning game by Codemasters, and the seventh game in the Dizzy series. Dizzy must rescue his kidnapped girlfriend and help the rest of the Yolkfolk. Along the way, he must face numerous dangers, collect stars to get into the castle and solve various puzzles.

Linus Spacehead's Cosmic Crusade: This is Linus's second adventure for the Aladdin Deck Enhancer; the other is on the Quattro Adventure cartridge. Linus is home at last on his own planet Linoleum. He must get a car and camera, go back to Earth, take pictures and then return home. It is part click-and-move adventure/puzzle and part side-scroller platform game.

Micro Machines: This is a licensed product of the Micro Machines toy line. It is a racing game where the player controls miniature cars that drive over household environments such as tables, floors, a sandbox, and a bathtub.

Quattro Adventure: This is a cartridge of four adventure-platform games.

- Boomerang Kid was lost in the outback when his parents were camping with him in the outback. Fortunately, he was rescued from a hungry dingo by Aboriginal Australian people who took him in and raised him as their own. Now grown up, Boomerang Kid wishes to repay their kindness, and the opportunity arises when their boomerang store is raided. Boomerang Kid begins a quest to retrieve every last boomerang before he will return.
- Super Robin Hood: Robin Hood must save his beloved Marion by searching the castle for keys and switches while avoiding guards and other obstacles.
- Treasure Island Dizzy is the second game in the Dizzy series. Dizzy the hero goes sailing one day, gets lost in a storm, and finds himself on a mysterious island. He must discover all the coins located on the island and then figure out how to get off the island, all the while solving various puzzles.
- Linus Spacehead, while in a race, has crashed his spaceship into the Earth and needs to get back home. He must pick up the pieces of his radio so he can signal home. He is only able to jump and duck as he moves through the various levels while being attacked by things such as fish, birds, coconuts, and bats.

Quattro Sports: This is a cartridge of four sports games.

- Baseball Pro's [sic] is a worldwide baseball game where the player competes against teams from around the world with one or two players.
- Soccer Simulator is a top view soccer game where the player competes against teams from around the world with one or two players.
- Pro Tennis is a tournament-based game with a two player option.
- BMX Simulator is a licensed product of the BMX sports bike line, where the player controls a bicycle rider in a top view looking down at the track, similar to Super Sprint.

== Unreleased games ==
The following games were announced, but were canceled or released on standard NES cartridges.

- Bee 52
- Big Nose the Caveman
- CJ's Elephant Antics
- DreamWorld Pogie
- F16 Renegade
- Go! Dizzy Go!
- Metal Man
- Mig 29 Soviet Fighter
- Stunt Kids
- Team Sports Basketball
- The Ultimate Stuntman

== See also ==
- List of Nintendo Entertainment System accessories
