= Quattro compilations =

Quattro is a series of video game compilations (each with four games) released in the 1990s. They consisted of games developed by Codemasters. The NES versions were released as multicarts and were published by Camerica without a license by Nintendo.

== Quattro Sports ==
Quattro Sports
- NES cover art
- Developer: Codemasters
- Publisher: Camerica
- Series: Quattro
- Platforms: Amstrad CPC, Commodore 64, Nintendo Entertainment System, ZX Spectrum
- Release: 1990
- Genre: Sports
- Mode: Single-player

Quattro Sports (Super Sports Challenge in Europe) is a video game compilation made by Codemasters and released for the Nintendo Entertainment System (NES), Amstrad CPC, Commodore 64 and ZX Spectrum. The NES version was not licensed by Nintendo. It features four sports games, Tennis Simulator, BMX Simulator, Soccer Simulator, and Baseball Pros on the NES or BMX Simulator, Grand Prix Simulator, Professional Ski Simulator and Professional Snooker Simulator on the other systems.

== Quattro Arcade ==
Quattro Arcade
- Developer: Codemasters
- Publisher: Camerica
- Platforms: Nintendo Entertainment System, Commodore 64
- Release: 1992
- Genre: Platform
- Mode: Multi-player

Quattro Arcade is a collection of four platform and action video games released for the NES and Commodore 64 in 1992. It is made up of:

- CJ's Elephant Antics, a platformer similar to The NewZealand Story.
- Stunt Buggies, a maze driving game similar to Rally-X.
- F16 Renegade, a shoot-em-up game.
- Go! Dizzy Go!, a platformer and part of the Dizzy series.

== Quattro Adventure ==
Quattro Adventure
- Developer: Codemasters
- Publisher: Camerica
- Platforms: NES, Commodore 64
- Release: 1991
- Genre: Platform
- Mode: Single-player

Quattro Adventure (Super Adventure Quests in Europe) is a collection of four platform action video games released for the NES and Commodore 64 in 1991.

It contains the following games:

- Linus Spacehead: Linus, an alien from the planet Linoleum, has crash landed on Earth and needs to gather up all of his scattered radio parts in order to radio home for help. The game received a standalone sequel, Linus Spacehead's Cosmic Crusade.
- Super Robin Hood: Robin Hood must fight his way through Nottingham Castle while avoiding a multitude of traps to successfully rescue Maid Marian.
- Boomerang Kid: The Boomerang Kid must retrieve all of his boomerangs scattered throughout the outback.
- Treasure Island Dizzy: Dizzy finds himself stranded on an island and must figure out how to get home.

== Quattro Coin-Ops ==
Quattro Coin-Ops
- Developer: Codemasters
- Publisher: Codemasters
- Platforms: Amstrad CPC, Commodore 64, ZX Spectrum
- Release: 1990
- Genre: Arcade
- Mode: Single-player

Quattro Coin Ops is a collection of four arcade type video games released for the Amstrad CPC, Commodore 64 and ZX Spectrum in 1991.

It contains the following games:

- Advanced Pinball Simulator
- Pub Trivia
- Fruit Machine Simulator
- Fast Food: Dizzy is running around in various mazes munching food and avoiding monsters in a Pac-Man style arcade game.

== Quattro Adventures Vol. 2 ==
Quattro Adventures Vol. 2
- Developer: Codemasters (France)
- Publisher: Megastar Joystick
- Platform: Atari ST
- Release: 1990
- Genre: Platform
- Mode: Single-player

Quattro Adventures Vol. 2 is a collection of four platform action video games released for the Atari ST in 1990.

It contains the following games:

- Treasure Island Dizzy: Dizzy finds himself stranded on an island and must figure out how to get home.
- Little Puff in Dragonland
- The Sword and the Rose
- Spellfire the Sorcerer

== Quattro Dizzy Adventures Vol. 10 ==
Quattro Dizzy Adventures
- Developer: Codemasters (France)
- Publisher: Megastar Joystick
- Platform: Amstrad CPC

Quattro Dizzy Adventures is a collection of four platform action video games released for the Amstrad CPC in 1990.

It contains the following games:

- Treasure Island Dizzy: Dizzy finds himself stranded on an island and must figure out how to get home.
- Dizzy: Dizzy has found a stone slab with the instructions on how to destroy the evil wizard Zaks and liberate the land of Katmandu.
- Fast Food: Dizzy is running around in various mazes munching food and avoiding monsters in a Pac-Man style arcade game.
- Fantasy World Dizzy: Dizzy's girlfriend Daisy has been captured and locked in a tower by the king's guards and it's up to Dizzy to break free from his cell and rescue her.

== Quattro Power Machines ==
Quattro Power Machines
- Developers: Codemasters, Optimus Software
- Publisher: Codemasters
- Platforms: Amiga, Atari ST
- Release: 1993
- Genres: Racing game, shoot 'em up
- Mode: Single-player

Quattro Power Machines is a collection of four driving and shoot 'em up games released for the Amiga and Atari ST in 1993.

It contains the following games:

- Violator: A vertical scrolling shoot-em-up, the player flies a helicopter through a terrain full of enemies. Planes fly at the player in formation. Turrets are capable of firing in eight directions in order to attack player.
- Nitro Boost Challenge: In this action driving game, the player must drive through five different stages, including a car chase, a boat race, a forest rally, and jumping the Grand Canyon. This game was originally called Super Stuntman and was released on the Commodore 64.
- Super Grand Prix: The updated 16-bit version of Codemasters' Grand Prix Simulator. The game now has four different modes of play. The player can race with Formula 1 cars, compete in drag racing, ride motorbikes, as well as use a variety of vehicles in the fourth mode, including go-carts, police cars, and a tank (which is mostly only useful to shoot other cars and act as a blockade against those behind the player). Up to six cars can participate in a race, and each race can be three, four, or five laps. Four people can race against each other, with two on keyboard and two with joysticks.
- Pro Powerboat Simulator: This is a boat racing game more than a simulator, in which the player must use their power boat to compete against other boaters on water-based tracks, using bridges, bombs and the player's very boat against others. Ramps can be used to skim over the top of other racers, and bombs can be placed in order to gain points as they explode when other players run over them. The player must pick up extra fuel and bombs without crashing into the bank. The player must also avoid a helicopter which flies overhead and drops bombs.
