= Magicland Dizzy =

1990 video game

- Commodore 64 cover art for Magicland Dizzy
- Developers: Big Red Software; Codemasters; Oliver Twins
- Publisher: Codemasters
- Designers: Neal Vincent; The Oliver Twins
- Platforms: Amstrad CPC, ZX Spectrum, Commodore 64, Amiga, Atari ST, MS-DOS
- Release: EU: 1990; (Amstrad CPC, Spectrum, Commodore 64, Atari ST and Amiga): EU: 1992; (MS-DOS)
- Genres: Adventure, platform
- Mode: Single-player

Magicland Dizzy is a 1990 platform adventure game developed by Big Red Software and published by Codemasters for the Amstrad CPC, ZX Spectrum, Commodore 64, Atari ST and Amiga platforms and initially only available as part of The Dizzy Collection. By 1992 the game was sold by itself and an MS-DOS version was available. It is the sixth game in the Dizzy series, and the fourth adventure-based Dizzy title. The story, set in a fantasy world called Magicland, follows on from the events of Fantasy World Dizzy, the previous adventure title. In Magicland Dizzy the player controls Dizzy, an egg-shaped character, who is trying to save six of his friends who have been placed under spells by the Evil Wizard Zaks.

The game was the first Dizzy game not to be developed entirely by Dizzy's creators, the Oliver Twins. Instead, whilst they were focusing on other projects, Magicland Dizzy was designed by Neal Vincent and coded by external developer Big Red Software. The Oliver Twins retained design-approval oversight.

The game is sometimes alternatively known by its development title, Dizzy 4, with the Roman numeral IV visible at the top of the game screen, behind the player's score. A prequel, Into Magicland, was released to promote the game and featured a new character that was never seen in any of the series games again. The game was widely acclaimed by critics across the platforms with scores typically in the 80–95% region. Criticism was leveled at its similarity to previous games in the series and the awkward inventory system. By November 1991 the Dizzy games had sold more than half a million units across all platforms. A NES version titled Wonderland Dizzy was developed in 1993; it was released in October 2015.

== Gameplay ==
In Magicland Dizzy the player guides Dizzy, an egg-shaped character, in an attempt to rescue his six friends who are held captive under the influence of various magic spells. The locations are all located in the titular "Magicland" and are fantastical in nature, many inspired by fairy tales. They include a field of standing stones called Weirdhenge, a witch's island and Prince Charming's castle. Movement from one screen to the next is enabled through flip-screen such that when Dizzy touches the outer edge of one screen he is transported to the next. The individual screens consist of platforms and ladders with Dizzy able to both walk and jump to navigate the maze and its obstacles. Dizzy can collect up to three items at once which are then used at specific locations to solve puzzles and advance through the game. At the start of the game the player has three lives and a health bar which can be replenished by finding and collecting diamonds scattered throughout the maze.

== Plot and characters ==
The Evil Wizard Zaks, the primary antagonist of the series, whom Dizzy defeated previously in Fantasy World Dizzy, has returned having "made certain arrangements against his premature demise". He has cast spells on six members of the Yolkfolk, egg-shaped friends and relations of Dizzy, and transported them to Magicland. At the beginning of the game Dizzy teleports himself to Magicland and must set about lifting the spells from his friends.

Following their introduction in Fantasy World Dizzy, this game again features the Yolkfolk. Each of them has had a spell cast upon them by Zaks: Dylan is transfigured into a thorny bush; Denzil is frozen in ice; Dozy is put into an enchanted and perhaps everlasting sleep; Dora is turned into a frog; Daisy is enlarged and imprisoned inside Zaks' oubliette; and Grand-Dizzy trapped inside a magic mirror.

Throughout the game Dizzy meets and interacts with many of Magicland's inhabitants. These include the Queen of Hearts, the good witch Glenda and Prince Charming, along with various other creatures who can help or hinder Dizzy's progress. During the course of the game Dizzy comes across the legendary sword Excalibur and has the opportunity to awaken Sleeping Beauty.

== Development and promotion ==
Magicland Dizzy was the first Dizzy game that was not fully designed and coded by the Oliver Twins, the creators of Dizzy. After Fantasy World Dizzy they had started working more closely with Codemasters, developing games for the American market where the Nintendo Entertainment System (NES) was quickly capturing a large audience. In order to continue the Dizzy series, which remained popular in Codemasters' home market, the Twins had to bring in others to do the majority of the design and coding. This gave them time to concentrate on their other projects. The coding of Magicland Dizzy was contracted out to Big Red Software.

Initially Magicland Dizzy was only available as part of a five-game compilation called The Dizzy Collection which also featured Dizzy, Treasure Island Dizzy, Fantasy World Dizzy and Fast Food. The game was later released separately.

=== Dizzy 3 and a half ===
In order to promote Magicland Dizzy, a five screen mini-adventure for the ZX Spectrum known as Into Magicland (or, unofficially, Dizzy 3 and a half or Dizzy 3.5) was given away with the January 1991 edition of Crash, a UK-based magazine. It featured Dizzy and his cousin Danny and is a prequel to the main game, ending with Dizzy teleporting to the first screen of Magicland Dizzy. This was the character Danny's only appearance in a Dizzy game. The game's design was carried out by Big Red Software and The Oliver Twins. Programming was done by R. Fred Williams. Graphics were created by Neil Adamson, and publishing was handled by Codemasters, in collaboration with Crash Magazine.

== Remake ==
Title screen of Wonderland Dizzy

Wonderland Dizzy is a platform adventure game developed in 1993 and later released in October 2015 by the Oliver Twins for the Nintendo Entertainment System (NES). The Oliver Twins had previously released several games for the NES, published by Camerica for both the Aladdin Deck Enhancer and later sold as standalone non-licensed cartridges. Camerica also released the Codemasters-designed Game Genie cartridge, distributed in the US by Galoob and the subject of Lewis Galoob Toys, Inc. v. Nintendo of America, Inc.

Like many of the Dizzy games ported to the Nintendo Entertainment System, Wonderland Dizzy is an enhanced remake of a previously released Dizzy game – Magicland Dizzy, albeit with an Alice in Wonderland theme. As in Magicland Dizzy, the aim of the game is rescuing the other members of The Yolkfolk who have been placed under spells by the Evil Wizard Zaks, but Wonderland Dizzy allows the player to play as Dizzy, Daisy or control both characters.

Wonderland Dizzy was previously rejected for The Excellent Dizzy Collection.

The game source code was discovered by The Oliver Twins in October 2015. The game was released for online emulated gaming and for free download.

== Reception ==
Reception

Review scores
Publication	Score
Amstrad Action	85%
Crash	92%
Your Sinclair	90%
Amiga Power	84%
Zzap!64	83%

Award
Publication	Award
Crash	Crash Smash

Magicland Dizzy was met with a largely positive reception, although some magazines did not review it upon its inclusion in The Dizzy Collection. Writing in Your Sinclair, Rich Pelley gave the Spectrum version a positive review, describing it as "addictive" and "a bit of a spanker". Crash described the Spectrum version of the game as "one of the best [Dizzy games] so far" and an "essential purchase". The gameplay was described as being very similar to the previous games in the series though the Crash review still praised the addictive nature of the game and the colourful graphics and sounds. Writing in Amstrad Action, Adam Waring described the Amstrad version of the game as a "challenge even to those who've completed all the other Dizzy games".

In their review of the Commodore 64 version of the game, Zzap! noted that the slower pace of the game compared to the Spectrum version made "exploration a bit tedious at times" but still praised the game overall. Your Sinclair's Rich Pelley described the game's "annoying menu system" as a minor negative point. In his review in Amstrad Action, Adam Waring noted that the background music "becomes annoying" and that "not as many gameplay enhancements" had been made compared to previous games in the series. In contrast, Stuart Campbell's review in Amiga Power described the Amiga version of the game as "the most accomplished game in the series so far" and noted that by November 1991 the Dizzy games had sold more than half a million units across all platforms. The ZX Spectrum version was voted the 12th best game of all time in a special issue of Your Sinclair magazine in 2004.
