= Captain Dynamo =

Captain Dynamo may refer to:

- Captain Dynamo (character), a comic book superhero
- Captain Dynamo (video game), a platform game that was released for the Commodore Amiga and other platforms in 1992, developed by Codemasters
