= Rebellion Warwick =

British video game developer

- Formerly: Radiant Worlds Limited (2013–2017)
- Company type: Subsidiary
- Industry: Video games
- Predecessor: Blitz Games Studios
- Founded: 2013; 12 years ago
- Founder: Philip Oliver; Andrew Oliver; Richard Smithies
- Headquarters: Leamington Spa, England
- Products: SkySaga: Infinite Isles
- Owner: Rebellion Developments
- Parent: Rebellion Developments (2018–present)

Rebellion Warwick (formerly Radiant Worlds Limited) is a British video game developer based in Leamington Spa, England.

It was founded in 2013 almost immediately after the closure of Blitz Games Studios. The former owners of that company, the Oliver Twins, Andrew and Philip Oliver, along with COO Richard Smithies started Radiant Worlds, and were reported to have recruited up to 50 former Blitz staff.

Following the cancellation of their first game, SkySaga: Infinite Isles, in August 2017, the company expected to make a large number of staff redundant.

On 8 January 2018, it was announced that the studio had been acquired by Rebellion Developments and would henceforth be known as Rebellion Warwick.
