= Big Red Software =

British video game developer (1989–1996)

The Big Red Software Company Limited
- Trade name: Big Red Software
- Company type: Private
- Industry: Video games
- Founded: 16 October 1989; 35 years ago
- Founder: Paul Ranson
- Defunct: 31 May 1996
- Fate: Merged into Eidos Interactive
- Headquarters: Leamington Spa, England

The Big Red Software Company Limited, doing business as Big Red Software, was a British video game developer based in Leamington Spa, England. It was founded by Paul Ranson in October 1989.

== History ==
Big Red Software was incorporated on 16 October 1989 by Paul Ranson, and was based in Leamington Spa, England. In their early years, they focused on the 8-bit home computer game market, especially for ZX Spectrum and Amstrad CPC. During this time, they formed a close relationship with Codemasters, who published many of their games. This relationship was sufficiently close that Codemasters turned to them to develop the next Dizzy game after the series' creators, the Oliver Twins, moved onto other projects. The resulting game, Magicland Dizzy, was a critical and commercial success. When Retro Gamer released a special retrospective edition of Your Sinclair in 2004, they rated it the 12th best game for ZX Spectrum of all time. Other games released in collaboration with Codemasters include further Dizzy games, the Seymour series, and the PC port of Micro Machines.

In the mid-1990s, as the industry moved away from the older 8-bit computers, Big Red Software started developing games such as Tank Commander and Big Red Racing for MS-DOS, with both these titles being published by Domark. On 25 September 1995, publicly traded Eidos Public Limited Company acquired Domark and Big Red Software, alongside Simis, for a total of £12.9 million. The latter two were merged into Domark to create Eidos Interactive on 31 May 1996.

== Games developed ==
Year	Title
1990	Wacky Darts
1990	Raster Runner
1990	NY Warriors
1990	Magicland Dizzy
1991	Fun School 4
1991	Dizzy Panic
1991	Seymour Goes to Hollywood
1991	Spellbound Dizzy
1991	Super Seymour Saves the Planet
1991	Kamikaze
1991	CJ's Elephant Antics
1991	CJ in the USA
1991	Dizzy: Prince of the Yolkfolk
1992	Wild West Seymour
1992	Steg the Slug
1992	Grell and Fella
1992	Sergeant Seymour: Robot Cop
1994	CJ: Elephant Fugitive
1994	Pete Sampras Tennis
1994	Sink or Swim
1994	Dropzone
1994	Micro Machines
1995	Tank Commander
1995	Big Red Racing
