= Linus Spacehead's Cosmic Crusade =

1992 video game

- Developers: Codemasters (NES); Supersonic Software
- Publishers: Camerica (NES); Codemasters
- Composer: Allister Brimble (NES)
- Platforms: NES, Amiga, MS-DOS, Game Gear, Master System, Genesis
- Release: NES: NA: 1992; EU: 1993; Amiga, MS-DOS, Game Gear, Master System, Genesis: NA: November 1993 (GG & MD only); EU: November 1993
- Genres: Adventure, platform
- Mode: Single-player

Linus Spacehead's Cosmic Crusade is a video game released in 1992 by Codemasters for the Nintendo Entertainment System. A remake of the game, retitled Cosmic Spacehead, was released in 1993 for Amiga, MS-DOS, Game Gear, Master System, and Genesis. The game features adventure elements, with locations connected by platform sections.

The game is the sequel to Linus Spacehead, which was released exclusively as part of the compilation Quattro Adventure.

== Plot ==
Linus is an alien from the planet Linoleum who crashed into the legendary planet Earth. After returning home and expecting a hero's welcome, Linus soon found his fellow Linomen were skeptical of the existence of the so-called "planet Earth" and decides to return to it, this time with a camera. However he has no money and must adventure around the planet to acquire a vehicle and a camera. In his adventures, Linus leaves Linoleum using a fake ID for Larry Flynt to compete in a bumper car contest, quashes a robot revolution in Detroitica and gets gas from an abandoned space station.

== Gameplay ==
The game is a point-and-click adventure game in which items must be collected and later used in specific locations in order to progress. The player's character is directed during much of the game with the use of a cursor and written commands. It also includes numerous short platforming sections, as well as other mini-games and puzzles.

Each major location of Planet Linoleum has a teleporting device which can be activated using a card but they often leave Linus with a side-effect, required to complete a puzzle. To travel between adventure sections Linus goes through arcade sections where he has to reach the other side of the level, avoiding free falls, enemies and collecting Cosmic candy. After collecting 10, an extra life is added. Passwords are scattered at key locations.

== Licensing ==
Like other Codemasters games, the NES versions were not licensed by Nintendo. Linus Spacehead's Cosmic Crusade was released both as a stand-alone cartridge and as one of seven games for the Aladdin Deck Enhancer. At least in Europe, a later/updated version of the game was released as Cosmic Spacehead. There are several differences between that and the earlier version. Cosmic Spacehead includes the Pie Slap mode and Linus can jump higher and change direction in mid-jump which makes the platform arcade sections easier. The Mega Drive version was also included in a Codemasters "2-in-1" cartridge with Fantastic Dizzy.

All but Linus Spacehead's Cosmic Crusade include a two player mode named Pie Slap, reminiscent of Armor Ambush for the Atari 2600. While the Master System and Game Gear versions are similar in graphics to the NES version, the gameplay is closer to the remaining versions. In the Amiga, Mega Drive and MS-DOS versions the art style is different from the NES version.

== Reception ==
GamePro described the Game Gear version as "a great point-and-click text adventure", additionally praising the cartoonish charm of the graphics.
