= Little Puff in Dragonland =

1989 video game

- ZX Spectrum cover art
- Developer: Consult Software
- Publisher: Codemasters
- Platforms: Amiga, Amstrad CPC, Atari ST, Commodore 64, ZX Spectrum
- Release: UK: 1989
- Genre: Action
- Mode: Single-player

Little Puff in Dragonland is a 1989 platformer video game developed by Consult Software and published by Codemasters for personal computers. Upon release, the game received mixed reviews, with critics considering the game had value as a budget title, but was too similar to other Codemasters platformers, including Dizzy. A sequel, DJ Puff, was released by Codemasters in 1992.

== Gameplay ==
Gameplay in the Atari ST version of Little Puff in Dragonland.

The game is a platformer where players are Puff, a dragon, navigating levels to collect four envelopes to assemble a passport to travel home to see his family in Dragon Land. Players explore the levels, avoiding enemies, and collecting power-ups including magic potions and food to restore energy, or revolvers and air pumps to shoot projectiles or jump higher. However, players only have one life, and can only hold three items for use at a time. The game features puzzles where players must collect and use the items in the correct location to pass by or remove enemies or obstacles.

== Reception ==
Reception

Review scores
Publication	Score		
Publication	Amiga	C64	ZX
Aktueller Software Markt		6.1/10	
Your Sinclair			83%
Amiga Joker	65%		

Little Puff in Dragonland peaked in eleventh place in UK Gallup sales charts for the Amiga. Reviews were mixed, with several critics feeling the game was largely similar to the Dizzy series of Codemasters games. Amiga Joker considered the game's graphics, sound and handling to be "decent" for a budget title, praising the "relatively complex" level design, although felt the difficulty was "enormous" due to only having one life. Your Sinclair considered the game to be "colorful" and "cute" and value for money as a budget title, but felt the game was a "rip-off" of the Dizzy series.

== See also ==
- 1989 in video games
