= The Excellent Dizzy Collection =

1993 video game

- Developer: Interactive Studios
- Publisher: Codemasters
- Designer: Oliver Twins
- Series: Dizzy
- Platform: Game Gear
- Release: November 1993
- Genres: Action, puzzle
- Mode: Single-player

The Excellent Dizzy Collection is a video game compilation published by Codemasters in November 1993. The title includes three games, based on the video game character Dizzy created by the Oliver Twins. The compilation contains Dizzy the Adventurer, Panic Dizzy and the previously unreleased Go! Dizzy Go! Ports were slated for release in January 1994 for Master System and Mega Drive, but only the Game Gear version saw release, and only in Europe.

== Games ==
=== Dizzy the Adventurer ===
Dizzy the Adventurer is an enhanced version of the previously released Dizzy Prince of the Yolkfolk that was bundled with the Aladdin Deck Enhancer for the Oliver Twins’ publisher (Codemasters/Camerica) ill-fated NES peripheral. The title had not previously been released on the Sega platforms so was originally going to be released as a stand-alone game but publisher Codemasters was uncomfortable releasing it at full price.

=== Panic Dizzy ===
The game was originally released as a stand-alone product, Dizzy Panic!, for the Amstrad CPC, ZX Spectrum and Commodore 64, but was later included as a last-minute replacement for Wonderland Dizzy. Codemasters felt that two adventure games should not be included on the one compilation, so the Oliver Twins decided to leave Dizzy the Adventurer and replace Wonderland Dizzy (which was eventually released in October 2015) with Panic Dizzy to complement the other two game styles.

=== Go! Dizzy Go! ===
Unreleased box art for Go! Dizzy Go!

Go! Dizzy Go! was originally to be released on the NES for the Aladdin; due to its unexpected failure, the title was then planned for release as a stand-alone title for the Master System and Game Gear. The publisher, Codemasters, was uncomfortable releasing it separately at full price, so included it as part of The Excellent Dizzy Collection. The game is an action-puzzle game where the player must navigate the Dizzy through a series of mazes similar to the Adventures of Lolo games.

Quattro Arcade, released for the NES in 1992, includes Go! Dizzy Go!

== Development ==
After the failure of the Aladdin Deck Enhancer, Camerica was forced to close down, and Codemasters was in financial trouble. As a result, many staff left the Oliver Twins’ software company, Interactive Studios, who were unable to find replacements. Dizzy the Adventurer was the pack-in game bundled with the Aladdin, and three other titles were being developed for it; Dreamworld Pogie, Go! Dizzy Go! and Wonderland Dizzy. After the Aladdin was abandoned, the Oliver Twins decided to release all four (when completed) on the Sega Master System and Sega Game Gear to bring in some extra revenue, but Codemasters wasn't comfortable releasing each as a full-priced stand-alone title, so forced them to combine the games into a compilation, although only three would fit. They abandoned the non-Dizzy-oriented game, Dreamworld Pogie, and intended to release the action game Go! Dizzy Go! and the two adventure games Wonderland Dizzy and Dizzy the Adventurer. Codemasters marketing team informed the Olivers that they couldn't release two adventure games on the one compilation. They decided that the previously released Dizzy the Adventurer was the stronger title and didn't require any further development and, as a replacement for Wonderland Dizzy, the twins included the previously released Panic Dizzy.

After The Excellent Dizzy Collection was released, the Oliver Twins left Codemasters for another publisher, and with the intellectual property split between Codemasters and the Oliver Twins, no more Dizzy games were produced, although both companies have since said they would like to revisit the series. Wonderland Dizzy was eventually released in 2015. Dreamworld Pogie remained unreleased until 2011 when an alpha build was somehow leaked online. An official release of the game finally occurred in 2017, following a successful Kickstarter campaign from the original creators.

== Reception ==
Sega Magazine found the compilation to be good value.
