= Dizzy (series) =

- The Logo of the Franchise
- Genres: Adventure, platform, puzzle
- Developers: The Oliver Twins; Big Red Software
- Publisher: Codemasters
- Creator: The Oliver Twins
- Platform: List: Amiga; Amiga CD32; Amstrad CPC; Android; Atari ST; Commodore 64; MS-DOS; iOS; NES; Nintendo Switch; Game Gear; Master System; Mega Drive; ZX Spectrum
- Original release: 1987
- First release: Dizzy – The Ultimate Cartoon Adventure; 1987
- Latest release: Wonderful Dizzy; 18 December 2020
- Spin-offs: Dreamworld Pogie

Dizzy is a series of video games, created by the Oliver Twins and published by Codemasters. It was one of the most successful British video game franchises of the late 1980s and early 1990s. Originally developed on the Amstrad CPC and quickly ported to the ZX Spectrum, the series also appeared on multiple home computer and video game console formats, with over a dozen games being published between 1987 and 1992.

The series is named for its main character, an anthropomorphic egg, called Dizzy for the way he somersaults and rolls around the landscape. The games are set in various fairytale-like locations and typically involve Dizzy trying to save his friends and family, the Yolkfolk, often from the schemes of his nemesis, the evil wizard Zaks.

Most of the games in the series were platform-adventure games, with an emphasis on puzzle solving, collecting objects and interacting with other characters. In addition to these core adventure games, the Dizzy branding and character also appeared in several action games with unrelated gameplay.

Since the demise of the series in the early 1990s, there have been numerous attempts to revive the series. These have included a remake for smartphone platforms, a Kickstarter campaign, and the publishing of several old games that were thought lost. The series has also served as the inspiration for other games, including many fangames.

== Common elements ==
=== Gameplay ===
The first screen of Treasure Island Dizzy (ZX Spectrum version) establishes the setting for the game and also immediately introduces coins, a newly added feature.

The games of the Dizzy series are commonly categorised into either two or three groups. Core to the series and comprising over half its titles are the adventure games, all of which have similar gameplay and mechanics. The rest of the games in the series all have different gameplay from the adventure games and from one another, and are connected only by branding, themes and character. These are commonly referred to as the arcade games, but are sometimes further split into arcade and puzzle games.

The adventure games also included many elements of platform games, such as running and jumping to avoid enemies and hazards. They also relied heavily on object and inventory based puzzles to interact with the environment and non-player characters. For example, the opening screen of Dizzy: Prince of the Yolkfolk tasked the player with escaping from a locked cell using a jug of water, a pile of leaves, and a box of matches.

Additional innovations were added as the series progressed. The ability to carry more than one item simultaneously was added in Treasure Island Dizzy and refined in Fantasy World Dizzy. Collectable items were also first introduced in Treasure Island Dizzy in the form of coins; later games retained the idea but often used other items such as diamonds or cherries. A health bar was first introduced in Magicland Dizzy, allowing Dizzy to be hit without dying.

=== Characters ===
The main protagonist and player character for the series is the eponymous Dizzy, an anthropomorphic egg with big eyes, a smiley face, boxing gloves and minimal identifying features. Named for the way he somersaults and rolls around the screen, Dizzy's design was kept deliberately simple. The idea was that this allows players to project themselves onto the character, and to imagine a character beyond what could be achieved by computer graphics of the time.

Throughout most of the series, Dizzy is joined by a cast of recurring characters, also eggs, known as the Yolkfolk, who make up his friends and family. Not present in the original Dizzy – The Ultimate Cartoon Adventure, the Yolkfolk are first mentioned in Treasure Island Dizzy and then appear on-screen in Fantasy World Dizzy. Including Dizzy, there are seven Yolkfolk in total: Dizzy, Daisy, Denzil, Dora, Dozy, Dylan, and Grand Dizzy. Introduced to allow for more story threads and more interesting characters, the Oliver Twins based each of them on a different character from popular culture. For example, Dora was modelled on Velma from Scooby-Doo and Denzil on Fonzie from Happy Days.

Except for Dizzy himself, the most prominent member of the Yolkfolk is his girlfriend, Daisy. She is often a damsel in distress, with her rescue being the key motivator to the plot of several of the games. Indeed, when Codemasters issued Dizzy collectable cards, Daisy's card acknowledged this: "The only problem with Daisy is that she's always getting captured". However, she eventually appears as a second playable character in Wonderland Dizzy.

Other than the Yolkfolk, prominent recurring characters are the evil wizard Zaks, who was the primary antagonist in several games of the series; and Dizzy's pet, Pogie, a small furry creature known as a Fluffle, who starred in Dizzy, Prince of the Yolkfolk, Spellbound Dizzy, and the spin-off game Dreamworld Pogie.

=== Setting ===
The Dizzy games all take place in fantasy settings loosely based around fables and fairy tales. By alluding to other well known stories, the games are able to present scenarios and puzzles that are interesting and appealing, while also accessible even to a young audience. For instance, a puzzle in which the player must use magic beans to grow a giant beanstalk relies upon the player's pre-existing knowledge of the story of Jack and the Beanstalk. Similarly, the games' simple black-and-white morality, with many of them having the final goal of defeating the evil wizard Zaks, was also a nod to their fairy tales roots. Speaking on the subject, Andrew Oliver said that "it's common in any fairy tale to have an evil person to defeat, and so we went down this route".

== Development ==
=== Creation ===
Dizzy was created in 1987 by Andrew and Philip Oliver, collectively known as the Oliver Twins and published by Codemasters. Prior to Dizzy, the Codemasters had mostly published simulation games such as BMX Simulator and the Oliver Twins own game, Grand Prix Simulator, and they were eager to branch out into different types of games. The character of Dizzy was created before any of his games; the Olivers had noticed that most traditional characters in video games of the time had very small faces which were largely unable to express emotion. As such, they decided to create a new character who was little more than just a large face, rounded out with gloves and boots. They had also ported a development tool -- Panda Sprites to the Amstrad CPC from the BBC Micro original (called Sprites Plus) -- which could be used to easily rotate images on the screen, and they were eager to put it to use. Trying it out on their new character made him somersault and roll around the screen, which they believed gave him a unique feel and also gave rise to his name, Dizzy.

For the game itself, the Olivers aimed to create something with more story and characters than many contemporary games of the time. Their goal was a game that was more akin to an interactive cartoon, hence the game's subtitle, Dizzy: The Ultimate Cartoon Adventure. It was initially released for Amstrad CPC and ZX Spectrum since the two platforms' similar hardware (both use the Z80 microprocessor) made it easier to develop on the CPC and quickly port the code to the Spectrum. A port to the Commodore 64 followed.

At first, Codemasters' David Darling was not impressed by Dizzy, and wanted the Olivers to continue to create more Simulator games instead. However they mostly paid game developers only in royalties at that point, so they published it anyway since it constituted such a low risk for them. Initial sales were unremarkable, being similar to an average Codemasters game of the time; unusually, they remained steady for a prolonged period rather than suffering drop off over time. This was enough for both Codemasters and the Olivers to want to produce a sequel.

=== Growth of the series ===
Treasure Island Dizzy was again written for the ZX Spectrum and Amstrad CPC, using an updated version of the game engine from the original Dizzy, and a world editor that the Olivers had also written. Originally, it was just going to be called Dizzy 2, but they eventually took motivation from the naming of the James Bond series and decided to name it Treasure Island Dizzy, aiming to make it clearer that the game was a separate, stand-alone experience that could be enjoyed without having played the original.

One of the problems that they encountered during development was that it was possible to put the game into an unwinnable state. When the player lost a life, they respawned – effectively being brought back to life – in a safe location. One of the game's items was a snorkel that was required to move underwater and the twins found that it was possible to respawn in such a way that the snorkel was completely inaccessible, either under or across the water. Being unable to think of any other solution in time for release, they made the decision to give the player only one life. This removed the logic problem but also gave the game a reputation as the series' most difficult incarnation.

In addition to the three platforms that Dizzy had appeared on, Treasure Island Dizzy was also ported to the Amiga, Atari ST, Nintendo Entertainment System, and MS-DOS.

The third game in the series, 1989's Fast Food, saw a departure from the style of the first two games. Instead of the platform adventure gameplay they had, it was a maze video game, inspired by Pac-Man. The Olivers have given various explanations for this change in interviews they have given over the years, including a desire to prove that the character of Dizzy was valuable even outside the adventure format, caution over not wanting to over-saturate the market with similar games, and even a desire to develop a game that could be made very quickly to be out in time for Christmas. Regardless of the reason for the change in format, it proved to be a successful one, with Philip Oliver later commenting that "people get more involved in the adventures but the arcade games sell just as well".

The next game, Fantasy World Dizzy, was a return to the adventure game format. It also saw the introduction of the Yolkfolk characters, who were prominent throughout the rest of the series. The extra characters allowed the Olivers to include more dialogue in the game, moving it further towards their original conception of an interactive cartoon. Kwik Snax, another maze game (though this time with a much greater emphasis on puzzle solving). was released in 1990.

=== Handing off to Big Red Software ===
Kwik Snax was the last Dizzy game for the original Amstrad and Spectrum formats the Oliver Twins developed. By this point, it was clear that these formats were not going to survive for much longer and both Codemasters and the Olivers wanted to expand Dizzy into the video game console market. Not only could this allow them to reach a larger audience in the UK and Europe, but it could also allow them to break into lucrative foreign markets, such as the US. Even so, demand for Dizzy games on the original formats was still strong at the time, and it was Codemasters' biggest series. Spread too thin to work on new home computer titles themselves, the Olivers decided to contract out future development to Big Red Software.

Speaking after the fact, the twins commented that they had previously contracted out development of ports of their games to other system, and that this felt like the natural next step for them. For the first game that Big Red developed, Magicland Dizzy, the Olivers still played a major role in the creation, collaborating on the game's story and overseeing the game's design. The next game, Panic Dizzy, was similar; for this falling block puzzle game, the Olivers came up with a design for the game which they sent to Big Red to create.

Big Red Software created two further Dizzy adventure games, Spellbound Dizzy and Dizzy: Prince of the Yolkfolk, both released in 1991. By this time, they were working almost entirely independently, creating games that fit the pre-established formula with minimal oversight or input from the Olivers.

In 1992, Codemasters published Crystal Kingdom Dizzy as a full price game (approximately £10) when all previous games in the series had been budget releases (approximately £3-4). Crystal Kingdom Dizzy reached number one in the ZX Spectrum games chart, and ended up being the last Dizzy game.

=== Console woes ===
The first title to be specifically designed for the NES, Fantastic Dizzy (also known as The Fantastic Adventures of Dizzy) followed the general formula of the adventure games, but also included arcade game sections as mini-games. Two of these mini-games were ported to home computer formats by Big Red as standalone games, becoming Bubble Dizzy and Dizzy Down the Rapids.

Working on the new system also proved to be something of a challenge for the Olivers, who were unused to the longer development cycles and higher degree of polish required for console games, where they had to compete against titles such as Super Mario. The game was completed in 1990, but its release was hampered by the conflict and legal case then ongoing between Codemasters and Nintendo over the Game Genie. It was released in April 1991, but it had missed the important Christmas release window, and lacked a license from Nintendo. Despite a generally favourable reception, the game sold only a quarter of its predicted half million copies.

Further development for consoles was disrupted by disagreements between Codemasters and the Olivers. Dreamworld Pogie, a spin-off starring Dizzy's pet, Pogie, was going to be a scrolling platform inspired by Super Mario, but was cancelled. There were other games that the Olivers had been designing as stand-alone releases which Codemasters only wanted to release as a compilation, The Excellent Dizzy Collection. Even then, one of the slated games, Wonderland Dizzy (a remake of Magicland Dizzy with an Alice in Wonderland theme), was removed from the compilation since Codemasters saw it as being too similar to Dizzy the Adventurer (a remake of Dizzy: Prince of the Yolkfolk). The Excellent Dizzy Collection was eventually released for the Sega Game Gear, and included three games: Dizzy the Adventurer; a previously unreleased puzzle game, Go! Dizzy Go!; and Panic Dizzy, a renamed and updated version of Dizzy Panic.

With these strained relations, the Oliver Twins eventually fell out with Codemasters, and stopped working with or for the company. Since intellectual property rights for the series were split between the two parties, with the Olivers owning the copyright and Codemasters the trademark, this effectively put an end to the series.

== Reception ==
The Dizzy series achieved both critical and commercial success, and was one of the largest and most popular British video game franchises of the late 80s and early 90s with most of the games reaching number one in the charts. Speaking in 1992, Andrew Oliver stated that the Dizzy series received more fan-mail than all other Codemasters games combined. In addition to its success in its home market, the Dizzy games were also extremely popular in Russia and Eastern Europe.

The series was sufficiently popular that various merchandise was made for it, such as clothing, mugs and clocks, even though this was unusual for video games at the time. There were also discussions with Hanna-Barbera about the possibility of creating a cartoon series based on the franchise, though these ultimately never came to fruition due to concerns that the series did not have enough of a global appeal.

However, reception was not universally positive, with some of the arcade games in particular receiving poor reviews. For example, Adam Peters of Amstrad Action referred to Dizzy Panic as "a terrible game" and gave it a score of 12%. In a 2012 retrospective on the series, Richard Cobbett of PC Gamer described the quality of the games as ranging from "bad to mediyolkre [sic]", though also acknowledged that this was less important given the lower prices and generally lower standards of games at the time.

== Appearances on cover tapes and disks ==
Dizzy games made numerous appearances on cover tapes and disks of British magazines, usually in the form of cut-down versions or demos. Indeed, the appearance of a version of the original Dizzy on an Amstrad Action cover tape has been credited with popularising the idea of covermounts in the UK. Sometimes, modified or themed versions of the games were used, such as Dizzy's Easter Eggstravaganza, an Easter-themed version of Fast Food that appeared on a 1993 Amiga Action cover disk.

A Crash magazine cover tape from 1991 included Dizzy 3 and a Half: Into Magicland. This was a short game, comprising only five screens, that served as a prequel for Magicland Dizzy, and was not commercially released or made available anywhere else. Crash also published a special edition of Treasure Island Dizzy.

== Remakes and revival attempts ==
The Oliver Twins and Codemasters, who both own 50% of the intellectual property, have expressed interest in resurrecting the series. However, the twins concede:

... if he were ever to make another appearance it would have to be something special ... he would have to compete with the likes of Jak and Daxter and Ratchet & Clank – and those types of games require big budgets and many months of development. If there's a publisher willing to commit to that kind of investment, though, then they can definitely count us in.

— Andrew Oliver, in a 2005 interview with GamesTM magazine

In October 2011, the website EggCitingNews.com was registered by Codemasters Software Ltd. The main page on the site featured a pair of eyes peering from an egg carton, accompanied by the phrase "Guess who's back?". The following month, the website DizzyGame.com was opened, featuring details of the new release: a port to mobile platforms of Dizzy: Prince of the Yolkfolk. The game was developed by Paul Ranson, who worked on the original 1991 title, with updated music by Codemasters' sound designer Mark Knight, and updated art by Leigh Christian, who had also worked on the original game. Updates that were made to modernise the game included the addition of achievements and a hint system, and the removal of lives. It was released on 9 December of the same year for iOS and Android.

Oliver Twins launched a Kickstarter project titled Dizzy Returns in November 2012; the game was to be the first official sequel in over 20 years. The Oliver Twins asked Dizzy fans to help pledge £350,000 to the Kickstarter campaign in order for the game to be made. By the Kickstarter project's deadline on 21 December, only £25,620 was pledged to the campaign. The Oliver Twins announced on the same day that Dizzy Returns was no longer in development. They attributed the failure to starting the campaign very early in pre-development and therefore not having anything concrete to show to potential backers and stated that while they were still interested in revisiting Dizzy in the future, any such project would have to have a "considerably different" vision.

In the 2010s, the Oliver Twins found the code for several lost NES games that were written during the 1990s but never published; the brothers subsequently released the games. Wonderland Dizzy, a remake of Magicland Dizzy, was released on 24 October 2015. Mystery World Dizzy, a remake of Fantasy World Dizzy, was released on 8 April 2017. Dreamworld Pogie, a previously unreleased spin-off, was discovered in 2011 and released in 2016.

A new game for the series, Wonderful Dizzy, in development by the Oliver Twins and based on The Wonderful Wizard of Oz, was due to be released for the Spectrum Next in late 2018, but was finished in late 2020 as a regular ZX Spectrum title. A few days before the game's release date, the Oliver Twins stated on their website that it would be released on 18 December.

In November 2020, a completely new version of Fast Food (now titled Fast Food Dizzy) was released for the Nintendo Switch. It was developed and published by the Oliver Twins on the FUZE program for the console.

== Game releases ==
Individual games of the Dizzy series
Name	Release date	Type	Formats	Notes	Refs
Dizzy	1987	Adventure	CPC, Spec, C64	Subtitled The Ultimate Cartoon Adventure.	
Treasure Island Dizzy	1988	Adventure	CPC, Spec, C64, Amiga, ST, NES	Also known as Dizzy II.	
Fast Food	1989	Arcade	CPC, Spec, C64, Amiga, ST, DOS, Nintendo Switch	Also known as Fast Food Dizzy, which is also the title of the Nintendo Switch version.	
Fantasy World Dizzy	1989	Adventure	CPC, Spec, C64, Amiga, ST, DOS	Also known as Dizzy III, remade for NES as Mystery World Dizzy.	
Kwik Snax	1990	Puzzle	CPC, Spec, C64, Amiga, ST, DOS	Sometimes considered a sequel to Fast Food.	
Dizzy 3 and a Half: Into Magicland	1991	Adventure	Spec	While still an official game, it was released for free in Crash magazine. Serves as an intro to Magicland Dizzy. With only 5 screens, it's the smallest game in the series.	
Magicland Dizzy	1990	Adventure	CPC, Spec, C64, Amiga, ST, DOS	Also known as Dizzy IV, remade for NES as Wonderland Dizzy.	
Dizzy Panic	1990	Puzzle	CPC, Spec, C64, Amiga, ST, GG, NES	Also known as Panic Dizzy.	
Bubble Dizzy	1990	Arcade	CPC, Spec, C64, Amiga, ST, DOS		
Spellbound Dizzy	1991	Adventure	CPC, Spec, C64, Amiga, ST, DOS	Also known as Dizzy V.	
Dizzy: Prince of the Yolkfolk	1991	Adventure	CPC, Spec, C64, Amiga, ST, DOS	Remade for consoles as Dizzy the Adventurer, later remade for mobile phones. Also known as Dizzy VI.	
Dizzy Down the Rapids	1991	Arcade	CPC, Spec, C64		
Fantastic Dizzy	1991	Adventure	Amiga, DOS, NES, MS, MD, GG	Also known as The Fantastic Adventures of Dizzy.	
Crystal Kingdom Dizzy	1992	Adventure	CPC, Spec, C64, Amiga, ST, DOS	Also known as Dizzy VII.	
Go! Dizzy Go!	1992	Puzzle	GG, NES	Never released as a stand-alone title, only as part of compilations The Excellent Dizzy Collection and Quattro Arcade. It very similar to Kwik Snax, but with two players.	
Dizzy the Adventurer	1992	Adventure	GG, NES	Console remake of Dizzy: Prince of the Yolkfolk.	
Dizzy: Prince of the Yolkfolk (mobile remake)	2011	Adventure	iOS, Android	Remake of the home computer game of the same name.	
Wonderland Dizzy	2015	Adventure	NES	Remake of Magicland Dizzy.	
Dreamworld Pogie	2016	Arcade	NES	Spin-off game	
Mystery World Dizzy	2017	Adventure	NES	Remake of Fantasy World Dizzy.	
Wonderful Dizzy	2020	Adventure	Spec	Also known as Dizzy VIII.	
Key for formats: CPC = Amstrad CPC; Spec = ZX Spectrum; C64= Commodore 64; ST = Atari ST; DOS = MS-DOS; NES = Nintendo Entertainment System; MS = Master System; MD = Mega Drive; GG = Game Gear

Game compilations of the Dizzy series
Name	Release date	Included games	Formats	Refs
The Dizzy Collection	1991	Dizzy, Treasure Island Dizzy, Fast Food, Fantasy World Dizzy, Magicland Dizzy	Amstrad CPC, ZX Spectrum, Commodore 64	
The Dizzy Collection	1991	Kwik Snax, Treasure Island Dizzy, Fast Food, Fantasy World Dizzy, Magicland Dizzy	Amiga, Atari ST	
Dizzy's Excellent Adventures	1992	Kwik Snax, Dizzy Panic, Dizzy Down The Rapids, Dizzy: Prince of the Yolkfolk, Spellbound Dizzy	Amstrad CPC, ZX Spectrum, Commodore 64	
Dizzy's Excellent Adventures	1992	Kwik Snax, Dizzy Panic, Bubble Dizzy, Dizzy: Prince of the Yolkfolk, Spellbound Dizzy	Amiga, Atari ST	
The Excellent Dizzy Collection	1992	Go! Dizzy Go!, Dizzy the Adventurer, Panic Dizzy	Game Gear	
The Big 6	1994	Dizzy: Prince of the Yolkfolk, Crystal Kingdom Dizzy, Fantastic Dizzy, Treasure Island Dizzy, Spellbound Dizzy, Magicland Dizzy	Amiga CD32	

== Cancelled games ==
Name	Expected release date	Type	Formats	Notes	Refs
Learn with Dizzy	1992	Educational	Amiga, Atari ST, PC	Educational Dizzy game by Codemasters.	
Untitled Dizzy game	Mid-2000s	Adventure	PS2	Blitz Games pitched a 3D concept to Codemasters including a trailer.	
Dizzy Returns	2013	Adventure	PC, PS3, Xbox 360, Wii U	Crowdfunding was set up through Kickstarter in late 2012.	

== Fan-created games ==
In addition to the official Dizzy games, many fangames have also been created. Many of these were created with DizzyAGE (Dizzy Adventure Game Engine), a specialised game engine released in 2006 that enables fans to easily create their own games in the style of the original games. Fans had previously had to use other game engines, which were not always suited to the puzzle style of the Dizzy games. From 2006 to 2016, the makers of DizzyAGE ran a competition each year to find the best game from the previous year, with several of the competitions featuring prizes offered by the Oliver Twins. As of 2018, there are over a hundred fan games listed on the DizzyAGE website.

== Related games ==
The Seymour series is a similar franchise, also developed by Big Red and published by Codemasters. The first game in the series, Seymour Goes to Hollywood, was originally conceived as a Dizzy game, but was rebranded due to a desire to keep Dizzy retained to fantasy settings.

Wibble World Giddy is a 1993 public domain parody game for the Amiga. It features similar gameplay to the Dizzy series and stars Giddy, an egg very much like Dizzy except that rather than wear boxing gloves he simply had very large hands. A sequel, Giddy 2, was released the following year, also on Amiga, with a third game, Giddy 3, being made in 2000 for DOS, then subsequently ported to multiple other formats.

Clover: A Curious Tale is a 2009 adventure game that has similar mechanics to and is considered an homage to the Dizzy series. The PC version was published by Blitz 1UP, part of the Oliver Twins' Blitz Games Studios.
