= Steg (video game) =

1992 video game

- Developer: Big Red Software
- Publisher: Codemasters
- Platforms: Amiga, Amstrad CPC, Atari ST, Commodore 64, MS-DOS, ZX Spectrum
- Release: 1992
- Genre: Puzzle-platform

Steg, also known as Steg the Slug, is a puzzle-platform game developed by Big Red Software and published by Codemasters in 1992. It was released for Amiga, Amstrad CPC, Atari ST, Commodore 64, MS-DOS, and ZX Spectrum. Players control the titular slug who must traverse caverns in order to capture maggots in bubbles, then guide them to his starving young who wait in a nest.

== Gameplay ==
Players control the slug protagonist and are tasked with feeding their young, referred to as "T'yungunz" (the young 'uns). Steg can jump and adhere to and move along walls and ceilings to visit the nest and locate maggots.

Steg's offspring occupy a nest at the top of a cavern, and must be fed with maggots. If the slugs are not fed in time, they die and are replaced by tombstones. Once all the young slugs are fed, Steg proceeds to the next cavern where another nest of young wait to be fed. Maggots roam the game's caverns and must be captured in the bubbles which Steg can blow in order to transport them. In order to blow bubbles the player must press and hold the fire button, which fills a meter. Once the meter is full, Steg blows a bubble when the fire button is released. Above the bubble blowing meter on the game screen is an energy bar which drains once the bubble meter is filled. Steg must hold his breath until the maggot is close enough to capture. Once encapsulated, the maggot can be blown to the nest by Steg, which involves avoiding hazards which can burst the bubble or harm Steg. Other objects such as trampolines can aid the player in jumping higher. Steg is invulnerable to damage but can suffocate if his breath is held for too long.

Power-ups include a set of robotic legs, a jet pack and boosts to Steg's speed and energy bar.

== Reception ==
Reception

Awards
Publication	Award
Sinclair User	SU Classic
Your Sinclair	Megagame
