= No Fear Downhill Mountain Biking =

1999 video game

- Developers: Unique Development Studios; Spellbound (GBC)
- Publishers: Codemasters; THQ (GBC)
- Platforms: PlayStation, Game Boy Color
- Release: PlayStation; NA: 18 November 1999; EU: 1999; Game Boy Color; EU: 2 November 2001
- Genre: Sports
- Modes: Single-player, Multiplayer

No Fear Downhill Mountain Biking (also known as No Fear Downhill Mountain Bike Racing) is a mountain bike video game released in 1999 for PlayStation and 2001 for Game Boy Color. The Dreamcast and Microsoft Windows versions were planned but never released.

== Gameplay ==
An extreme sports game, the mountain bike consists of mountain tracks from circuits around the world of varying difficulty. The game was inspired by tracks including San Francisco's Telegraph Hill and New Zealand's Matukituki Rapids.

The game has eight different riders and a number of tracks for the bikes to descend.

== Reception ==
Reception

Aggregate score
| Aggregator | Score |
|---|---|
| GameRankings | 66% |

Review scores
| Publication | Score |
|---|---|
| AllGame | 3/5 |
| CNET Gamecenter | 7/10 |
| Consoles + | 75% |
| Electronic Gaming Monthly | 4/10 |
| Game Informer | 4.25/10 |
| GameSpot | 5/10 |
| IGN | 5.5/10 |
| Next Generation | 2/5 |
| PlayStation Official Magazine – UK | 6/10 |
| Official U.S. PlayStation Magazine | 2.5/5 |
| The Sydney Morning Herald | 4/5 |

The PlayStation version received "average" reviews according to the review aggregation website GameRankings. Tom Russo of NextGen said, "This downhill mountain-bike racer is quirky fun, but the limitations are enough to keep it at two stars." GamePro said of the game, "For some, No Fear will be a passion; for most, it will be a rental. It's too flawed to be a hit, but it's too good to be ignored." (Note: GamePro gave the PlayStation version 3.5/5 for graphics, and three 4/5 scores for sound, control, and fun factor.)
