= Dizzy Panic =

1991 video game

Dizzy Panic!
- Developer: Big Red Software
- Publisher: Codemasters
- Designer: Oliver Twins
- Composer: Allister Brimble (C64)
- Series: Dizzy
- Platforms: Amstrad CPC, ZX Spectrum, Commodore 64, Master System, Game Gear
- Release: 14 May 1991
- Genre: Puzzle
- Mode: Single-player

Dizzy Panic is a puzzle video game published in 1991 by Codemasters for the Amstrad CPC, ZX Spectrum, Commodore 64, Master System, and Game Gear. The game is based on the Dizzy series and was designed by the Oliver Twins but was developed by Big Red Software.

Gameplay involves moving a wall left and right so that falling shapes pass through the appropriately shaped holes in the wall.

The game is included in the 1993 The Excellent Dizzy Collection as Panic Dizzy. This title was also used (mistakenly) on cassettes in the original game in the Dizzy's Excellent Adventures Collection.

== Reviews ==
Retro Gamer called Dizzy Panic "A very difficult, frustrating yet enjoyable game" requiring maximum hand-eye coordination skills.
