= Crystal Kingdom Dizzy =

1992 video game

- Developer: Codemasters
- Publisher: Codemasters
- Designer: Oliver Twins
- Series: Dizzy
- Platforms: Amstrad CPC, ZX Spectrum, Commodore 64, Amiga, Atari ST, CD32
- Release: December 1992
- Genres: Adventure, platform
- Mode: Single-player

Crystal Kingdom Dizzy is an adventure video game featuring the character Dizzy released in December 1992 by Codemasters. The Oliver Twins – who were heavily involved in the design and programming of previous Dizzy games – had less involvement with this one.

The game was the last title in the core Dizzy series until the release of Wonderful Dizzy in 2020.

At £9.99, this was the first full-price Dizzy game released for home computers; previous games had been released at budget prices (£2-3). This elicited some criticism, as despite the much higher tag, the game was no bigger or more complex than its much lower-priced predecessors.

The Spectrum version of the game knocked Rainbow Islands from the top of the UK Spectrum sales chart, and prevented Street Fighter II from being number one. This version was voted number 70 in the Your Sinclair Readers Top 100 Games of All Time.

The Commodore 64 and Amstrad CPC versions were the only core games in the series to be entirely coded for those platforms as opposed to porting over the graphic designs from the Spectrum versions as previously.
