= Fantastic Dizzy =

1991 video game

- Developer: Codemasters
- Publishers: Camerica (NES); Codemasters (other versions)
- Designer: The Oliver Twins
- Composer: Matt Gray (NES)
- Series: Dizzy
- Platforms: NES, MS-DOS, Master System, Mega Drive, Game Gear, Amiga, CD32
- Release: April 1991
- Genres: Adventure, platform
- Mode: Single-player

Fantastic Dizzy (The Fantastic Adventures of Dizzy on NES) is a 1991 video game developed by Codemasters. It is part of the Dizzy series. It was published on several platforms, including Mega Drive/Genesis, Master System, Game Gear, Nintendo Entertainment System, Amiga, and MS-DOS.

The game was planned to be released in time for Christmas in 1990. However, because of a legal action between Codemasters and Nintendo over the Game Genie the title was released in April 1991; as a result, the game missed the Christmas rush it was originally slated for. It sold 125,000 units instead of the expected 500,000. The game was awarded the "NES Adventure Game of the Year 1991" by Game Players Magazine and given the Parents Choice Award. Almost all of puzzles are from the previous games. The game is one of the seven games released for the Aladdin Deck Enhancer.

== Plot ==
The evil wizard Zaks casts a spell on the Yolkfolk and kidnaps Dizzy's girlfriend Daisy. It is up to Dizzy to undo Zaks' doings and rescue Daisy from the castle in the clouds.

=== Characters ===
Fantastic Dizzy contains all 16 characters in the series. While most of the Yolkfolk were harmed by Zaks, others have different problems. Other characters include Good Wizard Theodore, Blackheart the Pirate, the Palace Guard, Prince Clumsy, Rockwart the Troll, Shamus the Leprechaun and the Shop Owner.

=== Locations ===
There are several places for Dizzy to visit, including the whole complex of the Yolkfolk secret treehouse, the mine, the neighbouring city of Keldor, a pirate ship, a castle, the grasslands, Carber Bay, the cemetery and finally Zaks' Cloud Castle.

The game generally scrolls horizontally, although some mini-games/sections scroll vertically. When Dizzy climbs a ladder or jumps to an off-screen platform, a new screen is loaded. As game play continues, the scenery cycles between night and day.

== Gameplay ==
The game is hard to qualify in a genre: while it seems at first a platform game, Dizzy is vulnerable to all enemies while unable to eliminate them, and puzzles are completed by bringing an object to a location (in the same fashion as Gods and adventure games). Dizzy also has to capture all 250 stars scattered in the game. The game can also be seen as a union of all the previous games where the player can find a lot of familiar puzzles (e.g. elevators, magic beans) and places (e.g. mines, deep sea) as well as several arcade minigames based on older games in the series (like Bubble Dizzy).

=== Stars ===
Depending on the version of the game, 100 or 250 stars are scattered around the game which must be collected to grant access to the final confrontation with Zaks. While most stars are accessible in the regular parts of the game, some are placed inside the minigames, which forces the player to run through them as many times needed to get all stars. If the player tries to reach the tower without the stars, Dizzy is stunned by the electric door.

=== Objects ===
Dizzy can carry up to three items like keys and objects to be used to solve puzzles. Some objects are meant to be traded to characters, given to characters, or placed in certain locations. Some are used to reach places or things otherwise inaccessible or to protect from danger. This element is similar to the game Puggsy, released for Sega systems.

=== Minigames ===
While most of the game is passed in the slower platform sections, there are three minigames required to complete it, plus one to get all the stars:

- Mine carts: Dizzy can travel in the carts found in the mine into other places in the game, collecting stars along the way. There are a number of dangers in the rails, from falling rocks (explosions on NES, Master System and Game Gear versions), dead ends and carts in the opposite direction. Nearing the end, both cart speed and number of dead ends increase.
- Dizzy Down the Rapids: 8-bit versions of Fantastic Dizzy feature a section where Dizzy must ride a barrel down a river avoiding a pursuing troll and several natural hazards while riding surface currents and attempting to collect stars. This minigame is omitted from 16-bit and Amiga CD32 versions.
- Castle Capers: A minigame based on the Operation Wolf concept, Dizzy, armed with a crossbow, has to get a 5-hit advantage over the trolls, who are occupying the castle. If the trolls get the same advantage, Dizzy loses a life.
- Bubble Trouble: Dizzy has to reach a small island before his oxygen wears out. To do so, he has to ride air bubbles formed in the sea bed, and jumping into the platforms in the sides or other bubbles before they burst. Larger bubbles endure more, but are slower, while smaller ones are fast but burst shortly after Dizzy rides them. This minigame was adapted into a standalone title, called Bubble Dizzy but due to further development required on Fantastic Dizzy and Dizzy Down the Rapids, Bubble Dizzy was released in November 1990.
- Theodore's magic puzzle: The extra life minigame is a regular 4x4 shuffling puzzle, which has to be completed in inside a time limit. As the number of lives increase, so does the complexity of the puzzles.

=== Damage indicator ===
The game uses a damage indicator, as a reverse version of health. When the meter fills up, Dizzy loses a life.

== Reception ==
Reception

Review scores
Publication	Score
Amiga Computing	80%
Amiga Force	86%
Amiga Format	87% 80% (budget)
Amiga Power	80%
Amiga User International	69%
Computer and Video Games	PC: 78% SMD: 80/100
Electronic Gaming Monthly	NES: 20/40; SMD: 34/50
Joypad	84%
Mean Machines Sega	59/100
Mega Fun	SGG & SMS: 66% SMD: 67%
PC Zone	50/100
Video Games (DE)	NES: 65% SMD & SMS: 69%
Entertainment Weekly	NES: A−
Mega	80%
N-Force	90% 92% (PAL)
The One	84%
Sega Master Force	SMS: 87/100
Sega Pro	SGG & SMS: 92% SMD: 90%

Entertainment Weekly gave the game an A− and wrote: "Too-cute-for-words Dizzy (an anthropomorphized egg) needs your help to traverse his puzzle-filled kingdom. This game makes you expend IQ points, and the music is funky". In 2017, Gamesradar ranked the game 30th on their "Best Sega Genesis/Mega Drive games of all time" list.
