= Dragon Empires =

- Developer(s): Codemasters
- Publisher(s): Codemasters
- Platform(s): Microsoft Windows
- Release: Cancelled
- Genre(s): MMORPG
- Mode(s): Multiplayer

Dragon Empires screenshot

Dragon Empires was a fantasy massively multiplayer online role-playing game developed by UK-based Codemasters. Its main focus was player versus player clan action to take control of 50 cities in five empires within its world.

== Development ==
On September 20, 2001, Codemasters unveiled development of Dragon Empires; it was initially slated for launch in October 2002. The game received enthusiastic response from gamers, with 120,000 signing up to beta-test the game. Reviewers also appreciated the game for its graphics and gameplay. One reviewer said:

Boasting amazing graphics with a deep player-influenced world that promises to become more addictive as content is added, Dragon Empires looks promising. … if the words "amazing graphics" and "incredible game" were synonymous, Dragon Empires would be one of the greatest games to hit the MMORPG scene thus far.

At the 2003 Electronic Entertainment Expo in Los Angeles, Codemasters demonstrated a prototype of the game engine and awed critics with breathtaking renderings of the game environment. As development progressed, the release date was pushed back multiple times, to October 2003 and then to spring 2004.

== Cancellation ==
Codemasters revealed in September 3, 2004 that they had ceased game development citing technical issues. Three days later, Dragon Empires producer Gary Dunn explained that their server code was incapable of supporting the number of clients expected for a massively multiplayer game. This prompted a six-week review of the game's viability, which found that the cost to fix the difficulties would be high and the decision was made to cancel the title.

Despite the cancellation of several MMOs in 2004, Ed Relf, marketing brand manager at Codemasters maintained that the tightly packed MMORPG market was not a reason for the discontinuation. The Dragon Empires community started a petition hoping to renew development in the game. However, the game's official website was closed some time after June 17, 2005.
