= SkySaga: Infinite Isles =

- Developer(s): Radiant Worlds
- Publisher(s): Smilegate

SkySaga: Infinite Isles was a free-to-play sandbox massively multiplayer online role-playing game for Microsoft Windows developed by Radiant Worlds and published by Korean online game publisher Smilegate.

Following an announcement on 22 August 2017, all production has stopped on SkySaga. Production has been put on indefinite suspension by publisher Smilegate. The website was locked from access besides the front page on September 28 with a final statement that the game has been put on hold.

== Gameplay ==
Each player has their own island that will be their home in the world of SkySaga. Players may also purchase extra islands to build on. Players can travel to different realms to complete quests, collect resources, explore and fight enemies through the Megalith on their home island.

After they return from their adventure, they can travel to the City of First Light to trade in and purchase resources, turn in quests and get new quests, join a Build Off, use the Megalith to travel to adventures, join others in completing a dungeon or just meet friends.

Players start the game with a choice of four playable races. Cosmetic alterations such as hair, eyes, and armour colour can also be modified.

=== Game environment ===
The City of Last Light

The City of Last Light is where the notable characters of SkySaga have gathered to trade and give quests. Players will spend a lot of time in this area acquiring quests and purchasing materials to be used for crafting and building. As Adventures are completed more quests unlock, gradually introducing the story of the Infinite Isles to each player.

Home Islands

Each player commences the game on their Home Island. This area is fully customisable. Players may invite friends to aid in their creations by granting build rights on a temporary basis.

Adventure Islands

Players may choose to start an Adventure by trading in keystone fragments (and sometimes other items) whereby they are transported through a Megalith portal to a randomly generated instance. This Adventure will feature quests, resources, enemies, and landmarks which can all be interacted with. Most Adventures also feature a boss which can be defeated to earn high-value loot.

Blueprint Studio

Players have access to a large quantity of resources in all colours to build structures in a "blueprint". This allows other players to purchase and use the structure on their home islands.

== Awards ==
SkySaga: Infinite Isles received the 2015 TIGA Award for Best Audio Design
