= Treasure Island Dizzy =

1989 video game

- Developer: Oliver Twins
- Publisher: Codemasters
- Series: Dizzy
- Platforms: Amstrad CPC, ZX Spectrum, Commodore 64, Amiga, Atari ST, NES, Amiga CD32, Jaguar
- Release: January 1989
- Genres: Adventure, platform
- Mode: Single-player

Treasure Island Dizzy is a 1989 puzzle video game developed by the Oliver Twins and published by Codemasters for the Amstrad CPC and ZX Spectrum, and later ported to the Commodore 64, NES, Amiga, Atari ST and Atari Jaguar. Treasure Island Dizzy is the second game in the Dizzy series, and is the sequel to Dizzy – The Ultimate Cartoon Adventure.

== Design ==
The first screen of the ZX Spectrum version

This game is quite different from its predecessor, with a new inventory system and improved animations. The game contains fewer enemies than the previous title. It is more centred on inventory-based problem solving. The aim of the game is to solve various puzzles in order to obtain a boat so that Dizzy can return to his friends and family, the Yolkfolk. To do this Dizzy must journey through haunted mines and tree villages, as well as underwater. The game also features a subquest (albeit one essential to completing the game) in which thirty gold coins must be collected. Such subquests were found in many of the sequels.

Critics consider this one of the most difficult Dizzy games as the energy bar system of later titles was not yet implemented and Dizzy is provided with only one life—contrasting with five in the first game and three in Fantasy World Dizzy, the immediate sequel, and most subsequent titles. Also unique to this game, the player is unable to select any particular item from the inventory for use—Dizzy simply puts down whichever item is at the top of the list. If Dizzy is underwater and the snorkel happens to be at the top of the inventory list, he will drop the snorkel when the player collects another item and instantly die. Treasure Island Dizzy therefore requires more foresight and planning than the other games in the series.

Adding to the difficulty of the game was that the player had two main tasks to complete; the escape from the islands, and the collection of the thirty coins. Upon escaping the final island, the Shopkeeper character appears and tells Dizzy that he cannot leave without finding all thirty coins. Given that a number of the coins were hidden behind scenery, this second task proved to be more difficult than the main game. Commodore Format printed a "complete" solution and map which, like the Codemasters premium-rate telephone number, did not include the hidden coins, frustrating many players.

== Ports ==
A version for the Nintendo Entertainment System was published by Camerica as part of the video game compilation Quattro Adventure. This version was released for the Evercade handheld game system in October 2020 as part of The Oliver Twins Collection compilation cartridge.

Codemasters released a version of Treasure Island Dizzy for Microsoft Windows on the company's website in December 2004. Available for download after registration, it was in fact the Commodore 64 version bundled with the CCS64 emulator in a single executable. The download is no longer available.

== Reception ==
Treasure Island Dizzy debuted at #10 in the Gallup Budget Top 10 early in 1989, taking the #1 position in the budget chart on a number of occasions over the next few months. It reached #2 in the All Formats chart behind RoboCop..

The game spent over two years in the Gallup All Formats Top 40. The ZX Spectrum version alone sold over 100,000 copies.
