= Fantasy World Dizzy =

1989 video game

- Art recycled for the North American release of Fantastic Dizzy.
- Developer: Oliver Twins
- Publishers: Codemasters; Camerica
- Composer: Allister Brimble (Amiga)
- Series: Dizzy
- Platforms: Amstrad CPC, ZX Spectrum, Commodore 64, Amiga, Atari ST, MS-DOS
- Release: October 1989
- Genre: Action
- Mode: Single-player

Fantasy World Dizzy is a 1989 action video game developed by the Oliver Twins and published by Codemasters. The game is considered the third in the Dizzy series and was developed under the name Dizzy III. The third Dizzy game to be released, Fast Food, was regarded as a spin-off that deviated from the standard Dizzy format.

Fantasy World Dizzy was the first Dizzy adventure to feature many elements which later became standard for the series, such as having three lives, an improved inventory system and a balance between puzzle-solving and hazards. This game also introduced the Yolkfolk: Daisy, Denzil, Dozy, Dylan and Grand-Dizzy.

A Nintendo Entertainment System version titled Mystery World Dizzy was developed in April 1993 but was not released until 24 years later in April 2017. It is available free on the official Dizzy website. A Kickstarter campaign has also been started to produce the game on a physical NES cartridge.

== Plot ==
Dizzy's girlfriend Daisy is kidnapped by the King Troll while walking through a forest with Dizzy, and he has to chase after her. Along the way, Dizzy must collect 30 coins.

== Reception ==
Reception

Award
Publication	Award
Crash	Crash Smash

The game was given a rating of 9 out of 10 by Peter Parrish of Eurogamer. The ZX Spectrum version was voted the 25th best game of all time in a special issue of Your Sinclair magazine in 2004. Amstrad Action rated its version as 89%.

In October 1994, Commodore Format magazine included a full playable version of the game on their covertape.

Fantasy World Dizzy is sarcastically referenced in the Zero Punctuation video game review series as "the best game ever".
