= Dizzy: Prince of the Yolkfolk =

1991 video game

- Amiga cover art
- Developer: Big Red Software
- Publisher: Codemasters
- Composers: Allister Brimble (Amiga, Amstrad CPC, ZX Spectrum, C64)
- Series: Dizzy
- Platforms: Amstrad CPC, ZX Spectrum, C64, Atari ST, Amiga, MS-DOS, NES, CD32, iOS, Android
- Release: December 1991 iOS & Android; 9 December 2011
- Genres: Adventure, platform
- Mode: Single-player

Dizzy: Prince of the Yolkfolk is a 1991 adventure video game developed by Big Red Software and published by Codemasters for the Amstrad CPC, Atari ST, Commodore 64, ZX Spectrum, MS-DOS, NES and Amiga. It was the sixth game in the Dizzy adventure series. Initially it was only released as part of the Dizzy's Excellent Adventures compilation. The creators of the series, the Oliver Twins, outsourced the video game company Big Red Software to design and develop the game. The game interface and mechanics resemble those of Magicland Dizzy, discarding changes introduced in the fifth game.

The game was enhanced and re-released in November 1992 with the Aladdin Deck Enhancer under the title Dizzy the Adventurer. The title was then released in 1993 as part of The Excellent Dizzy Collection. An HD remake of this game was released on the Android and iOS platforms in December 2011.
