= BMX Simulator =

1986 video game

- Developer: Codemasters (Note: Ported to the Amstrad CPC and the ZX Spectrum by Tim Miller and to the Atari XL/XE by Adrian Sheppard)
- Publisher: Codemasters
- Designer: Richard Darling
- Composer: David Whittaker
- Platforms: Amiga, Atari 8-bit, Atari ST, Amstrad CPC, Commodore 64, MSX, ZX Spectrum, Plus/4, Commodore 16.
- Release: 1986
- Genre: Racing
- Modes: Single-player, multiplayer

BMX Simulator is a racing video game designed by Richard Darling and released by Codemasters in 1986 for the Commodore 64. It is part of a series of games that includes ATV Simulator, Grand Prix Simulator, Professional Ski Simulator, and a sequel: Professional BMX Simulator. BMX Simulator was ported to the Amiga, Atari 8-bit computers, Atari ST, Amstrad CPC, MSX, ZX Spectrum, Plus/4, and Commodore 16.

== Gameplay ==
Gameplay screenshot (Atari 8-bit)

BMX Simulator is an overhead race game similar to the arcade video game Super Sprint. The player must race against another player, or the computer, around a series of seven different bicycle motocross (BMX) tracks. There is also a time limit to be beaten. Only two cyclists can compete in each race. The race can be viewed in slow-motion instant replay afterward.

== Reception ==
Reception

Review scores
Publication	Score
Crash	63%
Your Sinclair	7/10

Sinclair User called it "a classy conversion from the Commodore original" and a "full price game in budget clothing".

ZX Computing said it was fun from start to finish, and rated it a Monster Hit.

The game sold 345,423 copies.

== Legacy ==
BMX Simulator was followed by a sequel in 1988, Professional BMX Simulator. It was later rereleased as BMX Simulator 2.
