= Spellbound Dizzy =

1991 video game

- Developer: Big Red Software
- Publisher: Codemasters
- Composers: Allister Brimble (Amiga, C64, Amstrad CPC, ZX Spectrum)
- Series: Dizzy
- Platforms: Amstrad CPC, ZX Spectrum, Commodore 64, Amiga, Atari ST, CD32
- Release: EU: November 11, 1991
- Genres: Adventure, platform
- Mode: Single-player

Spellbound Dizzy or Dizzy 5 is an adventure video game, featuring the character Dizzy, released in November 1991 by Codemasters. The series was originally developed by the Oliver twins; however, they had little involvement with this title other than executive sign-off. This left Big Red Software to redesign the graphics engine and design the game and puzzles.

The game is the fifth in the Dizzy series, excluding arcade spin-offs such as Kwik Snax and had the largest map of any Dizzy game to date with 108 screens. Consequently, it is by far longer and more difficult than any other game in the series. The gameplay is also complicated by the fact that Dizzy loses health when falling from heights (a feature which was removed from subsequent games). This level of difficulty made many players cheat by using patches giving Dizzy unlimited lives.

The game also presents slightly different user interface, graphics and concepts that never occurred earlier or later in the series: an inventory with items icons, separated collection (stars) and healing (apples) items (in other games they are always '2 in 1'), hidden passages and dynamic animated set pieces (the travel tunnels, the mining cart, etc.) There are additional animations and abilities, such as swimming and eating.

The Spectrum version of the game, like all the titles since Dizzy 3, has both 48k and 128k versions packaged. The 128k version features richer graphics and animation, extended dialogue and a background music track.

== Spellbound Dizzy Lite ==
The release of the Commodore 64 version of Dizzy's Excellent Adventures (a compilation featuring five games) comes with a significantly reduced version of the game, with many bugs. The complete version of the game was later released for the computer. The release for other platforms is the same in both releases.

== Reception ==
The ZX Spectrum version was voted number 18 in the Your Sinclair Readers' Top 100 Games of All Time.
