= Captain Dynamo (video game) =

1992 video game

- Developer: Codemasters
- Publisher: Codemasters
- Composer: Allister Brimble (Commodore 64)
- Platforms: Atari ST; Amiga; ZX Spectrum; MS-DOS; Commodore 64
- Release: 1992
- Genre: Platform

Captain Dynamo is a vertically scrolling platform game developed by Codemasters and released in 1992. Captain Dynamo, an aging superhero, is brought out of retirement to recover a haul of stolen diamonds from the trap-infested rocket-ship of the villainous Austen Von Flyswatter. It was published for the Amiga, Atari ST, Commodore 64, ZX Spectrum, Amstrad CPC, and MS-DOS. Versions for Game Gear and Mega Drive were planned but never released.

== Gameplay ==
There are six stages in total. The goal is to collect as many diamonds as possible in each stage and then enter the teleport unit at the top. The task is complicated by various mechanical hazards and creatures.

== Reception ==
Sinclair User magazine gave the game a Gold award.

Reception

Award
Publication	Award
Sinclair User	Gold
