= Micro Machines (video game) =

1991 video game

- European Mega Drive cover art
- Developer: Codemasters: Big Red Software (MS-DOS & GB) Merit Studios (SNES) Paragon 5 (GBA)
- Publishers: Camerica (NES); Codemasters; Ocean Software (SNES & GB)
- Composers: Patrick Phelan; Matt Gray (NES); Lyndon Sharp (GB)
- Series: Micro Machines
- Platforms: NES, Amiga, Game Gear, Master System, Mega Drive/Genesis, MS-DOS, CD-i, SNES, Game Boy
- Release: 1991: NES; WW: 1991 Mega Drive/Genesis; EU: July 1993; NA: September 1993 Amiga; EU: September 1993 Game Gear; NA: March 1994; EU: March 10, 1994 Master System; EU: March 10, 1994 DOS; EU: 1994 CD-i; WW: 1 June 1994 SNES; EU: 1994; NA: December 1994 Game Boy; EU: 1995; NA: January 1995 PlayStation 2, Xbox; EU: 8 November 2002; NA: 19 March 2003 (PS2 only); AU: 2005 (PS2 only) GameCube; EU: 17 January 2003 Game Boy Advance; EU: 21 February 2003
- Genre: Racing
- Modes: Single-player, multiplayer

Micro Machines is a racing game developed by Codemasters and originally published by Camerica for the Nintendo Entertainment System in 1991. Themed around Galoob's Micro Machines toys, players race in miniaturised toy vehicles around various environments. The game is the first installment in the Micro Machines video game series.

Micro Machines was developed because Galoob wanted Codemasters to develop a game based on their toy brand, although Galoob and Codemasters encountered legal issues with Nintendo over the game being unlicensed. Micro Machines was ported to several systems, and received reboots for the Xbox, PlayStation 2, and GameCube in 2002. A sequel, Micro Machines 2: Turbo Tournament, was released in 1994, and the series was revived in 2016 with the release of a title for iOS and Android. Micro Machines received critical acclaim, with reviewers praising the originality and two-player mode, although some criticised the sprites on some versions. Retrospectively, it has been considered one of the greatest video games of all time.

== Gameplay ==
A typical race in progress, Game Boy version

Micro Machines is a top-down racing game: players observe races from above. Players race in environments such as breakfast and pool tables, work desks, and treehouses, driving toy vehicles such as powerboats, helicopters, formula one cars, and tanks that can shoot other racers. Courses have a predefined path that racers must follow: if a player leaves the defined route for too long they are sent back to the track. Many have obstacles such as cereal boxes on breakfast tables, and pencil sharpeners on desks.

There are two game modes: the Micro Machines Challenge, and head-to-head. In both modes, players select a character. In Micro Machines Challenge, players race against three computer-controlled opponents, and must finish in first or second to qualify for the next round. Players are given three chances: if all three are lost the game is over. Every three races, players compete in a time trial race to earn an extra chance. In head-to-head, players race against another vehicle. Players are colour-coded, and the goal is to get lights on the screen to show the player's colour by getting a screen ahead of the other player, so the trailing player is no longer visible. When this happens, one light turns to the colour of the leading player. The game ends when all eight lights are one colour, or after three laps, in which case victory goes to the player with the most lights. If the game is tied, there is a "sudden death play-off", where the next player to win a light wins. The game starts with four lights of each colour. Head-to-head can be played in either single-player mode or with two players. With two players, certain characters have a handicap to give the other player a better chance. The Game Gear version supports two players via link-up, or by players holding one end of the console each with one player using the buttons and the other the D-pad.

== Development ==
In 1990, the founders of Codemasters, David and Richard Darling, were at the Consumer Electronics Show in Las Vegas, and were impressed with the popularity of the Nintendo Entertainment System in the US. They wanted to develop games for the system, but did not have a licence from Nintendo. In October 1989, programmer Andrew Graham developed a prototype, California Buggy Boys, a racing game with a top-down view on a scrolling dune-based race track. Its two player mode, based on the 1983 Adventure International game Rally Speedway, does not employ split screen, a technique that is hard to achieve on NES hardware. Instead, two players race on a single screen, hugging the screen edges as the distance between them grows. Once the distance is large enough, the winning player gains a point – a difference from Rally Speedway, in which the losing player gains a time penalty instead.

The prototype was showcased with multiple consoles networked. It featured buggies similar to those in Power Drift, targeting the United States market. Codemasters then obtained a licensing deal with Galoob, wanting a game based on its Micro Machines toys. California Buggy Boys was used as a base, and Galoob sent a good selection of toys to Codemasters.

The development team did not have access to official Nintendo documents, and their knowledge of the NES's hardware came from reverse engineering. They chose recognisable household environments such as tables, although the NES's limited graphics capabilities necessitates repetition. Artist Paul Perrot converted the California Buggy Boys graphics using Deluxe Paint and a cross compiler. According to Graham, the team tried to keep the tracks short, as they were considered more enjoyable. Graham stated that the artificial intelligence (AI) is basic by modern standards, and that it was difficult to replicate the multiplayer experience in single-player mode. The AI consisted of invisible arrows, which directed computer-controlled vehicles. Graham stated that split screen was not viable on the NES, and that the single-screen system was something that he was eager to try. He further stated that he was "very happy" with the multiplayer mode, saying it is the best part of the game and made the single player mode "boring" in comparison. He was very pleased when Richard Darling stated that Micro Machines is the best game they had ever made. Another multiplayer mode was shown at the Consumer Electronics Show, but was discontinued due to requiring a network.

Micro Machines was completed in September 1990. It was not submitted to quality assurance, so a major bug that caused the game to crash was discovered near completion. The bug occurred when the player tried to reverse on the first race, but none of the testers thought to do so as they thought it was so easy. It was determined that just one binary bit was wrong, but many buggy ROM chips had already been manufactured, so a device akin to a miniature Game Genie was installed in the cartridges to correct it.

== Release ==
Micro Machines was released for the NES by Camerica in 1991. Nintendo wanted development halted because Codemasters did not have a licence from them, and sued Galoob over the sales of the Game Genie. Courts ruled in Galoob's favour, Nintendo appealed, and the ruling was upheld. The legal issues meant that sales of the NES version were not as good as hoped.

After the release of the NES version, ports for the Mega Drive, Game Gear, Master System, Game Boy, Super Nintendo Entertainment System (SNES), CD-i, and IBM PC compatibles were developed. The Mega Drive team changed the handling (giving it an "on-rails" feel), and most of the graphics merely required redrawing. This involved adding colour, or simply recreating them based on the originals. Rotations were added to the vehicle sprites for smoother movement. According to artist Brian Hartley, the main considerations were the colour schemes, and it was decided to keep the game with a cartoon style. He stated it led to a "fun use of colour". The design decisions were made during the development for the NES version, so the Mega Drive team simply had to convert the game for Mega Drive hardware. Galoob's only input was to ensure correctness of their logos. The Mega Drive version was originally due for release in January 1993, but Sega's legal issues over the game's lack of license delayed release until July.

The CD-i version was coded by Ashley Hogg. He stated that there were problems that only occurred on this console, and CD-Rs were expensive. The Game Gear team were originally against the "on-rails" handling of the Mega Drive version, and wanted to revert to the NES drifting. The Game Gear version was created by Ashley Routledge and Dave Saunders, who adjusted the Mega Drive graphics to the Game Gear's smaller screen. It was produced alongside the Mega Drive version, and programmed from scratch to run at 60 frames per second (FPS). The main problem was retaining detail on the Game Gear's inferior storage and memory capabilities. Much of the art had to be redrawn with fewer colours at lower resolutions. The biggest problem was the screen size, which made it difficult to take corners at high speeds. The team tweaked the camera movement so the vehicle was positioned further back, so players are able to see the track ahead according to vehicle speed. The options screens were simplified, to quickly initiate the gameplay.

Graham was at the centre of development across platforms, and had no problem with the Game Gear version having vehicle behaviour similar to the NES version. Routledge and Saunders came up with the method of multiplayer on the same device. Multiplayer via link-up was difficult to implement, with problems such as the game losing sync.

The Game Gear version was released in 1993, the Master System, CD-i, SNES, and MS-DOS versions in 1994, and the Game Boy version in 1995. The Amiga version was released in September 1993. Micro Machines was followed by a sequel, Micro Machines 2: Turbo Tournament in 1994, and a reboot (titled MicroMachines and released by Infogrames) in 2002 for PlayStation 2, Xbox, and Game Boy Advance. A GameCube version was released in January 2003, although this version and the Xbox version were cancelled in the US. The series received an updated game (also titled Micro Machines) for iOS and Android in 2016. Micro Machines was bundled with its sequel and released on the Game Boy Color in 2000.

== Reception ==
Reception

Review scores
| Publication | Score |
|---|---|
| AllGame | 4.5/5 (NES) |
| Amiga Action | 83% (Amiga) |
| Amiga Computing | 80% (Amiga) |
| Amiga Format | 90% (Amiga) |
| Amiga Power | 88% (Amiga) |
| Computer and Video Games | 89% (Mega Drive); 89% (Game Gear) |
| Electronic Gaming Monthly | 8/10, 8/10, 6/10, 8/10 (NES) |
| GamesMaster | 93% (Mega Drive) |
| Joypad | 89% (Game Gear); 88% (Master System) |
| Mean Machines Sega | 94% (Game Gear); 93% (Mega Drive); 93% (Master System) |
| Mega Fun | 79% (Game Gear/Master System); 78% (NES) |
| Player One | 90% (Master System); 90% (Game Gear) |
| Amiga Dream | 75% (Amiga) |
| Amiga Joker | 81% (Amiga) |
| Coming Soon | 85% (PC) |
| CU Amiga | 89% (Amiga) |
| Mean Machines | 93% (NES) |
| Mega | 92% (Mega Drive) |
| The One | 89% (Amiga) |
| Sega Force | 90% (Mega Drive) |
| Sega Master Force | 90% (Game Gear) |
| Supersonic | 86% (Mega Drive) |

Micro Machines received critical acclaim. The multiplayer mode in particular was well received, and some reviewers complimented the graphics and addictiveness. Reviewing the Mega Drive version, Computer and Video Games's Steve Keen lauded the vehicle movement and sound effects, and Paul Rand praised the multiplayer mode. Both described Micro Machines as one of the better racing games on the Mega Drive. In 1994, Micro Machines was listed as their best Mega Drive driving game. The reviewer from Mega magazine eulogised the playability, but criticised the lack of a save function. Nevertheless, he thought the game was "destined to become a classic". In a later review, the game was described as "utterly wonderful", and the addictiveness of the head-to-head mode was praised. The game was listed at number eight of their top 100 list. GamesMaster's Jim Douglas lauded the graphics, "brilliant" controls, and the two-player mode, and James Leach described the Mega Drive version as "even better" than the NES version, and eulogised the addictiveness. A reviewer from Mean Machines Sega agreed with GamesMaster by complimenting the addictiveness of two-player mode, but believed the single-player mode is too easy. Sega Force's reviewer praised the visuals and "colourful" graphics and the two-player mode, but described the sounds as "average". The game was described as having an "undeniable charm" by a reviewer from French magazine Supersonic.

The Game Gear and Master System versions were noted for the ability to link two units together, and the graphics, respectively. Reviewing the Game Gear version, Mean Machines Sega's reviewer believed the method of two players on one console was "revolutionary", but criticised the sprite flicker. Nevertheless, the game was described as "probably the most playable game around". A reviewer from GamePro described the graphics as colourful, but criticised the difficulty of distinguishing vehicles despite the colour-coding. The sounds were described as "standard for the Game Gear", but the two-player via console sharing was lauded, but also described as "clumsy". Computer and Video Games's Deniz Ahmet had a similar opinion to GamePro's reviewer by describing the graphics as "well designed", and also had an opinion similar to that of Mean Machines Sega, with regards to the two-players sharing function. The conversion was described as "extremely accurate". Sega Master Force's reviewer liked the originality and addictiveness, and described the Game Gear version as "fantastic". The Master System version was complimented by Mean Machines Sega for its two-player mode, describing it as "timeless", "great fun", and an "absolutely essential purchase"—but with "flat" graphics. French magazine Player One eulogised the Master System version's two-player mode and echoed Mean Machines Sega's opinion by describing the game as "A must", and in their Game Gear review, a similar compliment was made, calling it original and "well done". The Game Gear and Master System versions were reviewed together by a reviewer from German magazine Mega Fun, who complimented their humour. The animation of the Game Gear version was described by Joypad as "breathtaking", and that of the Master System version was described as "excellent". Their sprites were criticised, saying the Master System version deletes sprites when there is an excess of vehicles on screen, and the Game Gear version's sprites suffer slowdowns and blinks.

Critics had mixed opinions on the Amiga version's graphics and sound. Amiga Joker and French magazine Amiga Dream's reviewers liked them, but CU Amiga's criticised the graphics as "poorly detailed" and the sound as "simple". The One's reviewer's lauded the two-player mode, described as "the best two-player racing game we've ever seen". Stuart Campbell of Amiga Power's praised the locations and control, although he criticised the "limited" single-player mode and lack of parallax scrolling. Paul Roundell of Amiga Action praised the originality, but criticised the head-to-head mode, saying it "breaks the excitement". A reviewer from Amiga Computing believed the tracks were "entertaining" and liked that they were made up of "silly things". The vehicles racing in the environments was described by Steve Bradley of Amiga Format as "absolutely bloody brilliant", and he also praised the addictiveness.

Other versions were also well received. Reviewing the NES version, Mega Fun praised the scrolling and controls. Skyler Miller of AllGame believed Micro Machines's graphics push the console's capabilities, and also liked the colourful scenery. GamePro's reviewer stated that the racing scenario variety and the vehicles being based on Galoob's Micro Machines toys made the game original. Mean Machines's reviewer liked the presentation and playability, but described the sprites as "inconsistent". In a review of the SNES version, GamePro lauded the "cartoony" graphics and "cheerful" sound effects, along with the lack of car customisation to keep the gameplay "basic". Coming Soon Magazine's reviewer criticised the PC version's "simple" graphics, but thought highly of its addictiveness and "well-produced" animation.

=== Accolades ===
In 1995, Total! rated Micro Machines 5th In their Top 100 SNES Games. They praised the game calling it a "Uniquely designed experience" and they praised the top-down view, control system and the opponents A.I. that it works perfectly. In 1996, Next Generation ranked Micro Machines as number 18 on their "Top 100 Games of All Time", citing the "heart-pounding, adrenaline-pumping action", split-second accurate controls, and perfect balance. Micro Machines was listed by The Guardian in June 2014 as one of the 30 best British video games. The NES version is 31 in IGN's Top 100 NES Games, the highest ranked unlicensed game.
