= Kwik Snax =

1990 video game

- Amiga cover art
- Developer: Oliver Twins
- Publisher: Codemasters
- Series: Dizzy
- Platforms: Amstrad CPC, ZX Spectrum, Commodore 64, Amiga, Atari ST, MS-DOS
- Release: November 1990
- Genre: Maze
- Mode: Single-player

Kwik Snax is a maze video game play developed by the Oliver Twins and was published in 1990 by Codemasters for the Amstrad CPC, Spectrum, Commodore 64, MS-DOS, and Amiga. It was the fifth game in the Dizzy series and is considered a sequel to Fast Food.

After the Oliver twins had completed Operation Gunship they wanted to release another puzzle game similar to Fast Food which only required two weeks of development time, but unexpectedly it required much more time.

The Rear cover (Amstrad version) says: "Dizzy to the rescue! Outwit Zaks' court jesters, bumble bees, clockwork mice and more in the Land of Personality. Mega features and fantastic fun in the incredibly playable, action packed, arcade puzzle game!"

== Reception ==
Reception

Review scores
Publication	Score
Crash	92/100 (Spectrum)
Your Sinclair	92/100 (Spectrum)
Zzap!64	80/100 (C64)
Amiga Format	80% (Amiga)
Amiga Action	74% (Amiga)

Award
Publication	Award
Crash	Smash

Kwik Snax received a 92/100 from both Your Sinclair and Crash magazines.

The Commodore 64 port, which was different even in gameplay from the ZX Spectrum, did not have such a glamorous reception. Zzap!64 awarded 80/100, mentioning a lack of polish on the graphics and AI of the game.
