= Professional Ski Simulator =

1987 video game

- Developer: The Oliver Twins
- Publisher: Codemasters
- Platforms: ZX Spectrum; Commodore 64; Amstrad CPC; Atari ST; Amiga
- Release: 1987
- Genre: Sports
- Modes: Single-player, multiplayer

Professional Ski Simulator is an isometric 3D sports simulation game released by Codemasters in 1987 for the ZX Spectrum, Commodore 64, and Amstrad CPC. It was later released for the Atari ST and Amiga as Advanced Ski Simulator.

== Gameplay ==
Gameplay consists of simulated downhill skiing of increasing difficulty. Players can race against each other, or against the computer. The slope must be completed passing through all of the checkpoints and within a time limit. The game is viewed in overhead isometric 3D perspective.

The game screen always tracks the leading contestant, so if a player falls too far behind he will lose sight of his skier. However, an icon map in the corner of the screen shows the locations of both players and the checkpoints, enabling a skilled player to still complete the race.

== Reviews ==
Sinclair User wrote in 1987:

The slopes are the best part of the game. A delight to see, they are beautifully designed using clever shading to give the impression of different gradients. Another great game by the Ollie bros... Well done lads, more please, more.
