= Oliver Twins =

British video game designer duo

The Oliver Twins
- Born: Andrew Nicholas Oliver; Philip Edward Oliver; 17 October 1967 (age 59); Trowbridge, England
- Education: Clarendon School, Trowbridge
- Occupation: Game developers
- Known for: Developer of Dizzy series

Andrew Nicholas Oliver and Philip Edward Oliver, together known as the Oliver Twins, are British twin brothers and video game designers.

They developed computer games while they were still at school, contributing their first type-in game to a magazine in 1983. They worked with publishers Codemasters for a number of years following their first collaboration Super Robin Hood, creating the Dizzy series of games and many of Codemasters' Simulator Series games. In 1990 they founded Interactive Studios which later became Blitz Games Studios. In October 2013 they founded Radiant Worlds, based in Leamington Spa, with long time friend and colleague Richard Smithies.

== History ==
Philip and Andrew Oliver first began programming computer games while at school (Clarendon School in Trowbridge). They discovered their interest in computing when their brother bought a used ZX 81 when they were 13. They bought a faster Dragon 32 in September 1982, with more memory. They tried to improve the type-in games they found in magazines and eventually created their own game, Road Runner, which was published as written code in Computer and Video Games Magazine in January 1984. The same year they won first prize in a national TV competition (The Saturday Show) to design a computer game.

=== Codemasters ===
Their first game for Codemasters, Super Robin Hood for the Amstrad CPC, was published in 1986. The Codemasters publishing relationship led to the origin of the Dizzy series and the Simulator series.

=== Interactive Studios (Blitz Games Studios) ===
In 1990, at the age of 22, they started Interactive Studios, later called Blitz Games Studios. Apart from their own games, the Oliver Twins were also responsible for porting a number of other prominent games to the Sega platforms, including Theme Park and Syndicate.

After 23 years, Blitz Games folded in 2013, with the loss of 175 staff, and owing millions to creditors.

=== Radiant Worlds ===
In October 2013 they founded Radiant Worlds, based in Leamington Spa, UK, with long time friend and colleague Richard Smithies to develop SkySaga: Infinite Isles for Korean-based Smilegate. SkySaga was an ambitious online voxel based game based on an original concept by members of the Blitz Games Studios team. In August 2017 Smilegate put SkySaga on hold and the Olivers and Smithies put the company up for sale. In January 2018, Rebellion, a UK games developer and publisher, purchased the company and renamed it to Rebellion (Warwick). The twins remained with Rebellion until February 2019, at which point they left to form a game consultancy business.

=== Dizzy revival ===
In 2015 Philip Oliver found a hand drawn map titled Wonderland Dizzy while preparing for a talk the twins were due to give at that year's Play Blackpool event. After looking around further, a disk was found which contained the full uncompiled source code of a game with the same name which they had written 22 years earlier for the NES but had forgotten about. The twins came into contact with Lukasz Kur via a Dizzy fansite, who fixed a few bugs in the game's code and translated it into a few languages before compiling it. The game was released online and free to play on 24 October 2015. In 2016, they released a second lost Dizzy game, Mystery World Dizzy, which was originally scheduled for release on the Nintendo in 1993. In May 2017 the twins announced they would be working on a new Dizzy game, their first for over 20 years. In a video for the ZX Spectrum Next Kickstarter campaign they revealed the game would be inspired by The Wonderful Wizard of Oz by L. Frank Baum, and would be called Wonderful Dizzy.

== Leadership ==
Both of the Olivers take an active role in supporting the UK games industry. Philip Oliver is one of the founders of developers' trade body TIGA and has served as an active board member (currently a director) since its inception in 2001. He was also a director on the board for e-skills UK for several years.

The brothers received honorary doctorates in 2008 from Coventry University (in business administration (DBA) and technology (DTech) for Philip and Andrew respectively) in recognition of their contribution to the growth of the electronic games industry both regionally and internationally, and were honoured as Fellows of the Royal Society of Arts in 2010.

After Philip attended the launch of the UK Government's Next Gen Report (also known as the Livingstone-Hope Report) in February 2011 about challenges faced by the UK Games industry, he established Made in Creative UK which with Andrew they run as a not for profit campaign to raise awareness of the world class game developers and digital creatives developers based in the UK. The campaign has over 350 supporting companies and many high-profile supporters, including Sajid Javid MP (Culture Secretary & Secretary of State for Business, Innovation and Skills).

The Oliver Twins' early games and story inspired many people to develop video games as a career, and this was captured in Chris Wilkins and Roger Kean's book Let's Go Dizzy: The Story of the Oliver Twins, published December 2016 through Fusion Retro Books.

A video shot at the launch of the book entitled Videogame Legends – Computerphile prompted Markus "Notch" Persson, the creator of Minecraft, to tweet that he was one of those inspired by the Oliver Twins games: "I grew up loving and being inspired by their work."

In December 2017 Guinness World Records awarded the Oliver Twins the record for "Most Prolific 8-bit videogame developers". They developed 26 different commercially released games for 8-bit computers and consoles from 1984 to 1992 and wrote a total of 49 games overall, taking into account titles released for multiple platforms.

== Games developed ==
- Road Runner - (Computer & Video Games Magazine) December 1983 - Dragon 32 (Type-in listing)
- Gambit (initially called Strategy) - (Acornsoft) April 1984 - BBC Model B
- Tellscope - (Acorn User) November 1984 - BBC Model B
- Easy Art - (Interceptor Micros) - Amstrad CPC (Original written for the BBC Model B for Firebird but never released)
- Cavey - (Players) - BBC Model B
- Panda Sprites - (Interceptor Micros) - Amstrad CPC
- Rescue Mission - (Beebug) - BBC Model B
- Magic Maths - (Players) - Amstrad CPC
- Magic Clock - (Players) - Amstrad CPC
- Killapede - (Players) - Amstrad CPC
- Excaliber - half complete & unreleased - Amstrad CPC
- Super Robin Hood – (Codemasters) November 1986 – Amstrad CPC, ZX Spectrum, C64, ST, Amiga, NES
- Ghost Hunters – (Codemasters) February 1987 – Amstrad CPC, ZX Spectrum, C64
- Grand Prix Simulator – (Codemasters) April 1987 – Amstrad CPC, ZX Spectrum, C64, Atari ST, Amiga
- Dizzy - The Ultimate Cartoon Adventure – (Codemasters) June 1987 – Amstrad CPC, ZX Spectrum, C64
- Professional Ski Simulator – (Codemasters) October 1987 – Amstrad CPC, ZX Spectrum, C64, Atari ST, Amiga
- 3D Starfighter – (Codemasters) November 1987 – Amstrad CPC, ZX Spectrum
- Fruit Machine Simulator – (Codemasters) February 1988 – ZX Spectrum, Amstrad CPC, C64, Atari ST, Amiga
- Treasure Island Dizzy – (Codemasters) August 1988 – Amstrad CPC, ZX Spectrum, C64, Atari ST, Amiga, NES, PC DOS
- Advanced Pinball Simulator – (Codemasters) October 1988 – Amstrad CPC, ZX Spectrum, C64
- Pro BMX Simulator – (Codemasters) November 1988 – C64, Amstrad CPC, ZX Spectrum, Atari ST, Amiga
- Fast Food Dizzy – (Codemasters) December 1988 – Amstrad CPC, ZX Spectrum, C64, Atari ST, Amiga, PC DOS
- Grand Prix Simulator II – (Codemasters) February 1989 – Amstrad CPC, ZX Spectrum, C64
- The Race Against Time – (Codemasters) May 1989 – Amstrad CPC, ZX Spectrum, C64
- Jet Bike Simulator – (Codemasters) September 1989 – Amstrad CPC, ZX Spectrum, C64, Atari ST, Amiga
- Incredible Shrinking Sphere – (published by Activision) October 1988 – C64, Amstrad CPC, ZX Spectrum, Atari ST, Amiga
- Fantasy World Dizzy – (Codemasters) October 1989 – Amstrad CPC, ZX Spectrum, C64, Atari ST, Amiga, PC
- Ghostbusters II (published by Activision) August 1989 – C64, Amstrad CPC, ZX Spectrum, Atari ST, Amiga
- Operation Gunship – (Codemasters) August 1989 – Amstrad CPC, ZX Spectrum, C64
- Kwik Snax – (Codemasters) November 1989 – Amstrad CPC, ZX Spectrum, C64, Atari ST, Amiga, PC
- Magicland Dizzy – (Codemasters) February 1990 – Amstrad CPC, ZX Spectrum, C64, Atari ST, Amiga, PC
- Dizzy Panic! – (Codemasters) May 1990 – Amstrad CPC, ZX Spectrum, C64, Master System, Game Gear
- Dizzy Prince of the Yolkfolk – (Codemasters) August 1990 – Amstrad CPC, ZX Spectrum, C64, Atari ST, Amiga, PC
- Bubble Dizzy – (Codemasters) November 1990 – Amstrad CPC, ZX Spectrum, C64, Atari ST, Amiga, PC
- Spellbound Dizzy – (Codemasters) December 1990 – Amstrad CPC, ZX Spectrum, C64, Atari ST, Amiga, PC
- Dizzy Down the Rapids – (Codemasters) April 1991 – Amstrad CPC, ZX Spectrum, C64
- Fantastic Dizzy – (Codemasters) April 1992 – NES, Amiga, Mega Drive/Genesis, PC, Game Boy, Master System, Game Gear.
- Firehawk – (Codemasters) September 1992 – NES, Atari ST, Amiga
- Crystal Kingdom Dizzy – (Codemasters) December 1992 – Amstrad CPC, ZX Spectrum, C64, Atari ST, Amiga, PC
- Robin Hood Legend Quest – (Codemasters) January 1993 – NES (Quattro Adventure), Atari ST, Amiga,
- Dizzy The Adventurer – (Codemasters) November 1992 – NES (Bundled with Aladdin)
- Go! Dizzy Go! – (Codemasters) November 1992 – NES (Quattro Arcade)
- BMX Simulator – (Codemasters) March 1993 – NES (Quattro Sports)
- The Excellent Dizzy Collection – (Codemasters) November 1993 – Master System, Game Gear
- Wonderland Dizzy – (FusionRetro Kickstarter) November 2015 – NES
- Dreamworld Pogie – (FusionRetro Kickstarter) May 2017 – NES
- Mystery World Dizzy – (FusionRetro Kickstarter) February 2018 – NES

Key to formats...

They are in order of release, the first in the list being the first and main version, from which others were derived.

Bold Designed and written by The Oliver Twins.

Plain Font Converted by other people to these formats.

Bold + Italic Converted to these formats by The Oliver Twins.

=== Later games (Developed after 1993) ===
Games created or published by Complex Software, Interactive Studios, Blitz Games Studios, and Radiant Worlds:

- Puss in Boots (Q4 2011)
- Michael Phelps: Push the Limit (Q4 2011)
- SpongeBob's Surf and Skate Roadtrip (Q4 2011)
- Fantastic Pets (2011)
- Yoostar 2 (2011)
- Droplitz Delight (2010)
- SFG Soccer: Football Fever (2010) – Published by Blitz 1UP
- The Biggest Loser: Ultimate Workout (2010)
- The Biggest Loser Challenge (2010)
- Dead to Rights: Retribution (2010)
- All Star Karate (2010)
- Biggest Loser (2009)
- Karaoke Revolution (2009)
- iCarly (2009)
- KrissX (2009)- Published by Blitz 1UP
- Fluttabyes (2009)- Published by Blitz 1UP
- Mole Control (2009)- Published by Blitz 1UP
- Clover: A Curious Tale (2009)- Published by Blitz 1UP
- Invincible Tiger: The Legend of Han Tao (Q4 2009)
- Droplitz (Q3 2009)
- PowerUp Forever (2008)
- Buccaneer: The Pursuit of Infamy (2008)- Published by Blitz 1UP
- Karaoke Revolution Presents: American Idol Encore 2 (2008)
- Are You Smarter Than a 5th Grader? Make the Grade (2008)
- Bratz Girlz Really Rock (2008)
- Tak and the Guardians of Gross (2008)
- Project Aftermath (2008)- Published by Blitz 1UP
- Karaoke Revolution Presents: American Idol Encore (2008)
- SpongeBob SquarePants – Underpants Slam (2007)
- Bratz: The Movie (video game) (2007)
- Karaoke Revolution Presents: American Idol (2007)
- Big Bumpin' (2006)
- PocketBike Racer (2006)
- Sneak King (2006)
- SpongeBob SquarePants: Creature from the Krusty Krab (2006)
- Bratz: Forever Diamondz (2006)
- Reservoir Dogs (2006)
- Pac-Man World 3 (2005)
- Bratz: Rock Angelz (2005)
- The Fairly OddParents: Shadow Showdown (2004)
- Bad Boys: Miami Takedown (2004)
- Barbie Horse Adventures: Wild Horse Rescue (2003)
- The Fairly OddParents: Breakin' Da Rules (2003)
- Zapper: One Wicked Cricket (2002)
- Taz: Wanted (2002)
- Lilo & Stitch: Trouble in Paradise (2002)
- Fuzion Frenzy (2001)
- The Mummy Returns (2001)
- Chicken Run (2000)
- The Little Mermaid II: Return to the Sea (2000)
- Frogger 2: Swampy's Revenge (2000)
- Action Man: Destruction X (2000)
- Action Man: Mission Xtreme (1999)
- Glover (1999)
- WarGames (1998)

Radiant Worlds

- SkySaga: Infinite Isles (Alpha released Q4 2014)
