= Camerica =

Canadian video game publisher

- Industry: Video games
- Founded: April 13, 1987; 39 years ago
- Founder: David J. Harding
- Defunct: 1993
- Fate: Bankruptcy
- Headquarters: Ontario, Canada
- Products: Game Genie, Aladdin Deck Enhancer

Camerica was a Canadian video game company founded in 1988. It released various unlicensed video games and accessories for the Nintendo Entertainment System, such as the Game Genie and Aladdin Deck Enhancer, and was the North American publisher for British developer Codemasters.

== History ==
The company was owned and operated by David J. Harding and was originally formed in 1988 as a wholesale association with giftware such as Waterford Crystal and Blue Mountain Pottery.

The company entered the video game market, featuring Nintendo World Championship of 1990 winner Thor Aackerlund as the spokesperson, considered one of the first professional gamers. Camerica held the rights to publish most Nintendo Entertainment System games from Codemasters in North America. Camerica also released the Codemasters-designed Game Genie in Canada and the UK. They had a distribution deal with toy company Galoob. The company created several early peripherals for the NES, including the Aladdin Deck Enhancer expansion peripheral and Supersonic: the Joystick a.k.a. Turbotronic, a wireless controller.

Camerica was notable for being an unlicensed distributor, reverse engineering cartridges that would bypass Nintendo's 10NES lock-out chip. Like the circuit used in Color Dreams cartridges, Camerica's workaround generates glitch pulses that freeze the lock-out chip. These cartridges are shaped and colored slightly differently from Nintendo's official cartridges, though they still fit in the NES. All Camerica cartridges were originally produced gold-colored, and later silver.

In Lewis Galoob Toys, Inc. v. Nintendo of America, Inc, Galoob, distributor of Camerica products in the United States, was ruled not an infringer of the Copyright Act because the Game Genie was not a derivative work and was protected by fair use.

In Nintendo of America Inc. v. Camerica Corp (1991), it was held that it did not violate Nintendo's trademark for Camerica to advertise compatibility with the NES despite being an unlicensed distributor.

Camerica declared bankruptcy and ceased operations in 1993.

== Games ==
- Bee 52
- Big Nose Freaks Out
- Big Nose the Caveman
- Dizzy the Adventurer
- Fantastic Adventures of Dizzy
- FireHawk
- Linus Spacehead's Cosmic Crusade
- Micro Machines
- MiG-29: Soviet Fighter
- Quattro Adventure
- Quattro Arcade
- Quattro Sports
- Stunt Kids
- The Ultimate Stuntman

== See also ==
- List of Nintendo Entertainment System games
