= Dizzy Down the Rapids =

1991 video game

- Publisher: Codemasters
- Programmers: Paul Black (C64); Paul Griffiths (CPC/Spec)
- Composers: Allister Brimble (CPC, C64, Spec)
- Series: Dizzy
- Platforms: Amstrad CPC, ZX Spectrum, Commodore 64
- Release: April 1991
- Genre: Action
- Modes: Single-player, multiplayer

Dizzy Down the Rapids is an action video game published in 1991 by Codemasters for the Amstrad CPC, ZX Spectrum, and Commodore 64.

The game involves Dizzy riding barrels down a river avoiding obstacles and enemies. It is based on the 1988 arcade video game Toobin'. The C64 version by Paul Black was originally called Toobin' Turtles. When the game was taken to Codemasters for consideration, it was rebranded to take advantage of the Dizzy character.
