= Bubble Dizzy =

1990 video game

- Developer: Oliver Twins
- Publisher: Codemasters
- Series: Dizzy
- Platforms: Amstrad CPC, ZX Spectrum, Commodore 64, Amiga, Atari ST, MS-DOS
- Release: November 1990
- Genres: Action, platform
- Mode: Single-player

Bubble Dizzy is an arcade style action video game developed by the Oliver Twins and published in November 1990 by Codemasters for the Amstrad, Spectrum, MS-DOS, Atari ST, Commodore 64 and Amiga.

== Gameplay ==
The game involves Dizzy being forced to walk the plank of a pirate ship and from the sea bed use bubbles to float back to the surface and dry land.

== Reception ==
The game received mixed to negative reviews, with critics commenting positively on the colorful graphics but negatively on the difficulty. Warren Lapworth of Crash called it "the worst Dizzy game ever...makes eating soup with a fork look easy." James Leach of Your Sinclair magazine stated the gameplay "relies tremendously on luck" and noted its more straightforward, arcade-style mechanics compared to other Dizzy games.
