= Grand Prix Simulator =

1987 video game

- Developer: Codemasters
- Publisher: Codemasters
- Designer: The Oliver Twins
- Artist: Mervin James
- Composers: David Whittaker; Allister Brimble (Amiga)
- Platforms: Amstrad CPC, Atari 8-bit, Commodore 64, ZX Spectrum
- Release: Amstrad CPC: EU: 1987; Commodore 64: EU: 1987
- Genre: Racing
- Modes: Single-player, 2 players

Grand Prix Simulator is a racing game developed by The Oliver Twins and published by Codemasters for the ZX Spectrum, Amstrad CPC, Commodore 64, and Atari 8-bit computers. The ZX Spectrum conversion was done by Serge Dosang. The game was endorsed by Ayrton Senna's 1986 Formula One teammate Johnny Dumfries.

A sequel, Grand Prix Simulator II, was released in 1988 for the same platforms.

== Gameplay ==
Atari 8-bit screenshot

The game is designed so that the player is looking down on the track from an overhead view, similar to arcade games such as Badlands or Super Off Road. The player controls one car on the track, while the computer controls the other. Each race is three laps around the track. If the player wins a race, they progress to the next track. The game is over when the player loses a race or crashes.

Points are earned for winning a race and extra points are given for picking up bonus items that appear on the track. Oil spots can also appear on the track that, if driven over, cause the player's car to spin, losing time.

The game can also be played competitively by two players.

== Reception ==
Reception

Review scores
Publication	Score
Crash	42%
Sinclair User	8/10
Your Sinclair	7/10
Amstrad Computer User	19/20

Grand Prix Simulator was rated an average of 19/20 in Amstrad Computer User magazine, 7 out of 10 by Your Sinclair and, across all platforms, sold over a quarter of a million copies.
