= Dizzy – The Ultimate Cartoon Adventure =

1987 video game

Dizzy - The Ultimate Cartoon Adventure
- Publisher: Codemasters
- Designer: Oliver Twins
- Series: Dizzy
- Platforms: Commodore 64, Amstrad CPC, ZX Spectrum
- Release: 1987
- Genres: Adventure, platform
- Mode: Single-player

Dizzy (also known as Dizzy —The Ultimate Cartoon Adventure) is a 1987 adventure-platform game developed by the Oliver Twins and published by Codemasters. It is the first game in the Dizzy series.

== Gameplay ==
The game is a platform adventure where Dizzy must search the fairy tale land of Katmandu for a Leprechaun's Wig, a Cloud's Silver Lining, a Vampire Dux Feather, and a Troll Brew and deposit them in a cauldron to make a potion to defeat the evil wizard Zaks. The gameplay involves collecting items and moving to other locations where the item is required; for example, at one point a raincoat is needed to protect against damaging rain. This is made more difficult because only one item can be carried at any given time.

Unlike later games in the series, which focus more on the inventory-based puzzles, this game features a very large number of hazards that kill the player on contact. With only three lives initially to complete the game, this made the game challenging to complete.

== Development ==
The Oliver Twins said in an interview, on the British television show When Games Attack, that the character Dizzy was originally not supposed to be an egg at all but just a face with hands and feet. They then said they accepted everyone thought he was an egg and decided to go with that. They also said they used to plan out levels on the back of spare rolls of wallpaper.

Dizzy gets his name from the character's tumbles and somersaults while jumping, a feature inspired by the Oliver Twins' graphics software Panda Sprites which enabled them to rotate an image easily so each frame did not have to be manually drawn. The software distorted complex sprites so the character was required to be simple, hence the choice of an egg.

== Reception ==
Reception

Review scores
Publication	Score
Crash	78%
Sinclair User	9/10
Your Sinclair	7/10
ACE	788

In 2017, the game was placed on Eurogamer's "10 games that defined the ZX Spectrum" list.
