= Fast Food (1989 video game) =

Video game

- Developer: Oliver Twins
- Publisher: Codemasters
- Composers: David Whittaker (ZX, CPC); Allister Brimble (Amiga)
- Series: Dizzy
- Platforms: Amiga, Amstrad CPC, Atari ST, Commodore 64, MS-DOS, Enterprise, Switch, ZX Spectrum
- Release: April 1989
- Genre: Maze
- Mode: Single-player

Fast Food (sometimes referred to as Fast Food Dizzy) is the title of two slightly different maze video games in the vein of Pac-Man. Both feature Dizzy, who is an anthropomorphic egg designed by the British-born Oliver Twins. The game was originally released in April 1989 and published by Codemasters. It is the third title to feature Dizzy.

The 8-bit versions of the game were released for the ZX Spectrum, Commodore 64, and Amstrad CPC with mazes of abstract design. The 16-bit versions released for the Amiga, Atari ST and MS-DOS have environments that are identifiable as real-world locations such as gardens, harbours, and graveyards.

== Gameplay ==
The goal in each maze is for Dizzy to gather all of the burgers, pizzas, and other food. Some food items move around the maze, either evading Dizzy or trying to meet him. Dizzy is pursued by four mushroom-like monsters: Bonzo, Wizza, Pippa, and Fido. Power-ups can be collected to either improve Dizzy or hurt the monsters. Some maze walls are breakable.

== Development ==
Commodore 64 version

The game was playable within three days of work; the developers only took two more weeks to finalize the graphics, interface and music.

The game was originally to be a marketing tool for the Happy Eater chain of restaurants, but this idea was dropped during development and Dizzy was added to the game.

== Legacy ==
A shortened, altered version of the game, entitled Easter Eggstravaganza Dizzy, was made available on Amiga Action and ST Action cover discs in May 1993. Completion of this game would give players a code which would allow them to enter a competition in the magazine.

In November 2020, a completely new version of Fast Food was released for the Nintendo Switch as Fast Food Dizzy. It was developed and published by the Oliver Twins on the FUZE program for the console.
