= List of Commodore 64 games (A–M) =

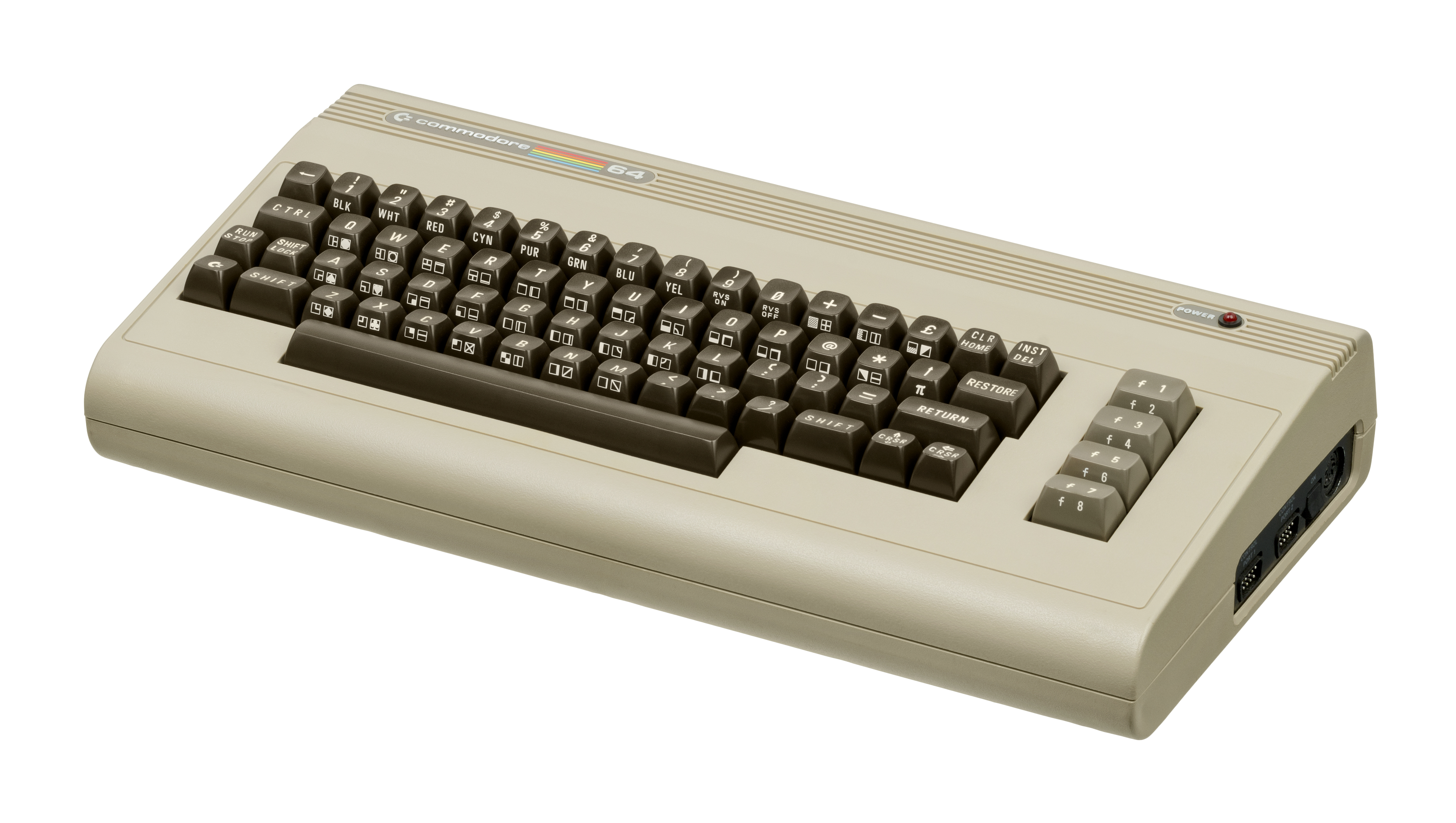
The Commodore 64

This is a list of game titles released for the Commodore 64 personal computer system, sorted alphabetically.

== 0–9 ==
- $100,000 Pyramid
- 007: Licence to Kill
- 10 Knockout!
- 10-Pin Bowling
- 10th Frame
- 10000 Meters
- 180
- 19 Part One: Boot Camp
- 1942
- 1943: One Year After
- 1943: The Battle of Midway
- 1985: The Day After
- 1994: Ten Years After
- 1st Division Manager
- 2001
- 221B Baker Street
- 3-D Breakout
- 3-D Labyrinth
- 3-D Skramble
- 3D Construction Kit
- 3D Glooper
- 3D Tanx
- 4 Soccer Simulators
- 4th & Inches
- 4x4 Off-Road Racing
- 50 Mission Crush
- 5th Gear
- 720°
- 720° Part 2
- 911 Tiger Shark (911 TS)

== A ==
- Aaargh!
- Aardvark
- ABC Monday Night Football
- Abrakadabra
- Accolade's Comics
- ACE - Air Combat Emulator
- Ace 2
- ACE 2088
- Ace Harrier
- Ace of Aces
- Acrojet
- Action Biker
- Action Fighter
- Action Force
- Adam Norton's Ultimate Soccer
- The Addams Family
- Addicta Ball
- ADIDAS Championship Football
- Adrenalin
- Adult Poker
- Advance to Boardwalk
- Advanced Dungeons & Dragons: Heroes of the Lance
- Advanced Basketball Simulator
- Advanced Pinball Simulator
- Adventure Construction Set
- Adventure Master
- Adventure Quest
- Adventureland
- Adventures in Narnia: Dawn Treader
- Adventures in Narnia: Narnia
- Aegean Voyage
- After Burner
- After The War
- Afterlife
- Afterlife II
- Afterlife v1.0
- Afterlife v2.0
- Aftermath
- Afrikan tähti
- Agent Orange
- Agent USA
- Agent X
- Agent X II: The Mad Prof's Back
- Ah Diddums
- Aigina's Prophecy
- Air Support
- Airborne Ranger
- Airwolf
- Airwolf II
- Alcazar: The Forgotten Fortress
- ALF: The First Adventure
- ALF in the Color Caves
- Alice in Videoland
- Alice in Wonderland
- Alien (graphics adventure)
- Alien
- Alien 3
- Alien Storm
- Alien Syndrome
- Aliens: The Computer Game
- Alter Ego
- Alleykat
- Altered Beast
- Alter Ego: Female Version
- Alter Ego: Male Version
- Alternate Reality: The City
- Alternate Reality: The Dungeon
- Alternative World Games
- Amadeus Revenge
- Amaurote
- The Amazing Spider-Man
- Amazon Warrior
- Amazon
- America's Cup
- American Tag-Team Wrestling
- Amnesia
- Anarchy
- Andy Capp: The Game
- Annals of Rome
- Annihilator
- Annihilator II
- Another World (1990) (Double Density)
- Another World (1991) (CP Verlag)
- Another World (1992) (X-Ample)
- Ant Attack
- Antimonopoly
- Antiriad
- Apache
- Apache Gold
- Apache Strike
- Apocalypse Now
- Apollo 18: Mission to the Moon
- Apple Cider Spider
- Arac
- Arachnophobia
- Arcade Classics
- Arcade Flight Simulator
- Arcade Fruit Machine: Cash 'n' Grab
- Arcade Game Construction Kit
- Arcade Pilot
- Arcade Trivia Quiz
- Arcade Volleyball
- Arcadia
- Arcana
- Archipelago
- Archon: The Light and the Dark
- Archon II: Adept
- Archon III: Exciter^{D}
- Arciere^{D}
- Arco^{D}
- ARCOS^{D}
- Arctic Shipwreck^{D}
- Arctic Wastes!^{D}
- Arc of Yesod
- Arcticfox
- Ardant^{D}
- Ardok the Barbarian^{D}
- Ardy the Aardvark
- Area 13^{D}
- Area Estimation^{D}
- Areas^{D}
- Aree^{D}
- Arena^{D}
- Arena 3000^{D}
- Arena Football
- Arenum^{D}
- Arex^{D}
- Argo^{D}
- Argon^{D}
- Argon - L'Orrore di Providence^{D}
- The Argon Factor^{D}
- Argos^{D}
- The Argos Expedition^{D}
- Arhena! The Amazon^{D}
- Arithme-Sketch^{D}
- The Arithmetic Game^{D}
- Arithmetician^{D}
- Arizona^{D}
- Arizona - The Boy in the Bubble^{D}
- The Ark of Exodus^{D}
- Ark Pandora^{D}
- Arkanoid
- Arkanoid: Revenge of Doh
- Armageddon
- The Armageddon Files
- The Armageddon Man
- Armalyte
- Armalyte - Competition Edition
- Armalyte II
- Armourdillo
- Army Moves
- Army Moves II
- Arnie
- Arnie II
- Arnie Armchair's Howzat
- Artillery Duel
- Asterix and the Magic Cauldron
- The Astonishing Adventures of Mr. Weems and the She Vampires
- Astro-Grover
- Asylum
- The Attack of the Phantom Karate Devils
- Ataxx
- ATC - Air Traffic Controller
- ATF
- Athena
- Atlantis
- Atlantis Lode Runner
- Atomic Robo-Kid
- Atomino
- Atomix
- Attack Chopper!
- Attack of the Mutant Camels
- Attack of the PETSCII Robots
- ATV Simulator
- Auf Wiedersehen Monty
- Auf Wiedersehen Pet
- Aufstand der Sioux
- Auggie Doggie and Doggie Daddy
- Aussie Games
- Auto Mania
- Autoduel
- Avenger
- Avenger (Way of the Tiger II)
- Avengers
- Avoid the Noid
- Aztec
- Aztec Challenge
- Aztec Tomb
- Aztec Tomb Revisited

== B ==
- B-1 Nuclear Bomber
- B-24
- B.A.T.
- B.C. Bill
- B.C.'s Quest for Tires
- B.C. II: Grog's Revenge
- Baal
- Back to the Future
- Back to the Future Part II
- Back to the Future Part III
- Backgammon
- Bad Blood
- Bad Dudes Vs. Dragon Ninja
- Bad Street Brawler
- Badballs
- Badlands
- Bagitman
- Ballblazer
- Ballistix
- Balloonacy
- Ballyhoo
- Baltic 1985: Corridor to Berlin
- Bandits
- Bangers and Mash
- Bangkok Knights
- Barbarian
- Barbarian II: The Dungeon of Drax
- Barbarian: The Ultimate Warrior
- Barbie
- The Bard's Tale
- The Bard's Tale II: The Destiny Knight
- The Bard's Tale III: Thief of Fate
- Baron: The Real Estate Simulation
- Barry McGuigan World Championship Boxing
- Basil the Great Mouse Detective
- Basket Master
- Batalyx
- Batman
- Batman: The Caped Crusader
- Battle Chess (1989) by Interplay
- Battle Chess (1992)
- Battle of Britain
- Battle Through Time
- Battle Valley
- Battles of Napoleon
- Battleships
- BattleTech: The Crescent Hawk's Inception
- Battlezone
- Batty
- Bay Street
- Bazooka Bill
- Beach Buggy Simulator
- Beach-Head
- Beach Head II: The Dictator Strikes Back
- Beach Head III
- Beach Volley
- Beaky and the Egg Snatchers
- Beamrider
- Bear Bovver
- Beat-it
- Beatle Quest
- Bee 52
- Beer Belly Burt's Brew Biz
- Below the Root
- Berserker Raids
- Benji: Space Rescue
- Betrayal
- Better Dead Than Alien
- Beverly Hills Cop
- Beyond Castle Wolfenstein
- Beyond Dark Castle
- Beyond the Black Hole
- Beyond the Forbidden Forest
- Beyond the Ice Palace
- Big Bird's Funhouse
- Big Bird's Special Delivery
- Big Deal, The
- Big Game Fishing
- Biggles
- Big Mac
- Big Trouble in Little China
- Bill & Ted's Excellent Adventure
- Bilbo the Hobbit
- Bionic Commando by Go!
- Bionic Commando (USA Version) by Capcom
- Bionic Granny
- Bird Mother
- The Birds and the Bees II: Antics
- Black by Island Software
- Black Crystal
- Black Gold (1983) by Photronics
- Black Gold (1989) by reLINE Software
- Black Gold (1992) by Starbyte Software
- Black Hawk
- Black Lamp
- Black Magic
- Black Tiger
- Blackwyche
- The Blade of Blackpool
- Blade Runner
- Blades of Steel
- Blagger
- Blagger Construction Set
- Blagger goes to Hollywood
- Blasteroids
- Blinky's Scary School
- Blitzkrieg
- Blockout
- Blood Brothers
- Blood Money
- Bloodwych
- Blue Encounter, The
- Blue Max
- Blue Max 2001
- Blue Moon
- Blue Thunder
- Blues Brothers, The
- BMX Kidz
- BMX Simulator
- BMX Racers by Mastertronic
- BMX Trials
- Bobby Bearing
- The Boggit
- Bomb Jack
- Bomb Jack 2
- Bombo
- Bombuzal
- Bonanza Bros.
- Bonecruncher
- Bonka
- Booty
- Bop'n Rumble
- Bop'n Wrestle
- Border Zone
- Bored of the Rings
- Borrowed Time
- Bosconian
- Boss
- Boulder Dash
- Boulder Dash II: Rockford's Revenge
- Boulder Dash III
- Boulder Dash Construction Kit
- Bounces
- Bounder
- Bounty Bob
- Bounty Bob Strikes Back!
- Bounzy
- Bozo's Night Out
- Bram Stoker's Dracula
- BraveStarr
- Break Dance
- Breakout
- Breakout Construction Kit
- Breakstreet
- Breakthrough in the Ardennes
- Breakthru
- Brian Bloodaxe
- Brian Jacks Superstar Challenge
- Brian Jack's Uchi Mata
- BrickFast
- Bride of Frankenstein
- Bristles
- Broadsides
- Bruce Lee
- Bruce Lee 2
- Bruce Lee: Return of Fury
- Bubble Bobble
- Bubble Dizzy
- Bubble Ghost
- Buck Rogers: Planet of Zoom
- Buck Rogers: Countdown to Doomsday
- Budokan - The Martial Spirit
- Bugaboo (The Flea)
- Bug Bomber
- Buggy Boy
- Bugs Bunny Private Eye
- Bugsy
- Bumpin' Buggies
- Bump Set Spike
- Bundesliga 98/99
- Bundesliga Live
- Bundesliga Manager
- Bundesliga Manager v2.0
- Bundesliga Manager v3.0
- Bundesliga Manager Polish Version
- BurgerTime
- Burger Time '97
- Burnin' Rubber
- Bushido
- Buster Bros (also known as Pang)
- Butasan
- Butcher Hill
- By Fair Means or Foul

== C ==
- Cabal
- California Games
- Camelot Warriors
- Campaign Manager
- Canyon Cruiser
- Captain America in: The Doom Tube of Dr. Megalomann
- Captain Blood
- Captain Dynamo
- Captain Fizz
- Captain Power
- The Captive
- Capture The Flag
- Captured
- Card Sharks
- Carnage
- Carrier Command
- Castle Master
- Castle Nightmare
- Castle of Terror
- Castle Wolfenstein
- The Castles of Dr. Creep
- Castlevania
- Catalypse
- Catastrophes
- Cauldron
- Cauldron II: The Pumpkin Strikes Back
- Cave Fighter
- Cave of the Word Wizard
- Cavelon
- Cavelon II
- Caveman Games
- Caveman Ughlympics
- Caverns of Eriban
- Centipede
- Challenge of the Gobots
- Chambers of Shaolin
- Championship 3D Snooker
- Champions of Krynn
- Championship Baseball
- Championship Lode Runner
- Championship Lode Runner: Extended Edition
- Championship Lode Runner: Training Missions
- Championship Sprint
- Championship Wrestling
- Chase H.Q.
- Chernobyl
- Cheese Graphics Editor
- Chess 7.0
- Chess 7.5: How About a Nice Game of Chess!
- Chess Analyse
- Chess Champion
- Chess Grand Master
- Chess Quarto
- The Chessmaster 2000
- Chicago
- Chiller
- Chimera
- China Miner
- Chinese Juggler
- Chip's Challenge
- ChipWits
- Cholo
- Choplifter
- Chubbie Chester
- Chubby Gristle
- Chuck Norris Superkicks
- Chuck Rock
- Chuck Yeager's Advanced Flight Trainer
- Chuck Yeager's Flight Trainer
- Chuckie Egg
- Chuckie Egg 2
- Circus Charlie
- Circus Games
- Cisco Heat
- Citadel
- City Fighter
- CJ in the USA
- CJ's Elephant Antics
- Classic Concentration
- Classic Snooker
- Clean Up Service
- Clever & Smart
- Cliffhanger
- Cliffhanger: A Perilous Climb
- Cloud Kingdoms
- Clowns
- Clue Master Detective
- Clue!
- Cluedo
- Clystron
- Cobra
- Coco Notes
- Cohen's Towers
- Colonial Conquest
- Colony
- Colony (1996)
- Colony v3
- Colors
- Colossal Adventure
- Colossal Cave Adventure
- Colossus Chess 2.0
- Colossus Chess 4.0
- The Colour of Magic
- Combat Course
- Combat Crazy
- Combat School
- Comic Bakery
- Commando
- Commando 86
- Commando II
- Commando Libya
- Compunet
- Computer Baseball
- The Computer Edition of Risk: The World Conquest Game
- Computer Football Strategy
- Computer Quarterback
- Conan: Hall of Volta
- Confuzion
- Congo Bongo
- Continental Circus
- Contra
- Conundrum^{D}
- Cool Croc Twins
- Cool World
- Cops 'n' Robbers
- Corporation^{D}
- Corruption
- Corsair^{D}
- Cosmic Causeway: Trailblazer II
- Cosmic Crusader^{D}
- Cosmic Pirate^{D}
- Cosmic Relief: Prof. Renegade to the Rescue^{D}
- Count and Add
- Count, The
- Count Duckula in No Sax Please - We're Egyptian^{D}
- Countdown To Meltdown^{D}
- Cover Girl Strip Poker
- Crack Down
- Crack-Up
- Crazy Balloon
- Crazy Car^{D}
- Crazy Cars^{D}
- Crazy Cars 2^{D}
- Crazy Cars III
- Crazy Comets
- Crazy Kong
- Crazy Sue
- Create with Garfield^{D}
- Creative Contraptions^{D}
- Creatures
- Creatures II: Torture Trouble
- Crime and Punishment
- Crillion
- Crisis Mountain
- The Crimson Crown
- Crossbow
- Crossfire
- Crossroads^{D}
- Crossroads II^{D}
- Crossword Creator^{D}
- Crossword Magic 4.0^{D}
- Crossword Puzzle^{D}
- Crusade in Europe^{D}
- Crush, Crumble and Chomp!
- Crystal Castles
- Crystal Kingdom Dizzy
- Crystals of Zong
- Cubulus^{D}
- Curse of Ra^{D}
- The Curse of Sherwood
- Curse of the Azure Bonds
- Cuthbert Enters the Tombs of Doom
- Cuthbert Goes Walkabout
- Cuthbert in Space^{D}
- Cuthbert in the Jungle^{D}
- Cutthroats
- Cyberball
- Cyberdyne Warrior^{D}
- Cybernoid
- Cybernoid II: The Revenge
- Cybertron Mission
- Cyborg
- The Cycles: International Grand Prix Racing

== D ==
- Dalek Attack
- Daley Thompson's Decathlon
- Daley Thompson's Olympic Challenge^{D}
- Daley Thompson's Super-Test
- Dallas Quest
- The Dam Busters
- Dan Dare: Pilot of the Future
- Dan Dare II: Mekon's Revenge
- Dan Dare III: The Escape
- Dandy^{D}
- Daredevil Dennis
- Dark Castle
- Dark Fusion
- Dark Lord^{D}
- Dark Side
- The Dark Tower^{D}
- Darkman
- David's Midnight Magic
- David's Midnight Magic II^{D}
- Days of Thunder
- DDT^{D}
- Deactivators
- Dead End^{D}
- Dead or Alive^{D}
- Deadline
- Death in the Caribbean^{D}
- Death Bringer
- Death Knights of Krynn
- Death Star^{D}
- Death Wish 3
- Deathlord
- Decisive Battles of the American Civil War Volume 1: Bull Run to Chancellorsville
- Defender
- Defender 64^{D}
- Defender of the Crown
- Deflektor
- Déjà Vu by Ariolasoft-Axis Komputerkunst^{D}
- Déjà Vu by Mindscape
- Deliverance: Stormlord II
- The Delphic Oracle
- Delta
- Delta 16
- Delta Man
- Demon Attack
- Demon Stalkers
- Demon's Winter
- Depthcharge
- Desert Fox
- Designasaurus
- Destroyer
- The Detective
- Deus Ex Machina
- Dick Tracy
- Die Hard
- Die Hard 2: Die Harder
- Dig Dug
- Dinky Doo
- Dino Eggs
- Dino Wars
- Diplomacy
- Dive Bomber
- Dizzy Down the Rapids
- Dizzy Panic!
- Dizzy Prince of the Yolkfolk
- Dizzy: The Ultimate Cartoon Adventure
- DNA Warrior
- Doctor Doom's Revenge
- Doctor Who and the Mines of Terror
- Doctor Who and the Entropilytes
- Doctor Who 2
- Dogfight 2187
- Dogfight!
- Domination
- Dominion
- Donald's Alphabet Chase
- Donald Duck's Playground
- Donkey Kong
- Doomdark's Revenge
- Dot Gobbler
- Double Dare
- Double Dragon
- Double Dragon II: The Revenge
- Double Dragon 3: The Rosetta Stone
- Double Dribble
- Double Take
- Dough Boy
- Draconus
- Dracula
- Drag Race Eliminator
- Dragon Breed
- Dragon Ninja
- Dragon Skulle
- Dragon Spirit
- Dragon Wars
- Dragon's Lair
- Dragons Den
- Dragon's Lair II: Escape from Singe's Castle
- DragonHawk
- Dragonriders of Pern
- Dragons of Flame
- DragonStrike
- Dragonworld
- Drelbs
- Dream House
- Driller
- Drol
- Dropzone
- Druid
- Druid II: Enlightenment
- Duck Shoot
- Ducks Ahoy!
- DuckTales: The Quest for Gold
- Duckula 2: Tremendous Terence
- The Duel by Paradize Software
- The Duel: Test Drive II
- Dungeon
- Dungeon Maker by Ubisoft
- Dungeon of Doom
- Dunzhin
- Duotris
- Dynamic Duo
- Dynamite Dan
- Dynamite Düx
- Dynamix (1988) by Digital Design
- Dynamix (1989) by Mastertronic
- Dynasty Wars

== E ==
- E-Motion
- Eagle Empire
- Earth Orbit Stations
- Echelon
- Eddie Kidd Jump Challenge
- The Eidolon
- Elektra Glide
- Elevator Action
- Elidon
- Elite
- Elm Street
- Elvira: Mistress of the Dark
- Elvira: The Arcade Game
- Elvira II: The Jaws of Cerberus
- Emerald Isle
- Emerald Mine
- Emlyn Hughes International Soccer
- The Empire of Karn
- Empire
- Empire!
- Empire: Wargame of the Century
- Enchanter
- Encounter
- Enduro Racer
- Energy Warrior
- Enigma Force
- Enigma Force Construction Set
- Entity
- Entombed
- Eon
- Equations
- Equinox
- Erebus
- Erik the Viking
- Ernie's Magic Shapes
- Escape from the Planet of the Robot Monsters
- Espionage
- ESWAT: City Under Siege
- E.T.'s Rugby League
- The Eternal Dagger
- Eureka!
- European Champions
- European Football Champ
- Evening Star
- Everest Ascent
- Everyone's a Wally
- The Evil Dead
- Evolution (1982 video game)
- Excalibur
- Exile
- Exolon
- Exploding Fist II: The Legend Continues
- Extended Championship Lode Runner
- Exterminator
- Eye of Horus

== F ==
- F-14 Tomcat
- F-15 Strike Eagle
- F-16 Combat Pilot
- F-18 Hornet
- F-19 Stealth Fighter
- F1 GP Circuits
- F.1 Manager
- F1 Tornado
- Face Off!
- The Faery Tale Adventure
- Fahrenheit 451
- Fairlight
- Falcon Patrol
- Falcon Patrol II
- Fallen Angel by Emerald Software Ltd
- Fantasy World Dizzy
- The Farm Game
- The Farmer's Daughter
- Fast Break
- Fast Eddie
- Fast Food
- Fast Tracks: The Computer Slot Car Construction Kit
- Fay - That Math Woman!
- Fellowship of the Rings
- Felony!
- Fernandez Must Die
- Ferrari Formula One
- Feud
- Fiendish Freddy's Big Top O'Fun
- Fight Night
- Fighter Bomber
- Fighter Command v1.1
- Fighter Pilot
- Fighting Warrior
- Final Assault
- Final Blow
- Final Fight
- Finders Keepers
- Fire Ant
- Fire & Forget II: The Death Convoy
- Fire King
- Fire Power
- Fire Zone
- Firefly
- Firelord
- Firequest
- Firetrack
- First Samurai
- Fish!
- Fish! v1.07
- Fisher-Price: Alpha Build
- Fist II: The Legend Continues
- Fist+
- Flasch Bier
- Flasch Bier Konstruktion Kit
- Flasch Bier 2
- Flash Gordon
- Flight Path 737
- Flight Simulator II
- Flimbo's Quest
- Flintstones: Yabba-Dabba-Dooo!
- Flintstones, The
- Flip & Flop
- Floyd of the Jungle
- Flunky
- Flyer Fox
- Flying Ace
- Flying Shark
- Football Manager
- Football Manager 2
- Football Manager 2 Expansion Kit
- Football Manager 3
- Football Manager World Cup Edition
- Footballer of the Year
- Footballer of the Year 2
- Forbidden Forest
- Forbidden Forest 2: Beyond the Forbidden Forest
- Forgotten Worlds
- Formula 1 Simulator
- Fort Apocalypse
- The Fourth Protocol
- Foxx Fights Back
- Fraction Fever
- Frak!
- Frank Bruno's Boxing
- Frankenstein by CRL
- Frankenstein (1992) by Zeppelin Games
- Frankenstein Jnr.
- Frankie Goes to Hollywood
- Frantic Freddie
- Freak Factory
- Fred
- Freddy Hardest
- Frenzy
- Friday the 13th: The Computer Game
- Frog Run
- Frogger
- Frogger II: ThreeeDeep!
- Frogs and Flies
- Front Line (video game)
- Frostbyte
- Fruit Machine Simulator
- Fruit Machine Simulator 2
- Fun School 2
- Fun School 3
- Fun School 4
- Fun School Specials
- Fungus
- Future Knight

== G ==
- G-Force
- G-LOC: Air Battle
- G.I. Joe: A Real American Hero
- G.U.T.Z.
- Galactic Conquest
- Galactic Empire
- Galactic Frontier (Free Spirit ©1987)
- Galaga
- Galaxian
- Galaxy Force
- Gamma Strike
- Game Over
- Game Over II
- The Games: Summer Edition
- The Games: Winter Edition
- The Games: Winter Edition Practice
- Gangbusters
- Gaplus
- Garfield: Big Fat Hairy Deal
- Garfield: Winter's Tail
- Garrison
- Gary Lineker's Hot Shot!
- Gary Lineker's Super Skills
- Gary Lineker's Superstar Soccer
- Gateway to Apshai
- Gateway to the Savage Frontier
- Gato
- Gauntlet
- Gauntlet: The Deeper Dungeons
- Gauntlet II
- Gauntlet III: The Final Quest
- Gazza II
- Gazza's Superstar Soccer
- GBA Championship Basketball: Two-on-Two
- Gee Bee Air Rally
- Gem'X
- Gemini Wing
- Gemstone Healer
- Gemstone Warrior
- Germany 1985
- Gertrude's Secrets
- Ghetto Blaster
- Ghost Chaser
- Ghost Town
- Ghost Trap
- Ghostbusters
- Ghostbusters II
- Ghosts 'n Goblins
- Ghouls
- Ghouls 'n Ghosts
- Gilligan's Gold
- Give My Regards to Broad Street
- Gladiator
- Glider Rider
- Global Chess
- Global Commander
- Glutton
- Gnome Ranger
- Go Go The Ghost
- Godzilla
- Gold Medal Games
- Golden Axe
- Goldrunner
- The Goonies
- Gorf
- Gradius
- Graeme Souness International Soccer
- Graeme Souness Soccer Manager
- Graham Gooch's All Star Cricket
- Graham Gooch's Test Cricket
- Grandmaster Chess
- Grand Monster Slam
- Grand National
- Grand Prix
- Grand Prix Circuit
- Grand Prix Master
- Grand Prix Simulator
- Grand Prix Simulator 2
- Grand Slam Baseball
- Grange Hill
- Granny's Garden
- Grave Yardage
- Gravitron
- The Great American Cross-Country Road Race
- The Great Escape
- The Great Giana Sisters
- Great Gurianos
- Green Beret (also known as Rush'n Attack)
- Gremlins
- Gremlins: The Adventure
- Gremlins 2: The New Batch
- Gribbly's Day Out
- Gridder
- Gridiron
- Gridrunner
- The Growing Pains of Adrian Mole
- Gruds in Space
- Gryzor
- Guadalcanal
- Guerrilla War
- Guild of Thieves, The
- Gumshoe
- Gunfighters
- Gunship
- Gunslinger
- Gust Buster
- Gyroscope
- Gyroscope Construction Set
- Gyroscope II
- Gyruss

== H ==
- H.A.T.E.
- H.E.R.O.
- Habitat
- Hacker
- Hacker II: The Doomsday Papers
- Hades Nebula
- Hägar the Horrible
- The Halley Project
- Halls of Montezuma: A Battle History of the U.S. Marine Corps
- Halls of the Things
- Hammerfist
- Hangman's Hazard
- Hard Drivin'
- Hard Hat Mack
- Hardball!
- Hardball! II
- Hareraiser
- Harrier Attack
- Harrier Combat Simulator
- Harvey Headbanger
- Hat Trick
- Hawkeye
- Headache
- Head Over Heels
- Heart of Africa
- Heartland
- Hell Cat Ace
- Hellgate
- Helter Skelter
- Henrietta's Book of Spells
- Henry's House
- Herbert on the Slope
- Herbert's Dummy Run
- Hercules
- Hercules Slayer of the Damned
- Hero of the Golden Talisman (video game)
- HeroQuest
- The Heroes of Karn
- Herobotix
- Hes Games
- High Frequency (video game)
- High Noon
- High Seas
- Highland Games
- Highlander
- Highway Encounter
- Hillsfar
- Hitchhiker's Guide to the Galaxy, The
- Hobbit, The
- Hole In One
- Hollywood Hijinx
- Hollywood or Bust
- Hollywood Squares
- The Honeymooners
- Hook
- Hoppin' Mad
- Horace Goes Skiing
- Hostages
- Hot Pop
- Hot Rod
- Hot Wheels
- HotShot
- Hounded
- House of Usher
- Hover
- Hover Bovver
- How to be a Complete Bastard
- Howard the Duck
- Howard the Duck II
- Hudson Hawk
- Hugo
- The Hulk
- Human Killing Machine
- Hunchback
- Hunchback: The Adventure
- Hunchback at the Olympics
- Hunchback II: Quasimodo's Revenge
- Hungry Horace
- The Hunt for Red October (1987)
- The Hunt for Red October (1990)
- Hunter Patrol
- Hunter's Moon
- Hustler
- Hydra
- Hydrax
- Hypaball
- Hyper Sports
- Hyperspace Warrior
- Hysteria

== I ==
- I. Q.
- I, Ball
- I, Ball 2
- Icarus
- Ice Palace
- Időrégész
- Ikari III
- Ikari Warriors
- Imhotep
- Impact
- Imperator
- Impossamole
- Impossible Mission
- Impossible Mission II
- Impossible Mission III
- In Search of the Most Amazing Thing
- Incredible Shrinking Sphere
- Indiana Jones and the Last Crusade: The Action Game
- Indiana Jones and the Temple of Doom
- Indiana Jones in the Lost Kingdom
- Indoor Sports
- Indy Heat
- Infernal Runner
- Infidel
- Infiltrator
- Infiltrator Part II: The Next Day
- Ingrid's Back
- Injured Engine
- Inside Outing
- Inspector Gadget
- Inspector Gadget and the Circus of Fear
- Instant Music
- The Institute
- International 3D Tennis
- International Basketball (Commodore 64)
- International Karate (World Karate Champ)
- International Karate +
- International Karate + Gold
- International Soccer (1983 computer game) by Commodore
- International Soccer (1988 computer game) by CRL
- Interview (1984 computer game) by Front Runner
- Into the Eagle's Nest
- Intrigue!
- IO
- Iridis Alpha
- It's a Knockout
- It's Only Rock 'n' Roll
- Italy '90 Soccer
- Ivan 'Ironman' Stewart's Super Off Road

== J ==
- Jack Attack
- Jack Nicklaus' Greatest 18 Holes of Major Championship Golf
- Jack the Nipper
- Jack the Nipper II: In Coconut Capers
- Jack the Ripper
- Jackal
- Jail Break
- Jail War
- Jailbreak From Starhold 1
- James Bond 007
- James Pond 2
- Jammin'
- Jason of the Argonauts
- Jawbreaker
- Jaws
- Jeep Command
- Jet
- Jet Set Willy
- Jet Set Willy 2
- Jet-Boot Jack
- Jet-Boys
- The Jetsons
- Jewels of Darkness
- Jigsaw
- Jinxter
- Jocky Wilson's Darts Challenge
- Joe Blade
- Joe Blade 2
- John Elway's Quarterback
- John Madden Football
- Jordan vs. Bird: One on One
- Journey
- Journey to Centre of the Earth
- Jr. Pac-Man
- Judge Dredd (1986)
- Judge Dredd (1991)
- Jumpin' Jack
- Jumpman
- Jumpman Junior
- Jungle Hunt
- Juno First
- Jupiter Lander

== K ==
- Kampfgruppe
- Kane
- Kane 2
- Kangarudy
- Karate Champ
- Karateka
- Karnov
- Katakis
- Kawasaki Magical Musicquill
- Kawasaki Rhythm Rocker
- Kawasaki Synthesizer
- Kennedy Approach
- Kenny Dalglish Soccer Manager
- Kenny Dalglish Soccer Match
- Kentilla
- Kermit's Electronic Storymaker
- Key Quest
- The Keys to Maramon
- Kick Off (1983) by Bubble Bus
- Kick Off (1989) by Anco Software
- Kick Off 2
- Kid Grid
- Kikstart
- Kikstart 2
- Killed Until Dead
- Killerwatt
- Killing Machine
- Kinetik
- King of Chicago
- King's Bounty
- Kings of the Beach
- Klax
- Knight Games
- Knight Games 2
- Knight Orc
- Knight Rider
- Knight Tyme
- Knightmare
- Knights of Legend
- Kokotoni Wilf
- Konami's Ping Pong
- Kong
- Kong Strikes Back!
- Koronis Rift
- Kosmic Kanga
- Krakout
- Kromazone
- Kung-Fu Master
- Kwik Snax

== L ==
- L.A. SWAT
- Labyrinth: The Computer Game
- Lamborghini American Challenge
- Lancelot
- Las Vegas Video Poker
- Laser Chess
- Laser Squad
- Last Battle
- Last Duel
- The Last Ninja
- Last Ninja 2
- Last Ninja 3
- Last Ninja Remix
- The Last V8
- Law of the West
- Lazarian
- Lazy Jones
- Leaderboard
- Leather Goddesses of Phobos
- Led Storm
- Legacy of the Ancients
- The Legend of Blacksilver
- The Legend of Kage
- The Legend of Sinbad
- Legend of the Amazon Women
- Legend of the Knucker-Hole
- Legions of Death
- Le Mans
- Lemmings
- Lethal Weapon
- Leviathan
- The Light Corridor
- Light Force
- Line of Fire
- Lions of the Universe
- Little Computer People
- Live and Let Die
- Liverpool
- The Living Daylights
- Livingstone, I Presume?
- Loco
- Lode Runner
- Lode Runner's Rescue
- London Blitz
- Looney Balloon
- Loopz
- Lord of the Rings: Game One
- Lords of Chaos
- Lords of Conquest
- Lords of Karma
- The Lords of Midnight
- Lords of Time
- Lotus Esprit Turbo Challenge
- The Lost Crown of Queen Anne
- Lucky Luke
- Lunar Leeper
- Lunar Outpost
- Lunar Rescue
- The Lurking Horror

== M ==
- M.A.S.K. III - Venom Strikes Back
- M.C. Kids
- M.U.L.E.
- Macadam Bumper
- Mad Doctor
- Mad Nurse
- The Magic Candle
- Magic Carpet
- Magic Johnson's Basketball
- Magicland Dizzy
- Mail Order Monsters
- Main Frame
- Mama Llama
- Manchester United
- Mancopter
- Mandroid
- Maniac Mansion
- Manic Miner
- Manky
- Marauder
- Marble Madness
- Mario Bros.
- Mars Saga
- The Mask of the Sun
- Master Chess
- Master of Magic
- Master of the Lamps
- Masters of the Universe: The Arcade Game
- Masters of the Universe: The Movie
- Masters of the Universe: The Super Adventure
- MasterType
- Match Day
- Match Day II
- Match Point
- Math Blaster
- Math Busters
- Mayhem in Monsterland
- Maziacs
- McDonaldland
- Mean Streets
- Meanstreak
- Mega Apocalypse
- Menace
- Mercenary: Escape from Targ
- Mercenary: The Second City
- Mercs
- Metal Gear
- Metro-Cross
- Miami Vice
- Michael Jackson's Moonwalker
- Mickey's Space Adventure
- Microball
- Microcosm
- MicroLeague Baseball
- MicroLeague Wrestling
- Microprose Soccer
- Midnight Resistance
- Miecze Valdgira II: Władca Gór
- Mig 29 Soviet Fighter
- Might and Magic Book One: The Secret of the Inner Sanctum
- Might and Magic II: Gates to Another World
- Mighty Bomb Jack
- Mikie
- Milk Race
- Mindfighter
- Mind Mirror
- Mind Prober Jr.
- Mindtrap
- Miner 2049er
- Mini-Putt
- Minnesota Fats Pool Challenge (aka "Hustler")
- Mission A.D.
- Mission Asteroid
- Mission Omega
- Modem Wars
- Moebius: The Orb of Celestial Harmony
- Molecule Man
- Moneybags (1983)
- Monkey Magic (1984)
- Monopoly
- Monster Munch
- Montezuma's Revenge
- Monty Mole
- Monty on the Run
- Moon Cresta
- Moon Patrol
- Moon Shuttle
- Moondust
- Moonmist
- Mothership
- Morpheus
- Motor Mania
- Motos
- Mountain King
- Mountain Palace Adventure
- The Movie Monster Game
- Mr Angry
- Mr. Do!
- Mr. Do's Castle
- Mr. Heli
- Mr. Mephisto
- Mr. Robot and His Robot Factory
- Mr. Wimpy
- Ms. Pac-Man
- Multi-Player Soccer Manager
- The Muncher
- Munchman 64
- Murder on the Mississippi
- Murder on the Zinderneuf
- Mushroom Alley
- Music Composer
- Music Construction Set
- Music Machine
- Musketeer
- Mutant Herd
- Mutant Monty
- Myth
- Myth: History in the Making
- Mystery at Marple Manor

^{D} is a link to the Wikidata page for this game. Games that may not be notable enough for Wikipedia can often be found there.

== See also ==
- List of Commodore 64 games
- List of Commodore 64 games (N–Z)
