= Detective (disambiguation) =

A detective is a professional investigator.

Detective(s) or The Detective(s) may also refer to:

== Films ==
- Detectives (1928 film), an American silent comedy film by MGM, directed by Chester Franklin
- Detective (1954 film), an Argentine film
- The Detective (1954 film) or Father Brown, a British mystery comedy
- Detective (1958 film), Indian film
- The Detective (1968 film), an American film based on the Roderick Thorpe novel (see below)
- Detectives (1969 film), a West German crime film
- Detective (1979 film). a Soviet action film
- Détective, a 1985 French film directed by Jean-Luc Godard
- Detective (2007 film), an Indian Malayalam film
- The Detective (2007 film), a Hong Kong neo-noir mystery thriller
- Detective (2020 film), an Indian Bengali film

== Literature ==
- Detective (novel), a 1997 novel by Arthur Hailey
- The Detective (novel), a 1966 novel by Roderick Thorp

== Television ==
- Detective (TV series) (1964–1969), a BBC TV anthology series that adapted different detectives by different authors
- The Detectives (1959 TV series), an American crime drama TV series starring film star Robert Taylor
- The Detectives (1993 TV series), a British sitcom starring Jasper Carrott and Robert Powell
- The Detectives (2015 TV series), a BBC documentary series filmed in Manchester
- The Detectives (2018 TV series), a CBC true crime series filmed in Canada

== Other uses in arts, entertainment, and media ==
- Detective (band), an American rock band
- The Detective (video game), a 1986 video game
- "Detectives", a song by Moka Only from the 2000 album Road Life

== See also ==
- Detective Story (disambiguation)
- True Detective (disambiguation)
- Criminal Investigation Department
