= Mephisto =

Mephisto or Mephistopheles is one of the chief demons of German literary tradition.

Mephisto or Mephistopheles may also refer to:

== Film and television ==
=== Films ===
- Mephisto, a 1912 British silent film written by Leedham Bantock and directed by Alfred de Manby and F. Martin Thornton
- Méphisto, a 1931 French film
- Mephisto (1981 film), a German-Hungarian film based on Klaus Mann's novel Mephisto

=== Fictional characters ===
- Captain Mephisto, a time-travelling, shapeshifting pirate in the 1945 Republic Pictures movie serial Manhunt of Mystery Island
- Mephisto, a 'doctor' in the anime film Demon City Shinjuku (1988)
- Dark Mephisto and Dark Mephisto (Zwei), two of the villains in Ultraman Nexus (2004–5)
- Dr. Mephesto, a mad scientist in the South Park TV series
- Mephisto, a character on the Australian television series, Double the Fist (2004–2008)
- Mephisto, a character in the anime series Suite PreCure
- Mephisto Pheles, a son of Satan in the manga/anime Blue Exorcist
- Mephisto, a character in the 2019 feature film The Last Faust
- Mephisto, one of the main villains in the French TV series LoliRock (2014–)
- Mephistopheles, an antagonist in the 2007 film Ghost Rider
- Mephistopheles (Xena), a villain in the Xena: Warrior Princess TV series
- Mephisto (Marvel Cinematic Universe), a Marvel demon, featuring in Ironheart

== Gaming ==
=== Fictional characters ===
- Mephisto, a character in Arknights
- Mephisto, a character in the Diablo series
- Mephistopheles (Dungeons & Dragons), a character in Dungeons & Dragons
- Mephistopheles, a character in Limbus Company

=== Other uses in gaming ===
- Mephisto (automaton), a chess-playing pseudo-automaton
- Mephisto (chess computer), a line of chess computers sold by Hegener & Glaser
- Mephisto (crossword), a long-running competition in the Sunday Times, set by various compilers
- Mr. Mephisto, an early video game

== Literature and publications ==
- Mephisto (Marvel Comics), a supervillain demon in the Marvel Comics universe
- Mephisto (novel), by Klaus Mann
- Mefisto, a novel by John Banville
- Mephisto, a Japanese literary magazine which publishes the winner of the Mephisto Prize
- Mephisto or Mephi, a freedom-fighting organization in the 1920 novel We by Yevgeny Zamyatin

== Music ==
=== Songs ===
- "Mephistopheles", a song by Deicide from the 1990 album Deicide
- "Mephisto", a song by Moonspell from the 1996 album Irreligious
- "Mephisto", a song by Klaus Schulze from the 2005 album Moonlake
- "Mephisto", a song by Bushido from the 2018 album Mythos; see Bushido discography
- "Mephisto" (song), 2023, by Queen Bee, served as an ending theme to the anime adaptation of Oshi no Ko

=== Other uses in music ===
- Mefisto (band), a Swedish black metal band
- Mefistofele (1868), an opera by Italian composer Arrigo Boito
- Mephisto, a character in the two-part rock opera by Kamelot, Epica and The Black Halo
- Mephisto Waltzes (1859–1885), waltzes by Franz Liszt

== Vehicles ==
- Mephisto (tank), a First World War German tank preserved in Australia
- Mephistofeles (car), a one-off racing car created by Ernest Eldridge
- VCAC Mephisto, a French anti-tank guided missile carrier

== Other uses ==
- Mephisto (fish), a genus of fish in the family Triacanthodidae
- Mephisto (wrestler), a Mexican wrestler
- Mephisto, musician and songwriter for Demonic Resurrection
- Northern pudú (Pudu mephistophiles), the smallest species of deer in the world
- MEPHISTO (multi-effect penetrator highly sophisticated and target optimised), a warhead of the Taurus KEPD 350 cruise missile

== See also ==
- Mr. Mistoffelees, a black cat in T.S. Eliot's Old Possum's Book of Practical Cats and in the musical Cats
