= Jack the Nipper =

1986 video game

- Developer: Gremlin Graphics
- Publisher: Gremlin Graphics
- Composer: Ben Daglish
- Platforms: ZX Spectrum, Commodore 64, Amstrad CPC, MSX
- Release: 1986
- Genres: Puzzle, platform
- Mode: Single-player

Jack the Nipper is a video game by Gremlin Graphics released in 1986 for ZX Spectrum, Commodore 64, Amstrad CPC, and MSX. It was followed by a sequel, Jack the Nipper II: In Coconut Capers.

== Gameplay ==
Jack the Nipper is a side-view flip screen game with puzzle solving and platform elements. The graphics are rendered in 2D, but an illusion of depth is achieved by allowing characters to move forward and back within the playing area.

The player controls Jack, a naughty child who wants to break the record for naughtiness (recorded on the "naughtyometer"). He needs to carry out various wicked pranks on the unsuspecting inhabitants of his town, but if he comes into contact by angry adults he will be spanked. With each spanking his "nappy rash" meter increases, and if it grows too high Jack loses a life. Contact with the monsters and ghosts which inhabit the town will also increase the nappy rash.

== Reception ==
Reception

Review scores
Publication	Score
Crash	93%
Computer and Video Games	31/40
Sinclair User	5/5
Your Sinclair	9/10
Computer Gamer	15/20
ACE	5/5

Awards
Publication	Award
Crash	Crash Smash!
C+VG	Game of the Month
C+VG	CVG Hit!

The game went to number 1 in the ZX Spectrum charts, replacing Ghosts 'n Goblins, and reached number 2 in the overall charts behind Leader Board.

Sinclair User described it as having a "Wallyish style reminiscent of Pyjamarama, running wild through the village, searching houses, shops and gardens for objects you can use to create havoc elsewhere", in an environment populated by "Beano"-type characters. The review noted how it was "tempting when you come across a well-tended garden and you just happen to have a bottle of weed killer ... And then there's the tin of glue and the false teeth factory..."

ZX Computing praised the graphics. The Spectrum version was voted number 40 in the Your Sinclair Readers' Top 100 Games of All Time.

== Legacy ==
Starting in April 1987, Your Sinclair magazine published a monthly comic strip based on the character.
