= Agent X (comics) =

Agent X, in comics, may refer to:

- Agent X (Marvel Comics), a fictional mercenary whose adventures have been published by Marvel Comics
- Secret Agent X-9, a comic strip begun by writer Dashiell Hammett and artist Alex Raymond

== See also ==
- Agent X (disambiguation)
