= Agent X =

Agent X may refer to:

- Agent X (Chuck), the codename for the character Alexei Volkoff (Timothy Dalton) on the TV series Chuck
- Agent X (Marvel Comics), a fictional mercenary whose adventures have been published by Marvel Comics
- Agent X (1986 video game), a 1986 video game released by Mastertronic
  - Agent X II: The Mad Prof's Back, a 1987 sequel to this game
- Agent X (TV series), a U.S. TV series for TNT starring Sharon Stone

== See also ==
- Secret Agent X, a U.S. pulp magazine published by A. A. Wyn, and the name of the main character featured in the magazine
- Secret Agent X-9, a comic strip begun by writer Dashiell Hammett and artist Alex Raymond
  - Secret Agent X-9 (1937 serial), a 1937 Universal movie serial based on this comic strip
  - Secret Agent X-9 (1945 serial), a 1945 Universal movie serial based on this comic strip
