= Back to the Future (1985 video game) =

- Commodore 64 cover art image
- Developers: Software Images (Mark Eyles, Martin Walker, Herv Jones, Mike Saxby)
- Publisher: Electric Dreams Software
- Series: Back to the Future
- Platforms: Amstrad CPC, Commodore 64, ZX Spectrum
- Release: Commodore 64: NA: 1985; EU: 1986; Amstrad CPC: EU: 1985; ZX Spectrum: EU: 1985
- Genre: Adventure
- Mode: Single-player

Back to the Future is a 1985 video game released by Electric Dreams Software for the ZX Spectrum, Commodore 64 and Amstrad CPC. The game is loosely based on the 1985 film of the same name.

== Gameplay ==
The game is a side view arcade adventure. The aim of the game is to get George McFly to spend as much time as possible with Lorraine Baines. The more time George and Lorraine spend together, the more they will fall in love, and thus more segments will be added to the family photograph in the bottom right corner. The photograph in the bottom right and left of the screen gradually disappear if the player does nothing, thus setting a time limit on the game.

The player can find various object to help him such as love poems, a cup of coffee, alien suit and a guitar. He also has a skateboard to move around quickly.

== Reception ==
Reception

Review scores
Publication	Score
Crash	40%
Sinclair User	4/10
Your Sinclair	4/10
MicroHobby (ES)	6/10

Max Phillips, reviewer for YS magazine, summarised the game as "not a bad conversion of the plot. Nice to see an original game concept. It may even be very clever. But I can't say it's very much fun to play". ZX Computing magazine said it was "overpriced and over-hyped", and Computer Gamer added, "buy this at your peril".

Mark Eyles, one of the developers, commented:

Back to the Future was a bit of a rush. We knocked it out in about two months flat. We really wanted about twice as long to do the film justice, but the deadline was pressing...

=== Rerelease ===
Virgin included the game in their 1987 compilation Now Games 4, along with Dan Dare: Pilot of the Future, Mission Omega, Hacker and Jonah Barrington Squash.

The game was also included in The Story So Far Volume IV compilation in 1989, along with Wonder Boy, Quartet, Aliens, The Eidolon and Ghostbusters. On this occasion, the game achieved the lowest score on the compilation from YS magazine, who concluded that it was "a total waste of tape".
