= Cloud Kingdom =

Cloud Kingdom(s) may refer to:

- Cloud Kingdom, fictional kingdom in the Adventure Time television franchise
- Cloud Kingdom, fictional kingdom in the Barbie and the Magic of Pegasus film
- Cloud Kingdom, fictional kingdom in the Super Mario Odyssey video game
- Cloud Kingdoms, fictional kingdom in the Jack and the Beanstalk literature
- Cloud Kingdoms, puzzle game

== See also ==
- List of fictional countries
- Doraemon: Nobita and the Kingdom of Clouds, 1992 Doraemon film
- Kingdom in the Clouds, 1969 Romanian fantasy film
