= Never Mind (video game) =

1989 video game

- Developer: MC Lothlorien
- Publisher: Psyclapse
- Platforms: Amiga, Atari ST, MS-DOS
- Release: 1989
- Genre: Puzzle
- Mode: Single-player

Never Mind (also known as Nevermind) is a puzzle video game developed by MC Lothlorien and published by Psygnosis under its Psyclapse label in 1989 for Amiga, Atari ST, and MS-DOS.

== Gameplay ==
The game is played in a 3D isometric environment. Each isometric square represents a tile. At the beginning of each level, a picture made up of sixteen tiles will be displayed to the player. The computer will then rearrange the tiles which make up the picture, and distribute some in other areas of the level. The player's task is to restore the picture to the way it looked at the beginning of the level. This is achieved by walking around the isometric world, picking up tiles, and placing them in the correct place. Throughout a level, warps must be found which allow the player to change from walking on the floor to walking on the walls. Each level has a time limit. If the time runs out, the player loses. When the picture is complete, the player progresses to the next level.

From level two onwards, chess pieces patrol the level. The chess pieces may move correctly placed tiles to somewhere else on the level, or block the player's path. In addition, later levels contain several pictures, and several screens.

== Reception ==
Reception

Review scores
Publication	Score
ACE	87% (Amiga), 86% (PC)
Amiga Computing	53%
Amiga User International	57%
The Games Machine	76% (Amiga), 75% (PC)
