= Rescue (1987 video game) =

- Developer: Icon Design
- Publisher: Mastertronic
- Platform: ZX Spectrum
- Release: EU: 1987
- Genre: Shooter
- Mode: Single-player

Rescue is a shooter video game published by Mastertronic in 1987 for the ZX Spectrum. It was written by Ste Cork with music by Tiny Williams and graphics by Mark O'Neill.

== Gameplay ==
The purpose of the game is to rescue the correct scientist and the "ultimate experiment". The player must then guide the scientists back to their spacecraft and refuel it before escaping.

The game generates the same maze layout each time it is played, but it randomises which scientist and which secret experiment (represented by a red test tube) is the correct one.

Enemies are spawned randomly and go around destroying the scientists, experiments, fuel and ammo caches, sometimes making it to player's spaceship and destroying items the players had already recovered.

== Reception ==
In a 1987 review, Your Sinclair described the game as "nice graphics, easy to play but impossible to complete!" and awarded it 7 out of 10.

Rescue was placed at number 44 in the Your Sinclair Official Top 100, compiled by videogame journalist Stuart Campbell in the early 1990s.
