= MicroRhythm =

MicroRhythm along with MicroDisco, MicroLatin, MicroVocals and MicroTuned was part of a set of music creation software (then advertised as games) developed by Simon Pick (developer of Daredevil Dennis and Rod Land on NES) for Commodore 64/128. MicroRhythm used real sampled sounds and was essentially a drum machine that had the same layout as other micro-versions. It was published by Firebird in 1986. and was priced £1.99.

All micro- versions had three modes: "Bars" mode was used to create individual patterns and "song" mode to align patterns in desired order to create a tune (exactly as pattern-based music sequencers do). There was also a third real-time mode for playing with the keyboard. Simple flam effect and pitch adjust for every sample were also possible, as well as the main tempo change.

Each micro version had unique sets of sounds, thus producing different genres of tunes. It was possible to save projects to cassette tape via C64 cassette recorder or disk drive, and load them later in program for additional editing or even analog output mixing. In 1988 and 1989 András Szigethy converted original versions for Plus/4. Converted .prg versions that can be used with emulators (such as VICE) are available for download in the link below.
