= Panther (1986 video game) =

1986 video game

- Developer: Sculptured Software (Atari)
- Publisher: Mastertronic
- Designer: Peter Adams
- Programmer: Chuck Peavey (Atari)
- Composer: David Whittaker
- Platforms: Commodore 64, ZX Spectrum, Atari 8-bit
- Release: 1986: C64; 1987: Atari; 1989: Spectrum
- Genre: Scrolling shooter

Panther is a Commodore 64 game designed and implemented by Peter Adams and published by Mastertronic in 1986. A version for Atari 8-bit computers followed in 1987, then a ZX Spectrum port in 1989. The player pilots a strange-looking aircraft, fighting off hordes of invading flying saucers and rescuing people by landing the craft and waiting for them to board. The game uses a diagonally scrolling isometric view, much like Zaxxon and Blue Max, using shadows to show the height of flying objects. Adams previously worked on ports of both of those games.

The Commodore 64 disk packaged Panther with L.A. SWAT, another Mastertronic game. The A-side of the disk contained the two programs for the C64/128, and the B-side contained Atari 8-bit computer versions.

== Gameplay ==
Atari 8-bit screenshot

In Panther, the player must pilot their craft across the landscape, shoot up the invaders and rescue survivors. To do this, the player must land close to the bunkers when they appear on the screen and stay there until all the refugees reach the ship. At the end of each run, a capsule awaits to take refugees to safety. The aliens attack in waves, and the player's onboard computer indicates at the bottom of the screen the position of incoming units relative to the ship, as well as the number of shields remaining. The goal of the game is to achieve a high score by rescuing as many people as possible.

== Reception ==
Panther received mostly positive reviews. Ruth James writing for Atari User enjoyed the game despite minor faults and concluded: "You must buy this game for your collection, it's well worth it". Zzap!64 review was also positive, with reviewers stating that the game provides several hours of entertainment as the player tries to collect and deliver all the survivors. Commodore User review was similar in tone and gave the game an overall rating of 7/10.
