= MC Lothlorien =

UK video games developer, 1982–1989

- Industry: Software
- Founded: 1982
- Headquarters: United Kingdom
- Key people: Roger Lees; Mike Cohen; Geoff Street
- Products: ZX Spectrum; Dragon 32; BBC Micro
- Services: Video game developer and publisher

MC Lothlorien was a video games developer and publisher based in United Kingdom. The company was founded in 1982 and initially specialised in developing software for the ZX Spectrum, Dragon 32 and BBC Micro computer platforms on its own Lothlorien publishing label.

The company was associated in its early days with computer wargaming, with Johnny Reb and Redweed being two early games of that genre produced for the ZX Spectrum.

In 1985 the company entered an agreement with Argus Press Software to improve the marketing and distribution of its titles. In later years, the company developed titles for other publishers, using the name MC Lothlorien and Icon Design, which was formed in 1986 following their acquisition of A'n'F Software, publishers of Chuckie Egg. Without the expertise to move into the emerging 16-bit market the company was closed in 1989.

== Partial softography ==
=== Published by Lothlorien ===
- Tyrant of Athens (1982)
- Warlord (1982)
- Johnny Reb (1983)
- Micro Mouse Goes Debugging (1983)
- Beetlemania (1983)
- Bedlam Blaster (1983)
- Redweed (1983)
- Billy Bong (1984)
- Two Gun Turtle (1984)
- Special Operations (1984)
- Arena (1985) (ZX, CPC)
- Redcoats (1985)
- Overlords (1985)
- Waterloo (1985)
- Austerlitz (1985)

=== Published by Argus Press ===
- The Bulge (1985)
- Arena (1985)
- Johnny Reb II (1986)
- Legions of Death (1987)

=== Developed by Icon Design ===
- Peter Shilton's Handball Maradona (Argus Press, 1986)
- Ninja (Mastertronic, 1986)
- Agent Orange (Argus Press, 1987)
- Colony (Mastertronic/Bulldog, 1987)
- Rescue (Mastertronic, 1987)
- Kikstart 2 (Mastertronic, 1987)
- Rastan (Ocean/Imagine, 1988)
- Xenon (Melbourne House, 1989)
- Terrorpods (Psygnosis, 1988)
- Barbarian (Psygnosis, 1988)
- Obliterator (Psygnosis, 1989)

=== Developed by MC Lothlorien ===
- Barbarian II: The Dungeon of Drax (Palace Software, 1988)
- Chuckie Egg 2 (Pick & Choose, 1989)
- Never Mind (Psyclapse, 1989)
