= Micro Mouse Goes Debugging =

1983 video game

- Developer: Steve Hughes
- Publisher: MC Lothlorien
- Platforms: ZX Spectrum 16K, 48K Commodore 64
- Release: 1983
- Mode: Single-player

Micro Mouse Goes Debugging is a computer game for the ZX Spectrum. It was released by MC Lothlorien in 1983.

== Gameplay ==
The premise of the game is to control Micro Mouse around a screen which contains lines of BASIC program, some of which is missing. While Micro Mouse is replacing the code, he must avoid bugs which will try to kill the player and also pinch part of the code. Micro Mouse's only form of defense is a can of data kill.

== Legacy ==
MC Lothlorien produced another game of the same name in 1989 which was released by Mastertronic. It was also released for the Amstrad CPC and the Commodore 64. This has completely different gameplay compared to the original. In this version, the players guide Micro Mouse around a circuit board picking up parts and placing them in the correct spot. This version was poorly received by critics.
