= List of Gatchaman video games =

This is a list of video games based on the anime series Science Ninja Team Gatchaman.

== Battle of the Planets ==
Battle of the Planets
- Developer: Mikro-Gen Ltd
- Publisher: Mikro-Gen Ltd
- Platforms: Amstrad CPC, Commodore 64, ZX Spectrum
- Release: 1986
- Genre: Action
- Mode: Single-player

Battle of the Planets is a video game based on a television series of the same name. The game was published in 1986 by Mikro-Gen Ltd for various home computer systems, including the Amstrad CPC, Commodore 64 and ZX Spectrum.

== Kagaku Ninjatai Gatchaman ==
Kagaku Ninjatai Gatchaman
- Developer: Family Soft
- Publisher: Family Soft
- Platform: PC-98
- Release: 1994
- Genre: Strategy

Kagaku Ninjatai Gatchaman is a strategy video game produced by Family Soft.

== Gatchaman: The Shooting ==
Gatchaman: The Shooting
- Publisher: Bandai
- Platform: PlayStation
- Release: NTSC-J: June 27, 2002
- Genre: Action
- Mode: Single-player

Gatchaman: The Shooting is an action game based on the Gatchaman television series.

== Pachi-Slot Gatchaman ==
Pachi-Slot Gatchaman
- Publisher: Banpresto
- Platform: PlayStation 2
- Release: JP: February 22, 2007
- Genre: Action
- Mode: Single-player

Pachi-Slot Gatchaman is a video game of the television series of the same name. The game was only released in Japan.

== Also appeared in ==
- Tatsunoko Fight (PlayStation, released by Takara in 2000)
- Tatsunoko vs. Capcom: Cross Generation of Heroes (Arcade and Wii, released by Capcom in 2008)
- Tatsunoko vs. Capcom: Ultimate All-Stars (Wii, released by Capcom in 2010)
