= Elidon =

1985 video game

- Cover art by Colin Marshall
- Developer(s): Orpheus
- Publisher(s): Orpheus; Aackosoft (Denmark)
- Designer(s): John B. Marshall; Paul B. Kaufman
- Programmer(s): Andrew Green
- Artist(s): John B. Marshall
- Composer(s): Jon Maskill
- Platform(s): Amstrad CPC, Commodore 64, MSX
- Release: 1985
- Genre(s): Action
- Mode(s): Single-player

Elidon is a 1985 action game developed and published by Orpheus for the Amstrad CPC, Commodore 64, and MSX computers.

== Gameplay ==
Elidon is a flip-screen (or flick-screen) platform game. The player controls a flying Faerie using the keyboard or joystick. When the Faerie reaches the edge of the current screen, it will 'flip' to the next screen, a common technique in 1980s home computers.

The player must avoid the nasties and obstacles which drain the Faerie's energy. A wand can be used to remove the nasties. The Faerie can only hold three collectables at a time.

== Reception ==
Elidon was well received by press, including review scores of 78% from Amtix, 15/20 from Computer Gamer, 85% from CVG Magazine and 83% from Zzap!64.
