= Detective Story =

Detective Story can refer to the following things:

- Detective fiction, a genre of fiction
- Detective Story (play), a 1949 play by Sidney Kingsley
  - Detective Story (1951 film), a film version of the play
- Tantei Monogatari (Detective Story), a Japanese TV series broadcast 1979 to 1980
- Detective Story (1983 film), a Japanese film directed by Kichitaro Negishi
- Detective Story (2007 film), a Japanese film directed by Takashi Miike
- Detective Story Magazine, a magazine of detective fiction that ran from 1915 to 1949
- A Detective Story, a short film from the 2003 short-film compilation The Animatrix
- Detective Stories, a comic series in the Rivers of London universe
