= Jack the Nipper II: In Coconut Capers =

1987 video game

- Developer: Gremlin Graphics
- Publisher: Gremlin Graphics
- Platforms: ZX Spectrum, Commodore 64, Amstrad CPC, MSX
- Release: 1987
- Genre: Puzzle-platform
- Mode: Single-player

Jack the Nipper II: In Coconut Capers is a video game by Gremlin Graphics released in 1987 for ZX Spectrum, Commodore 64, Amstrad CPC, and MSX. It is the sequel to Jack the Nipper. As with the previous game, Jack the Nipper II is a side-view platform game with puzzle solving elements. The Commodore 64 version uses full-screen smooth scrolling, while the other versions employ a flip screen technique. The false-3D effect from the original has been removed, making the gameplay pure 2D.

== Plot ==
Following his naughty exploits in Jack the Nipper, Jack and his family have been exiled to Australia. Unhappy with this, Jack has jumped from the plane, using his nappy as a parachute. He finds himself in the middle of the African jungle, surrounded by dangerous animals and natives. His father is also following close behind, determined to give his boy a good spanking. Jack must cause as much mischief as possible while avoiding punishment.

== Gameplay ==
Jack must again perform naughty pranks—this time on the human and animal inhabitants of the jungle—while evading his father who is in hot pursuit.

== Reception ==
Reception

Review scores
Publication	Score
Crash	87%
Computer and Video Games	35/40
Sinclair User	7/10
Your Sinclair	9/10
The Games Machine	84%
ACE	709

Award
Publication	Award
C+VG	CVG Hit!

- Your Sinclair:
  "... another little spanker from Gremlin. As always with that company, the graphics are immaculate - colourful and with clash down to a minimum... And the jokes - well, hilarious, as always. Leave Jack for a moment and he'll start raking around in his nostril - bleugghhh! Quite what he does with the contents is never made clear..."
- Sinclair User:
  "The music, Henry Mancini's March of the Baby Elephants, is cleverly done, but not so cleverly that you don't want to use the OFF option after a few minutes. As with most games of this type, my main complaint is that it's much too complicated to solve at one sitting, and there's no SAVE option. Just Gremlin Graphics being naughty, I suppose".

The game was reviewed in 1990 in Dragon #158 by Hartley, Patricia, and Kirk Lesser in "The Role of Computers" column, as part of the Mastertronic MEGA Pack of 10 games previously released in Europe. The reviewers gave the game 3½ out of 5 stars, calling it "a rather cute arcade game that has the on-screen character running around in Africa".
