= Three Weeks in Paradise =

1986 video game

- Developers: Chris Hinsley; David Perry; Nicholas Jones
- Publisher: Mikro-Gen
- Series: Wally Week
- Platforms: Amstrad CPC, ZX Spectrum
- Release: PAL: 1986
- Genre: Platform
- Mode: Single-player

Three Weeks in Paradise is a video game released in 1986 by Mikro-Gen for the ZX Spectrum and Amstrad CPC platforms. It is the last action-adventure platform in the Wally Week series.

== Gameplay ==
The Week family are lost on a tropical island inhabited by a hostile local tribe - the "Can Nibbles". Herbert and Wilma (Wally's son and wife) have been captured and Wally must rescue them and build a raft to escape.

The player controls Wally and must solve puzzles and avoid obstacles such as animals and natives - especially the tribal chief, who is patrolling the area. Each puzzle solved builds a piece of escape raft. As with previous Wally games humour plays an important part in both the gameplay and puzzle solving.

The graphics were detailed and the Spectrum version had an option to switch off Wally's natural colour, which would remove the colour clash. The ZX Spectrum +128 version included enhanced sound and additional underwater screens with objects to use, but the rest of the game - including the solution - remains the same.

== Development ==
Three Weeks was originally intended to be a Mikro-Plus product, but the failure of that peripheral meant that it was released as a standard software title instead.

== Reception ==
Reception

Review scores
Publication	Score
Amstrad Action	67%
Amtix	91%
Crash	93%
Computer and Video Games	35/40
Sinclair User	5/5
Your Sinclair	9/10

Awards
Publication	Award
Crash	Crash Smash
Sinclair User	SU Classic
Your Sinclair	Megagame

Three Weeks in Paradise received positive reception from critics. The ZX Spectrum version was voted number 76 in the Your Sinclair Official Top 100 Games of All Time.
