= Los Angeles SWAT =

1986 video game

- Developer: Sculptured Software
- Publisher: Mastertronic
- Platforms: Amstrad CPC, Commodore 64, Atari 8-bit, ZX Spectrum
- Release: 1986: C64, Atari; 1986: Spectrum
- Genre: Shooter
- Mode: Single-player

Los Angeles SWAT (also known as L.A. SWAT) is a 1986 video game released by Mastertronic for the Amstrad CPC, Atari 8-bit computers, Commodore 64, and ZX Spectrum. In this game, the player assumes the role of a Los Angeles police officer fighting rioters. The Commodore 64 and Atari 8-bit versions share a disk with Panther, another Mastertronic game. The one side of the disk contains the two programs for the C64, while the other has Atari 8-bit versions.

== Gameplay ==
In each level, the player moves toward the top of the screen avoiding or shooting the rioters, who would either lob grenades, if at a distance, or beat player's character to the pavement with clubs if in melee range.

At the end of each level, a procession of gang members (usually with a single shirt color, marching in formation) streams down from the top of the screen. After killing all of these gang members, a single gang member, the boss, moves randomly around the screen with a woman next to him. Shooting the woman causes the player to lose points, while successfully shooting only the gang member causes her to "take the arm" of player's character.

As the levels progress, the gang members become more frequent and the player begins to see cars placed perpendicular to the street, acting as roadblocks.

== Reception ==
Zzap!64 found the game to be in dubious taste yet undoubtedly enjoyable to play, despite the poor graphics and sound. It was given an overall rating of 74%.
