= Equinox (1986 video game) =

- Publisher: Mikro-Gen
- Platforms: ZX Spectrum, Commodore 64, Amstrad CPC
- Release: 1986
- Genre: Action
- Mode: Single-player

Equinox is an action video game released by Mikro-Gen in 1986 for the ZX Spectrum, Amstrad CPC, and Commodore 64.

== Gameplay ==
Equinox gameplay. The player is the yellow sphere on the right hand side, the purple, blue, white and green sprites are mobile enemies. A number "1" access key can be collected on the left of the screen.

The player controls a Dedicated Disposal Droid that must harvest the planet Sury Ani 7. A security system of defence droids attempts to prevent this. To progress, the player must turn off the security system and clear the area of radioactive material. There are 8 levels, each with a time-limit restriction.

== Development ==
Equinox was programmed by Raffaele Cecco and Chris Hinsley. It was showcased at the 1986 Consumer Electronics Show.

== Reception ==
Reception

Review scores
Publication	Score
Amstrad Action	83%
Amtix	91%
Crash	87%
Sinclair User	5/5
Your Sinclair	8/10
Zzap!64	83%

Equinox received generally positive reviews from video game critics.
