= Hes Games =

1984 video game

- Cover art
- Developer: 321 Software
- Publisher: HESware
- Platform: Commodore 64
- Release: NA: 1984; EU: 1984
- Genre: Sports
- Mode: Single-player

Hes Games is a 1984 sports game released for the Commodore 64 by HESware.

It was originally developed by 3-2-1 Software for the C64 . It was later upgraded by Michael Crick and released in the UK by Americana as Go For The Gold (#1 hit September 1986) and in the US by COSMI CORP under the label Celery Software. The US title, World Games, was changed to Gold Medal Games to avoid confusion with an Epyx product also called World Games.

== Reception ==
InfoWorld in 1984 stated that HES Games "may be one of the best" of several Olympics-related games, especially praising the weightlifting simulation. The game was positively reviewed by Zzap!64 magazine who gave it a 95% rating.
