= Pyjamarama =

1984 video game

- Developer: Chris Hinsley
- Publisher: Mikro-Gen
- Platforms: ZX Spectrum, Commodore 64, Amstrad CPC
- Release: 1984
- Genre: Action-adventure
- Mode: Single-player

Pyjamarama is a video game for the ZX Spectrum, Amstrad CPC, and the Commodore 64. It features Wally Week as the central character and is the second (after Automania) of a series of games featuring Wally and/or members of his family. It was published by Mikro-Gen (through Amsoft for the Amstrad version). Starting in July 1986, Your Sinclair magazine published a monthly comic strip based on the character.

There are two different versions of the game. The original plays the song "Popcorn", the second release plays an original tune.

Four other Wally Week games were released: Automania, Everyone's A Wally, Herbert's Dummy Run, and Three Weeks in Paradise.

== Gameplay ==
Pyjamarama is an action-adventure game set across several interconnecting rooms. The player takes the role of Wally, who has gone to bed for the night and has to wake up early in the morning for work. Unfortunately, his alarm clock has not been wound, and thus he will sleep late in the morning, and his boss will fire him. However, in his sleep, Wally's consciousness travels around his home, and other places, wearing his pyjamas, in search for the key to rewind the alarm clock and wake himself up.

Pyjamarama on the ZX Spectrum. Wally is asleep in bed on the left of the screen, his dream-self is smaller on the far right.

Commodore 64 screenshot

The game is made up of static single-screen rooms, each of which can include platforms in various arrangements, objects to pick up, and enemies to avoid. Wally can walk through the screens to progress through the game's map and to pick up objects. Wally can carry two items in a first in, first out arrangement. Contact with an enemy drains Wally's "snooze energy", and if it runs out, Wally loses one of his lives. Snooze energy can be regained by drinking milk, which appears at various locations in the game. When all lives are lost, Wally returns to sleep and does not wake up until late in the morning, losing the game.

One of the rooms in the game is a video games room, in which Wally can play a version of Space Invaders against various sprites from other parts of the game. If all the rounds are completed, Wally is rewarded with an extra life.

Pyjamarama can be played either with a joystick or with the keyboard. There are three controls: walk left, walk right, and jump.

== Reception ==
The ZX Spectrum version of Pyjamarama received the Game of the Month award in the November 1984 issue of Personal Computer Games, beating the BBC Micro version of Elite to the title.
