= Cloud Kingdoms =

1990 video game

- Atari ST box art
- Developer: Logotron
- Publisher: Millennium Interactive
- Designer: Dene Carter
- Composer: David Whittaker
- Platforms: Atari ST, Amiga, Commodore 64, MS-DOS
- Release: 1990
- Genre: Puzzle
- Mode: Single-player

Cloud Kingdoms is a puzzle game published by Millennium Interactive for the Amiga, Atari ST, Commodore 64, and MS-DOS in 1990. The player controls Terry, a green bouncing sphere, on a quest to recover his magic crystals that have been stolen by Baron von Bonsai. To do so, he must travel through the eponymous Cloud Kingdoms, avoiding enemies and hazards while collecting all of the crystals within the game's time limit. The game was developed by Dene Carter at Logotron, with sounds and music composed by David Whittaker.

Most editions were priced at £24.99 upon their release, except for the Commodore 64 ports, which were less expensive. Reception for the Amiga version was generally positive, but was more mixed for the Commodore 64 port. Most reviews, however, praised the graphics and gameplay and criticized the difficulty and the amount of content that was available for the price. A less expensive re-release for Amiga computers a year later, at £7.99, also received mixed reviews.

== Gameplay ==
Commodore 64 gameplay

Cloud Kingdoms is a puzzle game where the player controls the character of Terry, a green bouncing sphere with eyes, in his quest to recover his magic crystals that were stolen by the game's antagonist, Baron von Bonsai. The crystals have been scattered across a series of levels, the eponymous Cloud Kingdoms, which Terry must conquer in order to win the game. The player navigates Terry through each Kingdom from a top-down perspective and can move in eight directions, as well as jump over enemies, obstacles, and holes. Enemies include fairies that have been transformed into insects and black balls by Baron von Bonsai. There are 15 Kingdoms in the Commodore 64 version and 32 in all others.

Players begin the game with a preset choice of four Kingdoms to begin with, with each leading to four other kingdoms that are opened up once the level is won. The objective in each Kingdom is to collect all of the crystals and maneuver through hazards such as trap doors, slippery floors, magnet floors that prevent Terry from jumping, and pinball bumpers. The game overall has a time limit of 99 "Manukas", each of which is equivalent to approximately four seconds. Contact with lava fields or enemies drains the player's energy and, if all energy is lost, the level is reset and ten Manukas are subtracted from the remaining total. The level can also be restarted voluntarily, at the cost of five Manukas. When the Manuka counter reaches zero, the game ends. Collecting clocks will add five Manukas to the timer, while successfully completing a Kingdom will add twenty. Energy can be restored by collecting soda bottles, while shields will make Terry invincible to enemies for a short period. Other items include wings, which allow Terry to fly over all obstacles, paint cans, which allow him to fill in holes and trap doors, and alcohol bottles that temporarily make the gameplay more difficult by altering some of the mechanics.

== Development and release ==
Cloud Kingdoms was developed at Logotron by Dene Carter, who had previously worked on Druid and its sequel Enlightenment for the Commodore 64, as well as Dragon Lord. It was published under Logotron's publishing arm Millennium Interactive Ltd. The game contains a small assortment of sound effects, as well as music on the title screen, and tunes that play when particular items are collected, all composed by David Whittaker. Upon its release in 1990, Cloud Kingdoms was priced at £24.99 for the Amiga, Atari ST, and MS-DOS versions, and £9.99 and £14.99 for a Commodore 64 cassette and disk respectively. In addition to having fewer levels, the Commodore 64 version also omitted several styles of the enemies. The MS-DOS edition came out a week after the others and supported EGA and VGA graphics. It also featured fewer sounds than the other versions.

== Reception ==
Reviews for Cloud Kingdom on Amiga computers were positive. Writing for Computer and Video Games, Paul Rand praised the graphics and gameplay over similar games such as Quedex, and enjoyed its "stimulating and addictive" challenge, rating it at 80%, while Australian Commodore and Amiga Review offered a higher estimation of 83%, with praise overall for the game. ACE magazine gave the Amiga version a score of 730 out of 1000, claiming that it was "taxing enough to provide a good few hours of solid entertainment", while Amiga Action gave it a similar overall score of 72%. Carsten Borgmeier of the German publication Amiga Joker gave the game 71%, docking points primarily for the game's high level of difficulty, while Kati Hamza's 78% for The One was based on concerns that the price might be too high for the amount of content offered. Mark Caswell of The Games Machine held Cloud Kingdoms in high esteem, praising the sound, graphics, and gameplay with an overall 86% rating. Conversely, finding the game average all-around, Magnus Friskytt of the Swedish Datormagazin scored it 5 out of 10.

Similarly mixed reviews were produced for the Commodore 64 version. On the high end, The Games Machine's Mark Caswell again lauded the game, scoring it at 89% and commenting that it was even more playable than the Amiga edition. Stewart C. Russell, writing for Amiga Computing, held the game in lower esteem with a 78% rating, subtracting points for the graphics in particular. Zzap!64 gave the port a rating of 80%, calling it "a well presented and addictive arcade-puzzle game" and feeling that the gameplay was somewhat easier than the Amiga version, which it gave a lower score of 72% for its difficulty and price. Paul Rand of Computer and Video Games also scored the Commodore 64 version at 80%, claiming that it was just as good as the Amiga version despite the reduced number of levels. He gave the same rating to the Atari ST version, noting that the only differences were "cosmetic", an assessment that Katai Hamza agreed with for his Atari ST review in The One. Hamza also looked at the MS-DOS version and claimed that the reduced graphics and sound "in no way serve[] to detriment the proceedings". Datormagazin's Pontus Linberg, on the other hand, gave the Commodore 64 version 5 out of 10, the same as the magazine would give the Amiga version in its following issue. Anatol Locker of the German Power Play magazine felt that the Atari ST version was too easy and, despite its impressive graphics, borrowed too heavily from games such as Quedex, Puffy's Saga, and Rock 'n' Roll. His final verdict was 43%.

Cloud Kingdoms was re-released for Amiga computers in mid-1991 by GBH at the budget price of £7.99. The One for Amiga Games, which had rated the game 78% upon its initial release, lowered its score for the re-release to 3 out of 5, but still admitted that it was "eminently playable and will keep you amused long enough to easily justify the price tag". The Amiga Format review was more negative, giving the game 56% after praising its aesthetic appeal but noting that its "strangely remote joystick response [...] makes a tough design harder to play than it really should be".
