= Kane (video game) =

1986 action video game

- Developer: John Darnell
- Publisher: Mastertronic
- Platforms: Commodore 64, Acorn Electron, Amstrad CPC, BBC Micro, Commodore 16, Plus/4, ZX Spectrum
- Release: 1986
- Genre: Action
- Mode: Single-player

Kane is a multi-section action game published by Mastertronic for the Commodore 64 in 1986. It was ported to the Acorn Electron, Amstrad CPC, BBC Micro, ZX Spectrum, Commodore 16, and Plus/4. The game is set in the Wild West, and its name is a reference to the main character of the film High Noon. It consists of four distinct scenes, although some versions only contain two. A sequel was released in 1988.

== Gameplay ==
The player takes the role of sheriff of the town of Kane. The game is split into four levels, two of which are shooting games using an on-screen target and two of which are side-scrolling action sequences on horseback. Only the shooting levels are present in all versions of the game. These may be played separately in the practice mode (with only one try given), but in order to complete and win the game, they must be played successively. The progress in the first scene defines the tries given in the next scenes.

Scene 1 on the Commodore 64

Scene 4 on the ZX Spectrum

Scene 1: The player controls a target and must shoot birds with a bow and arrow in order to trade with the Indians. The birds appear at varying altitude from the left and fly horizontally to the right. At higher difficulty levels the speed also varies. The player starts with ten arrows. As the arrows take time to reach the target and the birds are moving, the player must anticipate the position the birds will be when the arrow reaches them. If the shot is successful, the arrow returns to the quiver, but arrows that miss are lost. It is possible to take down more than one bird with a single shot if the falling bird hits another as it plummets. The player can kill no more than forty birds or no more than forty birds can be let away (a tally of each is kept on screen). After the limit is reached or the quiver is empty, the player proceeds to the next scene, provided he has killed enough birds to trade for at least one 'peace token'. The number of birds required for a token depends on the difficulty level, beginning with three. The tokens earned in this scene act as the lives for the following scenes.

Scene 2: The player is on horseback and must ride to the town of Kane in a set time limit. The player must canter left to right or gallop to overcome wide obstacles. There are a number of obstacles (bushes, rocks, etc.) that the player must avoid by jumping over. The peace tokens are spent if the horse collides with an obstacle, and if the last token is spent, the rider gives up and it is game over.

Scene 3: When the player reaches the town, he is ambushed by outlaws. The player controls the aim of a revolver, but unlike the first scene, the character on screen also moves left and right with the aim movement. The outlaws appear from cover at varying positions in the town and shoot at the player. The player must shoot ten outlaws, avoiding being shot himself. At higher difficulty levels, the bandits are quicker and more accurate. The players' revolver has six bullets. At any time the player can move to the rightmost position to reload the weapon, but he is still vulnerable when reloading. The peace tokens are spent if the player is shot.

Scene 4: The player is on horseback again and must catch a moving train, this time moving from right to left. The train is travelling at the horse's canter speed, so the player must gallop faster than the train to reach the steam-engine and stop the train. As in scene 2, the horse must jump obstacles. These are more diverse and complicated and require a perfect knowledge of their order. At higher levels the player starts further from the engine and has to gallop longer. The peace tokens are spent if the horse collides with an obstacle.

After successfully completing the scenes, the game then repeats with greater difficulty.

== Release ==
The game was first released on the Commodore 64 in early 1986. It was then ported to Amstrad CPC and ZX Spectrum, featuring all four scenes, and Acorn Electron, BBC Micro, and Commodore 16 & Plus/4 with only the shooting scenes included (scenes 1 and 3 in the original game). Despite this, the BBC/Electron inlay gives instructions for all four scenes. This was corrected on the C16/Plus 4 inlay. All releases were in Mastertronic's £1.99 range.

== Reception ==
Reviews for the game were mixed, possibly reflecting the relative quality of the different versions of the game. The original version on the C64 was given a generally positive review in Zzap!64 with particular praise being given to the sampled sound effects and animation of the main sprites (although they alleged that the main character is stolen from Impossible Mission). The music comes in for criticism with the backgrounds and short nature of the game also being questioned but the game is recommended as "worth every penny of the measly two quid asking price" with an overall score of 63%. In direct contrast, their review of the C16 version in the Zzap!C16 supplement, the background graphics are praised but they claim "the movement of the main sprite leaves a little to be desired" giving an overall score of 48%. The Amstrad version (which is the most similar to the original) was particularly well received, scoring 70% in both Amstrad Action and Amtix!.

The Spectrum version gained less favourable reviews. Your Sinclair was particularly critical, giving a score of only 3/10, complaining of the "luridly coloured" background graphics and the "dreadfully repetitive" gameplay. Graham Taylor of Sinclair User could find only the character animation worthy of praise saying "the rest stinks", giving a score of 2/5. Crash gave a slightly higher score of 54% but were still mostly dismissive and did not recommend the game, claiming it was inferior to the original: "Mastertronic seem to have taken their time translating this to the Spectrum - and to be honest they shouldn't have bothered".

Jon Revis of Electron User was also unimpressed with the Acorn version, criticising the unresponsive controls and especially the fact that scenes 2 and 4, as described in the inlay, are missing from the game: "It's a pity the programmer didn't read [the inlay]. The game may only cost £1.99 but I can't help feeling Mastertronic will receive a few letters of complaint about this one". The game was given a score of 4/10 for playability but an overall score of 6/10.

== Legacy ==
Kane 2 was released in 1988 for the C64 but was not ported to any other machines. It is very similar to the first game with almost identical graphics and gameplay. Scene 1 is a riding and shooting level, scene 2 is a shooting level (like scene 3 in the first game), scene 3 is a challenge to tame a bronco and scene 4 is a riding level. The lack of improvement over two years after the original lead to negative reviews. Zzap!64 gave a score of 33% and said "it's not abysmal, it's just that it doesn't really approach the standards required of a good budget program these days. Kane was good for its time, but in mid 1988 Kane II just doesn't appeal in the same way".
