= Beaky and the Egg Snatchers =

1984 video game

- Developer: Fantasy Software
- Publisher: Fantasy Software
- Producer: Paul Dyer
- Designer: Bob Hamilton
- Programmers: ZX Spectrum; Bob Hamilton; Commodore 64; John White
- Platforms: Commodore 64, ZX Spectrum
- Release: 1984
- Genre: Action
- Mode: Single-player

Beaky and the Egg Snatchers is a 1984 Joust clone developed and published by Fantasy Software and programmed by Bob Hamilton for the ZX Spectrum. A Commodore 64 version, programmed by John White was published the same year. The player takes on the role of the last of the Andromedan Condors who must prevent their species from becoming extinct by rescuing them from egg snatchers.

== Gameplay ==
The gameplay is very similar to the 1982 arcade game Joust, but player's goals are changed with each level.

== Reception ==
Beaky and the Egg Snatchers was positively received, including two out of three approvals from Your Spectrum reviewers. It received a score of 31/40 from Computer & Video Games and 34/50 from Personal Computer Games.
