= Motor Mania (video game) =

1982 video game

- Publisher: UMI
- Designer: John Fitzpatrick
- Platform: Commodore 64
- Release: 1982
- Genre: Racing
- Mode: Single-player

Motor Mania is a top-down, vertically scrolling racing game written by John Fitzpatrick for the Commodore 64 and published by UMI in 1982, the year the system was released.

== Gameplay ==
The player drives an old-style racing car through different types of tracks avoiding enemy drivers, obstacles on the road such as nails, oil, broken glass, boulders and a fire engine at a crossroad. The game has 9 levels of difficulty.
