= Beatle Quest =

1985 video game

- Cover art by Alan Aldridge
- Developer: Number 9 Software
- Publisher: Number 9 Software
- Programmer: Garry Marsh
- Engine: The Quill
- Platform: Commodore 64, ZX Spectrum
- Release: 1985
- Genre: Text adventure
- Mode: Single-player

Beatle Quest is a text adventure video game developed and published by Number 9 Software. Written by Garry Marsh, the game was developed using The Quill software program. It was released for the Commodore 64 and ZX Spectrum computers in 1985.

Beatle Quest received mixed reception from video game critics. The game was commercially successful, debuting at number five on Commodore User's sales charts. Beatle Quest was originally going be the first game in a trilogy but the plans were abandoned.

== Gameplay ==
Beatle Quest gameplay

Beatle Quest is a text adventure video game.

== Development ==
Beatle Quest was developed and published by Number 9 Software. Garry Marsh wrote the game using The Quill programme and was given permission from ATV Music to use the lyrics from Beatles songs. A fan of The Beatles, Marsh drew inspiration from the band's lyrics to develop the games story and design. The cover art to the game was illustrated by Alan Aldridge. The game was released for Commodore 64 in 1985 and was sold through mail order.

== Reception ==
Reception

Review scores
Publication	Score
Crash	7/10
Computer and Video Games	0/10
Sinclair User	3/5
Your Sinclair	6/10
Commodore Force	55%

Beatle Quest received mixed reception from video game critics. Crash praised the game for being well crafted and atmospheric for its subject matter. Your Sinclair, while positive about the game's graphics, felt that the game would be difficult to get into for those not fans of The Beatles. A reviewer for Home Computing Weekly called the game good but nothing special. Simon Marsh for Computer and Video Games gave the game a scathing review. While not being a fan of The Beatles, he criticized the game for its depiction of drug use as a form of humor and overall gave it a rating of zero.

Beatle Quest was commercially successful, debuting at number five on Commodore User's sales charts. Marsh had made and sold 500 copies of the game. The success prompted Marsh to negotiate development of the next two games in the trilogy, provisionally titled A Day in the Life and Across the Universe. While Marsh had started on the second game, the planned trilogy was abandoned.
