= Key Quest =

Key Quest may refer to:

- Key Quest (Adventure Time), a 2026 episode of Adventure Time: Side Quests
- Key Quest, a 1983 VIC-20 clone of Tutankham
