= CJ's Elephant Antics =

1991 video game

- Developers: Genesis; Big Red (Spectrum)
- Publisher: Codemasters
- Series: CJ Elephant
- Platforms: Commodore 64, ZX Spectrum, Atari ST, Amiga, NES, IBM PC
- Release: 1991
- Genre: Platform
- Modes: Single-player, multiplayer

CJ's Elephant Antics is a platform game developed by Genesis for the Commodore 64 with conversions made for the Amiga, Atari ST, ZX Spectrum, Nintendo Entertainment System and IBM PC. All ports were handled by Genesis with the exception of the ZX Spectrum version which was handled by Big Red Software. The computer versions were published by Codemasters in 1991, with the NES game arriving in 1992 as part of the unlicensed compilation cartridge Quattro Arcade. The player controls a baby elephant by the name of Columbus Jumbo on his way home to Africa.

== Plot ==
After being captured in Africa for the purpose of being put in a zoo, turbulence hits the plane transporting CJ to England causing his cage to open, he grabs a nearby umbrella and leaps out of the airplane while somewhere over France. After landing CJ realises he will have to make his way back home to Africa on foot.

== Gameplay ==
CJ can jump, has an unlimited amount of peanuts he can fire as projectiles, and a limited number of bombs he can throw. An umbrella opens to slow down his descent when dropping from heights. The game also includes the option for two players to take part simultaneously in a co-operative fashion, though like many platformers of this era there are inherent problems in keeping both players on screen at once. CJ deals with this by only scrolling with player 1, and killing player 2 every time he leaves the screen; this system forces the players to move carefully in synchronization throughout much of the game.

Elephant Antics has a total of four levels each of which includes an end of level boss fight. The levels throughout the game are all countries that CJ must traverse to reach home, the levels are France, Switzerland, Egypt, and finally Africa. There is also a bike riding bonus stage that takes place between levels in which the player must avoid hazards and collect balloons. This mode is missing from the Spectrum and NES versions.

== Reception ==
On release the 8-bit computer versions of CJ's Elephant Antics received consistently positive reviews from major publications of the time receiving a 94% from Zzap!64, a 93% from Raze, 85% from Your Sinclair, and 81% from Crash. CJ's Elephant Antics was also numbered #55 in Crash's retrospective top 100 ZX Spectrum games feature and #34 in its public voted Spectrum top 50 of all time.

Reviews for the Amiga and Atari ST versions were more inconsistent and ranged from 83% in Amiga Force to much lower scores such as the 63% it received in Amiga Power.

== Sequels ==
CJ's Elephant Antics spawned two sequels: CJ in the USA for most home computers and CJ Elephant Fugitive for the Game Gear. There were also two games in the series that were cancelled: CJ in Space and CJ's Island Antics. CJ's Island Antics was outsourced by Codemasters to another team. Though the 3rd game in the series, CJ in Space, was never commercially released, the 4th game did see a partial release in Germany for the C64 as a free cover game with one of CP Verlag's digital magazines under the name Jimbo.

Codemasters made several games similar to CJ's Elephant Antics: DJ Puff's Volcanic Adventure and Stuntman Seymour. Both were noted for their similarities to CJ by contemporary reviewers.

== Credits ==
(All credits were taken from Codemasters' official page.)

Designed by David T. Clarke and Ashley Hogg.

Original Commodore 64 version:

- Code: David T. Clarke
- Graphics: Jonathan Smyth
- Music: Ashley Hogg

ZX Spectrum version:

- Code: R. Fred Williams
- Graphics: Peter J. Ranson and Chris Graham
- Music: Lyndon Sharp

Amiga version:

- Code: Ashley Hogg
- Graphics: Jonathan Smyth
- Music: Allister Brimble

Atari ST version:

- Code: Ashley Hogg
- Graphics: Jonathan Smyth
- Music: Allister Brimble

NES version:

- Code: Jonathan Menzies
- Graphics: Brian Hartley and Jonathan Menzies
- Music: Gavin Raeburn

IBM PC version:

- Code: Brian Beuken
- Graphics: Jonathan Smyth
- Music: Gerard Gourley
