= Steve Garvey vs. Jose Canseco in Grand Slam Baseball =

1987 video game

- Publisher: Cosmi Corporation
- Platform: Commodore 64
- Release: 1987
- Genre: Sports

Steve Garvey vs. Jose Canseco in Grand Slam Baseball is a 1987 video game published by Cosmi Corporation.

== Gameplay ==
Steve Garvey vs. Jose Canseco in Grand Slam Baseball is a game in which the visiting and home team lineup include all star major league players.

== Reception ==
David M. Wilson and Johnny L. Wilson reviewed the game for Computer Gaming World, and stated that "The graphics make excellent use of color, but the characters and animation is more reminiscent of older cartridge games than any recent releases."
