= Alter Ego (1986 video game) =

1986 video game

- Cover art for the male version; the female version's cover is almost identical, but its logo is stylized to contain a Venus symbol.
- Developer: Activision
- Publisher: Activision
- Designer: Peter J. Favaro
- Platforms: Apple II, Commodore 64, MS-DOS, Mac
- Release: NA: 27 April 1986; EU: 22 December 1986
- Genres: Social simulation, role-playing, interactive fiction
- Mode: Single-player

Alter Ego is a 1986 interactive fiction role-playing video game developed and published by Activision. It was created by Peter J. Favaro for the Commodore 64, MS-DOS, Apple II, and Macintosh. The game allows the user to make decisions for an imaginary person (being therefore the player's alter ego) and shows what possible consequences these decisions could have on that person. Alter Ego was released in both male and female versions, each using a different set of experiences.

== Gameplay ==
The player reads through the scenes in each node, and makes decisions for them to develop their character.

The player's alter ego begins the game as an infant; the game presents the user with a tree diagram with nodes, each labeled with an icon. The player chooses an icon representing an "experience" or situation to explore. Each icon bears a symbol showing what kind of experience it represents (for example, a heart denotes an emotional event). After making a choice in each node, the user is moved back to the tree with that node marked as completed. In this manner, the user progresses through the alter ego's entire life and examines what impact their decisions had. In the process of playing the game, the player's alter ego proceeds through seven phases with their respective experiences: infancy, childhood, adolescence, young adulthood, adulthood, middle adulthood, and old age. Some of these experiences are disturbing, and can even lead to premature death (such as being abducted by a child molester or mistakenly consuming poison), though most tend to be humorous and playful.

Alter Ego keeps track of certain player statistics throughout the game, which in turn affect the alter ego's ability to succeed at certain choices. For example, in the high school segment, the player might be given the choice of trying out for the school baseball team, or deciding instead to crack down and study harder to improve in math. This decision might change the alter ego's "Physical", "Confidence", and "Intellectual" statistics, which in future experiences might influence the alter ego's ability to get into college or succeed in social situations.

== Development ==
The game's designer, Dr. Peter J. Favaro, was not a game designer by trade. He studied clinical psychology and would go on to be a professional psychologist, but had a long fascination with computers and video games going back to his experience with a teletype terminal running BASIC in high school, and playing Cinematronics Space Wars in his first year as a graduate student at Hofstra University in 1978.

After writing to Atari that he could add something with his knowledge of psychology and human behaviour, he worked as a consultant to the company and began doing research on psychological aspects of video game design and play. In 1983, he wrote his master’s thesis titled The Effects of Computer Video Game Play on Mood, Physiological Arousal, and Psychomotor Performance. It was one of the first physiological studies on video games, and in turn Favaro was one of the first psychologists to study the effects of video games on players.

Around the same time, he grew an interest in writing games himself. He bought an Atari 800 computer, tinkered in programming in machine language, assembler and early iterations of C, and would write games for various computer magazines like SoftSide and Family Computing. One of his most notable creations was Success, a multi-player Life-like computerized board game that starts by having you choose a personality — “aggressive,” “impulsive,” “pragmatic,” or “romantic” — and a goal in life — “money,” “knowledge and intellectual curiosity,” or “health and happiness.”

The development of these games by using his academic background laid the foundation for what would become Alter Ego. When designing the game, he had two goals in mind out of his “love for game design and the prospect of making some money,” using his academic background as “a way of breaking out of the pack of other designers.”

To develop the game, he interviewed hundreds of men and women about their most memorable life experiences, then examined the interviews and looked for common experiences to choose the experiences that many people shared.

This caught the attention of Jim Levy of Activision, who was looking for more ambitious projects to keep the company afloat after it was hit by the video game crash of 1983 and managed to bounce back with the success of David Crane's video game adaptation of Ghostbusters.

After writing and prototyping the game on the Macintosh, Activision contracted the final programming out to two outside developers: Kottwitz & Associates for ports on the Apple II and MS-DOS, and Unimac to do ports for Macintosh and Commodore 64 versions. Activision loved the cachet bestowed on the project by Favaro’s status as an actual psychologist so much that they always made sure to refer to him in the packaging, the manual, and advertisements only as “Peter J. Favaro, PhD.”

== Reception ==
Reception

Review score
Publication	Score
Zzap!64	98%

Johnny Wilson of Computer Gaming World described the game as "a delightful, humorous and thought-provoking exercise in decision-making, value exploration and evaluation, and vicarious wish-fulfillment." He raised minor qualms concerning the disconnect between past experiences and current situations, and the mild tendency of the game to be "preachy". The magazine's Charles Ardai described it as "fascinating the first time out" but repetitive later. Info gave the Commodore 64 version five stars out of five, describing it as "some of the most broadly therapeutic and consciousness-raising software available", and "very entertaining". The reviewer concluded "I would recommend this wholesome software to anyone old enough to read".

The game was also positively reviewed by Zzap!64 magazine.

== Later ports and re-releases ==
In 2000, Dan Fabulich ported the game as a free, fan-made Java web application. In 2009 Choice of Games LLC, a company founded by Fabulich and Adam Strong-Morse, commercially released Android and iOS ports of their version, followed by a Kindle version in 2012. In 2015, they replaced their free web version with one following a paid model service with a free trial. A version for Windows, Mac and Linux was released in 2017 via Steam.
