= Colony (video game) =

1987 video game

- Developer: Icon Design
- Publisher: Mastertronic (Bulldog)
- Designer: Ste Cork
- Platforms: Amstrad CPC, Atari 8-bit, Commodore 64, MSX, ZX Spectrum
- Release: EU: 1987
- Genre: Action-adventure
- Mode: Single-player

Colony is an action-adventure game written by Ste Cork and released in 1987 for the Amstrad CPC, Atari 8-bit computers, Commodore 64, MSX, and ZX Spectrum by Mastertronic on their Bulldog label.

== Plot ==
Overpopulation has caused humanity to grow food in colonies on other planets. Unfortunately, the mushroom-growing planet that the player is responsible for is also inhabited by hostile native aliens which resemble giant insects. The player must use the droid under their control to maintain and harvest the mushrooms as well as look after and protect the colony itself.

== Gameplay ==
The bugs tore through the fence near the solar panel field (Atari 8-bit screenshot)

Gameplay takes place in a flip-screen environment consisting of the colony itself (which is made-up of storehouses, some specialist buildings, mushroom fields and areas for solar panels) and the surrounding desert of the alien planet which is filled with various giant insects.

There are numerous things that the player must look-after.

=== Mushrooms ===
The purpose of the colony is to grow mushrooms for shipment back to Earth. These mushrooms will only grow in the green (i.e. lush) areas. They begin as seeds and quickly grow, eventually reaching a stage of maturity at which point they can be collected in order to be deposited for money and later for pick-up by a spacecraft. Unfortunately, the mushrooms are one of many things that the insects like to eat. The player can pick mature mushrooms which have been partially eaten by aliens but when deposited these will award no payment as they are unfit for human consumption.

=== Security fencing ===
The colony is surrounded by a security fence which keeps the giant insects out of the colony and from causing mischief therein. Unfortunately, the fence is constantly under attack by the insects who can chew their way through them. The player's droid must maintain the fence by destroying the marauding insects and replacing damaged or destroyed pieces of fence. Damaged fence sections can be deposited at a fence storehouse for repair. There are three different types of security-fencing which can be used - barbed wire (which is the weakest), wooden-fencing (the default fencing-type which is already in use around the colony when the game starts) and steel fencing (the strongest fencing type).

=== Power ===
The colony is powered by free-standing solar panels which are located within the colony. These provide power in order to recharge the droid's shields and weapons as well as for the landing beacon (required when a spaceship is about to land). Unfortunately, the insects chew these to pieces as well and can devastate the colony's power supply if not checked. As with fencing, the droid can repair damaged panels at the correct storehouse as well as find replacements for destroyed panels.

=== Spaceship ===
Once plenty of mushrooms have been grown and safely packed-away for pick-up the player can send a message to Earth to have a spaceship sent en route to the colony to pick up. The player can also order supplies (extra seeds, fencing, panels and other useful items) for the ship to deliver. The game provides an ETA for the ship which the player must keep an eye on. The ship requires the colony's landing beacon to be on when it arrives. If the beacon is on then the ship will land at the landing-bay (the player must not be on this screen at the time or the droid will be crushed!), drop off its crates of supplies there and pay for the mushrooms (the money can be used when next ordering supplies). If the beacon is not on, the ship will dump all the supplies at random in the surrounding desert and many of them will be lost to the aliens. The beacon drains the colony's power-supply quickly so it is important to only leave it on as long as necessary and also to ensure that the colony's power-storage is suitably high before activating it.

=== Traps ===
The player's droid can also set traps almost anywhere in the colony and the desert in order to destroy the giant insects. These traps work only once.

In addition, there are also "permanent" traps covering areas where the colony is completely open to the desert (e.g. at the main entrance, where there is no fencing). These traps always destroy insects that wander into them without disappearing. However, they are reliant on the colony's power supply and if the player allows the power to drop too low these traps will disappear.

== Reception ==
Colony received a score of 5/10 from Commodore User. It reached number two in the Atari charts behind BMX Simulator.
