= Everyone's a Wally =

1985 video game

Everyone's A Wally
- Developer: Chris Hinsley
- Publisher: Mikro-Gen
- Platforms: ZX Spectrum, Amstrad CPC, Commodore 64
- Release: 23 February 1985
- Genre: Adventure
- Mode: Single-player

Everyone's a Wally is a British video game released in 1985 by Mikro-Gen for the ZX Spectrum, Amstrad CPC, and Commodore 64. The sequel to Pyjamarama, it features the same hero character, Wally Week, and uses an upgraded version of the same game engine.

== Gameplay ==
Everyone's a Wally was the first arcade adventure game to feature multiple playable characters: Wally Week (a builder and handyman), Wilma (his wife), Tom (a punk mechanic), Dick (a plumber) and Harry (a hippie electrician). Herbert, the baby son of Wally and Wilma, appeared in the game as a mobile hazard NPC. The player can change character when in the same location as another - those not being controlled wander around the village carrying on their own chores and business. The character switch and the chores attendance simulation were original at the time. The energy ("endurance") of each character is decreased when in contact with NPCs; the game ends if characters deplete their energy.

The aim of the game is to complete a day's worth of work for each character and retrieve a letter, which spells out a password to open a safe holding everyone's wages. The eventual password is "BREAK" - knowing this does not spoil the game since most of the letters can be seen before jobs are complete; the game requires them to be actually collected before allowing the safe to open.

== Development ==
Everyone's a Wally started out as Life of Wally and was written by Chris Hinsley - although in an interview with Crash, Paul Denial stated that the entire Mikro-Gen team had input into both character design and coding.

The game (as Life) was given an advance mention in Pyjamarama, released the year before.

== Song ==
The original tape cassette version of Everyone's a Wally featured a Mike Berry song about the game recorded as an audio track on the B side.
