= Bazooka Bill =

1985 video game

- Developer: Melbourne House
- Publisher: Melbourne House
- Platforms: Commodore 64, ZX Spectrum
- Release: 1985
- Genre: Action
- Mode: Single-player

Bazooka Bill is a side-scrolling video game created by Melbourne House in 1985 for the Commodore 64. It was also ported to the ZX Spectrum. It is a clone of the video game Green Beret. The game starts off with a soldier known as Bazooka Bill on a mission to rescue General Douglas MacArthur.

== Gameplay ==
Bazooka Bill has to rescue General MacArthur who is being held on an archipelago consisting of the Leyte, Mindano and Corregidor Islands, making up levels 2-4 of the game. The first level tasks Bill with getting to Clark Airbase to fly to each island where he is accosted by enemy soldiers and must fight his way through them.

The player can use punches, a throwing knife, machine gun, flamethrower, and later a bazooka. With the exception of punching, each weapon is picked up as Bill moves through the level, and lasts for a timed duration before reverting Bill back to basic punching. Despite the game name, the bazooka only appears as a timed weapon on stages two and four.

Each level is in the run and gun format, with enemies approaching Bill from both sides of the screen. Levels also include helicopters out of Bill's range, that drop bombs on him as they pass. After completing each main level a sub-level consists of Bill flying to the next island. These stages are similar to the previous run and gun format with enemy planes and helicopters approaching Bill from both directions, but Bill has movement over the entire screen to engage or avoid them.

== Reception ==
Bazooka Bill was polarised by reviewers. For the Commodore 64 version, Zzap!64 gave it 30%, stating "...don't buy Bazooka Bill, just go to the computer shop and laugh at it", whereas Computer and Video Games rated it as a C+VG HIT! awarding it 9/10 saying "Bazooka Bill is an action packed, addictive, arcade blaster". The ZX Spectrum version was equally varied - Sinclair User gave it four stars out of five, but said "there isn't anything new in it [...] themewise and programmingwise, but it ought to do well" and Your Sinclair gave it four out of ten - "I reckon this one should be renamed 'Bazooka Bilge'! But you might like it!"
