= Ardant =

Ardant is a surname. Notable people with the surname include:

- Fanny Ardant (born 1949), French actress and film director
- Philippe Ardant (1929–2007), French jurist
