= Mikro-Gen =

Former British video game developer

- Industry: Computer software
- Founded: 1981
- Founder: Mike Meek, Andrew Lawrie
- Defunct: 1987
- Fate: Acquired by Creative Sparks Distribution
- Headquarters: Bracknell, England

Mikro-Gen was a UK software company based in Bracknell, Berkshire that produced games for home computers in the early to mid-1980s.

The company was formed by Mike Meek and Andrew Laurie in 1981, in order to capitalise on the growing boom of microcomputers in the home. The company had a solid reputation but became more prominent with its series of games featuring Wally Week and his family, all of which got excellent reviews in the highly respected computer magazine Crash. Later, the company produced the Mikro-Plus add-on for the ZX Spectrum.

The company was bought out by Creative Sparks Distribution in 1987, which subsequently went into receivership six months later.

== Releases ==
- Star Trek - 1982.
- Knockout - 1983.
- Mad Martha - 1983.
- Genesis II - 1984 - written by Dale & Shelley McLoughlin.
- Witch's Cauldron - 1985 - written by Dale & Shelley McLoughlin
- Laserwarp - 1983; Reviewed in Crash with an overall score of 77%
- Air Traffic Control - 1984 - by Dale McLoughlin
- Shadow of the Unicorn - 1985. Reviewed in Crash issue 24 - 7/10 - required Mikro-Plus Expansion Unit to run
- Battle of the Planets - 1985. Reviewed in Crash issue 26 - 71%
- Equinox - 1986. Reviewed in Crash issue 30 - 87%
- Stainless Steel - 1986.

=== Wally Week series ===
- Automania - 1984. Reviewed in Crash with an overall score of 88%
- Pyjamarama - 1984. Reviewed in Crash issue 10 - 92%
- Everyone's A Wally - 1985. Reviewed in Crash issue 14 - 93%
- Herbert's Dummy Run - 1985. Reviewed in Crash issue 18 - 90%
- Three Weeks in Paradise - 1985. Reviewed in Crash issue 26 - 93%

=== Mikro-Plus ===
The Mikro-Plus was an add-on for the ZX Spectrum computer. While this computer was limited to 48KB of usable RAM, the Mikro-Plus let it load 64KB programs by storing 16KB as a shadow ROM in the add-on itself, and loading the remaining 48KB from cassette tape as usual. Mikro-Gen invested £130,000 in producing it. Bundled with the game Shadow of the Unicorn, it reached no. 5 in the ZX Spectrum charts and no.9 in the All Formats charts in October 1985. It sold 11,000 copies, almost 30,000 short of the number needed to break even and no further Mikro-Plus games were produced.
