= Frogrun! =

1983 video game

- Publisher: Anirog Software
- Programmers: Commodore 64; Jef Gamon; ZX Spectrum; S.J. Dann
- Platforms: VIC-20, Commodore 64, ZX Spectrum
- Release: 1983: VIC; 1984: C64, Spectrum
- Genre: Action
- Mode: Single-player

Frogrun! (also Frog Run) is a Frogger clone published by Anirog Software for the VIC-20 home computer in 1983. A Commodore 64 version programmed by Jef Gamon was published in 1984 as Frogrun 64. A ZX Spectrum version by S.J. Dann was released with the name Frog Run.

== Gameplay ==
The game follows the structure of Frogger: maneuver across a busy road, then hop on floating objects to reach the frog homes on the other side of a river.

The player has 25 seconds to make a frog reach its home. Points are awarded for moving a frog forward and taking it home. Players get bonus points for jumping on a lady frog and taking all the frogs home.
