= Colonial Conquest =

1985 video game

- Apple II cover
- Developers: Strategic Simulations; Andromeda Software (ST, PC-98)
- Publisher: Strategic Simulations
- Designer: Dan Cermak
- Platforms: Apple II, Atari 8-bit, Atari ST, Commodore 64, PC-98
- Release: 1985: Atari 8-bit, C64; 1986: Apple II; 1987: Atari ST; 1989: PC-98
- Genre: Turn-based strategy
- Modes: Single-player, multiplayer

Colonial Conquest is a turn-based strategy video game developed by Strategic Simulations and released in 1985 for the Atari 8-bit computers and Commodore 64, followed by the Apple II in 1986. Ports by Andromeda Software were released for the Atari ST in 1987 and PC-98 in 1989.

A game titled Colonial Conquest II was released for Amiga in 1994, but it is unrelated to the original game by SSI.

A reboot, titled Colonial Conquest, was released in 2015 on Steam, following a successful Kickstarter campaign to develop a game that would be a "homage" to the original game.

== Game mechanics ==
In-game screenshot

Based on the principles of Risk (but without dice rolling), in Colonial Conquest, the player controls armies and ships in order to conquer the world. The game matches the historical context of the Scramble for Africa, and the scenario begins in the year 1880.

The player can pick one of the six major powers of the time: England, Germany, France, United States, Japan, and Russia.

The land and naval forces of each country have varying attack and defense values, as well as different costs. For example, Russia spends three times less money for the recruitment of its ground troops than England, but in return, the Russian offensive and defensive value will be much lower than that of their British counterparts.

Three scenarios are available:

1. Standard Game (None of the Major Countries have any overseas colonies)
2. 1880: Race For The Colonies (beginning of the large-scale colonization)
3. 1914: Brink Of the War (the forces of the Triple Entente and the Triple Alliance clash)

== Reception ==
Reception

Review scores
Publication	Score
Computer Gaming World	3.5/5
Computer and Video Games	8/10
Commodore User	8/10

Stewart McKames reviewed the game for Computer Gaming World and stated that "Colonial Conquest is not a serious recreation of the colonial era. What it is, is a challenging and enjoyable multi-player or solitaire game. While containing the flavor of the period, it plays easily and gives ample opportunity for the Diplomat or the General in you to stab your opponents, conquer territories, and build an Empire on which the sun never sets."

Robbie Robberson reviewed Colonial Conquest in Space Gamer/Fantasy Gamer No. 77. Robberson commented that "Colonial Conquest is a good game and provides a lot of fun, especially with five or six players."
