= Catalypse =

1992 video game

- Cover art
- Developer(s): Genias
- Publisher(s): Genias
- Composer(s): Michael Tschögl
- Platform(s): Commodore 64
- Release: NA: 1992; EU: 1992
- Genre(s): Scrolling shooter
- Mode(s): Single-player

Catalypse is a horizontally scrolling shooter released for the Commodore 64 by Genias in 1992, programmed by Andrea Pompili and music written by Michael Tschögl. Players pilot a small space fighter through five long stages collecting four types of power-ups including a spread-shot weapon, a large laser beam, a ricocheting laser and Options.

== Plot ==
Somewhere in space, the planetary inhabitants of an alien solar system arrange a collective, peaceful federation that agrees to dismantle their military powers. Only the planet Clio disagrees with the federation's ideals and retaliates by attacking the other planets with its superior space military. The federation sends an advanced space fighter to Clio to stop its planetary military and assassinate its mysterious leader.
