= Bird Mother =

1984 video game

- Developer: Andromeda Software
- Publisher: Creative Sparks
- Designer: Pál Balog
- Composer: Zoltán Mericske
- Platform: Commodore 64
- Release: 1984
- Genre: Action game
- Mode: Single-player

Bird Mother (Hungarian: Madár mama) is a 1984 action game developed by Novotrade (Andromeda Software) and published by Creative Sparks for the Commodore 64.

== Gameplay ==
As the Bird Mother the player must collect twigs to build a nest then lay three eggs in it once it has been completed. The next task is to catch flying insects to provide food for the offspring which have now hatched. They must also be defended from attacks by moving them around. The final challenge is to teach the young birds to fly. When this has been done the game progresses to a higher difficulty level.

== Reception ==
Bird Mother received review scores of 26/40 from Personal Computer Games and 33/40 from Computer & Video Games.
