= Legions of Death =

- Developer: MC Lothlorien
- Publisher: Argus Press Software
- Platforms: Amstrad CPC, Commodore 64, ZX Spectrum
- Release: 1986
- Genre: Strategy

Legions of Death is a one or two-player strategy video game published for the Commodore 64, Amstrad CPC and ZX Spectrum personal computers. It requires players to control the navies of ancient Rome and Carthage during the Punic Wars, in order to conquer the Mediterranean Sea.

== Gameplay ==
Legions of Death is a one or two-player strategy game set during the Punic Wars between ancient Rome and Carthage. In single-player mode the player controls the fleet of Carthage, while in two-player mode one player controls the Roman navy while the other controls the Carthaginian fleet. Each player must try to destroy their opponent's fleet and gain control of the Mediterranean.

At the start of play each player receives a number of points to construct their navy using a combination of faster biremes and triremes, along with various heavier combat ships, up to Heptares class. Additional points may be spent to upgrade individual ships, such as adding marine detachments, archer platforms, and boarding hooks. Lighter ships can be used to collect funds from outlying ports and transport it back to the player's home port, while heavier ships are needed to counter the other player's attacking fleet, as they can more effectively ram and sink enemy vessels.

Gameplay is turn-based, with movement resolved simultaneously, and plays out on a square grid. Ships may accelerate or decelerate each turn by one speed point, up to a speed limit which depends on the class of ship. Ships may turn up to 45 degrees maximum per unit of movement (so no right-angle turns). This movement system adds a unique tactical element in which the player must carefully plan out routes and speeds several turns ahead in order to intercept enemy ships, and bring ships into harbours without crashing.

== Reception ==
Reception

Review scores
Publication	Score
Amstrad Action	82%
Crash	84%
Computer and Video Games	32/40
Sinclair User	5/5
Your Sinclair	8/10

Legions of Death received generally positive reviews.
