= Falcon Patrol II =

1984 video game

- Publisher: Virgin Games
- Designer: Steve Lee
- Platforms: Commodore 64, ZX Spectrum
- Release: 1984: C64; 1985: Spectrum
- Genre: Scrolling shooter
- Mode: Single-player

Falcon Patrol II (also called Falcon Patrol 2 on the box) is a horizontally scrolling shooter for the Commodore 64 written by Steve Lee and published by Virgin Games in 1984. A ZX Spectrum port was released in 1985. Falcon Patrol II is the sequel to the 1983 game Falcon Patrol.

== Gameplay ==
Gameplay screenshot

Falcon Patrol II is a scrolling shooter over a landscape resembling Egypt or the Middle East. The player controls a jet fighter and has to destroy a set number of enemy helicopters to clear a level. The helicopters come in three forms:

1. Transport: unarmed helicopter that lays missile turrets and radar interference devices on the ground
2. Gunship: escorts the transport helicopters and shoots at the fighter
3. Solo: fast combat helicopter that goes right after the fighter.

The jet fighter has a finite supply of fuel and ammunition, but both can be replenished by landing on a landing pad.
