= Bozo's Night Out =

1984 video game

- North American box art
- Developer(s): Taskset
- Publisher(s): Taskset
- Programmer(s): Tony Gibson
- Artist(s): Mark Harrison
- Composer(s): Paul Hodgson
- Platform(s): Commodore 64
- Release: NA: 1984; EU: 1984
- Genre(s): Action
- Mode(s): Single-player

Bozo's Night Out is an action game developed by Taskset and published in 1984 for the Commodore 64. The game centers on Bozo, a drunkard trying to get home safely after spending a night at a bar.

== Gameplay ==
As Bozo, the player must avoid obstacles and people to get home safely

Bozo can run into many obstacles on his journey home; he can fall into trap doors, get caught by the police, run into people, and even run into ghosts and dragons. If Bozo can successfully get home, he drinks five more pints the next night at the pub ("Gibbo's Joint") and this process repeats until the Bozo reaches 60 pints. As Bozo drinks, the controls get looser and he starts to see pink elephants. The effects of increasing difficulty include more pedestrians which the player needs to evade (all of which automatically end the night by either attacking him or jailing him), manhole covers disappear with increasing variation, Bozo staggers more making walking in a straight line near impossible without repeated intervention which in itself is hard.

If Bozo cannot successfully get home he loses anywhere from one to five pints, and the game starts over if Bozo runs out of his pints of drunkenness.

Getting home with 60 pints (the game does not automatically end at 60 pints) results in the player receiving a "Bozo Rotten Liver Award" and the game ending on a screen of a hospital bed.

== Development ==
Ideas which were considered during development included using a display to indicate how full the character's bladder was, and to require that it would have to be emptied on occasion. References to alcohol were mostly removed from the game with the drinks being described as 'wobble juice', although there were still some names on the high score table which were obvious allusions to well known brands.

Bozo's Night Out was bundled with a registration card, which could be mailed back to Taskset for information regarding any future releases from Taskset. The game was programmed by Tony Gibson, illustrated by Mark Harrison, and Paul Hodgson composed the game's music.
