= Championship 3D Snooker =

1992 video game

- Developer: Steven Walters
- Publisher: Zeppelin Games Limited
- Composer: Sonic Graffiti
- Platforms: Commodore 64, ZX Spectrum
- Release: EU: 1992
- Genre: Sports simulation – snooker
- Modes: Single-player, multiplayer

Championship 3D Snooker is a sports simulation video game developed and created by Steven Walters and published by Zeppelin Games Limited in 1992. Championship 3D Snooker simulates the cue sport snooker, and is an early pioneer of 3D computer graphics in snooker games, first used in Jimmy White's 'Whirlwind' Snooker, and would be adopted for most snooker games that followed, including the Virtual Pool series.

The game was released in 64 bit graphics for the Commodore 64 and ZX Spectrum.

== Overview ==
Championship 3D Snooker is played on a traditional Snooker table, with the ability to play against the AI, or against an opponent.

== Reception ==
Reception

Review scores
Publication	Score
Sinclair User	86%
Your Sinclair	70%
Zzap!	87%
Commodore Format	88%

Critical response to the game was generally well received. Steve Keen of Sinclair User scored the game at 86% calling the game "enjoyable, challenging, lasting and good fun." Your Sinclair were also positive about the game, scoring lower at 70% calling the game a "Cheap, and cheerful Snooker Sim" Zzap! gave the game a high 87% Score, saying "it certainly beats watching Snooker on the telly." Commodore Format were also very strong on the game, scoring 88% saying the game was "sophisticated", before satirically saying it was "better than real Snooker."
