= Evolution (1982 video game) =

- Developers: Don Mattrick and Jeff Sember
- Platforms: Apple II, IBM PC, Atari, Commodore 64, and ColecoVision
- Release: 1982
- Genre: Science fiction
- Mode: Single-player

Evolution is a 1982 video game developed by Sydney Data Products. It was released on the Apple II, IBM PC, Atari, Commodore 64, and ColecoVision. It was the only game that Sydney ever developed for the ColecoVision software. The game was developed by Don Mattrick and Jeff Sember, who were seventeen and eighteen years old, respectively.

== Overview ==
The game is divided into six stages, each based around a different lifeform. Players take control of the central lifeform in each stage and attempt to survive. The stages include: "Amoeba", "Frog", "Rodent", "Beaver", "Gorilla", and "Human". Each stage involves different gameplay mechanics and strategy to complete. It supports both keyboard and joystick controls, and features full color graphics.

The first three levels deal with players controlling a lifeform that must eat and avoid being eaten. During the "Amoeba" stage, players must eat DNA and avoid being killed by spores, antibodies, and microbes. During the "Frog" stage, players eat water flies and avoid being eaten by fish, while the "Rodent" stage involves digging tunnels to avoid snakes.

As players progress to stages with more evolved species, their goals become more complex. The "Beaver" stage requires players to build a dam while avoiding alligators. In the "Gorilla" stage, players must hit monkeys with apples to prevent them from stealing their coconuts. The final stage takes place in the future, during a conflict between humans and mutants. The player must kill ten mutant revolutionaries to complete the final stage. The stage ends after a nuclear apocalypse that resets the evolutionary cycle, returning to the "amoeba" level. The game has three difficulty settings: beginner, intermediate, and expert.

== Reception ==
The game received praise for its gameplay, concept, full color graphics, and sound design. A review in PC Magazine called Evolution "a higher game form. This is a very clever, well designed game that may mark another step in the evolutionary chain from Pong, past Space Invaders, and into worlds yet unimagined." Susan Levitan of Videogaming and Computer Gaming Illustrated wrote that "Evolution's graphics are excellent. Sound effects for each environment are exquisitely detailed. The game never becomes repetitive; each evolutionary stage presents a new challenge, a new strategy." Kevin Oleniacz wrote that the game "could be considered as six games crammed onto one cartridge, as each stage contains its own unique style of play and unrelated objectives."

A review in Softalk described the game's central concept as bleak but fascinating, revolving around cycles of violence throughout evolutionary history that culminates in nuclear destruction during life's most advanced stage.
