= True Detective (disambiguation) =

True Detective is an American anthology crime drama television series that debuted in 2014.

True Detective may also refer to:

- "True Detective", an essay by David Sedaris collected in the 1997 book Naked
- True Detective (magazine), an American true crime magazine that ran from 1924 to 1995
- True Detective, a 1983 novel by Max Allan Collins
- The True Detective, a 1987 novel by Theodore Weesner
