= Agent X II: The Mad Prof's Back =

1987 video game

Agent X
- Developers: Steven Tatlock, John Tatlock, Tim Follin
- Publisher: Mastertronic
- Platforms: Sinclair Spectrum, Amstrad CPC and Commodore 64
- Release: 1987
- Genres: Shoot 'em up, Platform game, Breakout clone
- Mode: Single-player

Agent X II: The Mad Prof's Back is a computer game released in 1987 for the ZX Spectrum, Amstrad CPC and Commodore 64. It is the follow-up to the ZX Spectrum game Agent X.

The player takes control of the eponymous Agent X in a multi-load game made up of a number of sub-games.

== Story ==
The mad professor has returned, seeking revenge after Agent X foiled his plan to brainwash the President. This time he is out to ruin the world economy. He has set up an underground base on the Moon. From this hideout he plans to unleash his terrible Zit-Ray, a device that causes everybody to break out in terrible terminal acne. The mad prof plans that, with spending so much money on spot remover cream - which, due to the terrible effects of the Zit-Ray, will not work anyway - the economy will be in ruins, as no-one will have any money left for essentials. Agent X must travel to the Moon, surprise the scientist, and destroy the zit-ray,

== Gameplay ==
In-game screen from the ZX Spectrum version of the game

Agent X II is split into three different subgames. The first level is a side scrolling shoot 'em up in a similar vein to Gradius. Level 2 is a platform game, set in a tower of screens, each with three floors. Each screen contains a computer terminal, a floating code number, and an assortment of enemies. Agent X must jump from level to level collecting codes, entering them into the computers and killing the aliens. After three codes have been entered, a final code must be typed into the lowest terminal and a snake-like alien destroyed before the task is completed. The third and final level is a Breakout clone.

== Reception ==
Reception

Review scores
Publication	Score
Crash	56%
Sinclair User	3/10
Your Sinclair	6/10

Reviews were generally poor, with Your Sinclair rating it at 6/10, CRASH giving it 56%, and Sinclair User giving only 3/10.

Mike Dunn of CRASH said of the game "Despite decent graphics, Agent X II is a real disappointment after the fun and frolics of its predecessor", and Your Sinclair's Nat Pryce said of the third level: "Worst of all, there seems to be no skill involved - you can't aim the ball as in Arkanoid, it just zips around all over the place. Unplayable, I'm afraid." Sinclair User called the game an "Extremely disappointing follow-up to an excellent original. Highly unoriginal and dull. Don't bother."

== See also ==
- Agent X (1986 video game)
