= Mission Omega =

1986 video game

- Developer: Stephen Ward
- Publisher: Argus Press
- Platforms: ZX Spectrum, Commodore 64, Amstrad CPC
- Release: 1986
- Genre: Action adventure
- Mode: Single player

Mission Omega is a computer game published in 1986 by Argus Press Software for the ZX Spectrum, Commodore 64 and Amstrad CPC home computers. It was programmed by Stephen Ward.

== Gameplay ==
The United States of Europe vessel, Windwraith, has been sent to intercept a mysterious object the size of a small moon which is speeding towards Earth. Robots must infiltrate the mystery-ship (dubbed the "Omega") and deactivate it within the hour or Earth will be destroyed.

Gameplay involves a mixture of arcade adventure, maze game and strategy. The player controls robots (which are designed, built and named in-game) around the interior of the Omega and must shut down its four reactors. These robots have a limited amount of artificial intelligence and can be programmed to take set routes or allowed to explore of their own accord. The player can also directly control the robots. Occasionally, simple puzzles (often involving setting levers correctly) must be solved or hostile robots aboard the Omega must be combatted.

The player has one hour in real-time to deactivate Omega's four reactors.

== Critical reception ==
CRASH magazine found Mission Omega to be "an interesting, difficult but colourful and enjoyable hybrid game that should appeal to equally to strategy and arcade fans." However, the instructions printed on the cassette inlay were criticized for being contradictory and lacking keyboard controls.
