= Dan Dare: Pilot of the Future =

1986 video game

- Developer: Gang of Five
- Publishers: Virgin Games, Electronic Arts
- Platforms: ZX Spectrum, Amstrad CPC, Commodore 64
- Release: 1986
- Genre: Action-adventure
- Mode: Single-player

Dan Dare: Pilot of the Future is a 1986 video game by Virgin Games for the ZX Spectrum, Amstrad CPC and Commodore 64 home computer systems. It is based on the classic British comic strip Dan Dare. The Commodore 64 version was considerably different in gameplay to the ZX Spectrum and Amstrad CPC versions.

== Plot ==
The Mekon reveals his typically dastardly plan: Earth must submit to his terms or he will propel a hollowed-out asteroid the size of a small planet into Earth. Dan and his sidekick Digby fly to the asteroid in Dan's spaceship, the Anastasia. Arriving at the asteroid they find small buildings and structures and realise it must be inhabited. Digby remains on the ship whilst Dan is lowered down to the asteroid's surface. Once again, Earth is relying on him to defeat the Mekon.

== Versions ==
=== Spectrum and Amstrad CPC ===
Dan is armed with only a laser gun. He must progress through the levels, acquiring the five pieces of an explosive device. Each piece is hidden somewhere within a section of the game, the first piece collected unlocks the door to the area containing the second piece and so on. On the way he encounters foot soldiers, also known as Treens (which he can shoot but which shoot back), floorguns (which can be destroyed by jumping on them) and wall guns (which can usually be destroyed by shooting them).

Any enemy contact or getting shot will cause Dan to lose energy. If it reaches zero, Dan is "captured" and returned to a prison cell from which he then escapes, but it is some distance from most of the accessible parts of the complex and also causes lost time. Should Dan fire too much, his gun will run out of ammo (which can be replenished by collecting ammo powerups). Should Dan run out of time before he can assemble the five parts of the bomb, the Mekon has won again.

=== Commodore 64 ===
Dan does not use a gun in this version, preferring to deal with Treen guards by using his boxing skills. He must progress first through the planet's surface and subterranean lakes, where he must solve various puzzles and collect items to enable him to progress down into the Mekon's heavily guarded base. Here he must fight hordes of Treen guards, find and free Digby and the Professor, before destroying three supercomputers with a giant laser. The final scene sees Dan tackling the Mekon in a hand-to-hand grenade battle. Having destroyed the Mekon, he has just two minutes to return to the planet's surface and escape.

The whole game takes place over 25 minutes in real time. Dan fails the mission if he has not destroyed the Mekon and escaped within this time.

== Reception ==
Reception

Awards
Publication	Award
Crash	Crash Smash
Sinclair User	SU Classic
Your Sinclair	Megagame

Zzap!64 enjoyed the Commodore 64 version of the game which was said to be "a highly original and playable arcade adventure". It received an overall rating of 94%. The game went to number 2 in the UK sales charts, behind Super Cycle.

== Legacy ==
The game was followed by two sequels, Dan Dare II: Mekon's Revenge and Dan Dare III: The Escape.
