= The Detective (video game) =

1986 video game

- Cover art
- Developer: Sam Manthorpe
- Publisher: Argus Press Software
- Composer: Sam Manthorpe
- Platform: Commodore 64
- Release: Commodore 64: NA: 1986; EU: 1986
- Genre: Adventure
- Mode: Single-player

The Detective is a 1986 video game by Sam Manthorpe and published by Argus Press Software.

== Gameplay ==
In the role of a Scotland Yard detective, the player arrives at the McFungus estate in London, 1974. Angus McFungus is murdered and the player is challenged to collect evidence and reveal the murderer. The game functions on a strict time limit and the player loses the case if the murderer cannot be found in time.

== Remake ==
A freeware version of the game was released for the Nintendo DS on December 20, 2009. The game can be downloaded on the official website and cannot be purchased in stores.
