= Hunter's Moon (video game) =

1987 video game

- Publisher: Thalamus
- Programmer: Martin Walker
- Composer: Matt Gray
- Platform: Commodore 64
- Release: 1987
- Genre: Shoot 'em up

Hunter's Moon is a shoot 'em up programmed by Martin Walker for the Commodore 64 and published by Thalamus in 1987. The music was composed by Matt Gray.

== Summary ==
Despite the game being a single ~64kb binary, the game world is large: there are 128 levels divided to 32 star systems. It is an example of procedural content generation in early computer games.

Each level takes place in a void with two dimensional cities appearing as they are being built by "worker cells". The worker cells are indestructible but the bricks dropped by them can be temporarily destroyed using the ship's weapon. The goal of the game is to collect enough star cells contained inside the cities to get to the next level. By collecting enough star cells within a strict time limit (displayed in the lower score table) it is possible to skip the remaining levels in current star system and pass on to the next, allowing skilled players to advance the game quicker.

According to the game's creator Martin Walker, Hunter's Moon was inspired by the children's toy Spirograph.

== Reception ==
Hunter's Moon received a score of 92% in computer games magazine Zzap!64, earning its Sizzler accolade for games rated 90-95% overall. The magazine also went on to chronicle the production of Martin Walker's next game, Citadel, in a diary column named Walker's Way.
