= Agent X (1986 video game) =

- Developers: Steven Tatlock; John Tatlock; Tim Follin
- Publisher: Mastertronic
- Platform: ZX Spectrum
- Release: 1986
- Genre: Shoot 'em up
- Mode: Single-player

Agent X, also known as Agent X in the Brain Drain Caper, is a computer game released in 1986 for the ZX Spectrum. The player takes control of the eponymous Agent X in a multi-load game made up of a number of sub-games. It was followed by a sequel, Agent X II: The Mad Prof's Back.

== Plot ==
The President has been kidnapped by a mad professor, who has left a ransom note telling of an evil dastardly plot to brainwash the leader into a warmongering maniac. Agent X must find the professor's lab, rescue the President and take him to safety, before picking up a bomb and destroying the professor.

== Gameplay ==
Gameplay screenshot

There are four sections of the game, each loaded separately. The first level sees Agent X driving a car which travels along a diagonally scrolling road, and is under constant attack from other road users who try to ram it off the road or trap it behind obstacles. The player can make the car jump to avoid crashes. The next level is a basic fighting game; enemies approach from the left and right and must be defeated by kicking or punching them. The third level is a first-person target shooting game in which various objects are hurled towards the screen and must be shot. The final level involves the player controlling Agent X in a helicopter, avoiding missiles and crushers. The player must negotiate a cave complex using the helicopter, collect a bomb, then return it through the caves to destroy the professor's headquarters.

== Reception ==
Reception

Review scores
Publication	Score
Crash	85%
Computer and Video Games	30/40
Your Sinclair	7/10
ZX Computing	Great

Reviews were fairly positive, with CRASH giving it 85%, Your Sinclair rating it at 7/10, and ZX Computing rating it as Great.

CRASH said of the game "Wow! For £1.99 this has got so much content. The graphics are all fairly neat, but I dislike the need to continually restart and reload.", Rachael Smith from Your Sinclair said that "Agent X looks great, and has some wacky touches, such as the life indicator, which consists of a little figure moving towards a gravestone. If only they'd been used to slightly better effect this could have been a Mastertronic classic." and ZX Computing said that "... the graphics are good, the game is nicely presented, and the programmer's clearly kept his tongue well into his cheek.".
