= Druid (video game) =

1986 video game

- Developer: Electralyte Software
- Publisher: Firebird
- Designer: Dene Carter
- Programmer: Andrew E. Bailey
- Artist: Dene Carter
- Composer: David M. Hanlon
- Platforms: Amstrad CPC, Atari 8-bit, Commodore 64, ZX Spectrum, MSX2, Tatung Einstein, Famicom Disk System
- Release: 1986
- Genre: Dungeon crawl

Druid is a hack and slash dungeon crawl developed by Electralyte Software and published by Firebird in 1986 for the Atari 8-bit computers, and Commodore 64. It was also ported to Amstrad CPC, ZX Spectrum, and by Nippon Dexter in 1988 for the MSX, although the MSX port was released in Japan only. Another Japanese port of Druid entitled Druid: Kyōfu no Tobira (ドルイド 恐怖の扉) was made for the Famicom Disk System by Jaleco in 1988. The game was followed by Druid II: Enlightenment and Warlock: The Avenger.

== Gameplay ==
C64 screenshot

Reception

Award
Publication	Award
Amstrad Action	Mastergame

Inspired by the arcade game Gauntlet, Druid is a fantasy-themed dungeon crawl where the player plays the part of Hasrinaxx, a druid who is trying to rid the world of the dark mage Acamantor and his army of demons. To do this, Hasrinaxx must travel through several levels.

The first level is a normal landscape, and the ones after that are underground, each one deeper than the previous. Each level is infested with various enemies such as ghosts, giant insects, witches, and the four demon princes. Hasrinaxx can shoot these enemies with three different weapons: water, fire, and electricity, but they all come in a finite supply and are not equally effective on all enemies. Using a Chaos spell will destroy all enemies in the player's vicinity as well as replenish energy. The four demon princes can only be defeated with a Chaos spell; common weapons are ineffective against them.

Hasrinaxx can also summon a golem to help him or turn invisible for a brief period. In both Atari 8-bit and Commodore 64 versions, a second player can take control of the golem using joystick port 2.
