= Mr. Mephisto =

1984 video game

- Developer(s): Euro-Byte
- Publisher(s): Euro-Byte
- Designer(s): Dave Lucas
- Artist(s): Graham Hunt
- Platform(s): Commodore 64, BBC Micro
- Release: 1984: C64; 1986: BBC
- Genre(s): Action
- Mode(s): Single-player

Mr. Mephisto is a video game written for the Commodore 64 by Dave Lucas and published by Euro-Byte in 1984. The graphics are by Graham Hunt. A port to the BBC Micro followed in 1986.

== Gameplay ==
The game consists of a number of levels through which the player navigates to collect rings and make it safely to an exit. A team of demons attempt to block the player's path. Contact with a demon results in instant death, and one or more scrolling staircases further hamper the player's progress.

== Ports ==
Following success in the C64 market, Euro-Byte commissioned a port of the game to the BBC Micro. However, no source code was available as the game had been coded in 6502 assembler directly into the C64's monitor program. The game was re-written from scratch. Euro-Byte subsequently commissioned a version for the Acorn Electron, but this was never released.
