= Mad Nurse =

1984 video game

- Cover art
- Publisher: Firebird Software Ltd.
- Designer: Simon Pick
- Platforms: Commodore 64, ZX Spectrum
- Release: 1984
- Genre: Platformer
- Mode: Single-player

Mad Nurse is a video game programmed by Simon Pick and published by Firebird Software Ltd. for the Commodore 64 and ZX Spectrum in 1984.

== Gameplay ==
The player controls a nurse overseeing three floors of a children's ward, moving between them via a lift to pick up babies who crawl out of their cots and return them before they can drink medicine, touch power points, or fall down lift shafts; the player manages three trainee nurses who can each sustain three mishaps, uses stun‑gas to subdue unruly children, and navigates rooms whose furniture layouts change each game.

== Development ==
Mad Nurse had a budget of £650. Firebird initially refused to publish the game, because dying babies were too controversial, but changed their minds when their post of head of development changed hands. Some outlets also refused to sell the game. Firebird released a package that included Mad Nurse and Olli & Lissa in fall 1987.

The music in the game is adopted from Hungarian Rhapsody No. 2 by Franz Liszt (the friska in the second section) and Brahms' Lullaby by Johannes Brahms.

== Reception ==
Reception

Review scores
| Publication | Score |
|---|---|
| Crash | 31% |
| Computer Gamer | 74% |
| Zzap!64 | 32% |

Crash called Mad Nurse a dull game covered up with a few neat graphics.
