= The Magnetic Scrolls Collection =

- Developer: Magnetic Scrolls
- Publisher: Virgin Games, Inc.
- Platforms: Acorn 32-bit, Amiga, Atari ST, DOS
- Release: 1991
- Genre: Adventure

The Magnetic Scrolls Collection is a 1991 video game published by Virgin Games, Inc.

== Contents ==
The Magnetic Scrolls Collection is a collection of three text adventure games, The Guild of Thieves, Corruption, and Fish!. The game system for each game is based on windows. Players are able to make moves using the options of moving icons, clicking on menus of key commands, or typing commands in. The collection comes packaged with a fish chart for Fish!, a map for Guild of Thieves, and a calendar and audio cassette for Corruption. The box includes four disks.

The three games in this collection have been modified to use Magnetic Windows, the Windows interpreter previously used in Wonderland. The games were originally text adventures, with still or minimally animated images of locations, and the collection adds windows and icons for elements such as mapping, inventory, and discovering items that can be manipulated. The player can use the windows interface to arrange the game screen to suit their preference, and can play the games as pure text adventures or as graphic adventures.

== Development and release ==
The Magnetic Scrolls company held a competition in 1992 to give a free copy of the collection to anyone who could tell the scientific name for a person addicted to stealing.

The company had planned to release at least two volumes of the collection. However, the cost of developing the Magnetic Windows interpreter in the waning interactive fiction market led to the company going out of business before a second volume could be released.

== Reception ==
Reception

Review scores
Publication	Score
Amiga Power	80%
ST Format	81%

Charles Ardai reviewed the game for Computer Gaming World, and stated that "People who love old-fashioned adventures will probably enjoy all three. People who value unusual, exceptional games will love Corruption. The irony is that people will probably pick up the Collection because of Guild of Thieves, but will be glad they did because of Corruption. Fish! is the odd man out, neither popular nor good; it is the one of the three which will be left (you'll pardon the expression) to flounder."

James Leach for ST Format described the collection as "Smooth, pretty fast and with an excellent windows game-system", declaring that "these three adventures are going to delight fans of the genre", complimenting the graphics and programming.

Sean Masterson for Amiga Power said that the "Interesting and useable new display system gives two classic adventures (and one okayish one) a new lease on life."

Matt Regan for PC Review gave the collection 7 out of 10 stars and said that "The Magnetic Scrolls Collection Volume 1 offers three well written adventures, otherwise virtually unobtainable except via mail-order, at a good price and with a very flexible interface."

ACE gave the game 4 stars out of 5 and said that "players will [...] find far more entertainment than in any other game system. Worthwhile."

The reviewer for the Telegraph & Argus revealed that "I have been pitting my wits against the Guild of Thieves for a fortnight now and have managed to score a modest 100 out of the 500 available points."
