= Throne of Fire =

1987 video game

- Amstrad CPC cover art
- Developer: Consult Computer Systems
- Publisher: Melbourne House
- Designer: Mike Singleton
- Programmer: Jim Bagley
- Platforms: Amstrad CPC, ZX Spectrum
- Release: April 1987
- Genres: Action, strategy
- Modes: Single-player, multiplayer

Throne of Fire is an action strategy video game. It was designed by Mike Singleton, developed by Consult Computer Systems, and published by Melbourne House. The game was released for the Amstrad CPC and ZX Spectrum in 1987. Throne of Fire is set in the Burning Citadel, located around the rim of a volcano.

The game focuses on three princes in the Burning Citadel where they and their men-at-arms fight to the death to gain the Throne of Fire after their father's death. Throne of Fire received positive reviews from industry critics, with some reviewers speaking positively of the graphics while others criticized the lack of difficulty in the single-player mode, instead recommending playing with two players.

== Gameplay ==
Gameplay of Throne of Fire, split-screened with the first player as Karag and the second as Cordrin. The second player is seen in combat against the King's Guard.

Throne of Fire is an action strategy game. Set in the Burning Citadel, located around the rim of a volcano, the player assumes the role of one of the three princes of the recently deceased King Atherik: Alorn the Lion Prince, Cordrin the Sun Prince, and Karag the Wolf Prince. As one of the princes, the player can play against two computer players or a second player and a computer player, who play the role of the other two princes. Each prince and their men-at-arms must fight the other princes and their army to the death. The player must also fight against the King's Guard, the protectors of the Throne of Fire. Weapons with their own strengths and weaknesses can be found around the castle, along with magical objects that can increase or decrease a character's strength.

Each army group are distinguished by color, with Prince Alorn and his men as red, Cordrin as yellow, Karag as purple, and the King's Guard as green. The castle has one hundred rooms to enter through. If any characters enter a room, their group color will light up the room. Each of the princes starts with nine men-at-arms. Reinforcements will join the side of whoever last visited Gate Rooms. If no one entered a Gate Room before the man-at-arms appears, they will join the King's Guard.

Once the player enters the Throne Room with their prince, they become the king and take control of the King's Guard. The other players lose the ability to control their men-at-arms, with their men staying in their rooms to defend themselves. If the new king dies, the King's Guard will return to being neutral and the other princes regain their men.

== Development ==
Throne of Fire was designed by Mike Singleton, known for designing other fantasy games such as Lords of Midnight, Doomdark's Revenge, and Dark Sceptre. It was developed under Consult Computer Systems, who worked on the programming, graphics, and music and was published by Melbourne House. This was the first game Singleton made in association with Melbourne House. Jim Bagley was given the position of programmer for the game, the first game he ever worked on. The game was released in April 1987 on the Amstrad CPC and ZX Spectrum. A Commodore 64 port was also planned, but was never released, as development had taken longer than expected and sales on other formats were lower than hoped, so Melbourne House cancelled it.

== Reception ==
Reception

Review scores
Publication	Score
Crash	75%
Computer and Video Games	7/10
Sinclair User	3/5
Your Sinclair	8/10
Computer Gamer	54%

Throne of Fire received positive reviews from video game critics, mostly for the ZX Spectrum version. Tim Metcalfe from Computer and Video Games said that Throne of Fire wouldn't be for everyone but recommended it to fans of strategy games who would find it to be an "absorbing challenge." Tony from Your Sinclair praised its gameplay and its animation, describing it as "superb". ZX Computing Monthly also spoke positively of the game's graphics, though he also stated that it lacked the challenge when compared to Mike Singleton's The Lords of Midnight series. The Amstrad version of Throne of Fire was given a positive review by the German publication Aktueller Software Markt.

Ben Stone, Paul Sumner, and Ricky Eddy from Crash were more critical of the gameplay, as they considered the game to be too easy to play in single-player, with all three recommending the two-player mode. Stone added that the lack of difficulty spoiled the gameplay. Eddy also criticized the game for lacking the compulsion and depth Mike Singleton's other games had. Judy Daniel from Sinclair User called the gameplay "dodgy" and thought it was not one of Singleton's best games. A reviewer for Computer Gamer was more negative towards the game. While saying that the game had interesting ideas in it, they did not think that the ideas worked together. Computer Gamer also called the action on screen confusing and considered the game to be "tedious" overall.
