= Jinxter =

1987 video game

- MS-DOS cover art
- Developer: Magnetic Scrolls
- Publisher: Rainbird Software
- Programmer: Paul Findley
- Artists: Geoff Quilley; Duncan McLean
- Writers: Georgina Sinclair; Michael Bywater
- Composer: John Molloy
- Platforms: Amiga; Amstrad CPC; Amstrad PCW; Apple II; Archimedes; Atari 8-bit; Atari ST; Commodore 64; Mac; MS-DOS; ZX Spectrum
- Release: 1987
- Genre: Interactive fiction
- Mode: Single-player

Jinxter is an interactive fiction video game developed by Magnetic Scrolls and published by Rainbird in 1987 for 8-bit and 16-bit home computers of the time. Jinxter tells the story of a man on a mission to save the fictional land of Aquitania from the looming threat of evil witches. The game was well received by critics upon its release.

== Gameplay ==
Atari ST gameplay screenshot, showing one of the game's "more eye-catching scenes"

Jinxter is a text-based adventure, where the player controls the protagonist character by typing in command sentences. Most versions use graphics for illustrations, with the exception of the text-only Spectrum +3 and Apple II versions. It was famous for its quirky, eccentric humour, as many of the textual descriptions are very long and have an amusing aspect. Each of the five charms provides a magic spell, and the words to trigger these spells are common placeholder names. Unlike many other text adventures, in Jinxter the player character almost never dies during the course of gameplay (the only exception to this rule is at the game's final confrontation). However, the player can lose some luck and be unable to complete the game later on.

== Plot ==
The game is a science fantasy comedy set in the fictional country of Aquitania, which bears a strong resemblance to early-to-middle 20th century Britain. The main characters in the story are the Guardians, immortal guardian angel-like beings who look after and help people. The Guardians, who are members of ARSE, the Association of Registered Stochastic Executives, are described as liking to wear herringbone overcoats and eat cheese sandwiches. Centuries ago, the country was threatened by the rising dark power of the wicked Green Witches until the good magician Turani created a magical object, called the Bracelet, which holds luck and distributes it throughout Aquitania to limit and keep in check the witches' magic, banning the dangerous parts of the witchcraft and rendering them relatively harmless. However, the new high witch Jannedor has enough of the restraints. She has obtained and disassembled the Bracelet, stripped it of its five magical charms and hid them in various places (the bracelet itself is worn by Jannedor), waiting for its powers to be weakened enough so that it can be destroyed and enable her to fulfill her schemes of jinx and conquest. If the charms of Turani are not reunited soon with the legendary Bracelet of Turani then luck could completely run out and the witches will regain all of their old magic and the country will again fall under their influence.

The player character is, pretty much accidentally, recruited by the Guardians to rescue his kidnapped friend Xam, retrieve the charms, fix the Bracelet, and then use its powers against Jannedor to kill her and destroy her castle, thus defeating the witches and restoring luck to Aquitania. Once Jannedor's evil ambitions are put to an end, however, the player's character is placed back just where he was before he began his adventure—in front of a speeding bus—and is killed.

== Development ==
Jinxter was originally conceived as an answer to Infocom's Enchanter and was created by a relatively large development team. The game was originally written by the sister of Magnetic Scrolls' founder Anita Sinclair, Georgina, who had previously written the novella A Tale of Kerovnia for The Pawn. However, due to a falling out between them, the whole text had to be rewritten in three weeks by Michael Bywater, who had previously written the What Burglar magazine for The Guild of Thieves and then helped with Corruption. The game's package contents included The Independent Guardian newspaper written by Bywater.

== Reception ==
Reception

Review scores
Publication	Score
Amstrad Action	88%
Crash	92%
Computer and Video Games	37/40
Your Sinclair	9/10
Zzap!64	83%

Awards
Publication	Award
Crash	Crash Smash
Sinclair User	SU Classic
Your Sinclair	Megagame

Jinxter received positive reviews, including the rating scores of 70% from Amiga Computing, 7/10 from Amiga User International, 88% from Amstrad Action, 8/10 from Power Play, 9/10 from Commodore User, 37/40 from Computer and Video Games, 89% from Computing with the Amstrad, 92% from Crash, 92% from The Games Machine 9/10 in Your Sinclair, and 83% from Zzap!64. The game was also a commercial success. In 1998, ACE featured it on the list of 100 Top Games as "an odd adventure decorated with beautiful graphics." However, in 1996, Computer Gaming World ranked its ending as the 14th least rewarding of all time, as "even when the player won, the protagonist died." Markku Alanen in C=lehti gave four out of five stars calling Jinxter a relatively fine game in its own genre, but complained that the game did not use Amiga's graphical capabilities well and the parser didn't offer much new. He also doubted that game's deeply British humor may leave many Finnish players cold.
