= Astaroth: The Angel of Death =

1989 video game

- Developer: Eldritch the Cat
- Publisher: Hewson Consultants
- Designer: Marc Dawson
- Artist: Pete Lyon
- Platforms: Amiga, Atari ST
- Release: UK: 1989
- Genre: Action
- Mode: Single-player

Astaroth: The Angel of Death is a 1989 action-platformer video game developed by Eldritch the Cat and published by Hewson Consultants for the Amiga and Atari ST. The game is a mythology-themed dungeon crawler. Players navigate a labyrinth and locate magical powers to gain abilities to defeat the titular villain and other enemies. Astaroth was designed by Marc Dawson, who had previously developed games for Odin Computer Graphics. Upon release, the game received average reviews, with praise directed towards its inclusion of magical abilities, and criticism towards its unoriginality and difficulty.

== Gameplay ==
Gameplay in the Atari ST version of Astaroth.

As Ozymandias, the objective of the game is to enter the dungeons of a she-devil named Astaroth, fight enemies and defeat her as the final boss. During gameplay, players encounter additional bosses: three mythological guardians including the Hydra, Sphinx and the demon Marilith. Players navigate the dungeon as an interconnected series of static screens that can be entered from left, right, top or bottom. Initially, the player lacks combat abilities, and must duck or avoid enemies, losing five "mind powers" which represent lives lost; when all are depleted, the game is over. To progress, the player must collect nine "mind strengths" found in jars throughout the dungeon, which provide the player with additional offensive and defensive abilities, including levitation, telekinesis, pyrotechnics, telepathy, transfiguration, night vision and freezing.

== Development ==
Astaroth was created by studio Eldritch the Cat, including designer Marc Dawson and graphics designed by artist Pete Lyon. The game was the first created by Dawson for Abingdon based publisher Hewson Consultants, and he had previously worked on games including Robin of the Wood and Nodes of Yesod for other companies including Odin Computer Graphics. Dawson conceived of the game's titular feminine villain after reading the Stephen King book Carrie. Hewson approached Dawson seeking his involvement at a Personal Computer World trade show in 1987, and he was contracted to begin work on the game in the spring of 1988, which took over a year due to programming problems. The game was the first 16-bit title released by Hewson for the Amiga and Atari ST alongside Roadstar XRi. Astaroth was advertised with a nude illustration of a harpy illustrated by Steve Weston, later used in the game's main menu and manual, although upon release its box art was censored and replaced with a different cover.

== Reception ==
Reception

Review scores
Publication	Score	
Publication	Amiga	Atari ST
Amiga Format	41%	
Amiga User International	8/10	
ST Action		61%
ST Format		72%
The Games Machine (UK)	83%	84%
CU Amiga	71%	
New Computer Express		1/5

Astaroth received average reviews, with critics highlighting the game's challenge and visual presentation. ST Action felt the game was a "fine example" of a dungeon crawler on the Atari ST, highlighting its variety of powers, "eerie" atmosphere and soundtrack, although they found the game "unforgiving" and "plain frustrating to complete". Gary Barrett of ST Format felt the game yielded "plenty of enjoyment", although players would need to overcome the "frustration" of the game's initial difficulty. Describing Astaroth as a "tough game to play", The Games Machine felt it featured "terrific" graphics and was "well-programmed", but they were split on whether the game was original enough to be successful.

Negative reviews of Astaroth criticised the game's unoriginality. Rik Haynes of the New Computer Express stated that the game was unimpressive with "nothing outstanding visually" due to the "chronically small sprites", and suffering from a "lack of originality". Describing Astaroth as a "jaded old game concept tarted up with graphics of a sensationalist nature", Steve Jarratt of Amiga Format considered the game's art to be unoriginal and tasteless, the gameplay "not impressive" due to poor collision detection and movement, and the soundtrack "pleasant" but "too upbeat".
