= Heartland (video game) =

1986 video game

- Developer: Odin Computer Graphics
- Publisher: Odin Computer Graphics
- Designers: Steve Wetherill; Colin Grunes
- Platforms: ZX Spectrum, Commodore 64, Amstrad CPC
- Release: 1986
- Genre: Platform
- Mode: Single-player

Heartland is a platform game for the ZX Spectrum, Amstrad CPC, and Commodore 64 released by Odin Computer Graphics in 1986.

== Plot ==
The Heartland has fallen under the rule of the ruthless tyrant Midan and his minions. To overthrow him, the final six pages of a magical book must be found and assembled, but to confuse would-be adventurers Midan has created six evil pages; these must also be destroyed.

== Gameplay ==
The game is similar to the earlier Odin titles Nodes of Yesod and Arc of Yesod. The player must locate the six magical pages and also destroy the six dark pages. Various spells may be collected, including a magical hat which may be thrown to kill enemies. Knives and fireballs can also be used to attack enemies. Contact with enemies will cause the player to lose energy; as he grows weaker the face of Midan gradually appears at the top of the screen.

== Reception ==
Reception

Review scores
Publication	Score
Amtix	93%
Crash	92%
Computer and Video Games	32/40
Sinclair User	5/5
Your Sinclair	9/10
Zzap!64	85%

Awards
Publication	Award
Crash	Crash Smash
Sinclair User	SU Classic
Your Sinclair	Megagame

Sinclair User wrote: "Stunning to look at, delightful to play, HEARTLAND is magical and stylish. Simple without being simple-minded" Crash reviewed the game stating: "This is a very nice game. The graphics are fabulous, and the animation is really rather neat and the game itself is very attractively designed. Playability-wise, Heartland is very good indeed, and it's also addictive. Lots of things combine to make this one of the better games on the Spectrum".

Zzap!64's reviewers complimented the game's graphics and playability and said it was "another high quality arcade adventure from Odin".
