= Ashes of Empire =

1992 video game

Ashes of Empire (video game)
- Developer(s): Mirage
- Publisher(s): Midnight Technologies LTD 1990
- Director(s): Iain Symon
- Programmer(s): Mike Singleton, Hugh Batterbury, Dave Gautrey, George Williamson, Dave Ollman, Andy Elkerton, Stuart Flint, Harvey Stroud, Val Franco, Chris Rowly
- Platform(s): Amiga, MS-DOS
- Release: 1992
- Genre(s): Strategy
- Mode(s): Single-player

Ashes of Empire is a 1992 strategy video game developed by Mirage, released for the Amiga and MS-DOS compatible operating systems. It was a follow-on, although not a sequel, to the earlier games Midwinter and Flames of Freedom.

== Gameplay ==
The player is a member of a fictional UN/NATO-type organisation (CSR) to recruit followers across various CIS-inspired republics being threatened by a powerful neighbor. The mechanics of the game are similar to the earlier Midwinter game, although the player is able to use a selection of land and air vehicles to travel around. Combat is real-time, with the player maneuvering to engage the enemy vehicle(s). The overall aim of the game is to pacify each of the CSR's five Republics - Ossia, Ruzakhstan, Belokraine, Moldenia and Servonia.

From the preface by Mike Singleton: "In Ashes of Empire, you well find echoes of the real world and, I hope, echoes of how delicate a task it is to bring peace and prosperity to lands where there is, at the moment, only hardship, bloodletting and misery".

== Reception ==
The game was reasonably well-received but not commercially successful, mainly due to the dry nature of the subject matter and the level of detail included in the game.

Computer Gaming World in 1993 stated that Ashes of Empire was a logistical game that "truly breaks new ground" but "reveals major weaknesses", with game-play that was "plodding and devoid of any intense challenge". The magazine approved of, however, the "truly fresh gaming experience" and "interactive education and thought puzzle which is highly topical in today's changing world", and concluded that "this type of game needs several generations of development [as a viable genre] ... It's about time, though, that a games like Ashes of Empire took the first, important step".
