= The Plot (video game) =

1988 video game

- Developer: Odin Computer Graphics
- Publisher: Firebird Software
- Platforms: ZX Spectrum, Amstrad CPC
- Release: 1988
- Genre: Platform
- Mode: Single-player

The Plot is a video game developed by Odin Computer Graphics and published by Firebird Software in 1988 for the Amstrad CPC and ZX Spectrum. It was the last game released by Odin.

== Overview ==
The Plot is a 2D flip-screen platformer. It is a parody of the Gunpowder Plot of 1605, with the player taking the role of Guy Fawkes in his attempt to blow up the English Houses of Parliament. He must search the vaults beneath Parliament, collecting sticks of dynamite to prepare the bomb. Fireworks can also be collected for points and special functions. When enough sticks of dynamite have been collected, the special firework must be taken to the start screen and lit to complete the game.

== Reception ==
- Your Sinclair:
  I don't take too kindly to the plot of The Plot. The object is to help Guy Fawkes blow up the Houses of Parliament, no less... A terrorist computer game? I think so! Anyway, the program itself is less controversial. This is a fairly straightforward but quite enjoyable platform and ladders game, a la Monty Mole. It's programmed by Odin, and as you would expect, graphics and gameplay are highly polished... a tough challenge ... worthwhile buy for hardened platform freaks.
