= Sidewize =

1987 video game

- Developer: Odin Computer Graphics
- Publisher: Firebird Software
- Designers: Steve Wetherill; Colin Grunes
- Platforms: Commodore 64, ZX Spectrum
- Release: 1987
- Genre: Scrolling shooter
- Modes: Single-player, multiplayer

Sidewize is a horizontally scrolling shooter released by Firebird in 1987 for the Commodore 64 and ZX Spectrum home computers. It was followed by a sequel, Crosswize.

== Plot ==
The four worlds of Omicron, Nu, Delta and Iota are under siege by the Dariard Mutants. The Warriors of the Xeolom Alliance are all that stand between the Mutants and victory.

== Gameplay ==
Sidewize is a 2D horizontally scrolling shooter with similarities to the Capcom arcade game Side Arms. The player controls the warrior Dynar on his lone mission against waves of Mutants on the four worlds of the Xeolom Alliance. Dynar is equipped with an armored suit with a jetpack and an array of weapons. Power-ups may be collected for improved mobility, weapons and firepower.

The four Xeolom worlds may be played in any order, but must all be completed before the player moves on to the alien world of Zeta, where the final Mutant boss awaits.

== Development ==
Sidewize was developed by Odin Computer Graphics.

== Reception ==
Reception

Review scores
Publication	Score
Crash	50%
Computer and Video Games	29/30
Sinclair User	10/10
Your Sinclair	9/10

Awards
Publication	Award
Sinclair User	SU Classic
Your Sinclair	Megagame

- Your Sinclair:
  "The game itself is a simple concept, but there's just so much to it, and the difficulty is so well judged, you just can't pull the plug. It's fast. The action is flicker-free. The monochrome graphics are great and the sound effects set it all off. It could take years of careful manoeuvre to beat this one, unless you're into hacking..."
