= Timur Göksel =

Turkish diplomat who served with the UN Interim Force in Lebanon (1943–2021)

Timur Göksel (3 May 1943 – 2 February 2021) was a Turkish diplomat who served as Spokesman and Senior Advisor to the United Nations Interim Force in Lebanon (UNIFIL) from 1978 to 2003. Göksel started his 35-year career with the United Nations (UN) in 1968 as an Information Assistant in the Ankara Information Office. Ten years later, he was posted to UNIFIL in Naqoura, Lebanon, where he remained in service until his retirement in 2003.

During his time with UNIFIL, Göksel was instrumental in establishing communication and trust among various conflicting parties in southern Lebanon, including Israeli and Lebanese forces, as well as local communities and militias. In 1996, British journalist Michael Bywater wrote, "Choking on hatred and confusion as old as the grave, no one in that deadly buffer of stony soil between Israel and Lebanon trusted anyone else," but Göksel "ran a bullshit-free zone." He earned a wide reputation for being an expert peacekeeper and mediator. Journalist Robert Fisk once described him as "perhaps the most powerful man in southern Lebanon" due to his ability to negotiate with leaders on all sides during the volatile 1990s.

== Early life ==
Göksel was born on May 3, 1943 in Ankara, Turkey and spent his early childhood there. He spent part of his teenage years in Washington, DC, where his father served as the Air Attaché at the Turkish Embassy. He completed high school in Ankara and earned his bachelors in public administration and international relations at the Middle East Technical University.

== Career ==
Göksel spent the majority of his decades-long career in peacekeeping and security with the United Nations Interim Force in Lebanon (UNIFIL). He began his career with the UN in 1968 as an Information Assistant at the Ankara Information Office. After completing his compulsory service in the Turkish army from 1973 to 1975, he returned to Ankara to set up an independent UN Information Office at the request of the Turkish government. He managed the office from 1975 to 1979.

Göksel became a political adviser to UNIFIL after its establishment in 1978. He joined UNIFIL six months later as its press officer and spokesman, and remained with the mission for the next twenty-four years. His tenure spanned a period of significant historical and geopolitical events in the region—“years that saw not only Israel’s invasion and two major incursions, but also the height of PLO power and its obliteration, the birth and development of the local resistance after 1982, the waning of the powerful Amal movement and the rise of Hizballah.”

In 1995, he was appointed Senior Adviser to UNIFIL in addition to his role as Spokesman (1995–2003). During his time with UNIFIL, he was described as potentially the most powerful man in southern Lebanon, being the only individual capable of directly contacting both Gabi Ashkenazi, the Israeli northern front commander, and Sayed Hassan Nasrallah, chairman of Hezbollah, within minutes. “Because of Göksel’s long association with the interim force (where individual tours of duty rarely exceeded a few years), his familiarity with every village and hamlet south of the Litani, and his personal acquaintance with all the leading players, he has frequently been referred to as "Mr. UNIFIL" or "Mr. South Lebanon.""

In addition to Göksel's work at UNIFIL, he conducted lectures, seminars, and workshops for diplomats and military officials on public information, communication policies in peacekeeping, theory and practice of peacekeeping, and international organizations. Although Göksel only signed on to be with UNIFIL for six months, he stayed with the peacekeeping mission for 24 years. His long-standing role in UNIFIL allowed him to witness firsthand the complex and evolving dynamics of power and resistance in the region.

Following his retirement from the UN in 2003, Göksel remained in Beirut and lectured widely on conflict resolution and peacekeeping techniques at various universities in Beirut, including the American University of Beirut, where he was a graduate-level lecturer in Conflict Management in the Middle East. From 2012 to 2020, he remained in Beirut, becoming a founding editor of Al-Monitor’s coverage of events in Turkey.
