= Crosswize =

1988 shooter video game

- Publisher: Firebird Software
- Designers: Colin Grunes; Steve Wetherill
- Platform: ZX Spectrum
- Release: 1988
- Genre: Shoot 'em up
- Modes: Single-player, multiplayer

Crosswize is a shoot 'em up released by Firebird in 1988 for the ZX Spectrum home computer and is the sequel to Sidewize.

== Plot ==
The planet Luna is under attack by Mutants and must be defended.

== Overview ==
The game is similar to its predecessor, with a lone warrior battling waves of alien enemies. A notable difference is the ability to fire in both directions, as in Side Arms. Again, power-ups may be collected for improved weapons and firepower.

== Development ==
Crosswize was published by Firebird Software. A sequel to Sidewize, it was programmed by Steve Wetherill and Colin Grunes, who designed the previous game.

== Reception ==
Reception

Review scores
Publication	Score
Crash	69%
Computer and Video Games	27/40
Sinclair User	10/10
Your Sinclair	9/10

Awards
Publication	Award
Sinclair User	SU Classic
Your Sinclair	Megagame

- Your Sinclair:
  "Addictiveness? Is this game addictive? We are talking fail your exams, lose your job, break up your marriage, and even don't wash your hair-type addictiveness. You keep pounding the joystick, trying to get past that building to see what will kill you next. Have another go, and another, just one more, and another, one more time..."
- Sinclair User: "A terrific shoot-em-up and classic blast. Violent escapism at its best".
