= Magnetic Scrolls =

British video game developer

- Industry: Software video game developer
- Founded: 1984
- Founder: Anita Sinclair; Ken Gordon; Hugh Steers
- Defunct: 1992
- Headquarters: London

Magnetic Scrolls was a British video game developer active between 1984 and 1990. A pioneer of audiovisually elaborate text adventure games, it was among the largest and most acclaimed interactive fiction developers of the 1980s, and one of the "Big Two" with Infocom according to some.

The company's games were known for their complex puzzles, intricate storylines, and immersive gameplay. Games developed by Magnetic Scrolls include The Pawn, The Guild of Thieves, and Jinxter.

== History ==
=== Formation ===
Formed by Anita Sinclair, Ken Gordon and Hugh Steers in 1984, London-based Magnetic Scrolls initially dabbled with development on the Sinclair QL home computer before deciding to take advantage of the emerging Atari ST and Amiga gaming platforms. Having secured a publication deal with Rainbird, a British software label owned by Telecomsoft, they began work producing an ambitious text adventure game that would become The Pawn.

During the mid-1980s, the text adventure market was thriving, although only a few developers exclusively specialised in the genre. The undisputed giants of the genre were Infocom, based in Cambridge, Massachusetts, that practically redefined the genre by ensuring the interface (or text parser) never provided a barrier between the player and the fictional elements of the game.

Infocom's dominance of the text adventure market ensured they had very few rivals in the United States. Adventure International, owned by Scott and Lexis Adams, had been an early competitor of Infocom, but they went out of business long before Infocom had hit their stride. Their only other serious competitor was Sierra On-Line, owned by Ken and Roberta Williams, who specialised in graphical adventure games.

During the early to mid-1980s, Level 9 Computing dominated the UK text adventure market. Delta 4 and CRL also produced a number of text adventures that were critical and commercial hits, but were never a serious rival to Level 9. Until they were acquired by Activision in 1985, Infocom's titles were something of a rarity in the UK, only typically available as expensive imports. Magnetic Scrolls immediately took advantage of this considerable gap in the UK market with their first release, The Pawn.

=== Early releases ===
The Pawn, written by Rob Steggles, was released in 1985, on a wide range of 8-bit and 16-bit platforms, to substantial acclaim. One of the biggest selling points, besides the advanced text parser, engrossing story and exquisite packaging, were the high resolution illustrations that accompanied many of the game's locations. Although outdated by today's standards, they were considered state-of-the-art at the time. The ZX Spectrum version did not include graphics.

In 1987, Magnetic Scrolls released two new games. Steggles returned to write The Guild of Thieves, a traditional treasure hunt, while Georgina Sinclair and Michael Bywater wrote the contemporary fantasy of Jinxter. Both games were met with similar critical acclaim as The Pawn.

For their next release, Corruption (1988), Magnetic Scrolls decided to experiment with the boundaries of interactive fiction. Written by Rob Steggles, with the help of Hugh Steers, the game was a contemporary thriller that explored corporate corruption and greed. Corruption abandoned the traditional puzzle-solving, treasure-hunting gameplay of many text adventure games, requiring the player to progress by conversing with characters, collecting evidence and working against the clock in order to complete the game. The game came packaged with a cassette tape containing a series of audio conversations. The player would be prompted to play them at specific points during the story, adding an extra layer of depth to the game.

Released towards the end of 1988 was Fish!, a more light-hearted, surreal adventure game, where the player assumed the role of a dimension-jumping goldfish. Written by John Molloy, Pete Kemp, Phil South and edited by Rob Steggles, Fish! would prove to be the last of Magnetic Scrolls' traditional commercial releases.

Myth was released in 1989 through Official Secrets, an adventure gaming club set up by Tony Rainbird after he (and Magnetic Scrolls) parted ways with Telecomsoft. Now based in Hertfordshire, Magnetic Scrolls produced this mini-adventure as a freebie that would be given away to those who signed up to join Official Secrets. However, the gaming club did not last long and was quickly assimilated into Tony Rainbird's new Special Reserve company, specialising in mail order computer hardware and software.

=== Later years and demise ===
Wonderland had been in development at Magnetic Scrolls for some time and was finally released by Virgin Mastertronic in 1990. Magnetic Scrolls had devised a brand new interface, christened Magnetic Windows, to take advantage of the Amiga and Atari ST's advanced capabilities. Incorporating auto-mapping, icons, help functions and separate, resizable windows for graphics and text, Wonderland, written by David Bishop and based on the works of Lewis Carroll, was a deliberate attempt to push the text adventure in a new, hi-tech direction. However, by the time the new interface was ready, the traditional text-based genre had already started to die out as gamers craved more visually elaborate gaming experiences.

In 1988, Magnetic Scrolls began to collaborate with Infocom, Douglas Adams and Michael Bywater on a sequel to The Hitchhiker's Guide to the Galaxy, but the project was never finished. A playable draft of an early part of the game, along with the personal and commercial circumstances behind its development, briefly came to public attention twenty years later.

In 1991, Virgin Interactive released The Magnetic Scrolls Collection Vol 1, containing new versions of The Guild of Thieves, Corruption and Fish! that took advantage of the Magnetic Windows engine. A second collection, containing their remaining games, was planned, but never completed.

As a consequence of the dying text adventure market, Magnetic Scrolls ceased publishing in 1992. They were acquired by MicroProse later that year. A number of Magnetic Scrolls' staff went on to help develop a 3D role-playing video game entitled The Legacy: Realm of Terror, which was released on the PC to mediocre reviews, but MicroProse did not capitalise on the Magnetic Scrolls name beyond that. In the late 1990s, Ken Gordon registered the magneticscrolls.com domain, which now redirects to the Strand Games website.

Two programmers from Magnetic Scrolls, Doug Rabson and Servan Keondjian, later formed the company RenderMorphics which produced the highly acclaimed 3D Graphics API Reality Lab. In January 1995, another Magnetic Scrolls programmer, Steve Lacey, joined RenderMorphics and in February of the same year, Microsoft acquired the company. Reality Lab became the basis for Direct3D. Rabson and Keondjian are now at Qube Software, which they co-founded with Hugh Steers. Lacey remained at Microsoft as the graphics engine lead on Microsoft Flight Simulator. In October 2006, Lacey moved to Google. In 2011, he was killed in a car accident.

John Molloy moved to Florida and continued to work on web-based applications. He died in 2018 following an illness. Phil South lives in Wales and after many years working Disney Channel UK's web presence worked at the Bristol Old Vic Theatre School for 7 years. He now works as a freelance writer and blogger and in 2022 published a novel under a pseudonym.

Anita Sinclair is now one of the UK's most successful bridge players, winning a number of domestic competitions, and earning a gold medal in China.

=== Reappearance ===
In May 2017, the Strand games initiative emerged. Strand Games was started by Hugh Steers — co-founder and core developer of Magnetic Scrolls — and Stefan Meier of the Magnetic Scrolls Memorial fanpage. It is supported by several members of the original Magnetic Scrolls team, including Anita Sinclair, Ken Gordon, Rob Steggles and Servan Keondjian. The non-profit initiative aims both to preserve the original works of Magnetic Scrolls and to remaster the games for modern devices. With the public appearance of the initiative, a first beta version of the remastered classic The Pawn was released. The official release followed in June 2017.

In June 2017, Strand games worked on recovering the source code of their classics from tapes to remaster and re-release them. After the successful recovery of the source code in a remarkable process, which involved baking the original backup tapes at low temperature in a kitchen oven, the initiative started to remaster The Guild of Thieves. In December 2017, the remastered and enhanced game was published. This was followed by a similarly revived edition of Jinxter in 2019.

== List of games ==
- The Pawn (1985, Rainbird)
- The Guild of Thieves (1987, Rainbird)
- Jinxter (1987, Rainbird)
- Corruption (1988, Rainbird)
- Fish! (1988, Rainbird)
- Myth (1989, Rainbird)
- Wonderland (1990, Virgin Interactive)
- The Magnetic Scrolls Collection Vol 1 (1991, Virgin Interactive)
- The Legacy: Realm of Terror (1992, MicroProse)
