= Odin Computer Graphics =

British video game developer

- Industry: Video games
- Founded: 1985; 41 years ago
- Founders: Mark Butler; Paul McKenna
- Defunct: 1987; 39 years ago
- Headquarters: Liverpool, United Kingdom
- Area served: United Kingdom
- Key people: Paul McKenna
- Products: Computer games

Odin Computer Graphics was a Liverpool-based computer games developer that came to prominence in the mid-1980s with a variety of titles for the ZX Spectrum, Commodore 64 and Amstrad CPC home computers.

== History ==
Odin was started by Paul McKenna and Mark Butler in 1984 as Thor which released several titles including Jack and the Beanstalk which reached number 2 in the ZX Spectrum charts in August 1984. Butler left Thor in early 1985, and McKenna (managing director and owner) thought it appropriate to form a sister company, Odin Computer Graphics although the Thor name would still be used on later titles such as The Arc of Yesod and I.C.U.P.S.

The new company consisted of Managing Director Paul McKenna; programmers Steve Wetherill, Robbie Tinman, Marc Dawson (now Wilding), Keith Robinson, George Barnes, Tommy Laningan, Derrick Rowson, and Stefan Walker; artists Paul Salmon, Stuart Fotheringham, and Colin Grunes; and musician Keith Tinman. Bernie Duggs and musician Fred Gray are also credited. Fotheringham and Dawson had previously worked for Software Projects. Some other staff members had previously worked for Imagine Software.

In 1986, Odin signed a publishing, marketing and distribution deal with Telecomsoft, the software division of British Telecom. While Odin's later games, like Heartland, were well received, some later titles failed to live up to expected BT standards. During this period, the warehouse area attached to the Odin studio was used by Telecomsoft as a distribution warehouse and to store thousands of copies of games on their Firebird, Rainbird and Beyond labels.

Odin made a very deliberate attempt to ensure they were mistaken for Ultimate Play the Game, one of the most critically acclaimed game developers of the 1980s. As well as establishing a very similar name (Odin Computer Graphics vs. Ashby Computer Graphics), many of their games were heavily inspired by Ultimate's output (Odin's Nodes of Yesod certainly owes a considerable debt to Ultimate's Underwurlde).

In 1987, Odin finally closed their doors, mainly due to an inability to expand the size of their teams while maintaining the quality that had put the company on the map in the first place. Although they delivered more than all the necessary titles to fulfil their contract, Telecomsoft deemed several of them to be not worthy of release. By this time many of Odin's core programmers and artists had already left. Several ex-Odin staff initially joined Denton Designs, another Liverpool-based games developer, before going their separate ways.

In 2005, Paul McKenna reformed Odin Computer Graphics Ltd, to develop and produce new titles and convert Nodes of Yesod, Arc of Yesod, Heartland and Robin of the Wood on the Mobile Phone formats.

In 2010, Odin Computer Graphics, Ltd. in conjunction with Uztek Games, Inc. released Nodes of Yesod for the iPhone. A web browser version built with Adobe Flash was also released in the same year.

== Games developed ==
- Nodes of Yesod (1985; ZX Spectrum, C64, Amstrad CPC, Enterprise 64/128)
- Robin of the Wood (1985; ZX Spectrum, C64)
- The Arc of Yesod (1985; ZX Spectrum, C64)
- I.C.U.P.S. (1986; ZX Spectrum, C64)
- Mission A.D. (1986; C64)
- Heartland (1986; ZX Spectrum, C64, Amstrad CPC)
- Hypa-Ball (1986; ZX Spectrum, C64)
- On the Tiles (1987; C64)
- Sidewize (1987; ZX Spectrum, C64)
- U.F.O. (1987; C64)
- The Plot (1988; ZX Spectrum, Amstrad CPC) [Originally titled 'The Gunpowder Plot']
- Scary Monsters (1988; Commodore 64)
- Crosswize (1988; ZX Spectrum)
- Gladiator (unreleased)
- Tank Game (unreleased)
- P.L.O.D. (unreleased)
- Lusitania (unreleased)
