= Mike Singleton =

British video game designer (1951–2012)

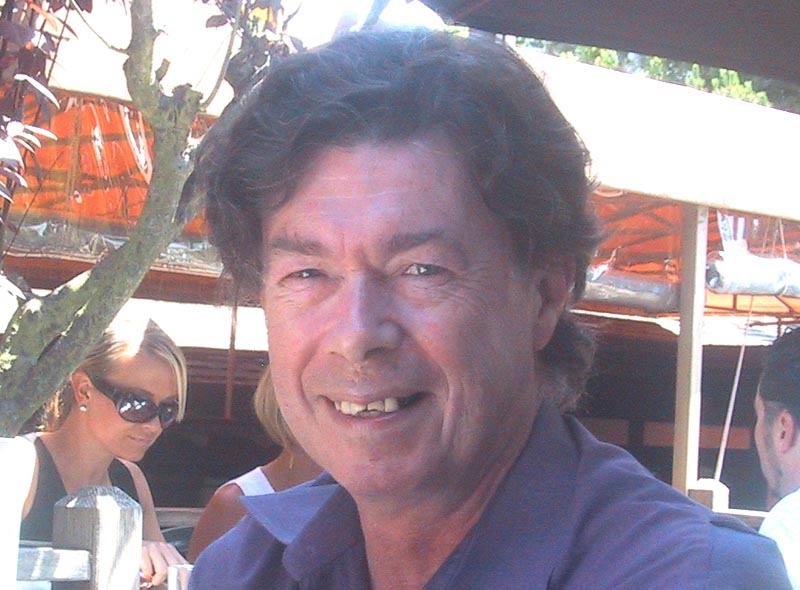
- Mike Singleton in San Diego, California in 2005
- Born: 21 February 1951
- Died: 10 October 2012 (aged 61); Switzerland
- Occupation: Video game designer
- Employer(s): Cheshire Education Authority; Postern Software; PetSoft; Beyond Software; Melbourne House; Rainbird Software; Simon & Schuster Interactive; Mirage Software; Microprose
- Known for: The Lords of Midnight; Doomdark's Revenge; Midwinter

Mike Singleton (21 February 1951 – 10 October 2012) was an influential British video game designer who wrote a number of well-regarded titles in the 1980s, as well as being a contributor to games in the 21st century. His titles include The Lords of Midnight, Doomdark's Revenge, Dark Sceptre, War in Middle Earth and Midwinter. Before developing video games, Singleton was an English teacher in Ellesmere Port, Cheshire, England.

== Early work ==
Singleton was originally a teacher and started programming in the late 1970s, and writing Computer Race, a horse racing game he designed for a betting shop on the Commodore PET. Moving on from this, he began writing action games for the PET, working with PetSoft. He wrote Space Acein 6502 machine code; the game broke sales records of the day by selling three hundred copies.

Singleton's association with PetSoft was short-lived, as PetSoft, who had been due to enter into a contract with Sinclair Research in Cambridge to write software for the new ZX80, lost out on the deal to Psion. Singleton contacted British inventor and entrepreneur Clive Sinclair and was asked to send his games along. He was then asked to visit the site in Cambridge, and invited to work on software for their brand new ZX81 micro.

Singleton used this as the platform for his GamesPack1 project. GamesPack1 was a series of games, each fitting into just 1 kilobyte of memory. It was one of the first commercial software programs written for the ZX81, and something of a runaway success, selling a massive 90,000 copies, earning Singleton £6,000 for his efforts, having taken him just two weeks over the Christmas holidays to complete.

== Golden age of the home microcomputer ==
Whilst the arcade game writing business was making him a living, Singleton, who retired from teaching completely in 1982 to become a full-time freelance games designer, was always an old school war gamer at heart, hooked from an early age on war board games and play-by-mail (PBM) strategy gaming, working for a time on Seventh Empire, a PBM game he put together for Computer and Video Games magazine (C&VG), which eventually led to Beyond Software when C&VG editor Terry Pratt moved to run Beyond.

In March 1984, Singleton's spy-themed board game, Treachery, which had its complicated game logic controlled by a computer program, was featured in C&VG, with a type-in listing for the Spectrum, together with a keyboard overlay (a common feature of his games), centre-spread board and a set of counters. The game was so popular among the readers that the editor asked for conversions for the Commodore 64 and BBC Micro to be produced, and each of them featured in C&VG's 1985 yearbook.

Having progressed to the ZX Spectrum, he wrote what are widely regarded as some of the best strategy adventure games ever to be seen on those early home microcomputers, the Midnight series: Lords of Midnight (released in 1984) and Doomdark's Revenge, which were originally intended to form the first two episodes in a trilogy of which, the final episode, Eye of the Moon, never came about. Each of the two games played out on a scale never seen before back in the mid-eighties: at a time when many games were boasting 50 or even 100 locations, Lords of Midnight's groundbreaking gameplay featured over 4,000 locations, and Doomdark's Revenge, 6,000, plus well in excess of 100 player controllable characters. Had Eye of the Moon come to fruition, it was to have had around 24,000 locations, in a map featuring twelve distinct regions, each with a local sub-quest completely separate from the main objective of the game.

In addition to his development work, Singleton contributed to the gaming community through his regular column, "Fifth Column," in Computer & Video Games.

Moving on from the Midnight series, Singleton worked on several games of a more arcade-like nature, the first of which, Throne of Fire, a side viewed live action game, featured a multiplayer option where each player used the same computer to explore simultaneously, each trying to complete a set of objectives which lead to the overall completion of the game. Dark Sceptre, released later the same year, was also in essence a sideways viewed live action game, but returned to a more adventure-like feel, with a long, drawn out challenge awaiting the player who would need to build up their forces to consolidate their position before seizing on the opportunity to actually complete the game.

Two years later, War in Middle-earth, whilst essentially an adventure game on a similar scale to the Midnight series, represented a switch from the adventure to an action philosophy, requiring the player to interact with the characters under their control directly, moving them individually in each of the battles, giving the game much more of an arcade/adventure feel. The game was developed by Maelstrom Games, which had originally been created by Singleton to run the PBM version of Dark Sceptre.

== Later work ==
In the late 1980s, Singleton moved onto the 16-bit machines that were making an appearance, and worked on the classic Midwinter games, also producing a third game in the Lords of Midnight series in 1995, Lords of Midnight: The Citadel.

In the 21st century, Singleton continued working in games design, making him one of a few developers to have made the transition to more modern consoles from the early days of home computing. Singleton worked for Midas Interactive and LucasArts on several games for the Xbox and PlayStation consoles, such as the action games HyperSonic Xtreme and Indiana Jones and the Emperor's Tomb. Singleton worked on the strategy game Wrath Unleashed, with his latest productions being Gauntlet: Seven Sorrows, a continuation of the 1980s arcade classic Gauntlet series of games, and Race Driver: Grid, a racing game developed by Codemasters. At the time of his death after suffering from cancer, Singleton was working on an iPhone port of Lords of Midnight.

== Personal life ==
A short biography published in the February 1985 issue of Computer & Video Games magazine highlighted Mike Singleton's passion for playing games, particularly the board game Go. The article also noted that Singleton enjoyed steak and chips and preferred drinking lager. He was a fan of the television program Doctor Who and appreciated music from rock bands such as Pink Floyd, Deep Purple, and Led Zeppelin. In the interview, Singleton expressed his ambition to create a timeless classic game, comparable to chess in its enduring appeal.

== Games ==
=== 8-bit home computers ===
Title	Distributor	Year	Platform
Space Ace	PetSoft	1981	PET
GamesPack1	Sinclair Research Ltd	1981	ZX81
Shadowfax	Postern	1982	BBC, C64/VIC-20, Spectrum
Siege	Postern	1983	PET/C64/VIC-20, Spectrum
Snake Pit	Postern	1983	C64/PET/VIC-20, Spectrum
3-Deep Space	Postern	1983	C64/VIC-20, Spectrum
The Lords of Midnight	Beyond Software	1984	Amstrad CPC, C64, Spectrum
Doomdark's Revenge	Beyond	1985	Amstrad CPC, C64, Spectrum
Quake Minus One	Beyond Software	1985	C64
Dark Sceptre	Beyond Software	1986	Spectrum
Throne of Fire	Melbourne House	1987	Amstrad CPC, C64, Spectrum
War in Middle Earth	Melbourne House	1988	Spectrum
Star Trek: The Rebel Universe	Firebird Software	1988	C64

=== Later computers ===
Title	Distributor	Year	Platform
Star Trek: The Rebel Universe	Simon & Schuster Interactive	1987	Atari ST, PC
Space Cutter	Melbourne House	1987	Amiga
War in Middle Earth	Melbourne House	1988	Atari ST, Amiga, PC
Whirligig	Firebird Software	1988	Atari ST, Amiga
Midwinter	Rainbird Software	1989	Atari ST, Amiga, PC
Flames of Freedom	MicroProse	1990	Atari ST, Amiga, PC
Grimblood	Virgin Interactive	1990	Atari ST, Amiga
Ashes of Empire/Fallen Empire	Mirage	1991	Amiga, PC
Starlord	MicroProse	1993	Amiga, PC
Lords of Midnight: The Citadel	Domark	1995	PC
The Ring Cycle	Psygnosis	1995	PC

=== Consoles ===
Title	Distributor	Year	Platform
HSX: HyperSonic Xtreme	Midas Interactive Entertainment	2002	PlayStation
Indiana Jones and the Emperor's Tomb	LucasArts	2003	Mac, PC, PS2, Xbox
Wrath Unleashed	LucasArts	2004	PS2, Xbox
Gauntlet: Seven Sorrows	Midway Home Entertainment	2005	PS2, Xbox
Race Driver: Grid	Codemasters	2008	PC, PS3, Xbox 360
