= Fish! =

1988 video game

- Cover art
- Developer: Magnetic Scrolls
- Publisher: Rainbird Software
- Platforms: Amiga, Amstrad PCW, Acorn Archimedes, Atari ST, Commodore 64, MS-DOS, ZX Spectrum.
- Release: 1988
- Genre: Interactive fiction
- Mode: Single-player

Fish! is a text adventure game by Magnetic Scrolls released in 1988. The game was designed by John Molloy, Phil South and Peter Kemp with contributions by Rob Steggles.

== Plot ==
According to the game scenario, the Inter-Dimensional Espionage sends operatives throughout the dimensions to fight evil. This is done by possessing someone's body and controlling his actions.

The player is Agent 10 who enjoys his leave of absence in the body of a goldfish. He learns that an inter-dimensional terrorist group named the Seven Deadly Fins have stolen a focus wheel. In the first part of the game, the player can visit three dimensions (a forest with a smithy, a hippie van near an abbey and a recording studio).

Once the three parts of the wheel are gathered, he learns that the Fins are threatening to take over the water-world of Hydropolis by evaporating the ocean of that planet. The player must warp to Hydropolis to foil the Seven Deadly Fins. The player possesses Dr. Roach, who is in charge of the Project that will transfer water from another dimension to keep Hydropolis alive.

== Gameplay ==
The game is a standard text adventure with static graphics in some versions.

The game was re-released as part of the Magnetic Scrolls Collection, featuring a GUI with an auto-map system, inventory, and pop-down menus.

== Reception ==
Reception

Review scores
Publication	Score
Computer and Video Games	9 out of 10
Zzap!64	93%

Award
Publication	Award
Crash	Smash

The game was voted Best 16-bit Adventure Game of the Year at the Golden Joystick Awards.

Keith Campbell of Computer and Video Games wrote that Fish! was "like no other adventure I've played before", and that it is "the most pun packed adventure ever." He praised the humor and cited the game as another example of Magnetic Scrolls "cleaning up on the adventure scene this year." Reviewing Fish in Zzap!64, Kati Hamza wrote, "Every Magnetic Scrolls adventure gets praised to the skies, wins a thousand awards and gets an incredibly high mark in all the magazines. You'd think they could produce a dud once in awhile just for variety's sake". She remarked that Fish is "slick, subtle and sparkles with subaquatic humor", and that its "parser is up to Magnetic Scrolls usual high standards".

In 1992, Charles Ardai of Computer Gaming World wrote when reviewing Magnetic Scrolls Collection that Fish! was "just a shade too crazy. Unpredictable is good; incomprehensible is not", but "if nothing else, this makes the game original" and had "the most clever gags of the three games".
