= Quake Minus One =

1985 video game

- Developer(s): Warren Foulkes; Mike Singleton
- Publisher(s): EU: Beyond Software; NA: Mindscape
- Platform(s): Commodore 64
- Release: EU/NA: 1985
- Genre(s): Real-time strategy
- Mode(s): Single-player

Quake Minus One is a real-time strategy video game published for the Commodore 64 by Monolith/Beyond in 1985 and was written by Warren Foulkes and Mike Singleton.

== Premise ==
In the 1980s, the Western world constructed a large power plant named Titan under the Atlantic Ocean in order to extract geothermal energy from the Mid-Atlantic Ridge where the Earth's crust is thinnest. The power plant is operated and maintained solely by robots. Members of the Robot Liberation Front invade the power plant and seize control of the robots demanding equal rights for the machines, failing which they would use the power plant to trigger a massive earthquake which would severely threaten America, Europe and Africa. Titan is under the control of five separate AI computers - Zeus, Poseidon, Vulcan, Ares and Hermes. Scientists have managed to regain control of Hermes and the robots it operates. It is up to these robots to take control of the other four computers who are themselves moving to regain control of Hermes.

== Gameplay ==
The action begins with the player in control with a randomly placed Hermes controlled robot. The AI is maneuvering its robots to take control of Hermes so it is up to the player to maneuver their robots and formulate a strategy to retake control of the wayward computers. The player does have one advantage - he can enter into the map mode which will pause the game allowing a brief respite from the action and a chance to view a detailed map of the Titan installation.

As robots travel down roads, they may come to roads controlled by other computers where they will be attacked by fixed installations such as bunkers. Robots that have ion cannons can capture roads and junctions putting them under the control of Hermes. Once a computer is captured, all its remaining robots are passed to the control of Hermes. There are also quake suppression buildings to protect which if destroyed, bring forward the game's deadline.

== User reception ==
Zzap!64 found the game confusing with unclear instructions and a disappointment following pre-release publicity. The magazine gave the game an overall score of 67%.
