= The Legacy: Realm of Terror =

1993 video game

- Developer: Magnetic Scrolls
- Publishers: MicroProse; Piko Interactive (Note: (Microsoft Windows, macOS, and Linux))
- Producer: John Oldman
- Designers: Jim Bambra; Stephen Hand
- Programmers: Matt Innes; Neil McGrath; Andrew Walrond
- Artists: Kevin R. Ayre; Nick Cook; Theo Pantazi
- Composer: John Broomhall
- Platform: MS-DOS
- Release: EU: 1992; NA: March, 1993
- Genres: Role-playing, dungeon crawl
- Mode: Single-player

The Legacy: Realm of Terror (titled simply The Legacy in some countries; its working title was Haunted House) is a horror role-playing video game developed by Magnetic Scrolls and published by MicroProse for the MS-DOS in 1992–1993. A special collector's edition was released by RadioShack. A cancelled version of the game for the Amiga was in development in 1993. It was released digitally on December 20, 2019 by Piko Interactive on GOG.com with support for Microsoft Windows, macOS, and Linux pre-packed with DOSBox.

== Gameplay ==
The game starts with the premise that the main character has inherited a haunted mansion. Magic is real and plays a central role in the game, but it is set in the present day (that is, early 1990s) so the player can expect to find modern items such as chainsaws, TV sets, etc. The gameplay consists mainly of exploring the house by interacting with objects, characters, fighting monsters and solving puzzles, using the mouse as an input device. The game interface has five windows that can be resized and moved in any way, making the interface customizable to suit player preferences.

Unlike most RPG titles of the time, the player does not have a party of characters but instead just one character. (In the user manual, the developers remark that this decision was made with the idea that the player would have a greater feeling of isolation by having only one playable character rather than a party.) When starting the game, the player can choose from a list of available characters that fit in with the story, or can change characters' stats to customize them. The game offers customization of a character by first selecting the appearance, and then the stats. The character's stats can also improve while progressing through the game.

The game then begins as the character has just walked in the front door of the mansion and the door has slammed behind them. The object of the game is to get out alive. To do this, the player must learn magic, increase battle skills, and solve puzzles to combat the final boss, Belthegor. There are ten areas to explore. They are the 1st floor (the beginning of the game), 2nd floor (looks similar to the first, just more to explore), 3rd floor (also known as the sanitarium), 4th floor (museum), the observatory, 1st basement, 2nd basement, temple, fish people lair, and finally the other realm. While it is played alone, there are three other people in the house: two apparent relatives (that must be killed) and a trapped private detective locked in the second floor.

Many aspects of the horror spectrum are present in the game. If the character does not have a high enough willpower, they will be immobilized by fear. The first time the character sees a monster, they will scream until it is out of sight, only to become more acclimated to it and therefore not scared anymore on subsequent encounters.

Scattered through the house on the various floors and realms are objects of varying utility and power. The first object one can get is the spell book. Depending on stats to begin the game, a character may even have a spell or two available to use. If not, the player must increase the character's knowledge and willpower during game play and find a spell page lying around so the spell can be added to the spell book. Spells are broken up into four categories: the Destructors, the Protectors, the Enhancers, and the Mystics, with four to six spells in each category. The player must have the spell book open in order to use a spell, but once used its effects do not require the book to remain open. Crystals are used to restore spell points, while rest and first aid kits (as well as use of the "Elixir of Health" spell) restore vitality points.

The game features a scattered arsenal of weapons and armor, from small caliber pistols and a baseball bat to a katana and a chainsaw. The inventory of the items any character can carry is limited. At first the character only has pockets and hands available, but if the player finds a briefcase, carrying items becomes easier. The character's weapons can run out of bullets, the chainsaw will run out of gas and, while magic is the only way to win the game, the character can run out of power. The character can die easily, hence use of the save game feature is suggested.

Attacking is carried out by pressing one of the "Hit" or "Aim" buttons. There are two of each of these buttons, one pair for the left hand and one pair for the right. Whatever is in the hand will be used as the weapon. The "Hit" button will attack the nearest target automatically, while the "Aim" button will turn the cursor into cross hairs. The player can then manually aim at the target, which can be useful when facing multiple enemies at once, but is otherwise unneeded.

== Reception ==
Computer Gaming World in 1993 praised The Legacy's "cast of demons who shine with supernatural depth and move with near video quality", and warned that those who found the enemies "excessively traumatic should avoid the program". The magazine concluded that although the game "does not attempt to widen the envelope of conventional computer role playing ... it delivers some very solid entertainment in the form of eye-opening visuals and a page-turner of a story."

James V. Trunzo reviewed The Legacy: Realm of Terror in White Wolf #40 (1994), giving it a final evaluation of "Excellent" and stated that "Legacy: Realm of Terror does what it sets out to do. It provides a very enjoyable and challenging task, built around a very believable framework. With the lights out and a good sound card, playing Legacy at night should have you looking over your shoulder and flinching at every shadow. There is a dark and disturbing side to humanity, one lured by evil to do evil. If you've ever wondered about what's on the other side of sanity, enter Winthrop house and pray that you can leave again."

== See also ==
- Alone in the Dark
