= Midwinter (video game) =

1989 video game

- Developer: Maelstrom Games
- Publisher: MicroProse
- Designer: Mike Singleton
- Programmers: George Williamson (Amiga); Dave Gautrey (Atari ST); David Ollman (MS-DOS)
- Artist: Andrew Elkerton
- Platforms: Amiga, Atari ST, MS-DOS
- Release: 1989: Atari ST, MS-DOS; 1990: Amiga
- Genres: Action role-playing, strategy
- Mode: Single-player

Midwinter is a post-apocalyptic first-person action role-playing game with strategy and survival elements designed by Mike Singleton. It was published by MicroProse on the Rainbird label (Microplay in the US) for the Atari ST and MS-DOS in 1990. An Amiga version followed in 1990. The game was critically acclaimed and was followed by Flames of Freedom in 1991.

== Plot ==
The game is set in 2099 when the entire world is covered in snow and ice in a post-apocalyptic scenario, on the 160,000-square-mile (410,000 km^{2}) isle of Midwinter. The game package includes an extensive manual narrating its backstory in a short novella. It describes a cataclysmic meteorite strike in Burma around 2040 which caused an impact winter. The ensuing diamond dust covering the Earth brought about global cooling and consequently major economical, political and military tumult. The northern population died of glaciation and famine whereas the more temperate zones became overcrowded due to migration. As the glaciers advanced, the sea level dropped, providing more habitable space.

Midwinter island formed following massive volcanic activity in the Azores island group; Pico Island, Sao Jorge Island and Terceira Island became its mountains. The manual describes how the island was settled between 2060 and 2081 by waves of survivors and refugees from the mainland, and the formation of the local militia called Free Villages Peace Force (FVPF). At the start of the game, the despotic General Masters is attempting to take over the island by force.

The player takes control as the protagonist, FVPF commander John Stark, is ambushed by one of General Masters' units of missile-armed snowmobiles. Stark, initially armed only with a handful of grenades, a sniper rifle and a pair of skis, must make his escape, alert the rest of islanders, and resist the invasion. This is done by travelling around Midwinter, recruiting civilians and other available members of the FVPF, and mounting a guerrilla warfare campaign to stem the tide of Masters' troops and ultimately stop him by destroying his headquarters in Shining Hollow, in the extreme south-east of the island, before his forces capture all of the major settlements on the island.

== Gameplay ==
Atari ST ski gameplay screenshot

The game uses a timer system to simulate the simultaneous operation of the recruits. The player has two hours of game-time to play as each recruit, and once that recruit's timer runs out, the player starts controlling the next one in line. Only after the player has spent the two hours playing each recruit does the game's clock move forward, and a new series of turns begins.

Midwinter is covered in snow, and has some nearly impassable mountainous regions as well as some flat rolling plains. There are many different variables to take into account (characters' skills, terrain, etc.) when deciding how to move around. The entire island is rendered with shaded 3D polygons.

Characters can move around in several ways. Skiing is always available provided the character isn't badly injured, but is the slowest method of travel. Characters can find or salvage snowmobiles which are substantially quicker and usually armed, but have trouble with rough terrain and are lost when wrecked. Cable cars provide fixed transport routes into mountainous regions, where hang gliders can be found allowing characters to fly limited distances.

Each of the 32 recruits has a history of their own, which decides their allegiances and various skills. This history provides clues on whether or not the current player character will be able to recruit any other given recruit. For example, Stark can recruit Nurse Maddocks, as they are engaged; however, Stark cannot recruit Grazzini, as he is jealous of Stark's relationship with Maddocks. Some of the more useful recruits are only recruitable by a couple of other characters, and a successful strategy involves recruiting these people as swiftly as possible. For example, Prof Kristiansen (an excellent saboteur and the only character with the special ability to break through the enemy's radio jamming) can only be recruited by his grandson, Davy Hart, or Adams, Hart's girlfriend, who in turn, are only recruitable by a handful of other characters. Some characters are held prisoner by the enemy, and must be freed by destroying the building they're in with explosives.

Recruits can be injured (but not be killed). Injuries can be either slight or severe, and can be sustained on different body areas. Injuries heal over time (accelerated by first aid and sleep), but different injuries affect a character in different ways; for example, an injured arm reduces sniping accuracy, whereas an injured leg reduces skiing top speed, stamina and increases the likelihood of a crash. Head and torso injuries affect all activities. If a character is severely injured they will not be able to perform activities such as skiing and driving, in which case they will be immobilized and must use a distress flare, whereupon they will be rescued and transported to the nearest building (which may be enemy-controlled, in which case the character is captured).

Enemy forces consist of a variety of missile-armed snowbuggies and unarmed supply vehicles. The average unit consists of around 50 vehicles, and four units make up one squadron. Individual vehicles can be destroyed by rifle fire, grenades or missiles. Units can be eliminated by killing the unit/squadron commander, or by destroying a certain proportion of the unit's vehicles, effectively routing the unit. The difficulty level of the game is modified by enabling the enemy to use mortars fire (guided by spotter planes) and/or attack aircraft.

== Reception ==
Reception

Review score
Publication	Score
Computer Gaming World	3/5

Midwinter was very well received at the time of release. The game was given usually very positive reviews and won many editor's choice awards, including 97% / Zzap Gold Medal by Zzap 64 (Amiga version), 96% / CU Super Star by CU Amiga, 96% / Amiga Computing Supreme by Amiga Computing, 94% / Star Player by The Games Machine for both Amiga and Atari ST versions, 94% and Zero Hour by Zero (DOS version), and 92% / Amiga Format Gold by Amiga Format. A 1994 Computer Gaming World survey of strategic space games set in the year 2000 and later gave the game three stars out of five, stating that "the strategist will enjoy the variety of ways to get at the enemy".

Midwinter was covered by Eurogamer's Dan Whitehead in a retrospective article, which praised the mix of genres the game contained, calling it "a unique creature; a priceless transitional specimen in the fossil record of gaming." In their 2009 retrospective article, Edge staff wrote: "Playing it felt like time travel – a sneak peak[sic] at the blueprint that showed how games were going to be. It was then, and is now, an enormous accomplishment." GameSpot featured Midwinter in its feature article "Unsung Heroes" about the 10 games most deserving "more recognition than they received" and should be "remembered for their contributions to their respective genres and to gaming as a whole."

== Legacy ==
The sequel, Midwinter II: Flames of Freedom, was developed by Maelstrom Games and published by MicroProse for the same platforms in 1991. In 2014, Chilli Hugger Software announced a Midwinter remake project; originally planned for a 2015 release, the remake has been indefinitely delayed and possibly abandoned. In September 2026, an independent developer released Midwinter Fan Remaster, a rebuild of the game in Unreal Engine 5, on Steam in early access, with the permission of the remake rights holder.
