= War in Middle Earth =

1988 video game

- Developer: Synergistic Software
- Publisher: Melbourne House
- Designers: Mike Singleton; Alan Clark; Robert Clardy
- Engine: World Builders
- Platforms: MS-DOS, Commodore 64, ZX Spectrum, Amstrad CPC, MSX, Amiga, Atari ST, Apple IIGS
- Release: NA: 1988; EU: 1988
- Genre: Real-time strategy
- Mode: Single-player

Gondorian soldiers and the city of Minas Tirith

War in Middle Earth is a real-time strategy game released for the ZX Spectrum, MSX, Commodore 64, Amstrad CPC, MS-DOS, Amiga, Apple IIGS, and Atari ST in 1988 by Virgin Mastertronic on the Melbourne House label.

The game combines both large scale army unit level and small scale character level. All the action happens simultaneously in game world and places could be seen from the map or at the ground level. Individual characters can also be seen in larger battles (in which they either survive or die). If the battle is less than 100 units, approximately, it can be watched on ground level. Otherwise it will be only displayed numerically. On ground level characters can acquire objects and talk with non-player characters (such as Radagast or Tom Bombadil).

== Reception ==
The game was reviewed in 1989 in Dragon #147 by Hartley, Patricia, and Kirk Lesser in "The Role of Computers" column. The reviewers gave the game 3 out of 5 stars. Computer Gaming World gave the game a mixed review, noting that, although it faithfully recreates the events of the books, genuine strategy is lacking and the game plays very similarly on subsequent playthroughs. Compute!'s review was more positive, only criticizing an anticlimactic ending to "an otherwise impressive game" that was "faithful to the Middle Earth story line".

The Spanish magazine Microhobby valued the game with the following scores: Originality: 80% Graphics: 70% Motion: - Sound: 50% Difficulty: 100% Addiction: 80%
