= Myth (1989 video game) =

1989 video game

- Developer: Magnetic Scrolls
- Publisher: Official Secrets
- Designer: Paul Findley
- Platforms: Amiga, Amstrad PCW, Atari ST, Commodore 64, MS-DOS, ZX Spectrum.
- Release: 1989
- Genre: Interactive fiction
- Mode: Single-player

Myth is an interactive fiction game by Magnetic Scrolls released in 1989. Some versions have static graphics. The game was only released in limited numbers to members of the Official Secrets adventuring club.

== Plot ==
Zeus has ordered the gods of Olympus to perform various tasks to impress humanity. As Poseidon, the player's mission is to steal the Helmet of Invisibility from Hades.
