= The Guild of Thieves =

1987 video game

- ZX Spectrum cover art
- Developer: Magnetic Scrolls
- Publisher: Rainbird Software
- Designer: Rob Steggles
- Platforms: Amiga, Amstrad CPC, Amstrad PCW, Apple II, Archimedes, Atari ST, Atari 8-bit, Commodore 64, MS-DOS, Mac, ZX Spectrum
- Release: 1987
- Genre: Interactive fiction
- Mode: Single-player

The Guild of Thieves is an interactive fiction game by Magnetic Scrolls first published by Rainbird in 1987. The game takes place in Kerovnia, the setting of the company's earlier The Pawn.

== Gameplay ==
Start of the Amiga version

The player's character is "an aspiring member of the infamous Guild of Thieves" and is to steal all the valuables that can be found in and around an island castle. The game features "extremely atmospheric" descriptions and 30 artistic renditions of key locations. Included in the game package are a faux newsletter of the Guild of Thieves titled What Burglar providing instructions and hints for the game, a Bank of Kerovnia Trading Account Card, a guild contract detailing the arrangement between the player's character and the Guild of Thieves, and small dice.

== Reception ==
Reception

Review score
Publication	Score
Crash	90%

The game was voted Best Adventure Game Of The Year at the Golden Joystick Awards.

Dragon complimented the game, calling it an "exciting sequel" to The Pawn, citing its "witty dialogue, outstanding graphics, wry humor, and challenging puzzles". Computer Gaming World in 1988 approved of the game's sophisticated parser, British humor, and high-quality graphics. It concluded, "the game must be highly recommended and it is tough ... it compares well with the best of Infocom". The magazine's Charles Ardai in 1992 called its puzzles "pretty good, requiring a certain amount of ingenuity ... None are particularly memorable, though. The game is good, but lacks the sparks of innovation that would elevate it above the level of dozens of similar games".

Antic stated "The outstanding graphics of The Pawn are matched by those in Guild of Thieves. High-resolution pictures transport you into a medieval world of thieves, castles and treasure. The only complaint I have about the Atari XE/XL version is that most of the detailed graphics had only shades of one or two colors."

== Legacy ==
The game was re-released in 1992 as part of the Magnetic Scrolls Collection. The new version had an updated user interface and came with an art poster depicting the island.

In June 2017, Magnetic Scrolls successfully recovered the source code of The Guild of Thieves (among other games) to remaster and re-release them. In December 2017, the remastered and enhanced edition of the game was published.
