= Flames of Freedom =

1991 video game

- North American cover art
- Developer: Maelstrom Games
- Publisher: Rainbird / MicroProse
- Director: Mike Singleton
- Producers: Hugh F. Batterbury; Peter Moreland
- Programmers: David Gautrey; George Williamson; David Ollman
- Artist: Andrew Elkerton
- Writer: Rob Davies
- Composer: David Lowe
- Platforms: Amiga, Atari ST, MS-DOS
- Release: 1991
- Genres: First-person shooter, role-playing, simulation
- Mode: Single-player

Flames of Freedom (also known as Midwinter II: Flames of Freedom) is a first-person shooter role-playing video game with simulation elements developed by Maelstrom Games and published by MicroProse for MS-DOS, Amiga, and Atari ST in 1991. It is a sequel to the 1989 game Midwinter and its working title was Wildfire. The Amiga version was re-released by Kixx XL in 1993.

== Gameplay ==
DOS gameplay screenshot

The game's set following the end of the impact winter from the first Midwinter. Midwinter Isle has submerged, but its people and traditions of liberty live on thanks to a timely union with the island of Verde, now renamed Agora to mark the occasion and sometimes referred to as the Atlantic Federation. Unfortunately, between Agora and the Saharan Empire on the African mainland lies an archipelago of Saharan conquests now known as the Slave Isles. Agoran intelligence discovers plans for the Operation Scorpio, a massive Saharan attack to conquer Agora, as well as widespread but scattered resistance on the isles. They launch Operation Wildfire, a series of covert missions to push islands into rebellion in order to delay and bleed the Saharan armada on its way to Agora.

The player controls the secret agent tasked with the operation, and can either play a single mission (called "Raid" mode), or a succession in campaign mode. In campaign mode the armada eventually launches, instigating an endgame where the player must destroy the armada as it makes its way through the Slave Isles. Success will save Agora and, incidentally, inspire the islands into a general revolt casting off their overlord.

The missions are generally open-ended, allowing the player to approach them in whatever fashion is desired. Each island has different objectives (sabotage, assassinations, etc.), and the order in which these are tackled is up to the player. The game attempts to create a detailed open world by providing a number of different characters and different vehicles that the player can interact with. Vehicles include land, air, and sea vessels (players can hijack any enemy-operated vehicle), although all of them control in more or less the same basic manner. The graphics are relatively rudimentary 3D, although typical for the time period.

=== Strategy layer ===
In campaign mode the player can tackle the islands in any order, limited by time, but doesn't seek to liberate all or the most islands; instead, the goal is to prepare an arduous route for the Saharan armada.

Once the armada sets sail (Note: After 180 in-game days or as soon as the "A" key is pressed in 3D view.) it'll make its way through the archipelago, suffering attrition while passing or crossing liberated islands. The archipelago is represented as an undirected graph where an island's considered liberated as soon as its mission is completed, or it can't trace a path to the mainland or to one of three stronghold islands. Instead of having a set path, the computer uses pathfinding to set a course that crosses the fewest liberated islands possible, is short, and prefers heavily garrisoned stronghold islands to other Saharan holdings. The player may view the course, time, and losses the computer is set to take, as well as simulate what they'll be if more islands are liberated, and the computer's decision-making priorities are public; in mathematics and computer science, such a task is known as seeking worst-case complexity. In Flames of Freedom the player faces the additional challenge of using the player-controlled covert operative to build the chosen route, which may fail to be completed or require changes on the fly.

Each liberated island awards the player a single-use secret weapon, a monetary reward, and a luxury item such as a seaside villa or the inhabitants' collected savings. Luxury items' only use is to add their value to the money, which itself is only to keep score. The game maintains a record of them nonetheless. An additional element of challenge is that the player character needs time to travel to each island, and upon completing a mission must return to Agora to rest for five days plus recovery time from any current injuries, further limiting the player's ability to make changes in the archipelago.

The armada's launch precipitates the endgame. No more missions can be completed and the game world opens up completely by allowing the player to travel between islands. (Note: Previously the player could cross the ocean, but nothing on other islands would spawn.) A part of the armada will always survive the travails of the journey, and the game is won through the complete destruction of the armada in an extended running battle before any part of it can reach a vital location on Agora.

== Reception ==
Reception

Review score
Publication	Score
Computer Gaming World	2.5/5

Midwinter II won several accolades, including 96% / CVG Hit by C+VG and 95% / ACE TrailBlazer by ACE for the Atari ST version, and 92% / CU Screen Star by CU Amiga for the Amiga version. A 1994 Computer Gaming World survey of strategic space games set in the year 2000 and later gave the game two-plus stars out of five, stating that because of its "more temperate environment" it was "less interesting than its predecessor".
