= Hypaball =

1986 video game

- Developer: Odin Computer Graphics
- Publisher: Odin Computer Graphics
- Designer: Marc Dawson
- Programmers: Marc Dawson (C64); Bernie Duggs (Spectrum)
- Artist: Andy Rixon
- Composer: Keith Tinman
- Platforms: Commodore 64, ZX Spectrum
- Release: NA: 1986; EU: 1986
- Genre: Sports
- Mode: Single-player

Hypaball is a video game for the Commodore 64 based on a fictitious, futuristic sport and published by Odin Computer Graphics 1986. It was designed and programmed by Marc Dawson with graphics by Andy Rixon and music by Keith Tinman. A ZX Spectrum version followed in 1987, ported by Bernie Duggs.

== Gameplay ==
In Hypaball, there can be up to three team members that include two strikers and one grounder. The goal of the game is to hit the moving target in the middle, and the ball cannot be held for more than two seconds. The game moves fast, and it is a more modern version of the game Pong.
