= Doomdark's Revenge =

1984 video game

- Developers: Mike Singleton; Stewart Peart (C64)
- Publisher: Beyond Software
- Platforms: ZX Spectrum, Amstrad CPC, Commodore 64, BlackBerry OS, Android, iOS, OS X, Windows
- Release: EU: 1984 (SPEC)}; EU: 1986 (CPC, C64)
- Genres: Role-playing, wargame
- Mode: Single-player

Doomdark's Revenge is a role-playing and wargame video game developed by Mike Singleton and published by Beyond Software for the ZX Spectrum in 1984. It is a sequel to Singleton's 1984 The Lords of Midnight and has similar game mechanics but adds more detail and complexity with the number of characters and locations increased.

In Doomdark's Revenge, the hero of the first game, Luxor the Moonprince, goes into the savage wastes of Icemark to rescue his son Morkin and defeat the evil Empress Shareth, daughter of his enemy Doomdark. Despite the title, Doomdark - who was killed in the first game - does not return for the sequel.

Like its predecessor, Doomdark's Revenge was a major critical success and a commercial hit. Ports to the Amstrad CPC and Commodore 64 were released in 1986. It was supposed to be followed by a sequel titled The Eye of the Moon in 1989, which was never finished. Another sequel, Lords of Midnight: The Citadel, was eventually released in 1995.

== Gameplay ==
Luxor's Moonring allows the player to view the world through the eyes of any character that is already in alliance or who has been recruited to Luxor's cause and, in each game day, the player may select characters in turn and move them around the Icemark, seeking objects, allies or enemies.

The game has five factions to be recruited or fought: the Fey, Barbarians, Dwarfs, Giants, and Icelords. The main difference between Doomdark's Revenge and The Lords of Midnight is that the lords now all move and react independently, no longer content to sit in their castles and wait to be recruited. The enemy leader, Shareth, also moves around, attempting to recruit armies and lords to her cause, so a major part of the game involves recruiting sufficient forces to counter hers. This makes the relationship between lords very important, as some are vassals of others, and may only be recruited by their lieges. Recruiting a liege does not automatically recruit all his vassals, nor their respective vassals but it offers additional armed strength as well as access to the Lord's city or fortress. Lords may also cooperate, recruit and fight each other independently, making the world much more dynamic than the previous game. Hostile fortresses or cities may be sacked and taken ownership of, which become important sources of manpower as they slowly generate troops that can be used to replace those lost in battle elsewhere.

The Icemark is a varied environment with forests, mountain ranges, plains and hills, all of which offer some resistance to the distance which may be travelled in each game 'day'. The land also features pits, palaces, huts, temples, gates and fountains which may contain creatures or magic that harm the player or provides respite and refreshment. These features may also provide access to the underground tunnel world beneath the Icemark which would otherwise inaccessible.

Within the Icemark, there are many magic items to be found, most belonging to a single lord and having 'power in battle'. Also, there are useful objects in the form of magic crowns, which may aid in the task of recruiting Lords. Runes may provide protection or the ability to be swifter in travel; in some cases, these objects may summon enemies or allow travel to a particular location.

Doomdark's Revenge reverses the first game's victory conditions by giving the computer only a single goal, the death of the main protagonist Luxor. The player has many possible levels of victory, ranging from the simple rescue of Luxor's son Morkin from Shareth's spell of enchantment and retreat to Midnight, to the complete destruction of Shareth and the safe return home of Luxor, Morkin, as well as Luxor's companions Rorthron and Tarithel.

== Plot ==
After Doomdark the Witchking was destroyed in the first game, word reaches his daughter, Shareth the Heartstealer, the dreaded Empress of the Frozen Empire of Icemark who is as evil as she is beautiful and powerful. Enraged by the news, she decides to take revenge on the chief architect of her father's downfall, Luxor the Moonprince, by bewitching and kidnapping his son Morkin. The game revolves around Luxor and his companions Rorthron the Wise and Morkin's beloved Tarithel the Fey, and their attempts to rescue Morkin and defeat Shareth.

Canonically, Tarithel found Morkin and broke Shareth's spell with a single kiss. Shareth's armies have been defeated and she herself has been slain in the great final battle. However, Shareth's and Morkin's union has created a son named Anderlane, who was later born from a surrogate mother.

== Release ==
The game's publisher Beyond Software offered a prize - models of the major characters in an Icemark setting - to the first player who revealed the "Watchwords of Midnight", an inscription on Luxor's Moon Ring that would be shown upon ultimate victory. The conditions for this to happen was if the player could bring all the major characters including Morkin to the Gate of Varenorn and eliminate Shareth. The first to do so was then-15-year-old Richard Harris from Lowestoft in November 1984. Harris, however, had to wait for the models for 14 months - until January 1986 - because the publisher had not expected anyone to "finish the game so quickly".

Doomdark's Revenge was adapted into a Fighting Fantasy-style gamebook type game by Beyond Software's Clive Bailey and Terry Pratt that was serialized in three parts in Computer and Video Games magazine. The first part, published in the December 1984 issue, follows Luxor to the Frozen Gates that lead into Icemark. In the second part, Tarithel makes her way through Icemark to the pit of Alazorne, where Morkin is held captive. In the final part, the freed Morkin sets on his own quest to find and kill the evil Shareth.

A novelisation of Doomdark's Revenge by Drew Wagar was published in December 2021.

== Reception ==
Reception

Award
Publication	Award
Amstrad Action	Mastergame

Doomdark's Revenge was very well received by game critics and public alike. Amstrad Action gave it a review score of 95%, calling it a "true classic".In 1993, readers of Your Sinclair voted it the 71st best game of all time.

== The Eye of the Moon ==
Originally the series was conceived as a trilogy, with the third part titled The Eye of the Moon. The sequel is even mentioned in the game's manual: "The third part of the trilogy, possibly the most exciting yet, is still to come, when Mike will send Morkin down to the warmer lands which lie below Midnight itself, to find the Eye of the Moon". The Eye of the Moon was to be a magical crystal, or jewel, that allowed its owner to look into the future. According to Singleton: "Luxor is dying, it's some years on and he's reached the end of his tether, and he wants to see what is going to happen to Midnight in the future. So Morkin goes off in search of the magical jewel called the Eye of the Moon which enables people to see into the future, so that Luxor can then rest in peace". Some of Singleton's plans included a game canvas four times bigger than the original Lords of Midnight, divided into twelve kingdoms set south-west of the original game, dynamic full-color graphics with black masking to hide any color clashes, unique graphics for all castles, unique, generated, full-scale facial graphics for all characters, a more convincing name generator, interior scenes of keeps and citadels, et cetera. There were even tentative plans to implement a multiplayer mode, using the already existing mic/ear sockets to exchange data. Despite having already created a substantial amount of new game code, Singleton was involved in numerous other game projects at the time and thus put the game on hiatus.

In an article published in July 1985 in Computer Gamer, Singleton disclosed quite a lot of details of the game. The game was to have 16,000 locations and 131,000 unique views, created with a new technique called Randscaping. The Randscaping engine made every view unique. In multiplayer mode, the two players would each control either Morkin or Tarithel on their quest to find the fabled jewel. His new Midnight Identikit could create personalized faces for all the 256 NPCs roaming the canvas. Some of the NPCs were to have unique capabilities; for instance, one character would have the magic ability to flatten mountains, and was to be a critical recruitment for one of the mini-quests, allowing the player access beyond an impassable mountain range to retrieve an item. Another NPC could control the weather, and so on. At the start of the game, the player(s) would only be able to control Morkin and Tarithel, recruiting more characters to their cause as the game progresses. The recruited characters could be made part of teams headed by a character chosen by the player, making moving the characters around the playing field a lot easier. The last attempt by Singleton to get the game released was in April 1989.

Today there exists no authentic material for The Eye of the Moon. Some presentation mock-ups were created by Singleton; all still available screenshots—if any—are from these faked mock-ups. While the most serious intention of both Singleton and publisher Domark indeed was to create this third part, the sequel was later indefinitely shelved, partly due to Singleton's other commitments and partly due to the original publisher being bought out by Telecomsoft. Because of this, the new management wanted to change the terms of agreement, demanding two distinct versions of the game - 8-bit and 16-bit versions - instead of one. Singleton refused the new agreement. The Eye of the Moon has since been mentioned for a possible upcoming release. With Singleton again involved, a significant amount of work had already taken place, but after his death all development on the sequel ceased, with the consensus that "it shall always remain a myth or a legend". Doomdark's Revenge would, however, be followed many years later by another sequel, Lords of Midnight: The Citadel.
