= Lords of Midnight: The Citadel =

1995 video game

- Developer(s): Maelstrom Games
- Publisher(s): Domark
- Producer(s): Hugh F. Batterbury
- Designer(s): Mike Singleton; Paul A. Hodgson; David Ollman; James Shaw
- Artist(s): Andrew Elkerton; Stuart Flint
- Composer(s): Paul Robotham
- Platform(s): MS-DOS
- Release: EU: 1995; NA: 1995
- Genre(s): Strategy
- Mode(s): Single-player, multiplayer

Lords of Midnight: The Citadel (also known simply as Lords of Midnight) is the second and final sequel to the classic ZX Spectrum game The Lords of Midnight by Mike Singleton. It was developed by Maelstrom Games and published by Domark in 1995. It was distributed by Spectrum HoloByte in North America.

The sequel departs quite radically from its predecessors, abandoning the previous installments' turn-based movement and opting for real-time 3D movement.

== Gameplay ==
The character switching from the previous games is still present, although character movement is different. Game characters can be given autonomous tasks and these are then executed independently by the game engine, without further need of player input.

== Development ==
Computer Gaming World reported in March 1994 of "gossip and rumor in the ether—talk of a new Mike Singleton game, the third part of Lords of Midnight" and possibly named Eye of Doom.

The Citadel is a direct continuation of Doomdark's Revenge. Morkin's father, Luxor the Moonprince, who by now is an old man, sets off on a quest to find the fabled Eye of the Moon. During his quest he is captured by Boroth Wolfheart and imprisoned in a Citadel. The main quest is to aid Morkin in finding and freeing his captured father.

Some storyline details were changed from what had been issued as the story for the Eye of the Moon, such as the game canvas being set in the Blood March, now located south-east of Midnight, instead of south-west as the original. Further, the original story had Luxor set Morkin out on the quest for the Eye of the Moon, whereas the story of The Citadel had Luxor already captured. Game designer Singleton explained the continuity error by stating the events of The Citadel take place some 20 years prior to the events in the Eye of the Moon.

== Reviews ==
- Australian Realms #25
