= Michael Bywater =

British writer and broadcaster (1953–2025)

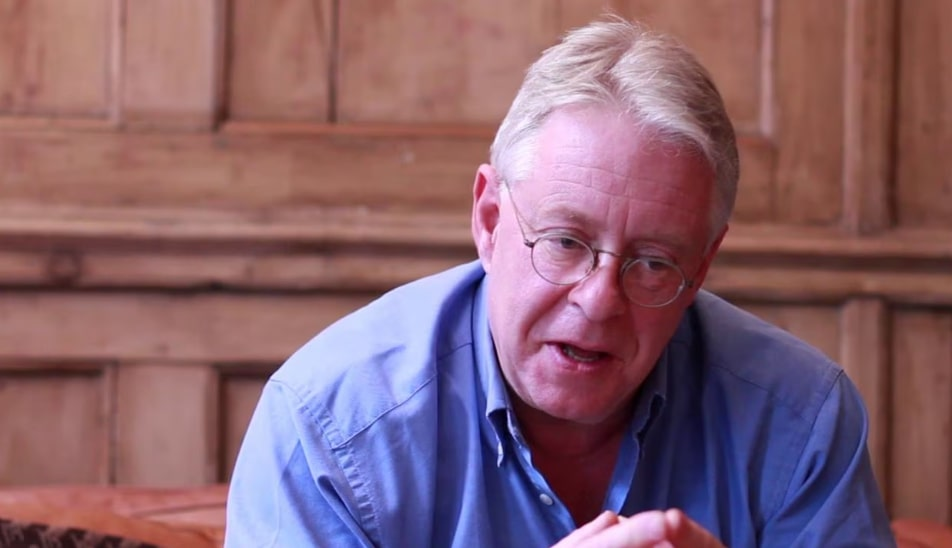
- Born: 11 May 1953; Nottingham, England
- Died: 24 August 2025 (aged 72)
- Occupations: Writer; Columnist; Broadcaster
- Children: 1

Michael Bywater (11 May 1953 – 24 August 2025) was a British writer, columnist, cultural critic and broadcaster. He contributed to publications including The Times, The Independent on Sunday, The Observer, and numerous other newspapers & magazines.

== Early life and education ==
Bywater was born in Nottingham, England, on (11 May 1953), to Jean and Keith Bywater, although he discovered later in life that his biological father was Bertold Wiesner. He was educated at Nottingham High School and later attended Corpus Christi College, Cambridge, initially studying medicine before switching to English. He also completed a postgraduate course in theatre performance studies at Cardiff University.

== Career ==
=== Journalism and broadcasting ===
Bywater spent more than ten years as a staff editor and columnist for Punch, where he sometimes wrote anonymously, including the "Bargepole" column, a caustic anonymous column targeting pop culture and politics with Swiftian satire. His work also appeared in The Independent on Sunday and The Daily Telegraph. Additionally, he wrote regularly for The Times, and was a contributing editor at Cosmopolitan and Woman's Journal. Bywater was also a cultural critic for New Statesman, and an early futurist for The Observer. He also wrote on technology for The Daily Telegraph and several technology magazines. Bywater was a cultural critic for the New Statesman. In 1998, he took part in BBC Radio 4's political satire programme Cartoons, Lampoons, and Buffoons, which ran for five episodes.

He supervised students at several Cambridge colleges for the Tragedy paper in the English Faculty and, in 2006, he was the writer-in-residence at Magdalene College, Cambridge. Bywater suggested that he inspired Douglas Adams's character Dirk Gently.

Bywater was once identified as a young fogey. In The Young Fogey Handbook Suzanne Lowry writes: "Michael Bywater, 30-year-old Punch columnist and former trendy, who once worked in films, made bold to criticise Burberrys for the inferior quality of their product - the trench coats are not what they were in the days of the trenches. Burberrys responded that they could indeed live up to their past and made Bywater a coat based on the 1915 design devised by Kitchener and Burberry that complete with camel hair lining to protect a gentleman officer's flesh on the field..."

=== Books ===
Bywater's works include:

- Lost Worlds (2004) – essays on aspects of life and culture that have disappeared from modern society
- Big Babies (2006) – on the infantilization of Western culture
- The Chronicles of Bargepole – a collection of his Punch columns

=== Interactive fiction ===
Bywater co-wrote interactive fiction games with Douglas Adams such as Bureaucracy, the unreleased Milliways, and Starship Titanic. He also collaborated with Anita Sinclair on Jinxter for Magnetic Scrolls.

=== Academic involvement ===
Bywater held teaching and residency posts at Magdalene College, Cambridge and King's College, Cambridge, and supervised courses on tragedy for the Cambridge English Tripos.

== Personal life and death ==
Bywater was a harpsichordist, an organist and a qualified pilot. He had one daughter. He worked on a musical libretto based on the life of Oscar Wilde with songwriter Mike Stoller.

Bywater died from Lewy body dementia on 24 August 2025, at the age of 72.

== Games, books and music ==
In the mid-1980s Bywater co-designed and co-wrote several interactive fiction games. He collaborated with Douglas Adams on Bureaucracy and the never-completed Milliways: The Restaurant At The End Of The Universe for Infocom. He also collaborated with Anita Sinclair on Jinxter for Magnetic Scrolls. In the late 1990s, he contributed to the writing team for Douglas Adams's Starship Titanic.

His book Lost Worlds, which explores the human tendency for nostalgia, was released in 2004. His subsequent book, Big Babies, on the infantilization of Western culture, was published in November 2006.

Bywater played the church organ with Gary Brooker for the "Within Our House" charity concert.
