= The Wild Bunch (video game) =

1984 video game

- Developer: Firebird Software
- Publisher: Firebird Software
- Platforms: Amstrad CPC, ZX Spectrum
- Release: NA: 1984
- Genre: Adventure
- Mode: Single-player

The Wild Bunch is a computer game released in 1984 for the ZX Spectrum and 1985 for the Amstrad CPC by Firebird Software. Despite its name, it has no relation to the 1969 film but is set in the Wild West. The title refers to a fictitious gang of outlaws featured in the game, loosely based on the real Wild Bunch gang who were prominent in the 1890s.

The game music is the cowboy ballad "Streets of Laredo".

== Gameplay ==
The Wild Bunch is a text-based adventure game, with limited use of graphics. The player controls a protagonist who finds a dying man who was attacked by a member of the Wild Bunch gang. Before dying he describes the culprit and gives the player his Colt 45, just as the local sheriff arrives on the scene. The player is assumed to be the murderer and the sheriff tries to arrest them, but they escape. The object of the game is to prove the protagonist's innocence by tracking down the real murderer and handing him over to the law. Along the way the player can also arrest and hand in other members of the gang, whose descriptions are obtained from wanted posters. Scoring is based on the money earned from rewards, gambling at poker or finding gold nuggets while travelling. The game ends if the protagonist dies due to their strength reaching zero, they are killed in a gunfight or are arrested. It is, however, won by successfully tracing, identifying and handing in the real murderer, which usually involves not killing him in a gunfight but taking him in at gunpoint.

At all times during the game the player is pursued by Charles A. Siringo of the Pinkerton Detective Agency. Charlie Siringo was a real life lawman during the time that the game was set, though the game is not based on any true story.

At the start of the game, the player can choose to start off in one of five towns. Each town has a number of premises which can be visited to obtain information about the Wild Bunch gang and how to avoid being arrested. The player can also earn money by playing poker, increase their strength by drinking in the saloon bar or buy items of use in the store. The player can travel between towns (journey time is reduced by buying a horse and saddle). When travelling, food and water are consumed on a daily basis and each day the player runs a risk of encountering enemies which must be dealt with by fleeing, fighting or bribing them. Random events such as sandstorm, rockslides and even the player's horse going lame will increase journey times. Running out of food or water reduces the player's strength and their horse can also die from this. The traveling environment will affect the supplies used. While in the plains the player's horse does not consume horse food or water, apparently finding sufficient from the plains. While traveling through the mountains or deserts, however, the player will consume water from canteens and their horse will consume horse food. If their horse runs out of food in the mountains the game will comment: "Horses don't eat rocks". If their horse runs out of food in the desert the game will comment: "Horses don't eat sand". The player's own food will decrease regardless of the terrain being traveled. When first arriving in a new town, there is a risk of being arrested, although if this is avoided it is possible to stay in the town for as long as is needed. This risk is somewhat mitigated by visiting the telegraph office before setting out to see which town the player's pursuer is currently staying in. This may change while the player travels.

The game has three levels of difficulty to choose from and allows the player to choose a name for the character they control. The difficulty level is tied directly to how long Charles A. Siringo stays in one town looking for the player. On the hardest difficulty level he seems to stay put for no more than three days, meaning that even if the player checks the telegraph office there is a strong chance he has moved to a new town before the player's own journey completes.
