= The Pawn (video game) =

1985 video game

- C64 cover art
- Developer: Magnetic Scrolls
- Publishers: Sinclair Research, Rainbird Software
- Designer: Rob Steggles
- Platforms: Amiga, Amstrad CPC, Amstrad PCW, Apple II, Archimedes, Atari ST, Atari 8-bit, Commodore 64, MS-DOS, Mac, Sinclair QL, ZX Spectrum
- Release: 1985: Sinclair QL; 1986: Apple II, Amiga, Atari ST, C64; 1987: Spectrum
- Genre: Interactive fiction
- Mode: Single-player

The Pawn is an interactive fiction game for the Sinclair QL written by Rob Steggles of Magnetic Scrolls and published by Sinclair Research in 1985. In 1986, graphics were added and the game was released for additional home computers by Rainbird.

== Plot ==
Opening screen (C64)

First graphical screen (C64)

The player's character is knocked unconscious and awakens in the fairyland of Kerovnia. A silver bracelet around their wrist cannot be removed. A general election is about to be held to decide if King Erik will be replaced by a dwarf whose campaign promise is to "rid dungeons of mazes of any sort". The character must interact with others and perform tasks for them, gathering objects that will be needed for later tasks in order to escape from Kerovnia and return to reality.

== Development ==
The Pawn was written by Rob Steggles at Magnetic Scrolls in 1985, and a text-only version was first published for the Sinclair QL that same year. After Magnetic Scrolls secured a publication deal with Rainbird, a graphical version was then released for other platforms in 1986.

The game is written in 68000 assembler. Later versions use a cut-down 68000 virtual machine on less powerful machines like the Z80-based Sinclair Spectrum. The Amiga version uses digitized instrument samples in its title music early in that computer's lifecycle. The title music was composed by John Molloy and it features guitar and flute sounds.

== Reception ==
Reception

Awards
Publication	Award
Crash	Crash Smash
Sinclair User	SU Classic

By late 1987, The Pawn was Firebird's second best-selling Amiga game in the United States. Reviewers complimented it for its excellent graphics and the opening music available in some game versions. The game itself–story and parser–got mostly positive reviews.

- In the October 1986 edition of Compute!, Neil Randall described The Pawn as "parod[ying] the entire genre of interactive fiction, showing us that much of it — even the serious stuff — has its shortcomings", giving as example a character campaigning to eliminate mazes in text adventures. Randall commented that some of the Atari ST version's graphics were "superb", but wished the pictures contributed to solving the game instead of being optional. He concluded by saying "Firebird has given us a good adventure, one that bodes well for the company and for all of us adventurers".
- In the December 1986 edition of Computer Gaming World, Roy Wagner stated that The Pawn "shows how well something can be done for the Amiga when one KNOWS the machine". Roy Wagner reviewed the game for Computer Gaming World, and stated that "Both humor and challenge are present here, two of the key elements of any good adventure (along with an excellent parser and outstanding presentation)."
- In the January–February 1987 edition of Info, Benn Dunnington gave the Amiga version four-plus stars out of five, praising the "excellent graphics" and text parser. Dunnington concluded, "The Pawn's story is good, the characters are interesting, and the play is entertaining".
- In the July 1987 edition of Commodore Magazine, Shay Adams thought the game's sophisticated parser "handily parses circles around every American counterpart except Infocom's - and it's not far behind that one." Adams was also very impressed by the plot, saying, "The Pawn also delivers well-honed prose, vivid graphics, innovative visual effects, and dozens of puzzles - some diabolically difficult, others deceptively simple - in an imaginative story." He concluded with a strong recommendation: "Technically and creatively, this is England's all-time best adventure game. For advanced players, The Pawn is a must whether you prefer text or graphic adventures."

Two reviews of the game appeared in Dragon:

- In the October 1986 edition, Hartley and Pattie Lesser stated that the Atari ST version's "'painted' scenes will leave you in awe". They also praised the "sophisticated language parser" and thought "the intriguing plot" would be "extremely appealing to all gamers".
- In the June 1988 edition, Hartley, Patricia, and Kirk Lesser reviewed the IBM PC and PC compatible version, commenting that since their previous review, The Pawn "is steadily pushing toward the status of becoming a classic adventure." The Lessers thought highly of the game, saying, "The Pawn is not only great for experienced adventurers, but because of the interactivity of the scenario’s characters, it also enables novice gamers to learn as they progress through the land of Kerovnia. This is certainly one offering that any computer-game library should contain." They gave the game an above average rating of 4 out of 5 stars if played on an IBM PC or compatible equipped with an Enhanced Graphics Adapter EGA board, but only 2½ stars for systems without an EGA board.

=== Awards ===
In 1988, readers of Crash voted The Pawn "Best Adventure Game of the Year".

It was also "Best Adventure Game of the Year" at the 1987 Golden Joystick Awards.
