= Wonderland (video game) =

1990 video game

- Developer: Magnetic Scrolls
- Publisher: Virgin Games
- Designer: David Bishop
- Platforms: MS-DOS, Archimedes, Amiga, Atari ST
- Release: 1990: MS-DOS; 1991: Amiga, Archimedes, ST
- Genre: Interactive fiction
- Mode: Single-player

Wonderland, is an interactive fiction game developed by Magnetic Scrolls based on Lewis Carroll's Alice in Wonderland. It was published by Virgin Games for MS-DOS in 1990, then for Amiga, Atari ST, and Acorn Archimedes in 1991. While playing as Alice, the player goes on a journey solving puzzles in order to find the way back home from Wonderland. With numerous locations to explore, the game introduced characters from the original book to help with the journey in Wonderland. First introducing the magnetic windows system, Wonderland received positive reviews upon release.

== Gameplay ==
In this game, Magnetic Scrolls introduced a bespoke windowing system dubbed "Magnetic Windows". The player's inventory, the location's graphic, the map and so on are all in separate windows that can be moved and resized independently. (A similar system is used in unrelated adventure games such as Deja Vu.) The developers believed it would make the game more accessible, giving it a wider appeal.

== Development ==
Development began in December 1987, when David Bishop pitched the concept to Scrolls' Anita Sinclair. Bishop would become project manager.

== Reception ==
Reception

Review scores
| Publication | Score |
|---|---|
| CU Amiga | 96% |
| Zero | 95/100 |
| ACE | 910/1000 |

Computer Gaming World favorably reviewed the game's graphics and interface, describing it as "a satisfying romp through Wonderland ... fun stuff to play". ACE gave the IBM PC version a score of 910 out of 1000, praising the puzzles, interface (if used with a mouse) and the graphics, with the lack of sound being a negative point. Keith Campbell of CU Amiga called it "an outstanding game that is a pleasure to play, extremely entertaining, and with widespread appeal to gamesters from nine years of age to ninety." In Zero, Mike Gerrard wrote that it is "a very open adventure, designed to appeal to people who maybe haven't tried an adventure before. Regular adventures will try it and love it, but newcomers will find it very accessible and easy to play... if not easy to solve." He strongly praised its presentation and ease of use, calling its window interface "wondrous".

Reviewing Wonderland for Amiga World, Peter Olafson summarized, "Frankly, the game is an almost unalloyed delight." He praised its graphics, music and interface, and found its difficulty level to be fair. Olafson believed that the game was "destined to restore interest in [the] sadly vanishing genre" of interactive fiction. In PC Magazine, Cristina Córdova wrote that "Wonderland brings the best of text-based and graphics-based games to Alice and her adventures." She praised it for combining the "complexity and detail" of interactive fiction with visuals, and commended the ease-of-use of its interface.

Strategy Plus's Theo Clark noted Wonderland had received significant hype prior to release, and believed the game lived up to these expectations. He praised its interface and parser, calling them "very close to ... ideal." While he was let down by the limited music, he found the visuals to be "a feast" and enjoyed the hint system. He concluded, "If the purchasing public has any sense at all the sales should be brisk enough to ensure a rapid start to a sequel." The magazine's editors later named Wonderland the best adventure game of 1990, other nominees including The Secret of Monkey Island. Editor-in-Chief Brian Walker wrote, "Witty, charming, and of course, with a wonderful storyline, it proved that the text adventure is not dead after all." He believed that it was "destined to be a classic of its kind."

In 1991, PC Format placed Wonderland on its list of the 50 best computer games of all time. The editors described it as "a very impressive windowing system that takes you through Wonderland in the company of Alice and cronies."
