= Dark Sceptre =

1987 video game

- Developers: Maelstrom Games (Mike Singleton, David Gautrey, Alan Jardine) for Beyond Software
- Publisher: Firebird Software
- Platforms: ZX Spectrum, Amstrad CPC
- Release: 1987
- Genres: Adventure game, Strategy
- Mode: Single player

Dark Sceptre is a strategy adventure video game by Mike Singleton's design team Maelstrom Games, for Beyond Software. It was published by Firebird Software for the ZX Spectrum in 1987 and for the Amstrad CPC in 1988.

== Gameplay ==
The task in Dark Sceptre is to recover the eponymous artefact. The player controls a company of warriors by assigning them specific tasks, and is hindered by six other computer-controlled factions. The main display shows a side-view of the currently watched warrior, which scrolls and tracks him as he moves through the game world. Each warrior has a rank, ranging from Thane, the team leader, to Thrall, the pawn of the game. Other ranks include Mystics, Heralds, Savages and Assassins.

Play is real-time, with the player pausing to issue commands in Plan mode and then viewing results in Watch mode. Commands are selected from a menu screen and range from character-targeting actions such as KILL, AVOID, BRIBE or STALK, object related actions like SEEK, TAKE, USE, or location-based actions like DEFEND or ROAM.

Umbrarg's Reaper fighting one of the player's Thralls at the beginning of the game. The Reaper is carrying the Dark Sceptre.

== Critical reception ==
Reception

Awards
Publication	Award
Sinclair User	SU Classic
Your Sinclair	Megagame

Dark Sceptre was well received by critics on its release. Your Sinclair awarded Dark Sceptre 9 out of 10, highlighting "nifty graphics and sound" and the easy-to-play design. Sinclair User awarded it 10 out of 10, also impressed with the menu system, with the large variety of commands opening up an "almost infinite" number of strategies. The reviewer felt it was fascinating to issue commands and then watch what happens, concluding that it was an original and dramatic game. CRASH magazine awarded it 88%, highlighting the large, animated sprites that avoided the Spectrum's attribute clash. The only criticism was with the lack of detailed instructions, with the reviewer spending a lot of time trying to discover the objective of the game and working out which characters are best to befriend.

== Other versions ==
Maelstrom Games had also designed a play by mail version of Dark Sceptre. Players sent in their turns via ZX Microdrive cartridge, whilst Singleton adjudicated the whole game. This version of the software allowed two modes of display: Replay and Simulation. Replay allowed the player to select a character and watch events that occurred since his last turn, whilst Simulation predicts the events in the game based on the player's orders to his warriors.
