= The Arc of Yesod =

1985 video game

- Cover art
- Developer: Odin Computer Graphics
- Publisher: Thor Computer Software
- Platforms: ZX Spectrum, Commodore 64
- Release: 1985
- Genre: Platform
- Mode: Single-player

Arc of Yesod is a video game by Odin Computer Graphics. It was published in 1985 for the ZX Spectrum and Commodore 64 and is the sequel to Nodes of Yesod.

== Plot ==
The Monolith (a homage to the film 2001: A Space Odyssey) which was the object of the previous game, Nodes of Yesod, teleported off into space just as Charlemagne 'Charlie' Fotheringham-Grunes was completing his quest. He has followed it to its home planet of Ariat and must now finally destroy it, before the Ariatians download the data it has collected and employ it to destroy the Earth.

== Gameplay ==
The game is similar in style to previous game Nodes of Yesod. Charlie must penetrate the alien city where the Monolith is being held, via a network of caves and tunnels, and make his way to the Security Centre, where the Monolith can be disarmed and destroyed.

== Reception ==
Crash magazine reviewed the game and despite noting its similarity to previous title Nodes of Yesod, they found it "very playable" and "addictive", and gave it a rating of 89%.
