= Qube Software =

British 3D technology company

- Founded: 1998
- Founder: Servan Keondjian; Hugh Steers; Doug Rabson
- Headquarters: London, United Kingdom

Qube Software is a British company specialising in advanced 3D technology. It was founded in 1998 by Servan Keondjian, Hugh Steers, and Doug Rabson who created the Reality Lab renderer and who subsequently played a leading role at Microsoft turning it into Direct3D.

Qube Software has produced games, however, its main focus has been the development of 3D software that would address the key problems with 3D middleware Keondjian says he identified during his years working on Reality Lab and Direct3D.

== History ==
Rabson and Keondjian met in the late 1980s, as employees of the British video games company Magnetic Scrolls. Along with Rabson and Kate Seekings, Keondjian subsequently co-founded RenderMorphics to allow him to follow his interest in 3D technology, an interest he attributes in part to the ground-breaking Elite series of games published in the mid 1980s.

RenderMorphics developed and released Reality Lab, a real-time 3D application programming interface (API) aimed at the PC. Its main selling point was predicated on the claim that it was faster than any of its contemporaries. From early 1995, Microsoft moved aggressively to acquire RenderMorphics with the deal being announced in late February of that year. By doing so, Microsoft signaled its intention to target the fast-growing video games market by ensuring that its Windows OS provided a platform for games.

Keondjian, Rabson and Seekings joined Microsoft as part of the deal, with Keondjian leading the efforts to integrate Reality Lab with the upcoming Windows 95 release. With Rabson's help, Reality Lab became Direct3D, the preeminent component in Microsoft's DirectX suite of APIs.

Having shipped the first three iterations of Direct3D, Keondjian and Rabson left Microsoft in 1997. Keondjian then set up Qube Software, initially with Hugh Steers, one of the founders of Magnetic Scrolls, later joined by Doug Rabson who had taken time out to work on FreeBSD.

Qube's goal was to build 3D software that solved most of the issues that had become apparent during the Reality Lab and Direct3D development period.

Steers eventually left to pursue a range of personal software interests while the team grew with the addition of Peter Jeffrey and Jamie Fowlston.

The first iteration of the resulting software appeared as Q 1.0, used on projects for clients including the BBC and Lego while the second, Q 2.0, was launched in February 2008.

== 'Q' technology ==
Qube’s technology platform is called Q. Qube has variously described Q as a ‘game engine,’ a ‘technology development platform’ and an ‘interoperability standard’. Founder Servan Keondjian cites Q’s architecture as the platform's key innovation; a pluggable framework to which modular components or even script languages can be added via common APIs.

"In particular, we wanted to let people blow out any component from the lowest level all the way to the very high level, so even the networking libraries and input libraries are pluggable, the scripting's pluggable -- everything's a completely pluggable framework for developing games," Keondjian told Gamasutra in a 2008 interview.

The company claims that Q’s architecture makes ports to different platforms a relatively trivial task. According to games industry media projects, using Q have reportedly been undertaken for the PC, Wii, PS2, PS3 while Qube says its compatibility extends to any system making use of floating point technology (i.e. excluding the GBA and DS) and has implied that Xbox360, PSP and iPhone ports are either complete, underway or can be implemented.

Q has been touted as an ‘in house’ solution for games studios as it allows original code to be plugged into the system offering licensees the freedom to focus on creating specific tools and features for games projects without having to build an entire engine to accommodate them.
