= Scary Monsters (video game) =

1986 video game

- Platform: Commodore 64
- Release: 1986

Scary Monsters is a 1986 video game for the Commodore 64.

== Gameplay ==
The gameplay in Scary Monsters centers on Harry Johns, an all-American football hero, navigating an island to rescue Conny from Dr. Graves. The island is populated by six monsters resembling classic horror figures: Dracula, Frankenstein's monster, the Mummy, the Wolfman, a zombie, and a witch. Players begin with a map view showing Harry moving between buildings. Harry must fight off swarms of witches and phantoms. Combat involves continuous firing with unlimited ammo and strategic use of a Smart bomb that clears enemies temporarily. To defeat each monster, Harry must locate a specific object, which is often in a different building than the monster itself. Once the correct item is used, a gravestone icon appears and the player earns 10,000 points. Monsters and items are randomly placed each game. Gameplay alternates between action-packed interior combat and slower exterior navigation, with repeated searches for buildings and items across the island.

== Reception ==
Bill Scolding for Commodore User said that "This is a real Frankenstein's monster of a game - a peculiar creation cobbled together from bits and pieces, sometimes dramatic and sometimes pathetic, lurching about lookin for an identity..." Computer and Video Games said "There is no menace as great as looming boredom!" ASM (Aktueller Software Markt) gave it a score of 8. Tilt gave it a B.
