= Robin of the Wood =

1985 video game

- Developers: Steve Wetherill; Paul Salmon; Stuart Fotheringham; Marc Wilding; Fred Gray
- Publisher: Odin Computer Graphics
- Release: 1985
- Genres: Maze, action-adventure
- Mode: Single-player

Screenshot

Robin of the Wood is a maze-based action-adventure video game published in 1985 for the ZX Spectrum and Commodore 64 by Odin Computer Graphics in the UK and Serma Software in Spain. It is based on the English legend of Robin Hood.

== Reception ==
Reception

Award
Publication	Award
Crash	Smash

Crash magazine awarded the game 94%, giving it a Crash Smash, and called it the "most addictive" game they had played, whilst also recommending this title for fans of maze games.
