= The Lords of Midnight =

1984 epic fantasy video game

- European cover art
- Developers: Mike Singleton; Chris Wild (remake)
- Publishers: Beyond Software (SPEC); Amsoft (CPC); Mindscape (C64)
- Platforms: ZX Spectrum, Amstrad CPC, Commodore 64, iOS, Android, OS X, Windows, BlackBerry OS
- Release: ZX Spectrum, Amstrad CPC: EU: 1984; Commodore 64: EU: 1985; NA: 1985; Remake iOS: WW: 28 October 2012; Android: WW: 11 January 2013; OS X: WW: 5 July 2012; Microsoft Windows: WW: 12 July 2013; BlackBerry OS: WW: 28 October 2013
- Genres: Role-playing, wargame
- Mode: Single-player

The Lords of Midnight is an epic fantasy video game combining aspects of wargames and graphic adventures, written by Mike Singleton and originally released in 1984 for the ZX Spectrum. Well received from the beginning, it was soon converted for the Amstrad CPC and Commodore 64. The game featured an innovative 3-D effect that Singleton called landscaping, which served to bring the player into the game much more than usual. The player must destroy Doomdark, the evil Witchking who has locked the Land of Midnight in perpetual winter. There are multiple ways in which this can be achieved. It was followed by Doomdark's Revenge also in 1984, and Lords of Midnight: The Citadel in 1995.

== Gameplay ==
The Lords of Midnight is a strategy/role-playing game hybrid. The player starts with four characters (Luxor the Moonprince, Rorthron the Wise, Corleth the Fey, and Morkin, Luxor's son), and then has the option to recruit up to twenty-eight further characters (such as Lords Blood, Ithrorn, Xajorkith, Shadows, etc. plus the Utarg of Utarg, Farflame the Dragon Lord and Fawkrin the Skulkrin) to join in the quest to destroy Doomdark, the evil Witchking who has locked the Land of Midnight in perpetual winter.

The game can be played in three ways, firstly as a straight adventure game, where the goal is for Morkin to destroy the Ice Crown, the source of Doomdark's power. The second is as a wargame, recruiting other lords and their armies until they are strong enough to defeat Doomdark's armies and storm his citadel in the far north. A third variation, referred to in the manual as the 'Epic', requires the player to complete the game both ways simultaneously.

The player has an advantage in that only one of the two objectives is needed to defeat Doomdark. The game is won whenever the Ice Crown is destroyed or when Doomdark's home citadel of Ushgarak falls. For Doomdark to win, he has to complete two objectives. First, he must kill Morkin, Luxor's son, since as long as Morkin is alive, the game continues. Also, he must subdue the armies of the Free, either by killing Luxor or by conquering Xajorkith, the capital citadel of the Free lands.

The game featured a groundbreaking technique called landscaping to depict the lands of Midnight from a first-person perspective. Also, even after completion the game may be enjoyed numerous times, since each time Doomdark's armies can attack from different routes and do not always follow the same pattern.

At the time of its release Singleton thought there was no way to defeat Doomdark before Xajorkith fell. Gamers quickly proved him wrong, and even now various Internet groups devoted to the game continue to refine their strategies to defeat Doomdark.

Crash published a four-page map of the game in 1984. Hungarian computer magazine CoV also published a full-detailed map, along with a walkthrough in their 19th issue.

== Development ==
The 3D effect used in the game was achieved by "billboarding" (see sprite) pre-scaled images of mountains, forests, buildings, etc. to create the impression of a perspective-correct landscape scene, available from a view of 8 points of the compass; the technique was self-described as "landscaping". This innovation created a strong impression at the time, and the game received high praise for its graphics; "landscaping" was also used in the sequel Doomdark's Revenge, but did not see significant further use in other games.

Singleton designed the game, wrote the novella/manual, and developed "landscaping" in the last three months of 1983. He wrote the code in the first three months of 1984 and the game he submitted to the software house in April was entirely his own product.

== Reception ==
Reception

Award
Publication	Award
Crash	Crash Smash

CRASH awarded Lords of Midnight 10 out of 10 in the adventure column, highlighting the panoramic views, detailed units and "wonderfully coherent" storyline. The game won the award for best adventure game of the year according to CRASH readers.

Lyndsey Paton reviewed The Lords of Midnight for White Dwarf #60, and wrote that "this should provide a sustained challenge for the experienced adventure gamer, and a complex and absorbing introduction to the complete novice".

Zzap!64 rated it at 91%, calling it "truly an epic game ... a must for adventurers and strategists alike", although one of the three reviewers expressed disappointment that the Commodore 64 version's graphics did not improve on the Spectrum original. It was also Best Strategy Game of the Year at the Golden Joystick Awards.

== Legacy ==
A sequel titled Doomdark's Revenge took place in a land north of Midnight called the Icemark. The object was to defeat the daughter of Doomdark, who sought revenge against Luxor for her father's death.

The planned final installment of the trilogy, The Eye of the Moon, was never released.

Lords of Midnight: The Citadel was released for the PC platform much later, but did not repeat the original's success, as by then graphics had become more advanced.

The original games have been adapted for the PC by Chris Wild and can be found online together with source code generated by disassembly.

There has also been some work into creating a new modernized version of The Lords of Midnight for iPhones and iPads, with a collaboration between the original author of the game, and the author of the game ports for Windows, Chris Wild. Following Singleton's death on 10 October 2012, the new version was released on iOS the same month, followed by Windows, Android and BlackBerry versions in 2013.

As part of the release of the ZX Spectrum Next in 2020, a port of The Lords of Midnight was made by Matt Davies and Simon Butler was made based on Singleton's original code.

=== Novelisation ===
Upon its release, Beyond Software, the publishers of the game, offered to turn the campaign of the first person to offer proof of completing the game into a published novel. While there were not many ways of offering proof that the campaign was completed, many players sent reams of thermal printer paper to Beyond, hoping to get their campaign published. The first person to send in their claim to victory did so within two weeks of the game's release. In the end, however, no publisher was interested in publishing what they deemed a fringe publication, and the offered prize was forfeit.

Tentative discussions were held, in which Singleton offered to write the novel himself. Ultimately time constraints and the reluctance on the publisher's part made all plans for a novel impossible.
