= Nodes of Yesod =

1985 video game

- Cover art
- Developer: Odin Computer Graphics
- Designers: Steve Wetherill; Colin Grunes; Stuart Fotheringham; Paul Salmon; Fred Gray
- Platforms: ZX Spectrum, Amstrad CPC, Commodore 64, Enterprise 64/128, iOS (Apple)
- Release: 1985
- Genres: Maze, platform
- Mode: Single-player

Nodes of Yesod is a video game developed and published by Odin Computer Graphics in 1985. The game is similar in style to Underwurlde by Ultimate Play the Game, which was released a year earlier. The game was released for the Amstrad CPC, Commodore 64, Elan Enterprise 64 and 128 and ZX Spectrum platforms. Versions were also planned for the BBC Micro and MSX platforms but these were cancelled.

On the ZX Spectrum, the game came in separate 48K and 128K versions. The latter had improved title-screen music, in-game music and additional synthesised speech.

== Plot ==
Charlemagne "Charlie" Fotheringham-Grunes, the apprentice saviour of the universe, has been asked to find the source of mysterious signals from the Moon, which turns out to be a black monolith. Charlie promptly volunteers for the task of going to the Moon and finding the monolith.

== Gameplay ==
Nodes of Yesod is a flick-screen platform game. The player controls Charlie Fotheringham-Grunes, an astronaut. Starting on the Moon's surface, Charlie must venture into the caverns below and retrieve eight alchiems (which look a little like coloured crystals) in order to find the monolith.

Charlie can perform a rolling jump in order to make his way around the caverns and can jump quite high, but falling from great heights is still dangerous and will cause him to lose a life.

Before venturing into the caverns, Charlie needs to search for a lunar mole on the moon's surface. Once he has collected one of these creatures, he can release it in the caverns when required and it will chew-through any walls it can, revealing new areas of the maze. The mole can also be used to destroy floating enemies on screen, but Charlie himself cannot move while controlling the mole and is vulnerable to attack, especially while it is eating through walls.

Once Charlie has collected an alchiem, it appears on his status panel at the bottom of the screen. There are "muggers" in the caverns (who look like red astronauts with jet packs). If one of these touches Charlie they will steal alchiems meaning Charlie will have to find them again.

There are two kinds of monster in Nodes of Yesod - harmful and non-harmful. The harmful creatures float around the caverns and will sap Charlie's strength if touched. The non-harmful creatures won't do Charlie any damage but will cause him to bounce around (similarly to the creatures in Underwurlde) and are thus a nuisance.

== Reception ==
Reception

Award
Publication	Award
Crash	Smash!

== Legacy ==
- The central character's double-barrelled surname is taken from the surnames of two of the artists - Stuart Fotheringham and Colin Grunes.
- According to Stuart Fotheringham, one of the artists and game designers on Nodes of Yesod, an earlier finished version of the map and screen layouts was created but was lost in a Microdrive crash and the maps and screens had to be recreated from scratch. He claims that the second, published, version was slightly inferior to the lost original.
- A sequel, The Arc of Yesod, was published later in 1986. A third game Heart of Yesod was planned for the 16bit market, but only made it as far as a tech demo and documentation.
- A "25th Anniversary Edition" was released in 2010 for the iPhone and iOS (Apple) devices. This version included a "classic mode" (similar to the original ZX Spectrum version) and an "enhanced mode", which featured new colour graphics, help system, map system, save/resume game feature and remixed music. A "30th Anniversary Edition" was released in 2016.
