= Reality Lab =

3D computer graphics API

Reality Lab was a 3D computer graphics API created by RenderMorphics to provide a standardized interface for writing games. It was one of the main contenders in the realtime 3D middleware marketplace at the time, alongside Criterion Software's RenderWare and Argonaut Software's BRender.

Reality Lab was a scene graph API providing real-time rendering that would run with acceptable performance on graphics cards or the host computer's CPU.

Founded in 1992 by Servan Keondjian, Doug Rabson and Kate Seekings, RenderMorphics was purchased by Microsoft in February 1995 and Reality Lab formed the basis for Direct3D. Microsoft's acquisition statement of RenderMorphics contained a description of Reality Lab:

RenderMorphics' flagship product, Reality Lab(TM), provides high-performance 3-D graphics technology for a variety of personal computer-based games and multimedia applications. Reality Lab has been acclaimed by a wide range of developers, including Autodesk, Creative Labs, Kaleida Labs and Virgin Entertainment.

Architecturally Reality Lab was then separated into a low layer immediate mode API and layered upon it the original scene graph API which was afterwards called retained mode API. Direct3D shipped for the first time in the DirectX 2.0 SDK in June 1996.

== See also ==
- Qube Software
- Glide
