= Telecomsoft =

British video game publisher

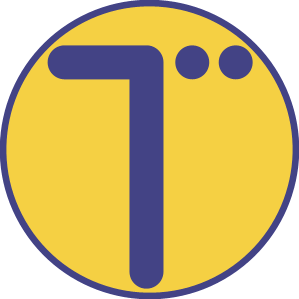
- Type: Division
- Industry: Video games
- Founded: 1984; 42 years ago
- Founder: Ederyn Williams
- Defunct: 9 May 1989
- Fate: Closed, labels sold
- Headquarters: London, England
- Brands: Firebird; Rainbird; Silverbird
- Parent: British Telecom

Telecomsoft was a British video game publisher and a division of British Telecom. The company was founded by Ederyn Williams in 1984 and operated three separate labels: Firebird, Rainbird, and Silverbird. The first employee was James Leavey, seconded from elsewhere in BT, who, along with Tony Rainbird, became the driving force behind the company in the early days.

== History ==
Telecomsoft was founded in 1984 when computer games were the fastest growing sector within the computer software market at the time. Despite a turnover of over £6 million in 1987/88, British Telecom sold the three labels to MicroProse in 1989 in a deal reported to be worth around £2,000,000 after a failed management buyout. MicroProse sold the Silverbird label soon after acquisition, but continued to use the Rainbird and Firebird labels for a short period.

== Labels ==
=== Firebird ===

British Telecom brought in Tony Rainbird, owner of budget software publisher Micro-Gold, to help set up the first Telecomsoft label, Firebird. Originally named Firefly Software, the label had to be renamed when it was discovered that the name had already been registered by another company.

The first titles to be published on the Firebird Silver label in November 1984 were The Wild Bunch for the ZX Spectrum, Booty for the Commodore 64 and Bird Strike for the BBC Micro.

Although there were doubts as to whether or not the market could afford to sustain a range of budget titles, the Firebird Silver releases were successful. In February 1985, Booty was the third best selling video game in the UK, behind only Ghostbusters and Daley Thompson's Decathlon.

While Firebird Silver would release budget titles priced at £2.50, Firebird Gold would release more prestigious titles at a higher price. Firebird Gold established itself just as well as its budget counterpart. The label became synonymous with many classic 8-bit titles such as Elite, Revs, and The Sentinel.

In October 1985, the budget range was relaunched as the lower priced Firebird Silver 199 Range and a full price label, Firebird Hot, was created to publish titles such as Costa Capers, the sequel to Technician Ted. A further label called Firebird Super Silver was a short-lived mid-price range which published titles such as Chimera and the Amstrad CPC version of Booty at £3.99.

Firebird's success allowed them to acquire a number of third party developers, see Telecomsoft acquisitions below, and they also established a deal with Ultimate Play the Game, whereby they would convert and publish a number of their successful ZX Spectrum games to the Commodore 64.

As the Rainbird label became the home of Telecomsoft's premium products, the Gold and Hot labels slowly merged into a single full price range which went on to publish Mike Singleton's Dark Sceptre and the home conversions of Bubble Bobble.

A final overhaul of the Firebird brand was conducted in early 1988 as the budget titles became rebranded as Silverbird.

=== Silverbird ===

Rather than attempt to juggle a potentially confusing budget label with the same branding as their full price software, Telecomsoft decided to rebrand their Silver 199 budget label as a single Silverbird range. Two price points were established for 8-bit software (£1.99 and £2.99) while a few budget 16-bit titles were priced at £9.99. These various price points were differentiated between by their own particular style of packaging.

Rather than simply republish their existing range of budget software, Silverbird published a range of titles that hadn't previously been released at a budget price point. This included many original new titles as well older full-price titles acquired from other publishers.

Following MicroProse's acquisition of Telecomsoft, the US publisher sold off the Silverbird label to a Tudor Enterprises, a British publisher. They published a compilation pack of old Silverbird titles and a small number of original titles before closing down their software publishing operations.

=== Rainbird ===

The Rainbird label was established in November 1985 by Tony Rainbird. For legal reasons, the label's original name, Bluebird, had to be changed, although it still retained Tony Rainbird's original idea of releasing all its games in striking blue packaging.

The 16-bit home computer market, largely represented by the Atari ST and Amiga, was just beginning to take off in 1986 and the Rainbird label was an ideal opportunity to capitalise on it. Rather than concentrate on the more simplistic arcade action games that had dominated the 8-bit era, Rainbird aimed to introduce cutting edge simulators, adventure games and utilities to the full-price market.

Rainbird formed partnerships with a number of developers who would produce their next range of games. Magnetic Scrolls and Argonaut Software were amongst the first developers to benefit from a publishing deal with the label. Realtime Games, a successful ZX Spectrum developer who specialised in fast 3D action games, converted Starglider to the ZX Spectrum and developed Carrier Command.

The company republished enhanced versions of adventure games by Level 9 Computing, beginning with their Middle-earth trilogy: Colossal Adventure (itself an enhanced conversion of Adventure by Will Crowther and Don Woods), Adventure Quest and Dungeon Adventure, these last two featuring the Demon Lord Agaliarept. Rainbird published this sequence as Jewels of Darkness and references to Middle-earth were expunged. Rainbird also published Level 9's Silicon Dreams trilogy: Snowball was followed by Return to Eden and The Worm in Paradise.

MicroProse continued to use the Rainbird label for a number of years, after its acquisition of Telecomsoft.

=== Acquisitions ===
==== Beyond Software ====
One of Telecomsoft's earliest acquisitions was Beyond Software. Originally set up by the EMAP publishing group in 1983, Beyond published numerous titles on the ZX Spectrum, Commodore 64 and Amstrad CPC, but met with very little success until the release of Mike Singleton's Lords of Midnight in 1984. The Tolkien-esque strategy game, and allowed Beyond to establish a distribution deal with American developers First Star, as well as a publishing deal with developer Denton Designs.

After being acquired by Telecomsoft in late 1985 for a six figure sum, Beyond continued to operate as a unique label, mostly releasing games that had already been in development for some time, as well as a number of conversions of existing titles. Telecomsoft did very little with the Beyond label beyond these releases. A number of other titles, such as Star Trek: The Rebel Universe, were released on the Firebird label.

== See also ==
- SCi Games
