= List of Commodore 16 games =

There are 528 commercial video games released for the Commodore 16 computer on this list.

== Games ==
List of Commodore 16 games
Title	Genre	Release date	Language	Publisher	Ref
21-es (Blackjack)	Cards	1986	Hungarian	Ápisz	
3D Glooper	Maze	1985	English	Audiogenic	
3D Quasars	Shoot'em up	1986	English	Solar Software Ltd.	
3-D Sakk (3-D Chess)	Chess	Unknown	Hungarian	DELTASoft	
3D Time Trek	Simulator	1985	English	Anirog	
4+4 Sarok (4+4 Corners)	Logic	1986	Hungarian	Novotrade Magyarország	
A Hős Lovag (The Heroic Knight)	Adventure	1986	Hungarian	Novotrade Magyarország	
Aardvark	Wellpipe	1986	English	Bug-Byte	
Ace	Simulator	1985	English	Cascade Games Ltd.	
Ace +4	Simulator	1986	English	Cascade Games Ltd.	
Ace 2	Simulator	1987	English	Cascade Games Ltd.	
Airwolf	ArcadeAdventure	1985	English	Elite Systems Ltd.	
Airwolf 2	Shoot'em up	1987	English	Encore	
Alex	Action	1988	Hungarian	Novotrade Magyarország	
Alien	Adventure	Unknown	English	Gameworx Software	
Alien Attack	SpaceInvaders	1985	English	Solar Software Ltd.	
Aliens	ArcadeAdventure	1987	English	Electric Dreams	
Almatúra (Apple Tour)	Nibbler	1987	Hungarian	Novotrade Magyarország	
Amőba (Novotrade)	Amoeba	1986	Hungarian	Novotrade Magyarország	
Apollo Rescue	Action	1985	English	Tynesoft Computer Software (Tynesoft)	
Arena 3000	Shoot'em up	1985	English	Microdeal	
Arrow	Nibbler	Unknown	English	Commodore	
Arrow Of Death	Adventure	1984	English	Paxman Promotions	
Arthur Noid	Knockout	1988	English	Alternative Software Limited	
Asigo	Logic	1985	English	OPI (Omoga Productions International)	
Astro Plumber	Action	1985	English	Blue Ribbon	
Atlantis	Action	1985	English	Anirog	
Atomic Mission	Adventure	1984	English	Commodore	
Auf Wiedersehen Monty	Platformer	1987	English	Gremlin Graphics	
Auriga	Shoot'em up	1986	English	Players	
Auto Zone	Action	1987	English	Players	
Autobahn	Action	1985	English	Tynesoft Computer Software (Tynesoft)	
Bandits At Zero	Shoot'em up	1986-03	English	Mastertronic	
Bastow Manor	Adventure	Unknown	English	Gameworx Software	
Battle	Strategy	1987-04	English	Mastertronic	
Battle Star	Shoot'em up	1987	English	Tynesoft Computer Software (Tynesoft)	
Beach Head	Action	1985	English	US Gold	
Berks	Shoot'em up	1985	English	CRL Group PLC (CRL)	
Berks 3	ArcadeAdventure	1985	English	CRL Group PLC (CRL)	
Bernát A Nyomozó (Bernat The Detective)	ArcadeAdventure	1989	Hungarian	Novotrade Magyarország	
Betüpóker (Letter Poker)	MasterMind	1986	Hungarian	Novotrade Magyarország	
Betűrömi (Letter Rummy)	Cards	Unknown	Hungarian	Novotrade Magyarország	
Big Mac	Platformer	1985	English	Mastertronic	
Bigyulabolt (Gadget shop)	Management	1985	Hungarian	Novotrade Magyarország	
Bip-bip	Tron	1986	Hungarian	Novotrade Magyarország	
Bismark	Strategy	Unknown	Italian	Sound Acustical Design (SAD)	
Blagger	Platformer	1985	English	Alligata Software Limited	
Blaze	Shoot'em up	1985	English	Romik Software Ltd.	
Blockbusters	Trivia	1986	English	Macsen Software	
Blockbusters Extra Questions Database (expansion)	Trivia	1986	English	Macsen Software	
Blockbusters Goldrun	Trivia	1986	English	Macsen Software	
BMX Racers	Action	1985	English	Mastertronic	
BMX Simulator	Sport	1986	English	Codemasters	
Bölcsek Köve (Stone Of Sages)	Adventure	1988	Hungarian	Novotrade Magyarország	
Bomb Jack	Platformer	1986	English	Elite Systems Ltd.	
Bombázó Visszavág (Return of the Bomber)	Bomber	1986	Hungarian	Ápisz	
Bombjack II	Platformer	1986	English	Elite Systems Ltd.	
Bongo	Platformer	1986	English	Anco	
Booty	ArcadeAdventure	1986	English	Firebird	
Bowling (Data Media)	Sport	1986	German	Data Media GmbH	
Breki	Action	Unknown	Hungarian	Novotrade Magyarország	
Brian Clough's Football Fortunes	Board	1987	English	CDS Software LTD	
Bridgehead	Action	1986	English	Kingsoft; Anco	
Bridgehead C16	Action	1986	English	Kingsoft; Anco	
Bubble Trouble	Action	1986	English	Players	
Buckaroo Banzai +4	Adventure	1984	English	Adventure International	
Canoe Slalom	Sport	1985	English	Tynesoft Computer Software (Tynesoft)	
Castle Dracula (Adventure 5)	Adventure	1985	English	Microdeal	
Catacombs	Adventure	1984	English	Anirog	
Cave Fighter	Platformer	1985	English	Bubble Bus Software	
Championship Wrestling	Fighting	1987	English	US Gold; Octasoft	
Chicago	Dices	1987	German	Stone-Castle	
Chipy	Tetris	1989	English	Kingsoft	
Chopper War	Shoot'em up	1986	English	Illusion Software Ltd.	
Circus	Adventure	1984	English	Paxman Promotions	
Classic Adventure	Adventure	1985	English	Melbourne House	
Classic Bridge 4.0	Cards	1986	English	Anco	
Classic Snooker	Sport	1987	English	Anco	
Climb It	Action	1984	English	Tynesoft Computer Software (Tynesoft); QuelleSoft	
Commando	Commando	1986	English	Elite Systems Ltd.	
Control Command	Shoot'em up	1986	English	Paxman Promotions	
Cops 'n' Robbers	Action	1986-05	English	Atlantis Software Ltd.	
Corman	Platformer	1985	English	Commodore	
Crash 16	Action	1985	Finnish	Amersoft	
Crazy Golf	Sport	1984	English	Commodore	
Crillion	Action	1989	English	Kingsoft	
Cruncher	PacMan	1985	English	Solar Software Ltd.	
Csavargás A Gombák Birodalmában (Stroll in the Realm of Mushrooms)	Simulator	1988	Hungarian	Greensoft	
Csodálatos Simon (Wonderful Simon)	Platformer	1986	Hungarian	Novotrade Magyarország	
Cuthbert Enters The Tombs of Doom	ArcadeAdventure	1984	English	Microdeal	
Cuthbert In Space	Action	1985	English	Microdeal	
Cuthbert In The Cooler	Action	1985	English	Microdeal	
Cutthroats	Adventure	1984	English	Infocom, Inc.	
Cyberdroids	Shoot'em up	1987	English	Mr. Chip Software	
Cyborg	Shoot'em up	1985	English	Rino Marketing Limited	
Daley Thompson's Star Events	Sport	1985	English	Ocean Software Limited (Ocean)	
Dama Cinese (Chinese Checkers)	PegSolitaire	Unknown	Italian	Pubblirome	
Danger Zone	Shoot'em up	1986	English	Codemasters	
Dark Tower	Platformer	1985	English	Melbourne House	
Das Rätsel um die 7. Kolonie (Mystery of the Seventh Colony)	Adventure	1986	German	Kingsoft	
Death or Glory	Shoot'em up	1988	English	CRL Group PLC (CRL)	
Death Race 16	Race	1985-08	English	Atlantis Software Ltd.	
Death River	Shoot'em up	1986	English	Optyx Software Ltd.	
Defence-16	Shoot'em up	1985	English	Probe Software	
Delta 16	Shoot'em up	1985	Finnish	Amersoft	
Demolition	Knockout	1987	English	Anco	
Démonok Birodalma (Realm of Demons)	ArcadeAdventure	1989-07	Hungarian	Novotrade Magyarország	
Der Pfad Im Dschungel (The Path In The Jungle)	Adventure	1986	German	Kingsoft	
Diagon	Shoot'em up	1984	English	Bug-Byte	
Diamond Mine	Wellpipe	1986	English	Blue Ribbon	
Diamond Mine II	Wellpipe	1986	English	Blue Ribbon	
Die Seefahrt (Seafaring)	Management	1989	German	Kingsoft	
Digger	BoulderDash	1987	German	Stone-Castle	
Digital Ball	Knockout	1989	Hungarian	Novotrade Magyarország	
Dingbat	Action	1988-03	English	Mastertronic	
Dirty Den	Platformer	1986	English	Probe Software	
Dizasterblaster	Shoot'em up	1987	English	Americana Software	
Dizzy Dice	Gambling	1987	English	Players	
Dork's Dilemma	Action	1985-03	English	Gremlin Graphics	
Droid One	Shoot'em up	1986	English	Bug-Byte	
Dudaorrú Patric (Horn-nosed Patrick)	Action	1/22/1989	Hungarian	Novotrade Magyarország	
Éhes Kígyók (Hungry Snakes)	Action	1987	Hungarian	Vorker	
Elvarázsolt Kastély (Enchanted Castle)	Platformer	1987-05	Hungarian	Octasoft	
Emerald Mine	BoulderDash	1988	English	Kingsoft	
Emerald Mine II	BoulderDash	1988	English	Kingsoft	
Enigma	Action	1985	English	Commodore	
Escape From Psylon	ArcadeAdventure	1989	English/Hungarian	Novotrade Magyarország	
Escape From Pulsar 7	Adventure	1984	English	Paxman Promotions	
Észvesztő Útvesztő (Mindboggling Maze)	Maze	1987	Hungarian	Novotrade Magyarország	
European Games	Sport	1987	English	Tynesoft Computer Software (Tynesoft)	
Exorcist	Action	1984	English	Commodore	
Fantastic Four	Adventure	1985	English	Adventure International (UK)	
Feasibility Experiment	Adventure	1984	English	Paxman Promotions	
Feindfahrt U 107 (Mission U107, aka U-Boat)	Adventure	6/10/1987	German	Softwarehaus R. Lindenschmidt	
Fektesd Le	Board	Unknown	Hungarian	Mikronika	
Fighting Warrior	Fighting	1986	English	Melbourne House	
Finders Keepers	ArcadeAdventure	1986-09	English	Mastertronic	
Fingers Malone	Action	1986-05	English	Mastertronic	
Fire Ant	Action	1984	English	Commodore	
Fire-Galaxy	Shoot'em up	1987	English	Kingsoft	
Flight Path 737	Simulator	1984	English	Anirog	
Flight Zero-One-Five	Simulator	1984	English	Craig Communications	
Flipper	Pinball	Unknown	Hungarian	Mikronika	
Flopp	Action	1987	Hungarian	Octasoft	
Football Manager	Management	1986	English	Addictive Games	
Footballer Of The Year	Board	1986	English	Gremlin Graphics	
Formula 1 Simulator	Race	1985-07	English	Mastertronic	
Fortress Underground	Action	1987	English	Kingsoft	
Frank Bruno's Boxing	Fighting	1986	English	Elite Systems Ltd.	
Frenesis	Action	1987	English	Mastertronic	
Fury	Action	1986	English	Firebird	
Future Knight	ArcadeAdventure	1986	English	Gremlin Graphics	
Future Shock	ArcadeAdventure	1987	English	Tynesoft Computer Software (Tynesoft)	
Galaxions	SpaceInvaders	1984	English	Solar Software Ltd.	
Galaxy	Shoot'em up	1985	English	Anirog	
Gärtner (Garderner)	Action	1987	German	Stone-Castle	
Ghost Town	ArcadeAdventure	1985	English/German	Anirog	
Ghost Town (USA)	Adventure	3/13/1985	English	Pacific Tri Micro, Inc. (Tri Micro)	
Ghosts 'n Goblins	Action	1986	English	Elite Systems Ltd.	
G-Man	Action	1986	English	Codemasters	
Gnasher	PacMan	12/3/1986	English	Yes! Software	
Godzilla	Action	1988	Hungarian	Novotrade Magyarország	
Golden Baton	Adventure	1984	English	Paxman Promotions	
Goldrush	Shoot'em up	1986	English	Firebird	
Golf (Data Media)	Sport	1986	German	Data Media GmbH	
Golf 16K	Sport	1986	English	Yes! Software	
Grand Master	Chess	1985	English	Kingsoft; Audiogenic	
Gremlins: The Adventure	Adventure	1984	English	Adventure International (UK)	
Gridtrap	Action	1985	English	Livewire Software	
Gullwing Falcon	Shoot'em up	1985-08	English	Gremlin Graphics; Top30	
Gunlaw	Commando	1987	English	Mastertronic	
Gunslinger	Action	1985	English	Tynesoft Computer Software (Tynesoft); QuelleSoft	
Gusztáv Motorozik (Gustav Rides the Bike)	Action	Unknown	Hungarian	Vages Software	
Guzzler	Action	1986	English	Players	
Gwnn	Shoot'em up	1987-05	English	Mastertronic	
Hangmemória (Sound Memory)	Action	Unknown	Hungarian	Ápisz	
Harbour Attack	Action	1984	English	Commodore	
Hard Maze 3D (Dedalus 3D)	Maze	1985	English	Playvision	
Harvey Headbanger	Action	1986	English	Firebird	
Heebie Jeebies	Action	1986	English	Livewire Software	
Hektik	Action	1986	English	Mastertronic	
Hercules	Platformer	1987	English	The Power House	
Hide And Seek	Educational	1985	English	Commodore	
Hidra	Life	1986	Hungarian	Novotrade Magyarország	
Higher Or Lower (Street Games)	Cards	Unknown	English	Pacific Tri Micro, Inc. (Tri Micro)	
Hit & Miss	Mastermind	1985	English	Venturegate Ltd.	
The Hitchhiker's Guide to the Galaxy	Adventure	1984	English	Infocom, Inc.	
Hofstedes Boeing-Simulator	Simulator	7/25/1988	German	Computerservice Tino Hofstede	
Hofstedes Hubschrauber-Simulator (Hofstede's Helicopter-Simulator)	Simulator	11/18/1988	German	Computerservice Tino Hofstede	
Hollywood Poker	Cards	1987-01	English	Players	
Hoppit	Frogger	1984	English	Tynesoft Computer Software (Tynesoft); QuelleSoft	
Hungaroring	Race	1986	English	Novotrade Magyarország	
Hustler	Sport	1985	English	Bubble Bus Software	
Hyperforce	Action	1986	English	Ariolasoft	
Ian Botham's Test Match	Sport	1986	English	Tynesoft Computer Software (Tynesoft)	
Icicle Works	BoulderDash	1985	English	Commodore	
Időlabirintus (Time Labyrinth)	Maze	1987	Hungarian	Novotrade Magyarország	
IFR (Flight Simulator)	Simulator	1985	English	Academy Software	
Ikari Warriors	Commando	1987	English	Elite Systems Ltd.	
Indoor Soccer	Sport	1986	English	Magnificent 7 Software	
Indoor Sports	Sport	1988	English	Tynesoft Computer Software (Tynesoft)	
International Karate	Fighting	1986	English	Endurance Games	
Into The Deep	Action	1986	English	Firebird	
Invaders (Arcadia)	SpaceInvaders	Unknown	English	Arcadia Software	
Invaders (Livewire)	SpaceInvaders	1987	English	Livewire Software	
Invasion 2000 AD	SpaceInvaders	1985	English	Solar Software Ltd.	
Invázió (Invasion)	Bomber	1986	Hungarian	Ápisz	
Invincible	Platformer	1988-06	Hungarian	Novotrade Magyarország	
Jack Attack	Action	1984	English	Commodore; Grupo Sigma S.A. (Sigma); Drean	
Jail Break	Knockout	1985	English	Argus Press Software (APS)	
Jerusalem (Adventure 2)	Adventure	1985	English	Microdeal	
Jet Set Willy	Platformer	1986	English	Tynesoft Computer Software (Tynesoft)	
Jet Set Willy II	Platformer	1986	English	Tynesoft Computer Software (Tynesoft)	
Jetbrix	Action	1986	English	Gremlin Graphics	
Joe and the Seriff (Joe and the Sheriff)	Action	Unknown	Hungarian	Puhasoft	
Joe Blade 2	ArcadeAdventure	1988	English	Players	
Joey	Platformer	1986	English	Blue Ribbon	
Jumbo	Action	1988	Hungarian	Novotrade Magyarország	
Jump Jet	Simulator	1985	English	Anirog	
Kaktus	Shoot'em up	1985	English	Audiogenic	
Kane	Action	1986	English	Mastertronic	
Karate	Fighting	1987	Hungarian	Novotrade Magyarország	
Karate King	Fighting	1986	English	Kingsoft	
Karting Grand Prix	Sport	1989	English	Kingsoft	
Keresd A Gyémántot (Search for the Diamonds)	BoulderDash	1988	Hungarian	Novotrade Magyarország	
Ki Jut Az Erdőbe? (Who Will Reach the Forest?)	Educational	Unknown	Hungarian	Novotrade Magyarország	
Kikstart: Off-Road Simulator	Action	1986	English	Mastertronic	
Killapede	Centipede	1986	English	Players	
Kincsvadász (Treasure Hunter)	Adventure	1986	Hungarian	Novotrade Magyarország	
King Solomon's Mines	Adventure	1986	English	Gameworx Software	
Knock Out	Knockout	1985	English	Solar Software Ltd.	
Kockapóker (Dice Poker)	Dices	1987	Hungarian	Octasoft	
Kőműves Kelemen (Kelemen The Brickbuilder)	Tetris	1987	Hungarian	Novotrade Magyarország	
Kresz +4	Educational	1986	Hungarian	Novotrade Magyarország	
Kroesus	Management	1989	German	Softwarehaus R. Lindenschmidt	
Kung-Fu Kid	Action	1986	English	Gremlin Graphics	
Labyrinth	Maze	1985	Italian	Commodore	
Las Vegas	Gambling	1984	English	Anirog	
Lawn Tennis	Sport	1985	English	Tynesoft Computer Software (Tynesoft)	
Lazer 900	Centipede	1986	English	Yes! Software	
League Challenge	Management	1988	English	Atlantis Software Ltd.	
Leaper	Action	1986	English	Bug-Byte	
Leaper (Star Soft)	Action	1985-11	English	Argus Press Software (APS)	
Leapin Louie	Platformer	1985	English	Audiogenic	
Legende Im Eis (Legend Inside the Ice)	Adventure	1986	German	Kingsoft	
Légicsata (Air Battle)	Simulator	1986	Hungarian	Novotrade Magyarország	
Legionnaire	Commando	1986	English	Anco	
Lemonade Stand	Management	Unknown	English	Pacific Tri Micro, Inc. (Tri Micro)	
Lemuria	Adventure	1984	German	UserSoft	
Lézer-Harc (Laser Fight)	Shoot'em up	1986	Hungarian	Ápisz	
Liberator	Shoot'em up	1987	English	Alternative Software Limited	
Loco-coco	Action	1986	English	Illusion Software Ltd.	
Locomotion	Action	1985	English	Commodore	
Logi-Toli (Logic Pusher)	SlidePuzzle	1986	Hungarian	Novotrade Magyarország	
Lunar Docking	Action	1985	English	Tynesoft Computer Software (Tynesoft)	
Mad Mummy	Adventure	1984	English	Gameworx Software	
Mail Trail	Action	1985	English	Razorsoft	
Major Blink	Action	1985	English	CRL Group PLC (CRL)	
Maniax	Action	1988	English	Kingsoft	
Manic Death Chase	Platformer	1985	English	Knightsoft	
Manic Miner	Platformer	1986	English	Software Projects Ltd	
Mansion (Adventure 1)	Adventure	1985	English	Microdeal	
Marsall (Marshall)	Strategy	1986	Hungarian	Novotrade Magyarország	
Master Chess	Chess	1987	English	Mastertronic	
Master Color	MasterMind	1985	Italian	CSP Microgame (CSP)	
Mayhem	Action	1984	English	Commodore	
Mazeman	Maze	Unknown	Italian	Savage Software	
Mega Zap	Shoot'em up	1985	English	Razorsoft; Paxman Promotions	
Megabolts	ArcadeAdventure	1986	English	Mastertronic	
Memória	Memory	1988	Hungarian	Octasoft	
Memoria (Sigma)	Memory	1984-11	Spanish	Programma 2000 (P 2000)	
Menekülés (The Escape)	Action	1986	Hungarian	Novotrade Magyarország	
Mercenary: Escape from Targ	Simulator	1986	English	Novagen Software Ltd	
Mercenary: The Second City (expansion)	Simulator	1986	English	Novagen Software Ltd	
Mesél Az Erdő (Tales of the Forest)	Platformer	1988	Hungarian	Novotrade Magyarország	
Meteorite	Shoot'em up	1986	English	Solar Software Ltd.	
Minefield Maze	Action	1985	English	Street Games	
Mini Rulett	Gambling	1992	Hungarian	Puhasoft	
Minipedes	Centipede	1984	English	Anirog	
Mission Mars	Action	1985	English	Solar Software Ltd.	
Molecule Man	ArcadeAdventure	1987	English	Mastertronic	
Monkey Magic	Shoot'em up	1985	English	Solar Software Ltd.	
Monty on the Run	Platformer	1986	English	Gremlin Graphics	
Moon Buggy	Action	1985	English	Anirog	
Mount Vesuvius	Action	1985	English	Tynesoft Computer Software (Tynesoft)	
Mr. Puniverse	Platformer	1985	English	Mastertronic	
Munch It	PacMan	1984	English	Tynesoft Computer Software (Tynesoft); QuelleSoft	
Murder On The Waterfront	Adventure	Unknown	English	Gameworx Software	
Mushroom Mania	Centipede	Unknown	English	Arcadia Software	
Myriad	Shoot'em up	1986-01	English	Atlantis Software Ltd.	
Netrun 2000	Action	1986	English	Firebird	
Newton Almája (Newton's Apple)	Logic	1987	Hungarian	Novotrade Magyarország	
NIM Logikai Játék	Logic	1986	Hungarian	Ápisz	
Ninja	Adventure	Unknown	English	Dotsoft	
Ninja Master	Sport	1986	English	Firebird	
Number Builder	Educational	1985	English	Commodore	
Number Chaser	Educational	1985	English	Commodore	
Oblido	Sokoban	1986-06	English	Mastertronic	
Oliver Otthona (Oliver's Home)	ArcadeAdventure	1988-04	Hungarian	Novotrade Magyarország	
Olympiad	Sport	1984	English	Tynesoft Computer Software (Tynesoft)	
Olympic Skier	Sport	1985	English	Mr. Chip Software	
On Cue	Sport	1987	English	Mastertronic	
One Man and His Droid	Action	1986	English	Mastertronic	
Operation Hawaii	Adventure	1986	German	Golden Games	
Operation Red Moon	Shoot'em up	1986	English	Yes! Software	
Operation Thunderstorm	Adventure	Unknown	German	Softwarehaus R. Lindenschmidt	
Oszkár A Lovag (Oscar The Knight)	Action	1987	English	Novotrade Magyarország	
Out on a Limb	Platformer	1984	English	Anirog	
Pacmania	PacMan	1985	English	Mr. Chip Software	
Pancho	Q-bert	1985	English	Commodore	
Panik!	Action	1986	English	Atlantis Software Ltd.	
Paperboy	Action	1986	English	Elite Systems Ltd.	
Parketta (Parquet Floor)	Logic	1987	Hungarian	Novotrade Magyarország	
Pasta Blasta	Shoot'em up	1984	English	Arcadia Software	
Pattinka (Bouncy)	Logic	Unknown	Hungarian	Novotrade Magyarország	
Perseus & Andromeda	Adventure	1984	English	Paxman Promotions	
Petals Of Doom	Action	1985-01	English	Gremlin Graphics	
Petch	Action	1985	English	Anirog; Tequila Sunrise	
Phantom	Action	1987	English	Tynesoft Computer Software (Tynesoft)	
Pharaoh's Tomb	ArcadeAdventure	1986	English	Magnificent 7 Software	
Pheenix	Shoot'em up	1986	English	Alternative Software Limited	
Pin Point	Action	1986	English	Anco	
Pirate Adventure	Adventure	1984	English	Commodore	
Pizza Pete	Platformer	1985	English	Illusion Software Ltd.	
Planetfall	Adventure	1984	English	Infocom, Inc.	
Platina	Action	1989-02	Hungarian	Novotrade Magyarország	
Plus Casino	Gambling	Unknown	English	Pacific Tri Micro, Inc. (Tri Micro)	
Pogo Pete	Action	1985	English	Tynesoft Computer Software (Tynesoft); QuelleSoft	
Poker (Street Games)	Cards	1985	English	Street Games	
Pontoon (Venturegate)	Cards	1985	English	Venturegate Ltd.	
Pottit	Action	1984	English	Romik Software Ltd.	
Potty	Bomber	Unknown	Hungarian	Mikronika	
Power Ball	Action	1986	English	Mastertronic	
Project Nova	Simulator	1986	English	Gremlin Graphics	
Proof of Destruction	Shoot'em up	1986-10	English	Mastertronic	
Prospector Pete	Action	1986	English	Mastertronic	
Punchy	Action	1984	English	Commodore	
Puppy's	Platformer	1986	English	Visiogame	
Purple Turtles	Action	1984	English	Commodore	
Quattrow	Logic	1984	English	Street Games	
Quick Draw	Shoot'em up	1985	English	Solar Software Ltd.	
Quiwi	Trivia	1986	German	Kingsoft	
Quizmix	Trivia	1989	German	Softwarehaus R. Lindenschmidt	
Rabló-Rulett (Bandit Roulette)	Gambling	1987	Hungarian	Novotrade Magyarország	
Raffles	Action	1985	English	Tynesoft Computer Software (Tynesoft)	
Raider	Shoot'em up	1985	English	Razorsoft	
Rambo	Commando	1986	English	Visiogame	
Rázós Út (The Shaky Road)	Action	1988	Hungarian	Novotrade Magyarország	
Reach For The Sky	Shoot'em up	1986	English	Gremlin Graphics	
Reflex	Knockout	1988	English	Players	
Rescue From Zylon	Action	1985	English	Gremlin Graphics	
Return of Rockman	BoulderDash	1986	English	Mastertronic	
Rig Attack	Action	1984	English	Tynesoft Computer Software (Tynesoft)	
Robin To The Rescue	Action	1985	English	Solar Software Ltd.	
Robo Knight	ArcadeAdventure	1986	English	Americana Software	
Robotháború (Robot War)	Tron	1989	Hungarian	Novotrade Magyarország	
Rockman	BoulderDash	1985	English	Mastertronic	
Roll	Logic	1986	Hungarian	Novotrade Magyarország	
Roller Kong	Action	1985	English	Graphic Game S.A.; Melbourne House	
Room Ten	Action	1987	English	CRL Group PLC (CRL)	
Rug Rider	Action	1985	English	Pacific Tri Micro, Inc. (Tri Micro)	
Runner	Platformer	1986	English	Firebird	
Saboteur!	ArcadeAdventure	1986	English	Durell Software	
Saboteur! C16	ArcadeAdventure	1986	English	Durell Software	
Safari	Logic	1987	German	Stone-Castle	
Salvage	Adventure	1985	English	Livewire Software	
Savage Island Part One	Adventure	1986	English	Tynesoft Computer Software (Tynesoft)	
Savage Island Part Two	Adventure	1986	English	Tynesoft Computer Software (Tynesoft)	
Scooby-Doo	Action	1986	English	Elite Systems Ltd.	
Sea Strike	Shoot'em up	1985	English	Razorsoft	
Sejtautomaták (Cellular Automata)	Life	5/10/1986	Hungarian	Novotrade Magyarország	
Sensei	Management	1987	German	MB-Soft	
Serpent 16	Nibbler	1985	Italian	CSP Microgame	
Shark Attack	Shoot'em up	1986	English	Firebird	
Shoot It	SpaceInvaders	1984	English	Tynesoft Computer Software; QuelleSoft	
Sielő (Skier)	Sport	1986	Hungarian	Ápisz	
Sir Knight	Action	Unknown	English	Tynesoft Computer Software	
Skelby	Action	1986	English	Yes! Software	
Skramble	Shoot'em up	1984	English	Anirog	
Skull Island	Adventure	1984	English	Dotsoft	
Skyhawk	Shoot'em up	1986	English	Bug-Byte	
Slippery Sid	Nibbler	1984	English	Citisoft Ltd.	
Small Jones	Action	1985	English	Visiogame	
Snooker & Pool	Sport	1987	English	Gremlin Graphics	
Soliter (Solitaire)	Board	1986	Hungarian	Ápisz	
Solo	Shoot'em up	1985	English	Bug-Byte	
Space Escort	Shoot'em up	1985-10	English	Atlantis Software Ltd.	
Space Fiends	Shoot'em up	1985	English	Alternative Software Limited	
Space Freeks	Shoot'em up	1985	English	Solar Software Ltd.	
Space Pilot	Shoot'em up	1986	English	Anco	
Spectipede	Centipede	1985	English	Mastertronic	
Speed King	Race	1986-07	English	Mastertronic	
Spiderman	Adventure	1984	English	Adventure International (UK)	
Spiky Harold	Platformer	1986	English	Firebird	
Split Personalities	Logic	1987	English	Domark Ltd.	
Splitz	Platformer	1987	English	The Power House	
Spore	Action	1987-11	English	Mastertronic	
Spy vs. Spy	ArcadeAdventure	1987	English	Tynesoft Computer Software	
Sqij	ArcadeAdventure	1987	English	The Power House	
Squirm	Action	1985	English	Mastertronic	
Star Commander	Shoot'em up	1985	English	Anirog	
Starburst	Action	1986	English	Ariolasoft	
Starcross	Adventure	1984	English	Infocom, Inc.	
Starforce Nova	Shoot'em up	1987	English	Mastertronic	
Starlite 1	ArcadeAdventure	1986	English	Yes! Software	
Starter Chess	Chess	1984	English	Commodore	
Steinzeit (Stone Age)	Action	1987	German	Stone-Castle	
Steve Davis Snooker	Sport	1985	English	CDS Software LTD	
Storm	ArcadeAdventure	1986	English	Mastertronic	
Strange Odyssey	Adventure	1984	English	Commodore	
Strangers	SpaceInvaders	1986	English	Vages Software	
Street Olympics	Sport	1986-05	English	Mastertronic	
Strip Poker	Cards	1986	English/German	Anco	
Strip Poker II Plus	Cards	1988	English	Anco	
Stud Poker	Cards	1985	German	Data Media GmbH	
Suicide Run	Shoot'em up	1985	English	Solar Software Ltd.	
Summer Events	Sport	1987	English	Anco	
Sun Star	Action	1987	English	CRL Group PLC	
Super Cobra	Shoot'em up	1987	Hungarian	Novotrade Magyarország	
Super Gran	Action	1985	English	Tynesoft Computer Software	
Super Gran: The Adventure	Adventure	5/15/1985	English	Tynesoft Computer Software	
Super Spell	Educational	1984	English	Commodore	
Superman: The Game	Action	1987	English	Prism Leisure Corporation	
Survivors	BoulderDash	1987	English	Atlantis Software Ltd.	
Suspect	Adventure	1984	English	Infocom, Inc.	
Suspended	Adventure	1984	English	Infocom, Inc.	
Sword Of Destiny	ArcadeAdventure	1985-04	English	Gremlin Graphics	
Szemirámisz	Action	1987	Hungarian	Octasoft	
Szerpentin	Tron	1986	Hungarian	Novotrade Magyarország	
Tablets Of Hippocrates	Adventure	1985	English	Fawkes Computing	
Tank Attack	Shoot'em up	1986	English	Solar Software Ltd.	
Tányértorony (Tower of Plates)	Logic	1985	Hungarian	Novotrade Magyarország	
Taskforce	Action	1989	English	Players	
Tazz	Shoot'em up	1986	English	Bubble Bus Software	
Ten Little Indians	Adventure	1984	English	Paxman Promotions	
Térbeli Amőba (3D Amoeba)	TicTacToe	1985	Hungarian	Novotrade Magyarország	
Terra Cognita	Shoot'em up	1986	English	Codemasters	
Terra Nova	Shoot'em up	1987	English	Anco	
Thai Boxing	Fighting	1985	English	Anco	
The Boss	Management	1985	English	Alternative Software Limited	
The Chip Factory	Platformer	1985	English	Audiogenic	
The Hulk	Adventure	1984	English	Commodore	
The Hulk C16	Adventure	1984	English	Adventure International (UK)	
The Magician's Curse	ArcadeAdventure	1986	English	Gremlin Graphics	
The Mutant Spiders	Adventure	Unknown	English	Handic Software	
The Real Stunt Experts	Action	1989	English	Winner	
The Sorcerer Of Claymorgue Castle	Adventure	1984	English	Adventure International (UK)	
The Sorcerer Of Claymorgue Castle +4	Adventure	1985	English	Adventure International	
The Time Machine	Adventure	1984	English	Paxman Promotions	
The Way of the Exploding Fist	Fighting	1986	English	Melbourne House	
The Way of the Tiger	Fighting	1986	English	Gremlin Graphics	
The Wizard And The Princess	Action	1985	English	Melbourne House	
Thermo Nuclear War Games	Adventure	1984	English	Gameworx Software	
Thrust	Action	1987	English	Firebird	
Timeslip	Shoot'em up	1985	English	English Software	
Tom Thumb	Platformer	1985	English	Anirog	
Tomb Of Tarrabash	ArcadeAdventure	1985	English	Audiogenic	
Tomcat	Shoot'em up	1989	English	Players	
Torpedó (Unisoft)	Battleships	1986	Hungarian	Unisoft	
Torpedo Alley	Simulator	1986	English	Firebird	
Torpedo Run	Simulator	1985	English	Citisoft Ltd.	
Tower Of Evil	ArcadeAdventure	1985	English	Creative Sparks	
Trailblazer	Race	1986	English	Gremlin Graphics	
Treasure Hunter	Adventure	1986	English	Solar Software Ltd.	
Treasure Island	ArcadeAdventure	1985	English	Commodore	
Trivia	Trivia	1986-02	Italian	Editronica Srl (Editronica)	
Trivia UK	Trivia	1985	English	Anirog	
Trizons	Shoot'em up	1986	English	Bubble Bus Software	
Tube Runner	Action	1988	English	Gremlin Graphics	
Tutti Frutti	Action	1985	English	Mastertronic	
TV-Játék (TV Game)	Pong	1986	Hungarian	Novotrade Magyarország	
Twin Kingdom Valley	Adventure	1985	English	Bug-Byte	
Two To One	Action	1990	English	Kingsoft	
Tycoon Tex	Action	1985-01	English	Gremlin Graphics	
U-Boot	Battleships	1985	Italian	CSP Microgame (CSP)	
Ufo Vadász (UFO Hunter)	Action	1988	Hungarian	Novotrade Magyarország	
Ultimate (Adventure 4)	Adventure	1985	English	Microdeal	
Űrkaland (Space Adventure)	ArcadeAdventure	1989	Hungarian	Novotrade Magyarország	
Űrpók (Space Spider)	Shoot'em up	1987	Hungarian	Novotrade Magyarország	
Ürtojások (Space Eggs)	Shoot'em up	1986	Hungarian	NewLine Hardware/Software (NewLine)	
Űrvirág (Space Flower)	Action	Unknown	Hungarian	Mikronika	
UXB	Action	1984	English	Commodore	
Vadász És Nyúl (Hunter And Rabbit)	Logic	1986	Hungarian	Novotrade Magyarország	
Varmit	Action	1986	English	Players	
Vegas Jackpot	Gambling	1985	English	Mastertronic	
Verem (Stack)	Tetris	1987	Hungarian	Octasoft	
Video Classics	Pong	1988	English	Silverbird	
Video Meanies	ArcadeAdventure	1986	English	Mastertronic	
Video Poker	Gambling	1986-09	English	Mastertronic	
Viduzzles	Jigsaw	1984	English	Commodore; Drean	
Viktor A Piktor (Victor The Painter)	Amidar	1987	Hungarian	DELTASoft	
Vipera (Viper)	Nibbler	1986	Hungarian	Ápisz	
Vox	Shoot'em up	1985	English	Tynesoft Computer Software (Tynesoft)	
Walaki	ArcadeAdventure	1987	Hungarian	Novotrade Magyarország	
War Games	Strategy	1986	Italian	Visiogame	
Water Grand Prix	Race	1985	English	Tynesoft Computer Software (Tynesoft)	
Waxworks	Adventure	1984	English	Paxman Promotions	
White Max	Action	8/9/1985	English	Inter GM	
Who Dares Wins II	Commando	1986	English	Tynesoft Computer Software (Tynesoft)	
Williamsburg (Adventure 3)	Adventure	1985	English	Microdeal	
Wimbledon	Sport	1986	English	Gremlin Graphics	
Winnie Witch's Superbroom	Shoot'em up	1986	English	Solar Software Ltd.	
Winter Events	Sport	1986-09	English	Anco	
Winter Olympics	Sport	1986	English	Tynesoft Computer Software (Tynesoft); QuelleSoft	
Witness	Adventure	1984	English	Infocom, Inc.	
Wolf Pack	Action	1985	English	Illusion Software Ltd.	
Word Search (Commodore)	Educational	Unknown	English	Commodore	
Word Search (Older)	Educational	Unknown	English	CUE Inc.	
World Cup	Sport	1985	English	Artic Computing Ltd.	
World Cup Carnival	Sport	1986	English	US Gold	
World Series Baseball	Sport	1985	English	Imagine Software	
World Series Baseball Plus/4	Sport	1985	English	Imagine Software	
Wu Lung	Board	1987	German/English	ComputerSoft Jonigk (CSJ)	
Xadium	Action	1987	English	Mastertronic	
Xargon Wars	Shoot'em up	1984-12	English	Gremlin Graphics	
Xargon's Revenge	Shoot'em up	1985-09	English	Gremlin Graphics	
XCellor8	Action	1986	English	Gremlin Graphics	
Yie Ar Kung-Fu	Fighting	1986	English	Imagine Software	
Zagan Warrior	Simulator	1986	English	Bug-Byte	
Zap-em	Shoot'em up	1985	English	Tynesoft Computer Software (Tynesoft)	
Zodiac	ArcadeAdventure	1985	English	Anirog	
Zolyx	Action	1987	English	Firebird	
Zone Control	Shoot'em up	1986	English	Paxman Promotions	
Zork I	Adventure	1984	English	Infocom, Inc.	
Zork II	Adventure	1984	English	Infocom, Inc.	
Zork III	Adventure	1984	English	Infocom, Inc.	
Zortek and the Microchips	Educational	1985	English	Commodore	
Zsoldos Repülő (Mercenary Plane)	Action	Unknown	(none)	Puhasoft	

== Compilations ==
There are 295 games released on 73 commercial compilations, excluding clones and hacks.

List of Commodore 16 games on compilations
Title	Genre	Release date	Language	Compilation	Publisher
1000 Miles	Board	Unknown	English	Experiences In Software	Commodore
2D Maze	Maze	1984	English	Commodore 16 Games Pack I	Melbourne House
3D Ghost Chase	Maze	Unknown	English	Four Great Games	MicroValue
Ack Ack Attack	Action	1988	English	Four Great Games Vol. 3	MicroValue
Add and Subtract	Educational	1984	English	Math Games And Word Problems	Commodore
Air Traffic	Simulator	1986	Dutch	Cassette C1606	Courbois Software
Alien Invasion	Action	1988	English	Sextett	Kingsoft
Alien Overrun	Action	1984	English	Commodore 16 Games Pack II	Melbourne House
Android Nim	Logic	1984	English	Maze Mania	Commodore
Astrapede	Centipede	Unknown	English	Astralog Four Pack	Astralog
Avelanche	Logic	1985	Dutch	Cassette C1605	Courbois Software
Avventura Nei Feudi (Adventure Into Fiefs)	Management	1985	Italian	Avventura Nei Feudi / Salvala	Mantra Software
Backgammon	Backgammon	1986	English/German	King Size Volume 1 & Volume 2	Robtek
Backgammon (J.Soft)	Backgammon	1985	Italian	Il Libro Dei Giochi Per Commodore 16 E Plus/4	J.Soft
Balance	Action	1986	German	Surround / Balance / Tricky Dices	Data Media GmbH
Barricade (King Size)	Action	1986	English	King Size Volume 1 & Volume 2	Robtek
Bets	Cards	1985	Dutch	Cassette C1604	Courbois Software
Beursspel (Stock Market Game)	Management	1986	Dutch	Cassette C1606	Courbois Software
Blackjack	Cards	1984	English	Commodore 16 Games Pack I	Melbourne House
Blackjack (Mindbenders)	Cards	1984	English	Mindbenders	Commodore
Blast It	Shoot'em up	1985	English	Syndrome Compilation	Jaysoft
Blitz (Courbois)	Bomber	1984	Dutch	Cassette C1601	Courbois Software
Blitz 16	Bomber	1984	English	C16 Super Games 1	Commodore
Blockade	Tron	1984	English	Commodore 16 Games Pack I	Melbourne House
Bop (Dutch)	Educational	1985	Dutch	Cassette C1601	Courbois Software
Bounder	Action	1986	English	Bounder And Planet Search	Gremlin Graphics
Bowling	Sport	Unknown	English	King Size Volume 1 & Volume 2	Robtek
Bowling (Italian)	Sport	Unknown	Italian	Il Libro Dei Giochi Per Commodore 16 E Plus/4	J.Soft
Breakin	Knockout	1984	English	Commodore 16 Games Pack I	Melbourne House
Bridge	Action	1986	German	C16/C116 Programmsammlung	Markt & Technik (M&T)
Briscola	Cards	1985	Italian	I Giochi Di Società	Editoriale Video
Buckaroo Banzai	Adventure	Unknown	English	Scott Adams Scoops	Master Games
Buggy	Action	Unknown	English	King Size Volume 1 & Volume 2	Robtek
Bus-Stop	Strategy	1988	German	Plus-Paket (AMA)	Andysoft
Cannon	Shoot'em up	1986	English	C16/C116 Programmsammlung	Markt & Technik (M&T)
Canoe Slalom (Anco)	Sport	1986	English	Sports 4	Anco
Capture	Action	1986	Dutch	Cassette C1609	Courbois Software
Car Chase	Action	1986	English	King Size Volume 1 & Volume 2	Robtek
Car Race Multiplication	Educational	1984	English	Math Games And Word Problems	Commodore
Careful	Action	1984	English	Maze Mania	Commodore
Cash Register	Educational	1984	English	Math Games And Word Problems	Commodore
Castle (King Size)	Action	1986	English	King Size Volume 1 & Volume 2	Robtek
Cave Hunt	Action	Unknown	English	Astralog Four Pack	Astralog
Centen Sommen (Sum of Pennies)	Educational	1984	Dutch	Cassette C16S02	Courbois Software
Chase	Action	1984	English	Maze Mania	Commodore
Checkers (Amvic)	Draughts	1986	English	20 Games	Amvic Services (AVS)
Chess	Chess	1984	English	Commodore 16 Games Pack II	Melbourne House
Chinese Checkers	Board	Unknown	Italian	2Games: Reversi Chinese Checkers	Visiogame
Clues	Trivia	1986	English	20 Games	Amvic Services (AVS)
Coconut Swamp	Logic	1986	English	King Size Volume 1 & Volume 2	Robtek
Colossal Cave	Adventure	1985	English	The Commodore Plus/4 Adventure Pack	Duckworth Computing
Concentration	Memory	1986	English	Can Of Worms	Livewire Software
Connect	Logic	1986	English	20 Games	Amvic Services (AVS)
Crash Barrier	Action	1984	English	Commodore 16 Games Pack II	Melbourne House
Dam Breker	Action	1986	Dutch	Cassette C1610	Courbois Software
Danger Diamonds	BoulderDash	1986	English	CSJ Games 1	ComputerSoft Jonigk (CSJ)
De Car Race (The Car Race)	Educational	1986	Dutch	Cassette C16S02	Courbois Software
Death Ship	Adventure	Unknown	English	King Size Volume 1 & Volume 2	Robtek
Deggendorf	Strategy	1988	German	Plus-Paket (AMA)	Andysoft
Demolition (Basic)	Action	Unknown	English	King Size Volume 1 & Volume 2	Robtek
Depth Charge	Battleships	1986	English	20 Games	Amvic Services (AVS)
Destructor	Shoot'em up	1985	English	King Size Volume 1 & Volume 2	Robtek
Deviazioni (Deflections)	Action	1985	Italian	Il Libro Dei Giochi Per Commodore 16 E Plus/4	J.Soft
Diabolo	Shoot'em up	1985	English	C16/C116 Programmsammlung	Markt & Technik (M&T)
Dodge City	Logic	1986	Dutch	Cassette C1607	Courbois Software
Don Paint	Logic	1984	German	Don Paint / Surround	UserSoft; Data Media GmbH
Doolhof 2 (Maze)	Maze	1986	Dutch	Doolhof (Maze)	Courbois, Hans
Doors	Adventure	1988	English	Plus/4 Program Pack	The Plus/4 Users' Group (PLUG)
Double	Logic	Unknown	English	King Size Volume 1 & Volume 2	Robtek
Dragon Maze	Maze	1984	English	Maze Mania	Commodore
Dragon's Lair	Adventure	1984	English	Commodore 16 Games Pack I	Melbourne House
Draughts	Draughts	Unknown	English	King Size Volume 1 & Volume 2	Robtek
Draw Poker	Cards	1986	English	20 Games	Amvic Services (AVS)
Driver	Action	Unknown	English	King Size Volume 1 & Volume 2	Robtek
Dumper	Action	1984	English	Commodore 16 Games Pack II	Melbourne House
Dungeon	Roguelike	1984	English	Commodore 16 Games Pack II	Melbourne House
Educa & Spel	Educational	1984	Dutch	Cassette C16S02	Courbois Software
Europe Quiz	Educational	1986	English	King Size Volume 1 & Volume 2	Robtek
Evasione (Jailbreak)	Logic	1985	Italian	Il Libro Dei Giochi Per Commodore 16 E Plus/4	J.Soft
Explorer (PLUG)	Adventure	1988	English	Plus/4 Program Pack	The Plus/4 Users' Group (PLUG)
Faltörés (Wallbreak)	Knockout	1986	Hungarian	Bemutató Programcsomag	Novotrade Magyarország; Octasoft
Ferry	Action	1986	Dutch	Cassette C1612	Courbois Software
Forcefield	Action	1986	English	King Size Volume 1 & Volume 2	Robtek
Frogs C16	Logic	Unknown	English	King Size Volume 1 & Volume 2	Robtek
Fruit Machine (Amvic)	Gambling	1986	English	20 Games	Amvic Services (AVS)
Fuga Dallo Spazio Profondo (Escape From Deep Space)	Adventure	1985	Italian	Il Libro Dei Giochi Per Commodore 16 E Plus/4	J.Soft
Galgje (Hangman)	Hangman	1985	Dutch	Cassette C1603	Courbois Software
Game Of 7's	Cards	Unknown	English	King Size Volume 1 & Volume 2	Robtek
Game Of Kings	HanoiTower	1986	English	20 Games	Amvic Services (AVS)
Ganymede	Management	1984	English	Commodore 16 Games Pack II	Melbourne House
Getal Raden Extra (Number Guessing)	Logic	1986	Dutch	Cassette C1609	Courbois Software
Golden Software Casino Dadi (Golden Software Casino Dices)	Dices	1985	Italian	Casinò (Golden Software)	Golden Software; Soft
Golden Software Casino Slot Machine	Gambling	1985	Italian	Casinò (Golden Software)	Golden Software; Soft
Goldrush (Courbois)	Action	1984	Dutch	Cassette C1601	Courbois Software
Graphic Twister	Logic	1986	English	Can Of Worms	Livewire Software
Green Beret	Action	1986	English	4 Konami Coin-op Hits	Imagine Software
Gun Fight	Action	1986	English	King Size Volume 1 & Volume 2	Robtek
Hangman	Hangman	1984	English	Commodore 16 Games Pack I	Melbourne House
Hangman (Amvic)	Hangman	1986	English	20 Games	Amvic Services (AVS)
Hangman (Commodore)	Hangman	1984	English	Super Spell	Commodore
Hangman (PLUG)	Hangman	1988	English	Plus/4 Program Pack	The Plus/4 Users' Group (PLUG)
Hartenjagen (Chasing Hearts)	Cards	1985	Dutch	Cassette C1604	Courbois Software
Hebbes (Got You)	Dices	1985	Dutch	Cassette C1605	Courbois Software
Hellgate	Shoot'em up	1987	English	Voidrunner + Hellgate	Ariolasoft
Het Klinkerspel (The Vowel Game)	Logic	1986	Dutch	Cassette C1609	Courbois Software
Higher Or Lower	Cards	Unknown	English	King Size Volume 1 & Volume 2	Robtek
Hoofdsteden Van Europa (Capitals Of Europe)	Trivia	1984	Dutch	Cassette C16S02	Courbois Software
Hunter (Basic)	PacMan	1984	English	Commodore 16 Games Pack II	Melbourne House
Hyper Sports	Sport	1985	English	4 Konami Coin-op Hits	Imagine Software
Hyphen	Educational	1984	English	Super Spell	Commodore
Invaders	SpaceInvaders	1984	English	Space Sweep & Invaders	Commodore
Invasion Fall	Action	1986	Dutch	Cassette C1611	Courbois Software
Irrgarten (Maze)	Maze	1984	German	Knobelspass II	Commodore
Jeff's Panel	Logic	1984	English	Mindbenders	Commodore
Jetpack Jack	Shoot'em up	Unknown	English	Astralog Four Pack	Astralog
Jigsaw	Jigsaw	1986	English	King Size Volume 1 & Volume 2	Robtek
Jolly Good Fellow	Action	1986	English	CSJ Games 1	ComputerSoft Jonigk (CSJ)
Jotto	Educational	1984	English	Super Spell	Commodore
Jumbo Jet Lander	Action	1986	English	Cassette C1614	Courbois Software
Jumping Amsterdam	Action	1985	Dutch	Cassette C1604	Courbois Software
Keresztcsere (Cross Swap)	Logic	1986	Hungarian	Keresztcsere Szoliter	Novotrade Magyarország
Kniffel (Dutch)	Dices	1986	Dutch	Cassette C1612	Courbois Software
Kniffel 16	Dices	1986	German	C16/C116 Programmsammlung	Markt & Technik (M&T)
Knights Move	Board	1986	English	Can Of Worms	Livewire Software
Kruis-Puzzel (Cross Puzzle)	SlidePuzzle	1985	Dutch	Cassette C1605	Courbois Software
La Macchina Del Tempo (Time Machine)	Adventure	1985	Italian	La Macchina Del Tempo / Calcolo Dell'Equo Canone	Mantra Software
La Torre Misteriosa (The Mysterious Tower)	HanoiTower	1985	Italian	La Torre Misteriosa / Conto Corrente	Mantra Software
Labirinto 3-D (Labyrinth 3-D)	Maze	1985	Italian	Il Libro Dei Giochi Per Commodore 16 E Plus/4	J.Soft
Labyrinth	Maze	1984	English	Mindbenders	Commodore
Landmijn (Minefield)	Minesweeper	1986	Dutch	Cassette C1611	Courbois Software
Laser Zone	Shoot'em up	1986	English	Matrix And Laserzone	Ariolasoft
Laza!	Shoot'em up	1988	English	C16 Compilation	Mastertronic
Letter Slider	SlidePuzzle	1984	English	Mindbenders	Commodore
Letterbox	Action	1984	English	Commodore 16 Games Pack II	Melbourne House
Lone Survivor	Adventure	1985	English	Lone Survivor / Wacky Painter	Tynesoft Computer Software (Tynesoft)
Looney Landa	Landing	1984	English	Commodore 16 Games Pack I	Melbourne House
Lovascsata (Knights' Battle)	Board	1986	Hungarian	Bemutató Programcsomag	Novotrade Magyarország
Magic Square	Logic	1984	English	Mindbenders	Commodore
Master Brain	Logic	1986	English	King Size Volume 1 & Volume 2	Robtek
Mastermind	MasterMind	1986	English	King Size Volume 1 & Volume 2	Robtek
Math Mania	Educational	1984	English	Math Games And Word Problems	Commodore
Math Quiz	Educational	1988	English	Plus/4 Program Pack	The Plus/4 Users' Group (PLUG)
Maths Grid	Educational	1986	English	20 Games	Amvic Services (AVS)
Matrix	Centipede	1986	English	Matrix And Laserzone	Ariolasoft
Maxit (Courbois)	Board	1985	Dutch	Cassette C1601	Courbois Software
Maze	Maze	1984	English	Maze Mania	Commodore
Micro Minotaur	Logic	1984	English	Commodore 16 Games Pack I	Melbourne House
Micropainter	Amidar	1986	English	Azimuth Head Alignment Tape	Interceptor Software
Mind Quiz	MasterMind	1984	English	Commodore 16 Games Pack II	Melbourne House
Miner (Astralog)	Action	Unknown	English	Astralog Four Pack	Astralog
Minotaur	Logic	1984	English	Commodore 16 Games Pack II	Melbourne House
Mole Attack	Action	1985	Dutch	Cassette C1601	Courbois Software
Mondo Di Colori (World Of Colors)	MasterMind	1985	Italian	Il Libro Dei Giochi Per Commodore 16 E Plus/4	J.Soft
Moonbase	Action	1986	English	King Size Volume 1 & Volume 2	Robtek
Moord In Het Flatgebouw (Murder in the Apartment Building)	Adventure	1986	Dutch	Cassette C1606	Courbois Software
Mouse Maze	Action	1984	English	Maze Mania	Commodore
Multy	Educational	1984	Dutch	Cassette C16S02	Courbois Software
Napoleone (Napoleon)	Cards	1985	Italian	2Games: Black Jack Napoleone	Visiogame
Nim (Amvic)	Logic	1986	English	20 Games	Amvic Services (AVS)
No Exit (German)	Maze	1986	German/English	C16/C116 Programmsammlung	Markt & Technik (M&T)
Numbers	Logic	Unknown	English	King Size Volume 1 & Volume 2	Robtek
Number-toe	Educational	1984	English	Math Games And Word Problems	Commodore
Oliemagnaat (Oil Magnate)	Strategy	1985	Dutch	Cassette C1604	Courbois Software
Onder Elkaar (Among Each Other)	Educational	1984	Dutch	Cassette C16S02	Courbois Software
Othello (Mantra)	Othello	1985	Italian	Il Labirinto Maledetto / Othello	Mantra Software
Othello (Tri-Micro)	Othello	1986	English	King Size Volume 1 & Volume 2	Robtek
Pacman Junior	Action	1986	English	King Size Volume 1 & Volume 2	Robtek
Panzer Duel	Action	1987	English	Triple Decker 6	Alternative Software Limited
Paramaths	Educational	1984	English	Sandcastles And Paramaths	Commodore
Paroliamo	Logic	1985	Italian	Il Libro Dei Giochi Per Commodore 16 E Plus/4	J.Soft
Paroliamo (Mantra)	Logic	1985	Italian	Wargames / Paroliamo	Mantra Software
Passage	Action	1986	English	King Size Volume 1 & Volume 2	Robtek
Penetrator	Action	1984	English	Commodore 16 Games Pack I	Melbourne House
Petopoly	Management	1986	English	Cassette C1607	Courbois Software
Pilot X	Action	1985	English	Space 2	Midas Marketing
Pinball (Commodore)	Action	1986	English	King Size Volume 1 & Volume 2	Robtek
Ping Pong	Sport	1986	English	4 Konami Coin-op Hits	Imagine Software
Pirate Adventure C16	Adventure	Unknown	English	Scott Adams Scoops	Master Games
Pista Pericolosa (Dangerous Track)	Board	1985	Italian	Il Libro Dei Giochi Per Commodore 16 E Plus/4	J.Soft
Planet Search	Shoot'em up	1986	English	Bounder And Planet Search	Gremlin Graphics
Poker (Italian)	Cards	1985	Italian	I Giochi Di Società	Editoriale Video
Poker Ass	Cards	1986	German	C16/C116 Programmsammlung	Markt & Technik
Poker Jack	Cards	Unknown	Italian	Savage Collection N.3	Savage Software
Pontoon (Amvic)	Cards	1986	English	20 Games	Amvic Services
Predictor	Gambling	1986	English	Cassette C1615	Courbois Software
Puntolino (Dotty)	Logic	1985	Italian	Il Libro Dei Giochi Per Commodore 16 E Plus/4	J.Soft
Puzzler	Logic	Unknown	English	King Size Volume 1 & Volume 2	Robtek
Pyramide (King Size)	Cards	1986	English	King Size Volume 1 & Volume 2	Robtek
Pyramide (Tri-Micro)	Cards	Unknown	English	Rainy Day II	Pacific Tri Micro, Inc.
Quest	Adventure	Unknown	English	King Size Volume 1 & Volume 2	Robtek
Ravijn (Canyon)	Action	1984	Dutch	Cassette C1601	Courbois Software
Rebound (Basic)	Logic	Unknown	English	King Size Volume 1 & Volume 2	Robtek
Reel Thing	Gambling	1984	English	Commodore 16 Games Pack II	Melbourne House
Rekenen (To Calculate)	Educational	1984	Dutch	Cassette C16S02	Courbois Software
Repeat After Me	Simon	1984	English	Mindbenders	Commodore
Reverse	Educational	1984	English	Math Games And Word Problems	Commodore
Reverse (Italian)	Othello	1985	Italian	I Giochi Di Società	Editoriale Video
Reversi (Dutch)	Logic	1986	Dutch	Cassette C1607	Courbois Software
Reversi (Savage)	Othello	1985	Italian	Savage Collection N.2	Savage Software
Rij Test (Driving Test)	Action	Unknown	Dutch	Cassette C1602	Courbois Software
Rijbaan (Roadway)	Logic	Unknown	Dutch	Cassette C1602	Courbois Software
Road Patrol	Action	1984	English	Commodore 16 Games Pack II	Melbourne House
Robot 3.5	Action	1986	German	C16/C116 Programmsammlung	Markt & Technik
Rocce (Rocks)	Action	1985	Italian	Il Libro Dei Giochi Per Commodore 16 E Plus/4	J.Soft
Rockets	Action	1984	English	Maze Mania	Commodore
Rollercoaster	Action	1986	Dutch	Cassette C1615	Courbois Software
Rotation	Logic	1984	English	Mindbenders	Commodore
Roulette	Gambling	1985	Italian	I Giochi Di Società	Editoriale Video
Roulette (Courbois)	Gambling	1986	German/French	Cassette C1609	Courbois Software
Roulette (J.Soft)	Gambling	1985	Italian	Il Libro Dei Giochi Per Commodore 16 E Plus/4	J.Soft
S.A.M.	Action	1984	English	Commodore 16 Games Pack I	Melbourne House
Samsara	Logic	1986	Dutch	Cassette C1606	Courbois Software
Sandcastles	Educational	1984	English	Sandcastles And Paramaths	Commodore
Scramble 5	Educational	1984	English	Super Spell	Commodore
Scramble 8	Educational	1984	English	Super Spell	Commodore
Scrambler	Action	1984	English	Commodore 16 Games Pack II	Melbourne House
Shuffle	SlidePuzzle	1986	English	20 Games	Amvic Services
Siege	Action	1984	English	Commodore 16 Games Pack I	Melbourne House
Simon	Simon	1986	English	King Size Volume 1 & Volume 2	Robtek
Slalom (Dutch)	Action	1986	Dutch	Cassette C1615	Courbois Software
Slide Puzzle	SlidePuzzle	1986	English	Can Of Worms	Livewire Software
Slots (Robtek)	Logic	1986	English	King Size Volume 1 & Volume 2	Robtek
Smash (King Size)	Action	1986	English	King Size Volume 1 & Volume 2	Robtek
Snake Pit	Tron	1984	English	Commodore 16 Games Pack II	Melbourne House
Snakes	Tron	1984	English	Maze Mania	Commodore
Snakey (King Size)	Tron	1986	English	King Size Volume 1 & Volume 2	Robtek
Solgor!	Logic	1986	English	?	Amvic Services (AVS)
Solitaire (Amvic)	Cards	1986	English	20 Games	Amvic Services
Solitaire (Dutch)	PegSolitaire	1986	Dutch	Cassette C1607	Courbois Software
Spaccamattoni (Bricksbreaker)	Knockout	1985	Italian	Il Libro Dei Giochi Per Commodore 16 E Plus/4	J.Soft
Space Fighter	Action	1986	English	King Size Volume 1 & Volume 2	Robtek
Space Sweep	Shoot'em up	1984	English	Space Sweep & Invaders	Commodore
Spacecraft Sim	Landing	Unknown	English	King Size Volume 1 & Volume 2	Robtek
Spaced Out	Adventure	1985	English	The Commodore Plus/4 Adventure Pack	Duckworth Computing
Spacemaze	Action	Unknown	English	King Size Volume 1 & Volume 2	Robtek
Speed Spell 2	Educational	1984	English	Super Spell	Commodore
Speed Spell 7	Educational	1984	English	Super Spell	Commodore
Speedboat Grand Prix	Race	1986	English	Sports 4	Anco
Stack 16	HanoiTower	Unknown	English	King Size Volume 1 & Volume 2	Robtek
Star Maze	Maze	1986	English	King Size Volume 1 & Volume 2	Robtek
Star Trader	Management	1984	English	King Size Volume 1 & Volume 2	Robtek
Stellar Wars	Shoot'em up	1984	English	C16 Super Games 1	Commodore
Sterren Spel (Stars Game)	Logic	Unknown	Dutch	Cassette C1602	Courbois Software
Story Problems	Educational	1984	English	Math Games And Word Problems	Commodore
Strange Odyssey C16	Adventure	Unknown	English	Scott Adams Scoops	Master Games
Sun Street	Action	1986	English	CSJ Games 1	ComputerSoft Jonigk (CSJ)
Super Maze	Action	1986	English	King Size Volume 1 & Volume 2	Robtek
Super Poker (Visiogame)	Cards	1985	Italian	2Games: Super Poker Briscola	Visiogame
Super Quiz	MasterMind	1986	English	King Size Volume 1 & Volume 2	Robtek
Super Snake	Nibbler	1986	English	King Size Volume 1 & Volume 2	Robtek
Supermind	MasterMind	Unknown	German/French/Spanish	?	Systems
Supermind (Cassette C1614)	MasterMind	1986	Dutch	Cassette C1614	Courbois Software
Surround	Tron	1984	German	Surround / Balance / Tricky Dices	Data Media GmbH
Syndrome (Game)	Action	1985	English	Syndrome Compilation	Jaysoft
Szoliter (Solitaire)	PegSolitaire	1986	Hungarian	Keresztcsere Szoliter	Novotrade Magyarország
Take-out	Logic	1986	English	Can Of Worms	Livewire Software
Tank Ambush	Action	1984	English	Commodore 16 Games Pack II	Melbourne House
Tank Block	Action	1985	English	Syndrome Compilation	Jaysoft
Target	Nibbler	1985	Dutch	Cassette C1601	Courbois Software
Tennis	Sport	1986	English	Kingsoft Sport Show	Kingsoft
Tesoro Perduto (Lost Treasure)	Action	1985	Italian	Il Libro Dei Giochi Per Commodore 16 E Plus/4	J.Soft
The Tower	Adventure	1986-01	English	King Size Volume 1 & Volume 2	Robtek
Three of a Kind	Logic	1986	English	20 Games	Amvic Services
Tic Tac Arithmetic	Educational	1984	English	Math Games And Word Problems	Commodore
Tic-tac	Logic	1985	Italian	Tic-tac / Il Castello Dell'Asino	Mantra Software
Tic-tac-toe (Courbois)	TicTacToe	1985	Dutch	Cassette C1605	Courbois Software
Tombola	Gambling	1985	Italian	I Giochi Di Società	Editoriale Video
Topper	Board	Unknown	English	King Size Volume 1 & Volume 2	Robtek
Torre Di Hanoi (J.Soft) (Tower of Hanoi)	HanoiTower	1985	Italian	Il Libro Dei Giochi Per Commodore 16 E Plus/4	J.Soft
Track Test	Action	1986	English	King Size Volume 1 & Volume 2	Robtek
Treinbaan (Train Track)	Educational	1985	Dutch	Cassette C1605	Courbois Software
Tricky Dices	Dices	1984	German	Surround / Balance / Tricky Dices	Data Media GmbH
Trovamine (Minesweeper)	Action	1985	Italian	Il Libro Dei Giochi Per Commodore 16 E Plus/4	J.Soft
True Spit	Adventure	1985	English	The Commodore Plus/4 Adventure Pack	Duckworth Computing
U-Boot (AMA)	Strategy	1988	German	Plus-Paket (AMA)	Andysoft
UFO Stacker	HanoiTower	1986	English	Can Of Worms	Livewire Software
Underground Adventure	Adventure	1985	English	The Commodore Plus/4 Adventure Pack	Duckworth Computing
Unscramble!	SlidePuzzle	1984	English	Commodore 16 Games Pack I	Melbourne House
US Drag Racing	Sport	1984	English	Four Great Games	MicroValue
Vals Spelen (Cheating)	Cards	1986	Dutch	Cassette C1606	Courbois Software
Voidrunner	Centipede	1987	English	Voidrunner + Hellgate	Ariolasoft
Voodoo Castle	Adventure	Unknown	English	Scott Adams Scoops	Master Games
Wacky Painter	Amidar	1985	English	Lone Survivor / Wacky Painter	Tynesoft Computer Software (Tynesoft)
Warlock	RPG	1984	English	Commodore 16 Games Pack I	Melbourne House
Westward Ho!	RPG	1988	English	Plus/4 Program Pack	The Plus/4 Users' Group (PLUG)
Woordrobot 4 (Word Robot 4)	Educational	1984	Dutch	Cassette C16S02	Courbois Software
Word Search	Logic	1984	English	Mindbenders	Commodore
Wrap	Tron	1986	(none)	King Size Volume 1 & Volume 2	Robtek
Wurmi	Nibbler	1986	German	C16/C116 Programmsammlung	Markt & Technik
Xzap	Shoot'em up	1984	English	The Commodore 16 Showcase	Commodore
Yahtzee	Dices	1986	English	King Size Volume 1 & Volume 2	Robtek
Yathzee	Dices	1986	Dutch	Cassette C1615	Courbois Software
Yhatzee	Dices	1986	English	20 Games	Amvic Services
Zapp	Action	1984	English	Commodore 16 Games Pack I	Melbourne House
Zig Zago	Logic	Unknown	Dutch	Cassette C1602	Courbois Software

== Disk magazines ==
There are 99 games released on 56 disk magazines, excluding clones and hacks.

Title	Genre	Release date	Language	Disk magazine	Publisher
3D Maze	Maze	1985-11	English	C16 Plus4 Computing Issue #4	Argus Press Software (APS)
Asteroid Belt	Action	1985	English	C16 Plus4 Computing Issue #6	Argus Press Software (APS)
Asteroidi (Asteroids)	Action	1986-04	Italian	Super Commodore 16 Plus/4 VIC20 1	Gruppo Editoriale Jackson (Jackson)
Avventura Nel Deserto (Adventure in the Desert)	RPG	1986	Italian	Super Commodore 16 Plus/4 VIC20 3	Gruppo Editoriale Jackson (Jackson)
Avventura Sul Pianeta X (Adventure on Planet X)	Adventure	1985-11	Italian	Linguaggio Macchina 16/20 7	Edizioni Foglia
Batbusters	Shoot'em up	Unknown	English	Software Club #14	Systems
Battaglia Navale (Battleships)	Battleships	1986-04	Italian	Super Commodore 16 Plus/4 VIC20 1	Gruppo Editoriale Jackson (Jackson)
Battaglia Navale (Softwell) (Battleships (Softwell))	Battleships	1985-04	Italian	Computer Games E Utilities N.3 Anno 2	Ed. Softwell Milano (Softwell)
Billiards	Sport	1985-07	English	C16 Plus4 Computing Issue #1	Argus Press Software (APS)
Bio Invaders	Action	1986	English/Italian/German	Software Club #10	Systems
Bombardiere (Softwell) (Bomber (Softwell))	RPG	1985	Italian	Computer Games E Utilities N.1 Anno 3 Supplemento	Ed. Softwell Milano (Softwell)
Botta E Risposta (Give And Take)	Simon	1985-11	Italian	Super Commodore 16 2	J.Soft
Boxing	Sport	1985-10	English	C16 Plus4 Computing Issue #3	Argus Press Software (APS)
Brain Master	MasterMind	1985-11	Italian	Linguaggio Macchina 16/20 7	Edizioni Foglia
Brick-it	Action	1985-07	English	C16 Plus4 Computing Issue #1	Argus Press Software (APS)
C16 Memory	Memory	1985	Italian	Play On Tape Computer 8	Editoriale Video
Caccia Alla Talpa (Mole Hunting)	Action	1986-03	Italian	Videoteca Computer 11	Editoriale Video
Caccia Pitagorica (Pitagoric Hunt)	Educational	1985-10	Italian	Jackson Soft Compilation 6	Gruppo Editoriale Jackson (Jackson)
Card Game	Cards	1987-03	Italian	Go Games 18	Edizioni Fermont
Casa Stregata (Haunted House)	Action	1985	Italian	Jackson Soft Compilation 4	Gruppo Editoriale Jackson (Jackson)
Chinadam	Board	1986-01	Italian	Linguaggio Macchina 16/20 9	Edizioni Foglia
Chiudi La Porta (Close the Door)	Logic	1985-02	Italian	Commodore Club #4	Systems
Cobra	Nibbler	1985-09	Italian	Commodore Club #8	Systems
Colour Search	MasterMind	1985	Italian	Play On Tape Computer 6	Editoriale Video
Connector	Board	1985-12	English	C16 Plus4 Computing Issue #5	Argus Press Software (APS)
Coppie Nascoste (Hidden Pairs)	Memory	1985-12	Italian	Super Commodore 16 3	J.Soft
Crazy Horses	Gambling	1985-12	Italian	Super Commodore 16 3	J.Soft
Dama (Systems) (Draughts (Systems))	Draughts	1985-02	Italian	Commodore Club #4	Systems
Derby	Gambling	1986-11	English	Software Club #13	Systems
Destructor (Byte Games 29)	Shoot'em up	1989-03	English	Byte Games 29	Computer Edizioni (Edisoft)
Diamond	Platformer	1987	English	Software Club #15	Systems
Difesa (Jackson) (Defence (Jackson))	Shoot'em up	1985-04	Italian	Jackson Soft Compilation 4	Gruppo Editoriale Jackson (Jackson)
Fantatron	Shoot'em up	1985-06	Italian	Commodore Club #7	Systems
Filetto (Editoriale Video)	TicTacToe	1985	Italian	Play On Tape Computer 9	Editoriale Video
Flipper Cinese (Chinese Pinball)	Pinball	1986	Italian	Video Basic 15	Editoriale Video
Flugsimulator (Flight Simulator)	Simulator	1986	German	RUN-O-THEK	CW-Publikationen Verlags GmbH
Frog (Systems)	Frogger	1987	English	Software Club #17	Systems
Froggy (APS)	Frogger	1985-09	English	C16 Plus4 Computing Issue #2	Argus Press Software (APS)
Fruit Game	Action	1987	English	Software Club #15	Systems
Fury (Systems)	Action	1987	English	Software Club #17	Systems
Gran Premio (Grand Prix)	Maze	Unknown	Italian	Software Club #11	Systems
GTE	TicTacToe	1986	English	Software Club German 5	Systems
Guida Pericolosa (Hazardous Driving)	Action	1986-04	Italian	Super Commodore 16 Plus/4 VIC20 1	Gruppo Editoriale Jackson (Jackson)
Hat In The Ring	Management	1985	Italian	Play On Tape Computer 7	Editoriale Video
Hunter (Go Games 22)	Action	1987-07	Italian	Go Games 22	Edizioni Fermont
Identikit	Memory	1986	Italian/German/French/Spanish	Software Club #10	Systems
Intelligenza (Intelligence)	TicTacToe	1985-06	Italian	Commodore Club #7	Systems
Intervallo (Interval)	Action	1985	Italian	Video Basic 13	Gruppo Editoriale Jackson (Jackson)
Invasione (Jackson) (Invasion (Jackson))	Shoot'em up	Unknown	Italian	Jackson Soft Compilation 1 Nuova Serie	Gruppo Editoriale Jackson (Jackson)
Kalah (Systems)	Cards	1985-09	Italian	Commodore Club #8	Systems
Killer	Shoot'em up	1986	Italian	Video Basic 5	Gruppo Editoriale Jackson (Jackson)
Kniffel (1985)	Dices	1985-08	German	RUN Programmsammlung 2	CW-Publikationen Verlags GmbH
La Casa Di Ghiaccio (Ice's House)	Maze	1985-05	Italian	Computer Games E Utilities N.4 Anno 2	Ed. Softwell Milano (Softwell)
La città del Futuro (The city of Future)	Adventure	1985-04	Italian	Commodore C16 / 4 Plus Vol. I	Programma 2000 (P 2000)
La Macchina Del Tempo (Jackson) (Time Machine (Jackson))	Adventure	1986-05	Italian	Super Commodore 16 Plus/4 VIC20 2	Gruppo Editoriale Jackson (Jackson)
Labirinto (Labyrinth)	Othello	1985-04	Italian	Commodore Club #6	Systems
Last Drow	Action	1986	Italian	Video Basic 3	Gruppo Editoriale Jackson (Jackson)
Le Coppie (Couples)	Memory	1986	Italian	Video Basic 13	Gruppo Editoriale Jackson (Jackson)
Light Lines	Tron	1985-10	English	C16 Plus4 Computing Issue #3	Argus Press Software (APS)
Memoria (Memory)	Memory	1985-04	Italian	Commodore C16 / 4 Plus Vol. I	Programma 2000 (P 2000)
Millepiedi (Centipede)	Centipede	1986-10	Italian	Go Games 13	Edizioni Fermont
Missione Calypso (Mission Calypso)	Strategy	1985	Italian	Play On Tape Computer 10	Editoriale Video
Monster	HanoiTower	1986	English	Software Club German 5	Systems
Moto-cross	Action	1985-04	Italian	Commodore C16 / 4 Plus Vol. I	Programma 2000 (P 2000)
My Little Pet	PacMan	1987-10	English	Software Club #16	Systems
New York	Logic	9/6/1985	Italian	Jackson Soft Compilation 6	Gruppo Editoriale Jackson (Jackson)
Othello (Softwell)	Othello	1985-04	Italian	Computer Games E Utilities N.3 Anno 2	Ed. Softwell Milano (Softwell)
Parol	Logic	1985	Italian	Play On Tape Computer 9	Editoriale Video
Paroliere (Word Hunt)	Logic	1985-10	Italian	Super Commodore 16 1	J.Soft
Poker (Editoriale Video)	Cards	1985	Italian	Play On Tape Computer 7	Editoriale Video
Poker (Systems)	Cards	1985-04	Italian	Commodore Club #6	Systems
Quadrati (Editoriale Video) (Squares (Editoriale Video))	Logic	1985	Italian	Play On Tape Computer 8	Editoriale Video
Quick Fish	Action	1987-10	English	Software Club #16	Systems
Quindici 3-D (Fifteen 3-D)	SlidePuzzle	1985	Italian	Play On Tape Computer 7	Editoriale Video
Rallybruco (Rallygrub)	Action	1985-11	Italian	Super Commodore 16 2	J.Soft
Redknight	Adventure	1986-03	Italian	Videoteca Computer 11	Editoriale Video
Rescue	Action	Unknown	English	Software Club #14	Systems
Riflessometro (Reflex-o-meter)	Action	1985	Italian	Play On Tape Computer 8	Editoriale Video
Scramble (APS)	Shoot'em up	1985-07	English	C16 Plus4 Computing Issue #1	Argus Press Software (APS)
Shot	Action	1987-10	English	Software Club #16	Systems
Simon Magico (Magic Simon)	Mastermind	Unknown	Italian	Software Club #11	Systems
Simula2	Simulator	1985-04	Italian	Commodore C16 / 4 Plus Vol. I	Programma 2000 (P 2000)
Simulazione Di Volo (Flight Simulation)	Action	1985	Italian	Computer Games E Utilities N.7 Anno 2	Ed. Softwell Milano (Softwell)
Simulvolo (Simulflight)	Simulator	1985-04	Italian	Commodore C16 / 4 Plus Vol. I	Programma 2000 (P 2000)
Sixteen Terror	Action	1985-09	English	C16 Plus4 Computing Issue #2	Argus Press Software (APS)
Slot Machine (Videoteca Computer 11)	Gambling	1986-03	Italian	Videoteca Computer 11	Editoriale Video
Space 1999	Shoot'em up	1986-11	English	Software Club #13	Systems
Sparacaratteri (Charsshooter)	Educational	1986-01	Italian	Video Basic 1	Gruppo Editoriale Jackson (Jackson)
Survival	Management	1985-11	English	C16 Plus4 Computing Issue #4	Argus Press Software (APS)
Tacman	PacMan	1986	Italian	Video Basic 4	Gruppo Editoriale Jackson (Jackson)
The Wall	Knockout	1986-11	English	Software Club #13	Systems
Tiro Alla Fune (Tug Of War)	Sport	1986	Italian	Video Basic 14	Gruppo Editoriale Jackson (Jackson)
Transector	Action	1985	English	C16 Plus4 Computing Issue #5	Argus Press Software (APS)
Type Test	Educational	1986	Italian	Computer Set 3	Publiflash
Wargame	Strategy	1985	Italian	Play On Tape Computer 6	Editoriale Video
Wave	Logic	1986	English	Software Club German 4	Systems
Wordsworth	Logic	1985-10	English	C16 Plus4 Computing Issue #3	Argus Press Software (APS)
Yatzee	Dices	1986	Italian	Video Basic 6	Gruppo Editoriale Jackson (Jackson)
Zap	Nibbler	1986-05	Italian	Super Commodore 16 Plus/4 VIC20 1	Gruppo Editoriale Jackson (Jackson)
