= Winter Olympics (disambiguation) =

The Winter Olympic Games are a quadrennial international winter sports competition.

Winter Olympics may also refer to:

- "Winter Olympics" (The Goodies), 1973 episode of television series The Goodies
- Winter Olympics (1986 video game)
- Winter Olympics (video game), 1994 video game
