= Loading screen =

Image shown by a computer program while loading or initializing

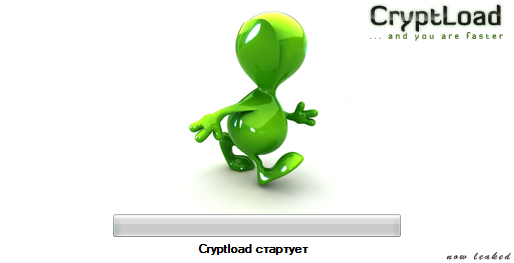
A loading screen

A loading screen is a screen shown by a computer program, very often a video game, while the program is loading (moving program data from the disk to RAM) or initializing.

A loading screen is a user interface element that appears while a computer program, application or video game completes background process or system initialization. Its purpose is to inform users that their system is still working and to provide feedback during delay. Loading screens may display animated graphics, rotating symbols or other indicators while complex calculations takes place in the background. As the internet became more accessible, two common types of loading indicators became widely used: the throbber, an animated icon that signifies ongoing activity, and the progress bar, a linear visual element that estimates the completion status and remaining loading time.

In early video games, the loading screen was also a chance for graphic artists to be creative without the technical limitations often required for the in-game graphics. Drawing utilities were also limited during this period. Melbourne Draw, one of the few 8-bit screen utilities with a zoom function, was one program of choice for artists.

While loading screens remain commonplace in video games, background loading is now used in many games, especially open world titles, to eliminate loading screens while traversing normally through the game, making them appear only when "teleporting" further than the load distance (e.g. using warps or fast travel) or moving faster than the game can load.

== Loading times ==
Loading screens that disguise the length of time a program takes to load were common when computer games were loaded from a cassette tape, a process which could take five minutes or more. Nowadays, most games are downloaded digitally, and therefore loaded off the hard drive meaning faster load times. However, some games are also loaded off of an optical disc, quicker than previous magnetic media, but still include loading screens to disguise the amount of time taken to initialize the game in RAM.

Since the loading screen data itself needs to be read from the media, it actually can increase the overall loading time. For example, with a ZX Spectrum game, the screen data takes up 6 kilobytes, representing an increase in loading time of about 13% over the same game without a loading screen. Recently, however, more powerful hardware has significantly diminished this effect.

== Variations ==
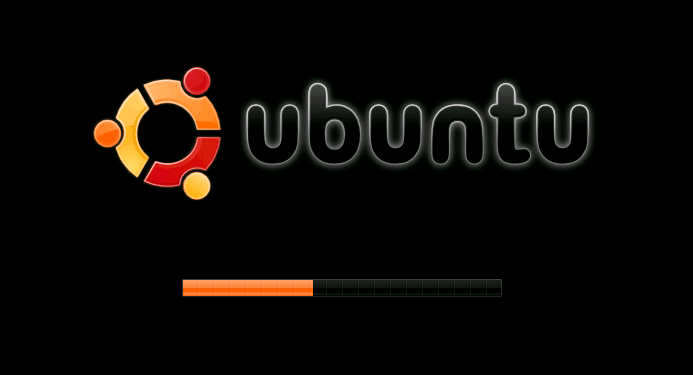
Loading screen of the Ubuntu operating system, displaying progress

The loading screen does not need to be a static picture. Some loading screens display a progress bar or a timer countdown to show how much data has actually loaded. Others, recently, are not even a picture at all, and are a small video or have parts animated in real time.

Variations such as the progress bar are sometimes programmed to inaccurately reflect the passage of time or extended during loading; opting instead for artificial pauses or stutters. This can be done in games for a multitude of reasons which includes encouraging players to engage with exposition during time away from gameplay and providing the player with an immersive transition between scenes. One notable example of this practice being used is for the real-time strategy game Age of Empires, where programmer Greg Street describes his method of timing visual loading queues with appropriate script queues when loading a randomly generated map. Other developers describe the necessity of an artificial loading timer despite technical advancement making modern loading times near-instantaneous to allow the player a smooth transition between gameplay segments. This technique has grounds in the perceived perception of performance denoted by loading times. This perception of loading times can be altered by factors such as the movement of a progress bar.

Other loading screens double as briefing screens, providing the user with information to read. This information may only be there for storytelling and/or entertainment or it can give the user information that is usable when the loading is complete, such as mission goals or useful gameplay tips. In fighting games, the loading screen is often a versus screen, which shows the fighters who will take part in the match.

=== Minigames ===
Some games have even included minigames in their loading screen, notably the 1983 Skyline Attack for the Commodore 64 and Joe Blade 2 on the ZX Spectrum. One well-known loader game was Invade-a-Load. Another example is "the shop keepers quiz" in Dota 2 which was more of a game finding screen rather than loading screen.

Namco has used playable mini-games during loading screens. Examples include variations of their old arcade games like Galaxian or Rally-X as loading screens when first booting up many of their early PlayStation releases. Even many years later, their PlayStation 2 games, like Tekken 5, still used the games to keep people busy while the game initially boots up. Despite the Invade-a-Load prior art, Namco filed a patent in 1995 that prevented other companies from having playable mini-games on their loading screens, which expired in 2015. EA Sports games have "warm up" sessions. For example, FIFA 11 has the player shooting free-kicks solo and NBA Live 10 has 2-player shootouts, while the game loads. NBA Live 08 features a 4-player general knowledge quiz. The PlayStation 3 and Xbox 360 versions of THQ's MX vs. ATV: Untamed lets the player partake in a free-ride session on the test course.

=== Cutscenes ===
Some games like a number of Call of Duty titles have cutscenes that give an introduction to the level while the game loads in the background. Normally, when the level is completely loaded, the remaining portion of the cutscene may be skipped. The video may not necessarily apply to what is happening in the level, as Red Faction: Guerrilla sometimes shows news reports foreshadowing events that will become important later on, or give tidbits about the game's universe.

=== Music ===
On the Commodore 64, tape loading screens would often have music in the form of a chiptune making use of the machine's advanced SID sound chip.

== See also ==
- Splash screen
- Title screen
