= Tynesoft =

Former software developer and publisher

Tynesoft Computer Software
- Industry: Video game industry
- Founded: 1983
- Defunct: 1990
- Headquarters: Blaydon, United Kingdom
- Products: Video games

Tynesoft Computer Software was a software developer and publisher in the 1980s.

== History ==
The company was founded in 1983 by Colin Courtney and Trevor Scott to release educational software but soon focused on video games. It developed games for 8-bit home computers, particularly those less well catered for by other publishers such as the Commodore 16, BBC Micro, and Atari 8-bit computers. They also had a budget label, MicroValue, that issued compilations, reissues and some original games.

They had most success with their multi-load games such as Summer Olympiad, Circus Games and Rodeo Games. They released licensed ports such as Software Projects' Jet Set Willy (Atari 8-bit, Commodore 16, Plus/4, BBC Micro, Acorn Electron), First Star Software's Boulder Dash (BBC, Electron) and Spy vs. Spy (C16, Plus/4, BBC, Electron) and Mindscape's Indoor Sports (C16, Plus/4, BBC, Electron). From the late 1980s, they released games for the Amiga and Atari ST as well as IBM PC compatibles, but failed to capture a significant share of this new market. The company went bankrupt in June 1990 when its sister printing business incurred massive debts.

== Legacy ==
Programmer Brian Jobling left the company in 1988 to set up Zeppelin Games with programmer and journalist Derek Brewster.

Colin Courtney set up a new company, Flair Software, which continued to use the MicroValue label for budget releases. Flair published one title that had originally been scheduled for release by Tynesoft, Elvira: The Arcade Game, but a reported conversion of Games Workshop's Blood Bowl never appeared. The company currently operates under the name Casual Arts and releases games for PC, Mac, Nintendo DS/3DS, iOS, Android and Kindle.

== Select titles ==
- 1984 Auf Wiedersehen Pet (Electron, BBC Micro, C64, ZSpectrum)
- 1984 Bingo (C64, Spectrum)
- 1984 Rig Attack (Electron, BBC, C16, Plus/4
- 1984 Olympiad (C16/+4)
- 1984 US Drag Racing (Electron, BBC, C16/+4)
- 1985 Ian Botham's Test Match (Electron, BBC, C64, Spectrum, C16/+4, Amstrad CPC)
- 1985 Super Gran (C64, Spectrum, C16/+4, CPC)
- 1985 Super Gran: The Adventure (Electron, BBC, C64, Spectrum, C16/+4)
- 1986 Future Shock (Electron, BBC, C16/+4)
- 1986 Commonwealth Games a.k.a. European Games (Electron, BBC, C64, C16/+4,[MSX)
- 1986 Mouse Trap (Electron, BBC, C64, Atari 8-bit, Atari ST, Amiga)
- 1986 Winter Olympics (Electron, BBC, C16/+4, Atari 8-bit, MSX)
- 1986 The Big KO (Electron, BBC, C64)
- 1987 Phantom (Electron, BBC, C64, C16/+4, Atari 8-bit)
- 1987 Mirax Force (Atari 8-bit)
- 1987 Who Dares Wins II (Atari 8-bit)
- 1988 Summer Olympiad (Electron, BBC, C64, Spectrum, ST, Amiga)
- 1988 Winter Olympiad '88 (Electron, BBC, C64, Spectrum, Atari 8-bit, ST, Amiga)
- 1989 Circus Games (Electron, BBC, C64, Spectrum, CPC, ST, Amiga, Apple II, MS-DOS)
- 1989 Superman: The Man of Steel (Electron, BBC, C64, Spectrum, CPC, ST, Amiga, MSX, Apple II, PC)
- 1989 Buffalo Bill's Rodeo Games a.k.a. Buffalo Bill's Wild West Rodeo Show (Electron, BBC, C64, Spectrum, CPC, ST, Amiga, Apple II, PC)
- 1989 Roller Coaster Rumbler (C64, ST, Amiga, PC)
- 1989 Mayday Squad (C64, ST, Amiga, PC)
- 1990 Beverly Hills Cop (BBC, C64, Spectrum, CPC, ST, Amiga, PC)
