= Spore (1987 video game) =

- Developer: Paul Rogers
- Publisher: Mastertronic
- Platforms: Commodore 64, Commodore 16, ZX Spectrum
- Release: NA: 1987
- Genre: Puzzle
- Mode: Single-player

Spore is a puzzle video game for the Commodore 64, Commodore 16, and ZX Spectrum, released by Mastertronic in 1987. Its title screen credits Jim Baguley with writing it, although Paul Rogers claims to have written it and its unreleased sequel, Mutant Zone. The music was composed by David Whittaker.

The game includes a level editor for users to create their own maps.

== Reception ==
Gameplay screenshot

Zzap!64 gave the Commodore 64 version 97% and a silver medal; Crash gave the ZX Spectrum version 67%.
