= Jack Attack =

1983 video game

- Publisher: Commodore
- Designers: Kevin Kieller; John Traynor
- Platforms: Commodore 64, Commodore 16, Plus/4.
- Release: EU: 1983; NA: 1983
- Genre: Platform
- Mode: Single-player

Jack Attack is a platform game for the Commodore 64 released on cartridge by Commodore in 1983. A version for the Commodore 16 and Plus/4 was also released in 1984. The game was named after Commodore's founder Jack Tramiel.

== Gameplay ==
Screenshot from the first level

Each level is laid out in a rectangular grid. The levels contain the player character, eight enemies, and a varying arrangement of blocks. The player's goal is to kill all the enemies without being killed by them. There are 64 levels in all.

The player character is able to push and pull blocks, which the player must use to kill the enemies and navigate the platforms. An enemy can be killed by being crushed either horizontally between two blocks or by the player character or a block falling down on it. On the other hand, the player character dies if a block or an enemy falls on top of it. Enemies are unable to push or pull blocks. Some levels include water, which is fatal to the player character, but safe to enemies.

While killing all enemies completes the levels, some levels also add bonuses for jumping on every platform. These platforms disappear after a set time limit and are usually only accessible by arranging the blocks in a certain way adding a puzzle element to the game. A time bonus is also awarded for quickly completing a level.

== Development ==
The game was developed by students Kevin Kieller and John Traynor for the VIC-20 and originally named Cubic Critters. After showing the game to Commodore sales reps at a computer show they were invited to the company's Toronto offices to strike a publishing deal. Commodore felt the name was too close to Q*bert and after being unable to settle on a new name, the writers asked the Commodore team to name it. The game was then renamed as an in joke after the company's founder Jack Tramiel. Kieller said "We were led to believe that certain people at Commodore felt Jack Tramiel looked like the red-face critter when he was upset. According to our Commodore contacts, if Jack Tramiel was upset and yelling at you it was known as a Jack Attack." This was confirmed by Commodore marketing strategist Michael Tomczyk. "He chuckled when we named one of the games Jack Attack, which was an inside joke. Jack was short and round in stature but had a deep booming voice that could shake the walls. I don't think he realized the meaning of Jack Attack but he knew it was about him. He never said much about it, he just allowed it to happen."

A VIC-20 version was created but not released.

== Reception ==
Ahoy! stated that Jack Attack was a "dynamic puzzle" game like Lode Runner, but "stresses action and trap-setting".
