= Mirax Force =

1987 video game

- Developer: Chris Murray
- Publishers: Tynesoft; Zeppelin Games
- Platform: Atari 8-bit
- Release: 1987
- Genre: Scrolling shooter

Mirax Force is a horizontally scrolling shooter video game written by Chris Murray and published by Tynesoft in 1987 for Atari 8-bit computers. The game is heavily inspired by Uridium, which was released a year earlier.

== Gameplay ==
The background color changes every time the player loses a life (Atari 8-bit screenshot).

The player's mission in Mirax Force is to fly a fighter called Star Quest over the gigantic alien mothership, destroying as much of the main superstructure as possible, with the ultimate goal being the mothership's reactor. Many hazards such as tall pylons or buildings must be avoided, and while doing so, the player will come under intense attack from waves of defender ships protecting the mothership. The player's ship flies at a fixed altitude just above the surface of the mothership, with the screen scrolling horizontally in both directions.

== Reception ==
Mirax Force received very positive reviews. In the review for Atari User magazine, Neil Fawcett found the game's graphics and colors superb, together making "a stunning display". Similarly, Robert Fripp, who reviewed the game for Aktueller Software Markt magazine, ended his positive review with the words, "Buy this thing!".
