= Mouse Trap (1986 video game) =

1986 video game

- Publisher: Tynesoft
- Designer: Brian Jobling
- Programmers: BBC/Electron; Dave Mann; Atari 8-bit Brian Jobling
- Platforms: Acorn Electron, Amiga, Atari 8-bit, Atari ST, BBC Micro, Commodore 64
- Release: 1986
- Genre: Platform

Mouse Trap is a platform game written by Dave Mann (using the pseudonym Chris Robson) and published by Tynesoft in 1986 for the Acorn Electron and BBC Micro home computers. One year later the game was released for the Atari 8-bit computers, Atari ST, Amiga, and Commodore 64.

== Gameplay ==
Marvin uses a swing to get to the second part of the level on Atari 8-bit.

The player takes on the role of a mouse named Marvin, who must complete 21 stages fraught with traps to reach a piece of cheese. The player must collect all the items (varying from cakes to balloons) from the level within a certain time, which will open an exit to which they must go to complete the level. Along the way, the player must avoid contact with moving (and stationary) objects (except platforms and elevators) and falling from too high a height, resulting in loss of life and restarting the level.

== Reception ==
Mouse Trap received very mixed reviews. Michael Kohl for Aktueller Software Markt found the graphics "colorful and pretty to look at", recommending it to every Amiga user. Raze magazine criticized the "dated graphics and poor sound" and rated the game 37%.
