= Spiky Harold =

1986 video game

- Developer: Andrew Rogers
- Publisher: Firebird Software
- Platforms: Amstrad CPC, Atari 8-bit, C16 / Plus/4, Commodore 64, ZX Spectrum
- Release: 1986
- Genre: Platform

Spiky Harold is a platform video game written by Andrew Rogers and published by Firebird Software in 1986. It was released for Amstrad CPC, Atari 8-bit computers, Commodore 16 / Plus/4, Commodore 64, and ZX Spectrum home computers.

== Plot ==
As winter approaches, a hedgehog named Harold must get ready for hibernation by gathering food that is buried beneath the hedgerows.

== Gameplay ==
Atari 8-bit screenshot

Spiky Harold is a flip-screen platform game in which the player moves the protagonist, Harold, from room to room collecting various objects. The goal of this game is to collect enough food for Harold the hedgehog to survive on while hibernating. The necessities are strewn across and below a big hedgerow. Coins that grant extra lives, wine glasses that change Harold's directions, apples, and other food items are among the numerous things that need to be collected. Unfortunately, all the objects are guarded by wasps, rodents, sulfur clouds, and bouncing balls. All the items have to be collected within the 24 hours displayed on the clock at the bottom of the screen. If the player is successful in gathering all of the required materials within the specified time, they must then deliver Harold back to his pad, where he can sleep the winter away.

== Reception ==
Spiky Harold received mixed reviews. Commodore User reviewer complained about the slow, repetitive gameplay and dire music detracting a lot from what could have been a good game. Stuart Kirkham writing for the Computer Gamer magazine summed up Spiky Harold as a good platform game that has plenty of entertainment to offer for a small price.
