= Tomcat (video game) =

1989 video game

- BBC/Electron cassette cover
- Developers: Nigel Speight (Amstrad), Adam Polanski (BBC/Electron), Darron M Broad (C16, Plus/4), Ian Denny (C64), Steve Burrows (Spectrum)
- Publisher: Players Software
- Platforms: Acorn Electron, BBC Micro, Amstrad CPC, Commodore 16 / Plus/4, Commodore 64, ZX Spectrum
- Release: 1989
- Genre: Scrolling shooter
- Mode: Single-player

Tomcat (also known as F14 Tomcat) is a video game published in 1989 in the UK by Players Software. The game was released on the Acorn Electron, BBC Micro, Commodore 16, Plus/4, Commodore 64, Amstrad CPC, and ZX Spectrum as a budget title. It was also on a Your Sinclair magazine cover tape. Tomcat is a vertically scrolling shooter in which the player takes control of an F14 Tomcat fighter aircraft, shooting at both air and ground targets whilst flying over four levels.

== Plot ==
ZX Spectrum screenshot

The game is set in the future, some time after the first half of the 21st century. Materials science has progressed such that human civilisation has found a way to cheaply build many artificial islands. The game is set on one such island, called ARTROCK 6 which is a completely automated defence installation. Due to a freak storm damaging the controlling software, the island has turned against its own side and has started attacking local shipping. The player's task is to fly in and completely destroy the rogue island.

== Reception ==
Reviews are generally negative, citing a slow running speed, an overly high difficulty level and a lack of originality. Reviewers independently agree that the game has a major flaw in that the enemy bullets are incredibly difficult to see, being the same colour as the background graphics in many versions. The game has also been criticised for having a weak aeroplane theme as it is simply a fixed-speed vertical scroller which could just as easily have a spaceship or any such sprite in its place.

The game scored 24% in Crash magazine.
