= Roller Coaster Rumbler =

1989 video game

- The Amiga boxart of Roller Coaster Rumbler
- Developer: Subway Software
- Publisher: Tynesoft
- Programmer: Gary James Gray (Atari ST)
- Artist: Philip Nixon (Atari ST)
- Composer: RMS Special (Atari ST)
- Platforms: Amiga, Atari ST, Commodore 64, MS-DOS
- Release: 1989
- Genre: Rail shooter

Roller Coaster Rumbler is a rail shooter video game. It was designed by Subway Software (Arnie Katz, Bill Kunkel and Joyce Worley) for British publisher Tynesoft, which published it in 1989. Versions appeared on MS-DOS, Amiga, Atari ST and Commodore 64 with quality varying greatly among them.

In this first-person game, the player sits in the front seat of a roller coaster armed with a mounted machine gun and fires at pop-up targets which are released during the course of the ride.

== Reviews ==
Roller Coaster Rumbler received mixed reviews shortly upon release. ST Action, an English Atari ST-focused magazine rated it a 63%, stating it was "a cleaver demo", and called gameplay "bland" and "unchanging". Amiga-Spel, a Swedish Amiga-focused magazine, was more positive to the game, saying that "Roller Coaster Rumbler is proof that there are still game producers with imagination and innovation" and "a very pointless pointless game but oh so fun!". Amiga-Spel ended on an overall 8/10, with an 8/10 in the graphics category, a 7/10 for sound design, and an 8/10 for replay value.
