= Indoor Sports =

1987 video game

- Developer: SportTime (DesignStar Consultants)
- Publishers: Mindscape (US); Databyte (EU); Advance (EU); Tynesoft (EU)
- Platforms: Acorn Electron, Amiga, Amstrad CPC, Apple II, Atari ST, BBC Micro, Commodore 64, C16 / Plus/4, MS-DOS, ZX Spectrum
- Release: 1987
- Genre: Sports

Indoor Sports is a sports video game developed by DesignStar's SportTime and first published in the U.S. by Mindscape in 1987 for the Commodore 64. Indoor Sports includes simulations of bowling, darts, ping-pong, and air hockey. It was converted to the Acorn Electron, Amiga, Amstrad CPC, Apple II, Atari ST, BBC Micro, MS-DOS, and ZX Spectrum. Versions for the Commodore 16 and Plus/4 omit Air Hockey. In Europe it was published by Databyte, Advance Software, and Tynesoft, depending on the platform.

== Gameplay ==
Indoor Sports allows players to play simulations of bowling, darts, ping-pong, and air hockey. The Commodore 16 and Plus/4 version only has the first 3 events.

== Reception ==
Info gave the Commodore 64 version of Indoor Sports four stars out of five, describing it as "an unusual and mixed bag". Approving of all four games' graphics and gameplay, the magazine concluded that "it's unusual titles like this that keep us fascinated with computer gaming year after year!" Computer Gaming World called the bowling game "quite difficult and badly executed" but said that the other games were much better, with darts being the best. The game was reviewed in 1988 in Dragon #133 by Hartley, Patricia, and Kirk Lesser in "The Role of Computers" column. The reviewers gave the game 2 out of 5 stars.
