= Classic Snooker =

1987 video game

Championship 3D Snooker
- Developer(s): Anco Software
- Publisher(s): Anco Software
- Platform(s): Commodore 64, Commodore 16
- Release: EU: 1987
- Genre(s): Sports simulation – snooker
- Mode(s): Single-player, multiplayer

Classic Snooker (also known as Tournament Snooker) is a sports simulation video game developed and published by Anco Software in 1987. Classic Snooker simulates the cue sport snooker, and was released for the Commodore 16 and Commodore 64.

== Overview ==
Classic Snooker is played on a traditional snooker table, with the ability to play against the AI, or against an opponent.

== Reception ==
Reception

Review scores
Publication	Score
Computer Gamer	84%
Zzap! 64	51%
Aktueller Software Markt	62%

The game received mixed reviews from critics. Computer Gamer magazine scored the game at 84%, and were positive about the game's mechanics, despite bugs, saying "The action does slow down if more than three balls are moving but this is acceptable as the whole thing is flicker free and as a bonus loads in only a few seconds." German gaming review magazine Aktueller Software Markt (ASM) scored the game at 62% saying "The game itself is quite entertaining and realistic. The running of the balls on the table, the effect, the change of direction after the billiards and the playing of the games were pretty well done."

ASM were however, less positive about the game's presentation, saying "A major disadvantage of the program is that it is extremely difficult to distinguish the colors of the balls from each other. So it is hardly possible to recognize the pink, brown and red balls as well as the yellow and the white ball." ASM were pleased with the graphics despite this, saying "Of course, the mentioned drawback spoils the fun, but this disadvantage is offset by the quite realistic presentation." Zzap!64 reviewed the game, commenting on how the poorly the game ran on the Commodore 16 system, saying that the game "plays okay, but the screen tends to flicker quite violently at times and can prove most off-putting."
