= Delta 16 =

1985 video game

- Developer(s): Jyri Lehtonen
- Publisher(s): Amersoft
- Platform(s): Commodore 16, Commodore 64
- Release: 1985
- Genre(s): Fixed shooter
- Mode(s): Single-player

Delta 16 is a fixed shooter video game from Finnish developer Jyri Lehtonen published by Amersoft in 1985. It was originally released for the Commodore 16 home computer, then ported to Commodore 64 for which it was released free of charge. A total of 101 copies were sold. The game includes an automated firing mechanism that the player can activate.

The game was programmed with a limited selection of CBM-Basic commands and then compiled (with C64) into pure machine code using a basic compiler also made by Jyri Lehtonen.
