= Booty (video game) =

1984 video game

- Developers: John F. Cain (Spectrum); Kevin Moughtin (C64/C16); Paul Johnston/Melvyn Wright (CPC)
- Publisher: Firebird
- Platforms: Amstrad CPC, Commodore 64, Commodore 16, ZX Spectrum
- Release: 1984
- Genre: Platform
- Mode: Single-player

Booty is a platform game published in 1984 for the Commodore 64 and ZX Spectrum. The game was one of Firebird's initial releases. It was later released for the Amstrad CPC and Commodore 16.

== Development ==
Booty was initially developed as a three part game for Rabbit Software under the title Jolly Roger, but the company was put into voluntary liquidation after the suicide of joint founder Alan Savage following a car crash. With only the first two parts completed a deal was made to publish the game with Firebird but they were only interested in the second part of the game.

John Cain was unable to completely remove the first part of the game from the Spectrum version and simply made it inaccessible, but it was later discovered that it could still be played if the user had a Currah Microspeech connected. The hidden level, where a diver has to swim underneath the pirate ship collecting fish, can also forced without a Microspeech by poking specific memory locations.

== Gameplay ==
The player takes on the role of a cabin boy who attempts to steal a hoard of treasure from his pirate masters. A variety of hazards must be avoided including pirates, parrots and booby-trapped treasure. Should the player manage to collect all the treasure, he is given 45 seconds to find a final key, which will restart the game.

There are a total of 20 screens in the game which contain a mixture of collectable treasure, doors to other screens, and doors which act as obstacles and can only be unlocked by collecting the appropriate numbered key. Some rooms contain non-player character pirates, contact with which will cause the loss of one of the player's three lives.

== Reception ==
Reception

Award
Publication	Award
Crash	Smash!

The game was positively reviewed by Crash, which awarded it a "smash" rating of 93%. The main features the magazine cited were the novelty of the setting, and the bold graphics. Also noted was that the complexity of the problem-solving aspect of the game was not initially apparent, and that it was more of a challenge than it first appeared. The Your Spectrum review was less positive, with scores of between two and three stars out of five for its three reviewers, although two of them commented that the game was "very good value for money".

The Spectrum and Commodore 64 versions both entered the Boots machine-specific charts at number one at the same time in late 1984. Following a second week at number one, they were replaced at the top of the charts by Ghostbusters on the Commodore and Daley Thompson's Decathlon on the Spectrum.

In 1985, the authors of the game were presented with a Gold Cassette Award by Home Computing Magazine for sales of over 100,000 copies. Crash magazine reported that Football Manager had also recently passed the same milestone but had taken three years to do so.
