= Hercules (1984 video game) =

- Powerhouse BBC re-release cover
- Publishers: Interdisc; Alpha Omega; The Power House
- Designer: Steve Bak
- Programmers: Commodore 64; Steve Bak; ZX Spectrum; John White; Ayyaz Mahmood; C16, Plus/4; Wayne Alan Maw; BBC, Electron; Gary Tomlinson
- Platforms: Commodore 64, Commodore 16, Plus/4, Acorn Electron, BBC Micro, ZX Spectrum
- Release: 1984
- Genre: Platform

Yolanda
- Developer: Vectordean
- Publisher: Millenium
- Designer: Steve Bak
- Programmer: Chris Sorrell
- Artist: Leavon Archer
- Composer: Phil Bak
- Platforms: Atari ST, Amiga
- Release: August 1990
- Genre: Platform

Hercules is a platform video game written by Steve Bak for the Commodore 64 and published by Interdisc in 1984. It was reissued in 1986 by Alpha Omega and ported to the Acorn Electron, BBC Micro, Commodore 16, Plus/4, and ZX Spectrum. Alpha Omega changed its name to The Power House shortly after publishing the game.

It was later remade in 1990 as Yolanda for the Amiga and Atari ST, with updated graphics and a different main character Yolanda, the daughter of Hercules.

== Gameplay ==
Lion of Nemean labour (C64)

As Hercules, the player must complete the Twelve Deathly Labours of Hercules. The player traverses from each screen's starting point to its goal by jumping between platforms, moving along them, and climbing ropes. The platforms are not as they seem when the level begins. Some turn to fire when walked on (killing the player) and others cannot be seen until walked on.

The game can begin with any one of eleven of the twelve labours (the twelfth is always kept until the end) and then every time the player dies or completes a labour, a different random labour begins. There are fifty screens in total.

== Release ==
The original Commodore 64 version was first released in 1984 by Interdisc. Although it received good reviews, the publisher was short-lived, and the game was not widely promoted. It was later picked up by Alpha Omega (part of the CRL Group) and reissued in 1986 (at the £4.99 price point) when it was reviewed more widely. In late 1986, Alpha Omega became The Power House selling the game at the budget price point of £1.99. The game was ported and released by The Power House for the ZX Spectrum in 1986 and the Acorn Electron, BBC Micro, and Commodore 16/Plus/4 in 1987. The Power House release includes an audio track by H.E.X. on the cassette after the game data.

== Reception ==
Personal Computer Games reviewed the Commodore 64 version on original release. They particularly praised the fact the game restarts with a random task and the hidden and disappearing platforms which made playing the game "...very dicy - and very exciting". They concluded "Hercules is a game that requires perseverance and patience to get started, but it's well worth the effort" giving an overall score of 8/10.

Zzap!64 also gave a positive review of the C64 version on reissue in 1986. Despite criticising the graphics and sound, the game was praised praise for being tricky, fast paced and addictive. The review concluded: "Don't judge a book by its cover–beneath the awful exterior lies a superb platform game" and awarded a score of 92%.

Reviews of the Spectrum port were at best mixed, with the poor graphics and sound called-out. Your Sinclair awarded the game 3/10 with the author claiming he gave up in frustration. Sinclair User found the game similarly "unfair" with "unspeakably bad" graphics but said it had some "neat twists" awarding an overall score of 2/5. ZX Computing was more positive, giving a rating of "good". Although acknowledging the "dreadful" presentation and "unplayable" key sequence, the reviewer claimed the game "proves the point that you don't have to have great graphics for it to be addictive".

The Yolanda remake for Atari ST and Amiga was developed by Vectordean and published by Millenium, released in August 1990. The One magazine gave the Atari ST version a positive review and score of 88%, though ST Format gave it a more pessimistic 58%. The Amiga version was given a 49% score in its review by Amiga Format..
