= Big Mac (video game) =

1985 video game

Big Mac: The Mad Maintenance Man
- European cover art
- Publishers: NA: Mastertronic; EU: Mastertronic
- Designer: Tony Kelly
- Composer: Tony Kelly
- Platform: Commodore 64 / 16
- Release: NA: 1985; EU: 1985
- Genre: Platform
- Mode: Single-player

Big Mac: The Mad Maintenance Man (shown on the box cover as More Adventures of Big Mac: The Mad Maintenance Man and often abbreviated Big Mac) is a video game published in 1985 by Mastertronic for the Commodore 64. It is a platform game in the style of Manic Miner.

The player takes on the role of the title character who must negotiate a power station consisting of 18 separate levels (vaults). On each level the aim is to avoid a range of defences and press switches to shut down the vault.

== Reception ==
The game received a 79% rating from Zzap!64. They found the graphics somewhat basic, though nicely animated. The music was complimented and overall the game was considered to be good value for money.

== Legacy ==
The game was hacked by Gábor Herczeg and re-released as a freeware "sequel" under the name Big Mac II. This game was in fact the same as the original but with extra levels.
