= Winter Olympics (1986 video game) =

1986 video game

- Publisher: Tynesoft
- Platforms: Atari 8-bit, Commodore 16, Plus/4, MSX
- Release: EU: 1986
- Genre: Sports
- Mode: Single-player

Winter Olympics is a sports video game published in 1986 by Tynesoft for the Atari 8-bit computers, Commodore 16, Plus/4, and MSX.

== Gameplay ==
The game features six events: speed skating, ski jump, bobsleigh, alpine skiing (slalom and downhill), and curling (not available in the Atari version).

== Reception ==
Reception

Review scores
Publication	Score
Aktueller Software Markt	1/12 (Atari)
Computer and Video Games	8/10 (C16)
Zzap!64	55% (C16)
Commodore User	1/5 (C16)
MSX Extra	6/10 (MSX)

Commodore User called the game "hugely disappointing" and said the ski slalom event was the only one with any excitement in it. Computer and Video Games praised the graphics as stunning and called it one of the best games for the C16/Plus/4 yet. Italian Zzap! liked the graphics but didn't like the imprecise controls. Aktueller Software Markt said the cover art is the highlight of the program and summarized that it would have been a decent game if it had used the full graphical capabilities of Atari 800. MSX Extra called the game outdated in terms of graphics, sound, and motion.
