= Joe Blade 2 =

1988 video game

- Developer: Colin Swinbourne
- Publisher: Players
- Platforms: ZX Spectrum, Commodore 16, Commodore 64, Amstrad CPC, Amiga, Atari ST, Acorn Electron, BBC Micro, Atari 8-bit
- Release: 21 Sept 1988 (Amstrad/C64/Spectrum), October 1988 (Amiga/Atari ST)
- Genre: Platform
- Mode: Single-player

Joe Blade 2 is the second game in the Joe Blade series.

== Gameplay ==
Joe encounters a trenchcoated citizen and a punk (ZX Spectrum)

Joe Blade 2 took a rather different approach to the first game. Instead of being a soldier, Blade was this time a vigilante taking to the city to rid the streets of criminals, rescuing old-age pensioners along the way. Blade was no longer armed with a gun, and had to jump over villains, just touching them with his feet, to dispatch them. In order for the civilians to be successfully rescued, the protagonist was given a simple puzzle (called a sub-game level) of organizing the pattern of symbols. There were four types of these sub-games and all of them needed to be completed within 60 seconds. This almost surreal take on the game was in stark contrast to the comparatively more gritty realism of the first installment. The game was also known for being considerably easier than the first title, almost to the point where many players managed to complete the game in one hour-long sitting.

The Spectrum version of the game included an Invade-a-Load-style loader by Andy Severn called Loada-Game featuring a playable version Pac-Man.

== Reception ==
Reception

Award
Publication	Award
Crash	Crash Smash

Paul Rixon for New Atari User said: "I did find the original Joe Blade more instantly playable, but this is probably due to the lack of instructions supplied with my preview copy of the sequel [...] I'd advise all arcade adventuring types, especially fans of the original game, to grab a copy without hesitation!"

Crash said: "short term Joe Blade II is playable, which wins much of my vote."

Reviewing the Atari ST version, Computer and Video Games said: "If you enjoyed the Joe Blade and you are looking for more of the same, get your hands on this toute-de-suite."

Richard Henderson for Computer Gamesweek said: "Admittedly the graphics are good, but there is no real variety between screens and the sprites move far too slowly to make it fun."

Sinclair User said: "Joe Blade II is a bit like watching a ballet: it's all very pretty and artistic, but you soon end up wishing someone would cut loose with a machine-gun."
