= Commodore 16 =

Home computer

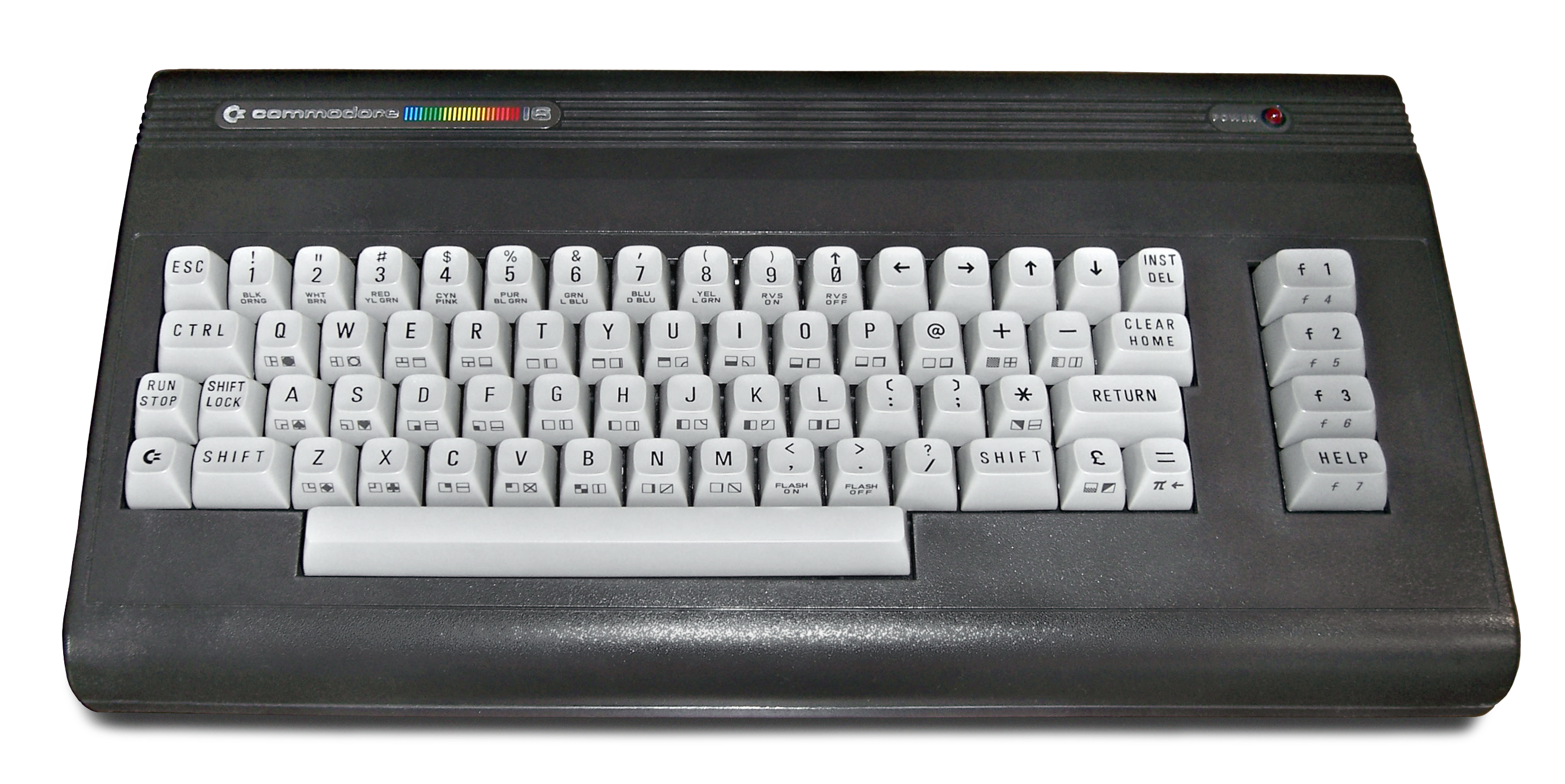
- Commodore 16
- Manufacturer: Commodore Business Machines
- Product family: Commodore 264 series
- Type: Home computer
- Released: 1984; 42 years ago
- Introductory price: US$99 (equivalent to $310 in 2025)
- Discontinued: 1985; 41 years ago
- Units shipped: 1,266,000 (worldwide)
- Media: ROM cartridge, Compact Cassette
- Operating system: Commodore KERNAL/BASIC 3.5
- CPU: MOS Technology 7501 or 8501 @ 0.89/1.76 MHz (avg. approx. 1.1 MHz)
- Memory: 16 KB RAM + 32 KB ROM
- Display: 320×200, 320×160 (with 5 lines of text), 160×200, 160×160 (with 5 lines of text)
- Graphics: TED (320 × 200, 121 colors)
- Sound: TED (2 channels, 4 octaves + white noise)
- Input: Keyboard (66 keys, 4 function keys, 4 cursor keys), joystick
- Dimensions: 40.7 cm × 20.4 cm × 7.7 cm (16.0 in × 8.0 in × 3.0 in)
- Related: Commodore Plus/4

Commodore 116
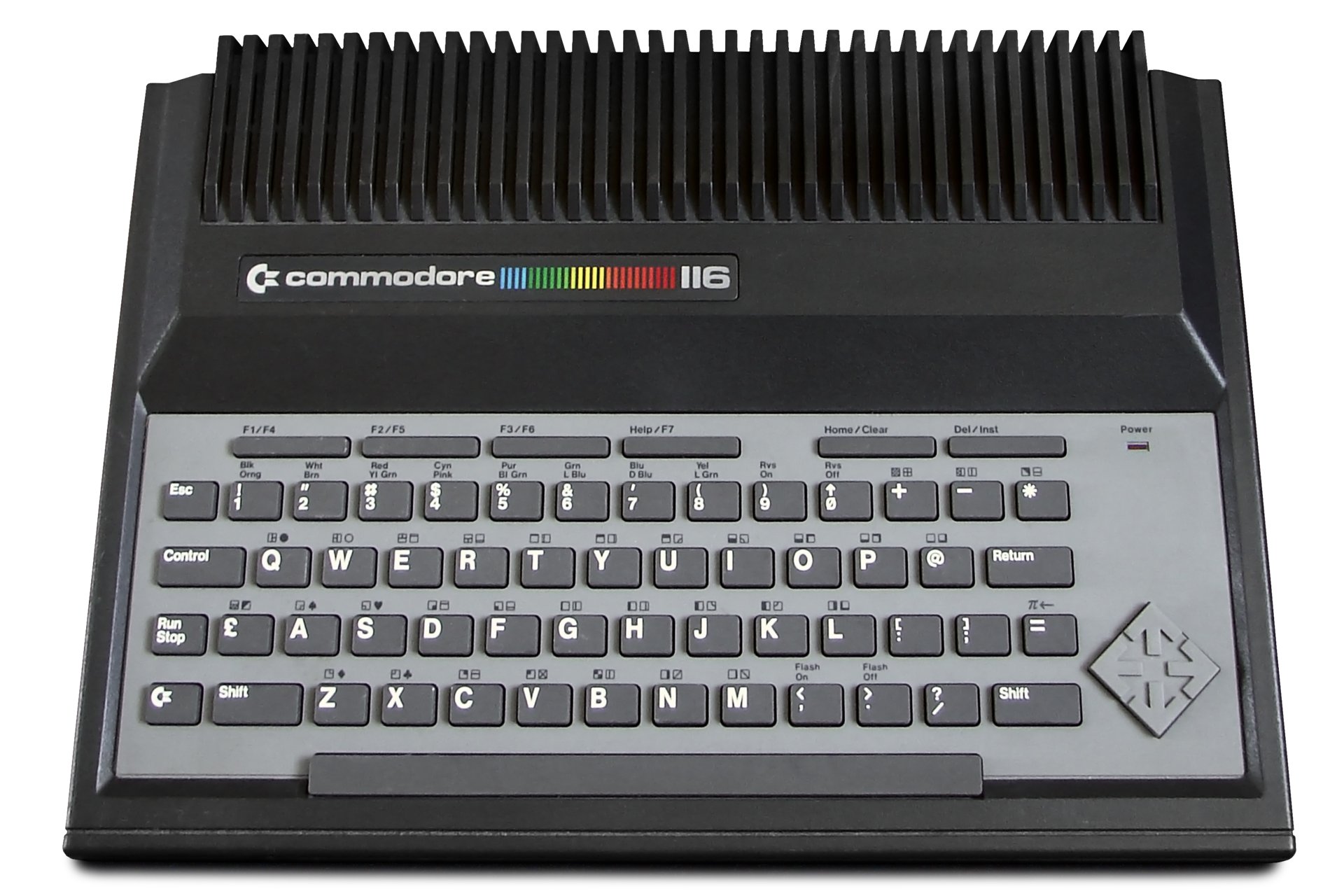
- Type: Home computer
- Input: Keyboard

Original Commodore 16 box

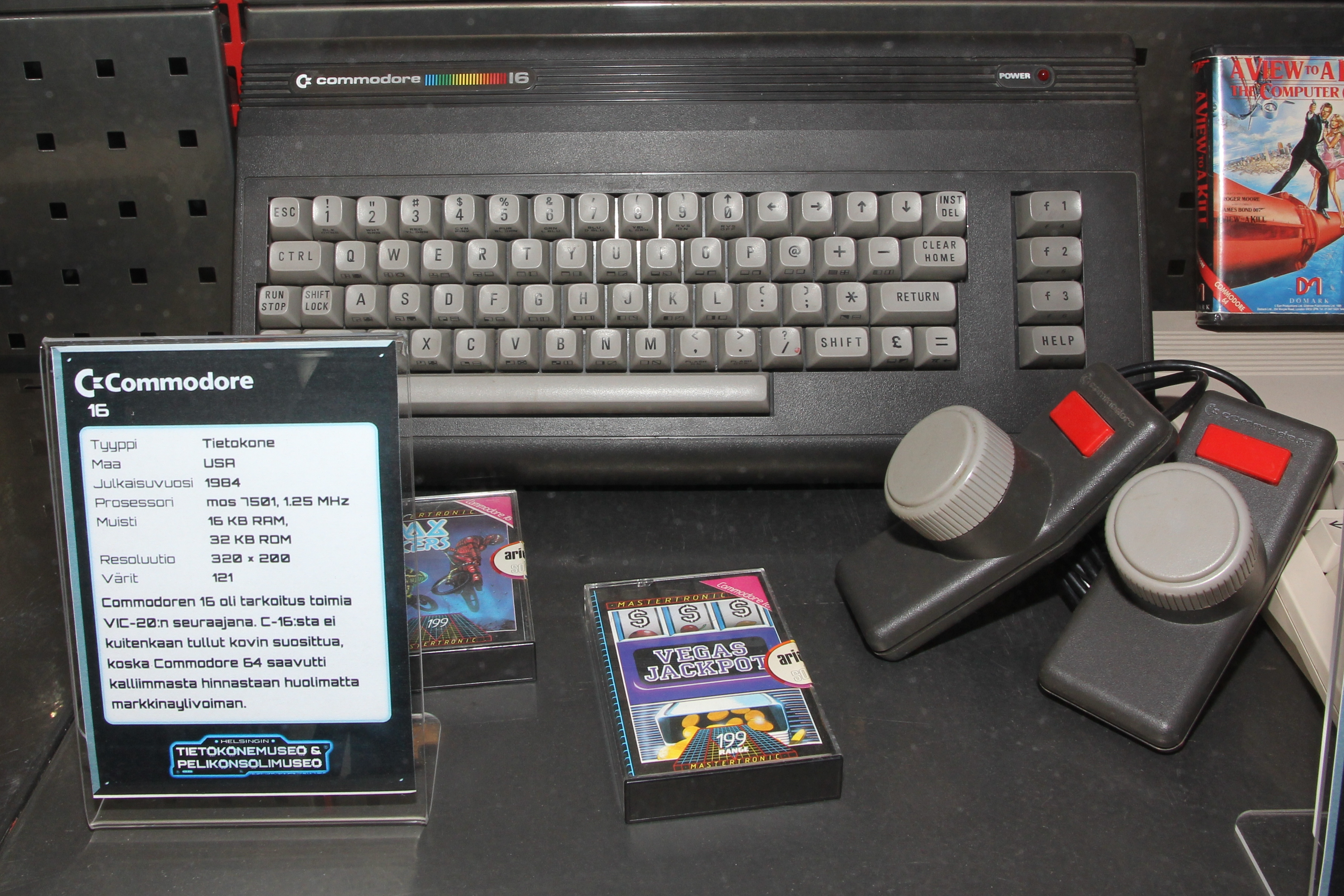
A Commodore 16 in the Tietokonemuseo retro systems museum

The Commodore 16 is a home computer made by Commodore International with a 6502-compatible 7501 or 8501 CPU, released in 1984 and intended to be an entry-level computer to replace the VIC-20. A cost-reduced version, the Commodore 116, was mostly sold in Europe.

The C16 and C116 belong to the same family as the higher-end Plus/4 and are internally very similar to it (albeit with less RAM – 16 KB rather than 64 KB – and lacking the Plus/4's user port and Three-Plus-One software). Software is generally compatible among all three provided it can fit within the C16's smaller RAM and does not utilize the user port on the Plus/4.

While the C16 was a failure on the US market, it enjoyed some success in certain European countries and Mexico.

== Intention ==
The C16 was intended to compete with other sub-$100 computers from Timex Corporation, Mattel, and Texas Instruments (TI). Timex's and Mattel's computers were less expensive than the VIC-20, and although the VIC-20 offered better expandability, a full-travel keyboard, and in some cases more memory, the C16 offered a chance to improve upon those advantages. The TI-99/4A was priced in-between Commodore's VIC-20 and Commodore 64, and is somewhat between them in capability, but TI was lowering its prices. On paper, the C16 was a closer match for the TI-99/4A than the aging VIC-20.

Commodore president Jack Tramiel feared that one or more Japanese companies would introduce a consumer-oriented computer and undercut everyone's prices. Although Japanese companies would soon dominate the U.S. video game console market, their feared dominance of the home computer field never materialized. Additionally, Timex, Mattel, and TI departed the computer market before the C16 was released.

== Description ==
Outwardly the C16 resembles the VIC-20 and the Commodore 64, but with a dark-gray or dark-brown case and light-gray keys. The keyboard layout differs slightly from the earlier models, adding an escape key and four cursor keys replacing the shifted-key arrangement the C64 and VIC-20 inherited from the PET series. The C16 is in some respects faster than the Commodore 64 and VIC-20; the processor runs at a speed roughly 75% faster, and the BASIC interpreter contains dedicated graphics commands, making drawing images considerably faster.

The system was designed around the TED chip which included NTSC and PAL video, sound and DRAM refresh functionality. Though according to the designer it "was supposed to be as close to a single-chip computer as we could get in the 1980s," the CPU, RAM, ROM and some glue logic were still on their own separate chips. (This was considerably less integrated than microcontrollers of the day, but those did not generally offer video and sound functionality.)

The C16 has 16 KB of RAM with 12 KB available to its built-in BASIC interpreter. The TED chip offered a palette of 121 colors, which was considerably more than the 16 colors available on the Commodore 64's VIC-II video chip, but it lacked the VIC-II's sprites and the sound capabilities were not as advanced as the SID also used in the Commodore 64.

From a practical user's point of view, three tangible features the C16 lacks are a modem port, a VIC-20/C64-compatible Datasette and game ports. Commodore sold a C16-family-specific Datassette (the Commodore 1531) and joysticks, but the pins are identical to those used on the Commodore 64, so it can be used with a simple adapter, in fact Commodore themselves sold Commodore 16 models with C2N datasettes designed for the Commodore 64 with adapters after the initial production run. The reason for changing the joystick ports was to reduce size. The C16's serial port (Commodore's proprietary "serial CBM-488 bus", was a variation of the Commodore PET IEEE interface as used on the VIC-20 and Commodore 64, which meant that printers and disk drives were interchangeable with the older machines. As it was a serial interface, modems could be connected with a suitable interface. Partially for cost reasons, the user port, designed for modems and other devices, was omitted from the C16 (although the connections for it were still present on the system board). Despite costing less than the Plus/4, the C16's keyboard was higher quality and easier to type on.

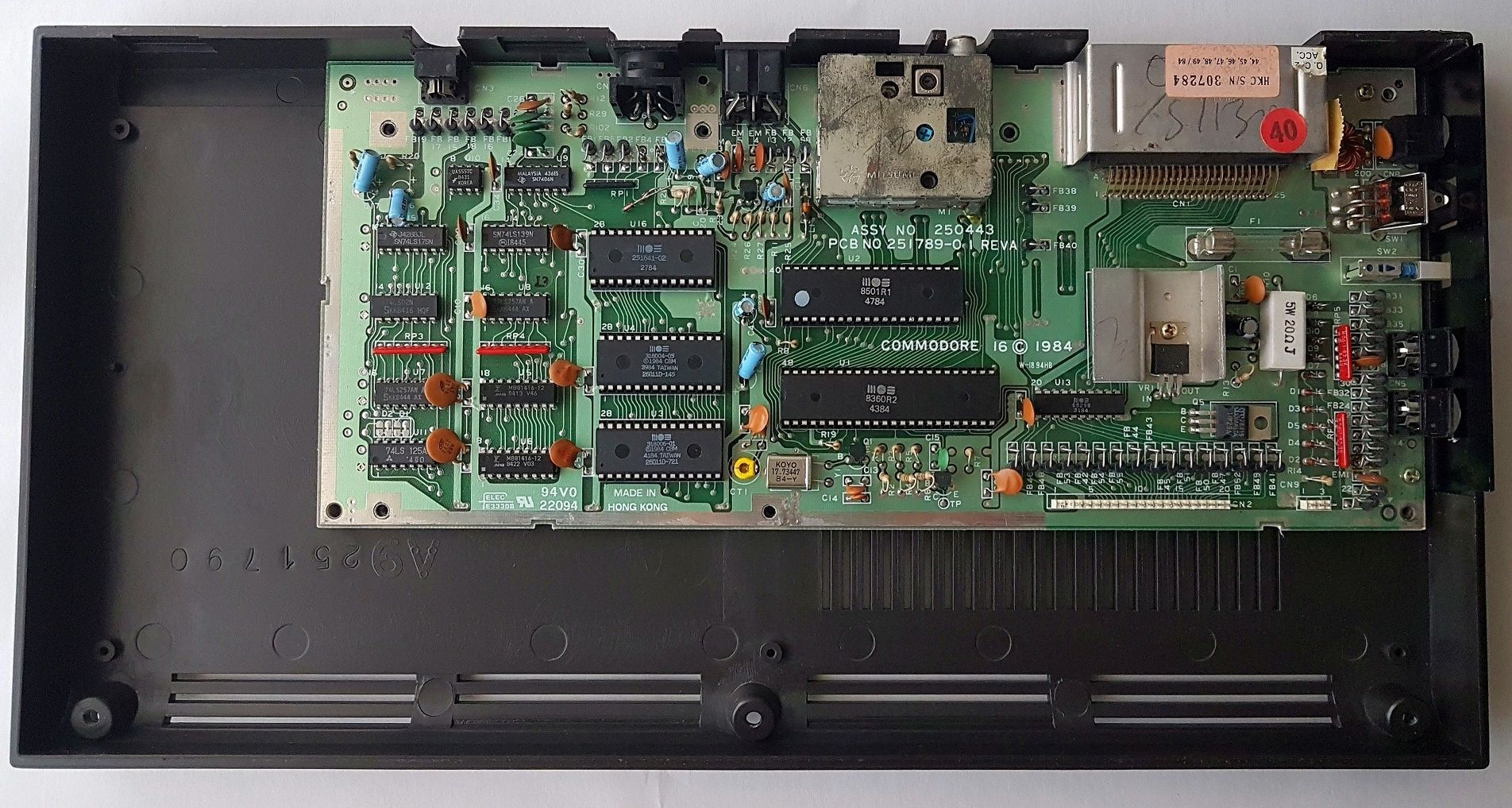
Commodore 16 main PCB, standard version

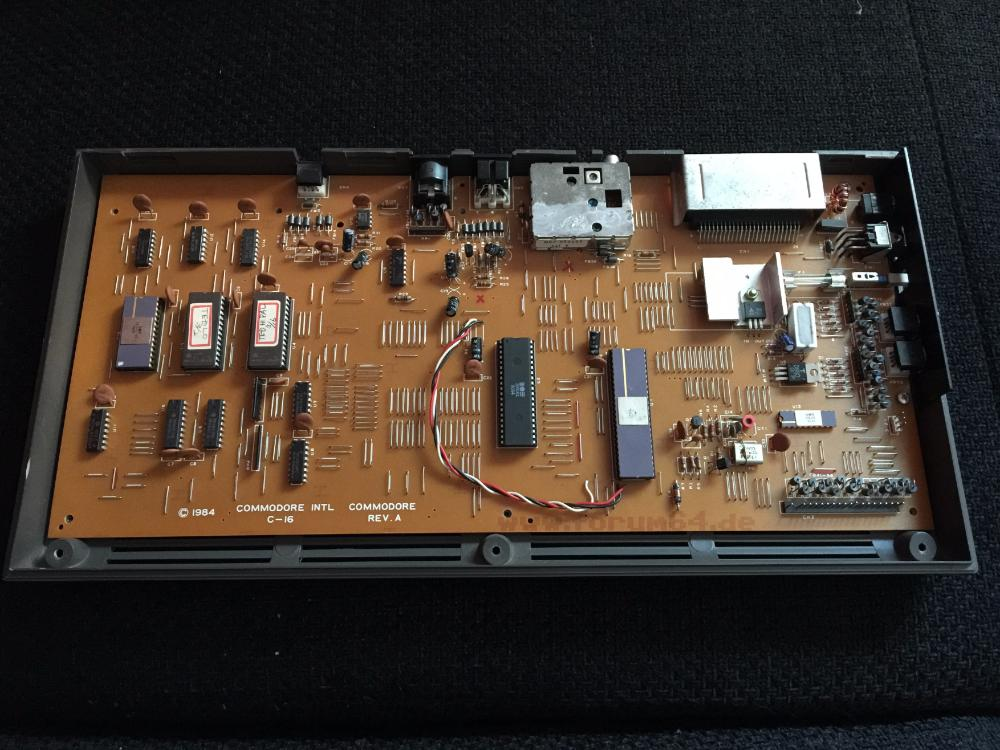
Early Commodore 16 single layer PCB (prototype), not used in regular series model

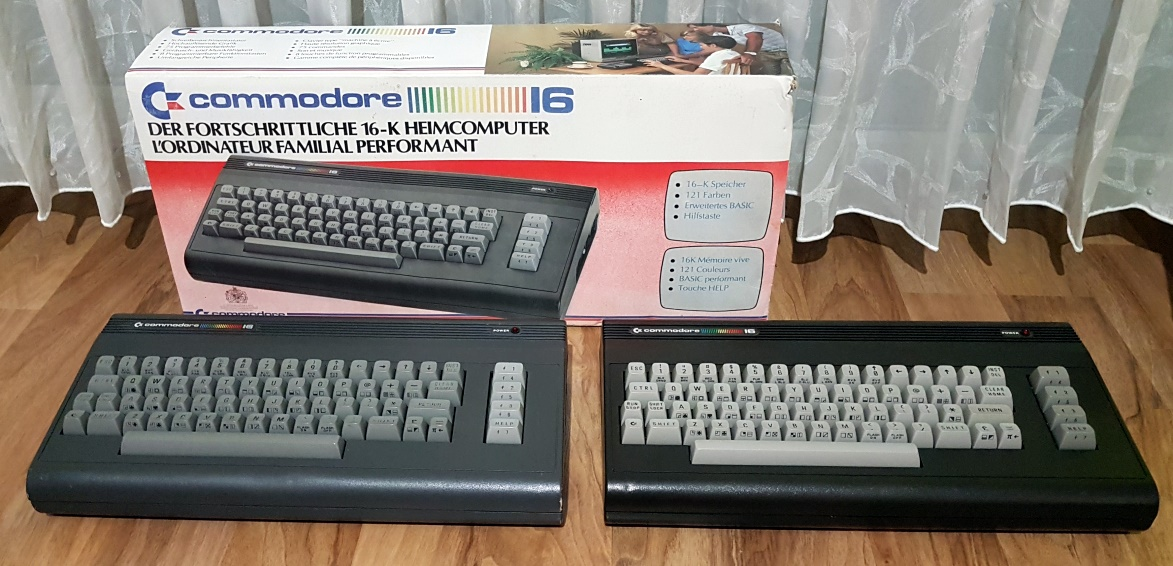
European box, Commodore 16 prototype (bottom left) and a regular series model with black case

The Commodore 16 is one of three computers in its family. The even-less-successful Commodore 116 is functionally and technically similar but was shipped in a smaller case with a rubber chiclet keyboard and was only available in Europe. The family's flagship, the Commodore Plus/4, was shipped in a similar case but has a 59-key full-travel keyboard (with a specifically advertised "cursor key diamond" of four keys, contrasted with the VIC-20's and C64's two + shift key scheme inherited from the PET), 64 KB of RAM, a modem port, and built-in entry-level office suite software. Although shipped with 16K from the factory, it was possible to modify the C16 for 64K, making it able to run any Plus/4 software except applications that required the user port or built-in programs.

The C16 had a memory expansion port, labelled as a cartridge port on the machine, but referred to as a memory/cartridge port in the manual. Commodore never sold a memory expansion for the C16, but they were available from third-party developers. With 64 KB, the C16 is identical to the Plus/4, except for the built in software of the Plus/4.

Hardware designer Bil Herd notes that the C116 is the original member of this family of computers and is the original vision as imparted by Jack Tramiel to the engineering department. It was designed to sell for $49 to $79. The C16 and the Plus/4 came later and were mostly driven by the company trying to figure out what to do with the new computer family after Tramiel's departure from Commodore.

In an early stage of development of the C16, Commodore was planning to have single-layer PCBs built in as an attempt of cost reducing, with the manufacturing cost of such a PCB being around $12. But these plans were later discarded possibly due to technical problems. It was the first and only attempt of Commodore using single-layer PCBs inside their computers, and only one such PCB is known to be preserved.

== Market performance ==
The C16 was a major failure in the U.S. and was discontinued within a year, but it sold reasonably well in Europe as a low-end game machine (over 90% of all C16 software was produced by European developers) and in Mexico as well.

The C16's failure in the US market was likely due to a lack of software support, incompatibility with the C64, and lack of importance to Commodore after its competitors withdrew from the market.

A total of 1 million Plus/4s, C16s, and C116s were sold, with the latter two accounting for about 60% of its total volume.

Beginning in 1986, remaining C16, C116 and Plus/4 inventories were sold at a much-reduced price on the Eastern Bloc market, chiefly Hungary. Hungary did not produce any home computers at the time, the Soviet and Bulgarian models were far too expensive for most Hungarians while the East German models were not for sale to private parties, and most Western models were completely unavailable. Thus, this move by Commodore was the first chance for many people in Hungary to own a computer at all. It created a fanbase that lasted well into the 1990s and that contributed several unofficial ports of popular Commodore 64 programs.

=== Mexico ===
In Mexico, the C16 was sold as a beginner's computer from early 1985 to 1992. Aurrerá supermarkets distributed them with Grupo Sigma S.A., a local distributor of Commodore USA. The computer was marketed as "Sigma-Commodore 16" (all other Commodore computers sold in Mexico had the same moniker). Basically, this model is the same as the American/European C16; as it doesn't have the "Ñ" key needed for writing the Spanish language, the only difference is the custom label.

Aurrera Supermarket also sold software, peripherals and books about to how to program Commodore Computers. All this merchandise was displayed in special modules at the electronics department called "El Universo de la Computación" (The Universe of the Computer Science). The success of Commodore in Mexico was in granted by the fact that Aurrera Supermarket let anyone test the machines in store, so people gathered to play games and exchange programs in unofficial computer clubs.

At least four annual software writing contests were held sponsored by Aurrera Supermarket, Grupo Sigma and Commodore between 1985 and 1989. These contests had entries for programming, custom hardware and computer graphics for the C16, C64, C128 and Amiga. Prizes included money, Commodore software and hardware and the right to have the software published by Grupo Sigma for the local market. The contest winners had limited sales restricted only to Mexico, so the resulting original software is almost impossible to find.

Grupo Sigma stopped supporting the brand in mid-1993, in favor of the growing (and more profitable) IBM PC compatible market.

== Video ==
15 colors in 8 luminance, giving 120 shades of color levels plus black.

- High resolution:
  - 320 × 200 in 2 colors per 8 × 8 pixel block.
  - No color restriction per screen.
- Multicolor
  - 160 × 200 in 4 colors per block.
  - No color restrictions.
- Text
  - 40 × 25 text in 8×8 pixels.
- Sprites
  - No hardware sprites

== See also ==
- List of Commodore 16 games
- C16 games
- PETSCII character set
