= Intellectual property protection of video games =

The protection of intellectual property (IP) of video games through copyright, patents, and trademarks, shares similar issues with the copyrightability of software as a relatively new area of IP law. The video game industry itself is built on the nature of reusing game concepts from prior games to create new gameplay styles but bounded by illegally direct cloning of existing games, and has made defining intellectual property protections difficult since it is not a fixed medium.

== Overview ==
=== Game creation ===
Aspects of video game creation includes the use of multiple software, each of which may be copyrighted separately from others. Open source softwares can also be released under different licenses, and in some occasions, having individual components copyrighted separately. Some software cannot be copyrighted at all because of their existence in the public domain or Creative Commons.

==== Common assets ====
There is a plethora of websites which allow creators to 'borrow' assets to implement in-game. The model of granting access and permission to use these assets differs across websites and may range from an upfront payment to a portion of profits (if the assets are used commercially). This is not an issue with large video game publishers (such as EA, Activision, or Sony), but when these self-contained companies create large and detailed worlds, most of the assets they create end up being used only once. This limits the public pool of resources/assets. Assets will often have to be recreated in order to create a new game (or sequel by another company or creator), which is a common complaint of game developers, as it usually costs large amounts of money to create commercially viable assets and makes it difficult for smaller developers to produce games.

==== Game engines ====
A game engine is a framework or IDE which a developer can use to create games. They consist of a software suite with a multitude of components, such as a rendering engine, audio engine, physics engine, and non-player character systems. Some engines are free and open source. However, because of limitations or certain peculiarities of an engine, some designs or passive-background tasks may occur in a particular way for every game made using that engine. This particular feature (regardless of how central it may be to a game) is essentially the same in all games created with that engine, which takes it outside the scope of copyright. This reasoning would also apply to games made with the same engine which share source code—this would not constitute copying because the games' similarity is inherent to the tools. Large video game houses/publishers can sidestep this limitation by developing in-house engines.

==== Producers-developers relation ====
Classically, publishers had the role of securing (or providing) funding for a game, as well as bearing the losses and in many cases, marketing the game. These expenses were generally large and could run as high as tens of millions of dollars for AAA titles. But, with the advent of the Internet and the rise of indie culture, a new wave of financing and distribution technologies has emerged. Sites like Kickstarter and Indiegogo allow for interested consumers to directly contribute towards game development by purchasing the game in advance. Digital distributors like Steam and GOG.com removed the costly need for the manufacture and distribution of physical game discs. These innovations have allowed the industry to move away from the standard of intellectual property rights resting with the publisher instead of the developers, as "the IP rights that typically vested with publishers may now be shared with a publisher or owned by a developer or an investment vehicle".

==== Music creators, voice actors and other contributors ====
Contributions that do not add directly to the code of the game would not be protected by copyrights for literary works, but these components could be covered if an audiovisual copyright is taken out. As for authorship rights, most contributors are employees and hence their work would be considered "work for hire", belonging not to them, but to their employer. Music is generally not created in-house by game developers; since third parties are hired, this may not result in a work for hire. See U.S court case CCNV v. Reid, on the principle work for hire.

=== Gameplay ===
==== Hardware limitations ====
Some copyrightable elements of a game may be created due to hardware limitations. For example, the classic game Space Invaders, as originally played as an arcade game, got faster as the player killed more of the onscreen aliens, which freed up system resources.

==== User input ====
User input is an essential component of video games, which are interactive media. Though this may not change the intellectual property rights in the base code of the game, some developers/publishers may restrict the rights of players to broadcast their playthrough of the game. The arguments from the other side are that the output of a game is coming in a particular way due to user input and this can reasonably give a player some restricted rights in his/her play through, also known as a Let's Play.

== Copyright ==
Copyright is a protection of intellectual property that give exclusive right to the author(s) of a creative work. A video game may be protected as a creative work. Whether or not a work is copyrighted, and the duration of the copyright may differ between countries, and may also be limited by country specific exceptions, like the fair use doctrine in the United States.

=== International standard ===
The Berne Convention for the Protection of Literary and Artistic Works (The Berne Convention of 1886) is the international treaty which provides the scope for copyright protection of video games. This protection can be drawn from the wide definition of "Literary and Artistic Work" in Article 2 of the Convention, which reads:

The expression "literary and artistic works" shall include every production in the literary, scientific and artistic domain, whatever may be the mode or form of its expression, such as books, pamphlets and other writings; lectures, addresses, sermons and other works of the same nature; dramatic or dramatico-musical works; choreographic works and entertainments in dumb show; musical compositions with or without words; cinematographic works to which are assimilated works expressed by a process analogous to cinematography; works of drawing, painting, architecture, sculpture, engraving and lithography; photographic works to which are assimilated works expressed by a process analogous to photography; works of applied art; illustrations, maps, plans, sketches and three-dimensional works relative to geography, topography, architecture or science.

This standard treats the whole game as a singular component but does not define what would be covered by such a protection and what would be excluded. The World Intellectual Property Organization (WIPO) had recognized the complexity inherent in copyrighting video games, saying: "Although Article 2 of the Berne Convention provides a solid basis for eligibility for protection of video games by copyright, they are in fact complex works of authorship, potentially composed of multiple copyrighted works." WIPO has also stated in one of its reports that "there is no clear classification of video games and their protection will vary depending on each particular game and the elements that are part of it. In this sense, video games can be treated as computer programs and, thus, are classified as works of authorship; in that case, the source code for a video game is classified as a literary work. If pictorial or graphic authorship predominates, a video game may be classified as a visual arts work. Similarly, if motion picture or audiovisual authorship predominates, a video game may be classified as a motion picture/audiovisual work."

=== National standards ===
WIPO has written the following about copyright protection in different countries and jurisdictions: "For some countries, video games are predominantly computer programs, due to the specific nature of the works and their dependency on software. Whereas in other jurisdictions, the complexity of video games implies that they are given a distributive classification. Finally, few countries consider that video games are essentially audiovisual works."

==== United States ====
The Copyright Act of 1976, codified at 17 U.S.C. § 102 enumerates the requirements of a copyright in the US, but does not use the term. For a work to be copyrightable under the Copyright Act it must meet the threshold of originality, be fixed in a medium (whether analog or digital) and the work must be perceivable and reproducible. Regarding copyrights for video games, the US Copyright office has stated that "a single registration may be made for a computer program and its screen displays...(and) when answering the 'Type of work being registered' question on the application form, the copyright holder shall choose the type most appropriate to the predominant authorship."

In other words, US law does not specify a certain protection to be given to a game. The individual(s) registering the game, or their attorneys, must ascertain which category best protect the interests of the author/assignee.’

The Tetris Company won its case against Xio Interactive, on the basis that Xio's game Mino (right) copied too much of the look-and-feel of Tetris (left).

In the United States, the underlying source code, and the game's artistic elements, including art, music, and dialog, can be protected by copyright law. However, gameplay elements of a video game are generally ineligible for copyright; gameplay concepts fall into the idea–expression distinction that had been codified in the Copyright Act of 1976, in that copyright cannot be used to protect ideas, but only the expression of those ideas. The United States Copyright Office specifically notes: "Copyright does not protect the idea for a game, its name or title, or the method or methods for playing it. Nor does copyright protect any idea, system, method, device, or trademark material involved in developing, merchandising, or playing a game. Once a game has been made public, nothing in the copyright law prevents others from developing another game based on similar principles." Courts also consider scènes à faire (French for "scenes that must be done") for a particular genre as uncopyrightable; games involving vampires, for example, would be expected to have elements of the vampire drinking blood and driving a stake through the vampire's heart to kill him. It is generally recognized in the video game industry that borrowing mechanics from other games is common practice and often a boon for creating new games, and their widespread use would make them ineligible for legal copyright or patent protection.

The United States passed the Digital Millennium Copyright Act (DMCA) in 1998 as part of the WIPO Performances and Phonograms Treaty. Broadly, the DMCA prohibits hardware and software anti-circumvention tools, such as reading an encrypted optical disc. For both video game hardware manufacturers and for software developers and publishers, this helps to protect their work from being copied, disassembled, and reincorporated into a clone. However, the DMCA has been problematic for those in video game preservation that wish to store older games on more permanent and modern systems. As part of the DMCA, the Library of Congress adds various exemptions which have included the use of anti-circumvention for museum archival purposes, for example.

In present-day case law driven by decisions in the United States legal system, video game copyrights come from two forms. The first is by its source code or equivalent, as determined by the 1983 decision in Apple Computer, Inc. v. Franklin Computer Corp. that software code can be considered a "literary work" and thus subject to copyright protection. The second form is as an audiovisual work, as determined in the 1982 case Stern Electronics, Inc. v. Kaufman; while video games present images and sound that are not in a fixed form, the repetitive use of these in a systematic response to player's actions was sufficient for copyright protections as audiovisual works. In the case of the earlier hardware before programmable computer chips, copyright was also recognized by the impression of software based on the circuit board patterns and features that made games work as a form of fixation, as established by both Stern and the 1982 case Midway Mfg. Co. v. Dirkschneide, in which Midway successfully sued a company that was reselling repackaged versions of their arcade games Pac-Man, Galaxian and Rally-X.

Up until 2012, U.S. courts were reluctant to find for copyright infringement of clones. Driving case law in the United States was principally through the case Atari, Inc. v. Amusement World, Inc. (547 F. Supp. 222, 1982). Atari had sued Amusement World claiming that its video game Meteors violated their copyright on Asteroids. The court did find twenty-two similarities between the two games, but ruled against Atari's claims, citing these elements as scènes à faire for games about shooting at asteroids. The case established that "look and feel" of a game could not easily be protected. Attorney Stephen C. McArthur, writing for Gamasutra, said that during this period, courts opted to take a more lax view to balance innovation in the industry and prevent overzealous copyright protection that could have one company claim copyright on an entire genre of games. At best, copyright holders could challenge clones by threatening cease and desist letters, or on other intellectual property rights such as trademarks.

===== Shifts since 2012 =====
A shift in legal options for developers to challenge clones arose from the 2012 federal New Jersey district court decision in Tetris Holding, LLC v. Xio Interactive, Inc. that ruled in favor of The Tetris Company, the licensees of the Tetris copyright, over the clone Mino, developed by Xio Interactive, which used the same gameplay as Tetris but with different art assets. The developers for Mino has cited in their defense that they only used the uncopyrightable gameplay elements of Tetris in Mino. The court ruled that copyright law was in favor of the Tetris Company's claim, as the gameplay was copied without changes, and while the art assets were new, the "look and feel" of Mino could be easily confused for that of Tetris. The court also recognized that since the time Tetris had been released and when Mino was published, there was enough new technology in graphics that Mino could have added new forms of expression to the base gameplay to better distinguish from the idea of Tetris, such as how to display the tetraminos or the animation of how they fell, but instead copied very closely what Tetris had done, thus making it more likely a copyright violation. While only a district court decision and not binding outside of New Jersey, this served as case law for other developers to fend off "look-and-feel" clones.

The same reasoning was found in a similar case, Spry Fox, LLC v. Lolapps, Inc., that was occurring nearly simultaneously with the Tetris decision, in which Spry Fox, the developers of the mobile game Triple Town, successfully defended their game from a clone, Yeti Town, developed by 6Waves, through court settlement after the judge gave initially rulings in favor of Spry Fox. These rulings suggested that there was copyright protection on the gameplay mechanics despite drastic differences in the games' art assets, though other factors, such as prior agreements between Spry Fox and 6Waves, may have also been involved.

Both the Tetris and Triple Town cases have established new but limited case law on "look and feel" that can be used to challenge video game clones in court.

===== Idea/expression distinction =====
There is a long established Copyright principle called the idea–expression distinction, where Copyright is meant to protect a creator's unique expression, without giving anyone a monopoly on a broader idea. The US Copyright Office specifically states that “Copyright does not protect the idea for a game, its name or title, or the method or methods for playing it. Nor does copyright protect any idea, system, method, device, or trademark material involved in developing, merchandising, or playing a game.”

The idea-expression distinction is related to other Copyright principles and doctrines. One is the merger doctrine, where an idea can only be expressed in one way. The courts will not recognize Copyright protection in any expression that is inseparable from a larger idea, since it would effectively grant a monopoly over that idea. Another related concept is scènes à faire (French for "scenes to be made"), where certain generic elements are considered essential to a fictional setting, and should not eligible for Copyright protection. For example, the necessity of a baseball in a baseball game would be uncopyrightable as a scènes à faire.

Courts have applied the idea-expression distinction to numerous copyright disputes, starting with the 1981 case Atari v. Amusement World. Despite finding that Meteors copied the idea for Atari's Asteroids game, the court ruled that none of the similarities were protected by copyright, since these elements were “unavoidable” in making a game about “a spaceship combatting space rocks”. Atari v. Philips was another early ruling, where courts granted a preliminary injunction to stop sales of K.C. Munchkin! due to its similarities with Pac-Man. Later courts have ruled that many game elements cannot be protected by copyright. In both Data East USA, Inc. v. Epyx, Inc. and Capcom U.S.A. Inc. v. Data East Corp., the courts did not recognize copyright protection in many game mechanics and character designs that were seen as essential to creating a martial arts themed fighting game. In later cases such as Tetris Holding, LLC v. Xio Interactive, Inc. and Spry Fox, LLC v. Lolapps, Inc., courts have recognized copyright infringement where there is evidence that one game copied another's unique expression, more than just imitating the general idea.

===== Substantial similarity test =====
In Atari v. Philips (1982) the 7th Circuit wrote that "no plagiarist can excuse the wrong by showing how much of his work he did not pirate." This was said in the context of the fact that, "while a game is not protectable by copyright as such, this kind of work of authorship is protectable at least to a limited extent as long as the particular form in which it is expressed provides something new or additional over the idea" and that while two works may not be the same in many regards, if parts/components of the second work are wholly or substantially copied or like the first work, it is copyright infringement.

===== Subtractive approach test =====
Nichols v. Universal Pictures laid out the following test for copyrighted material which contains both copyrightable and public domain material. The case lays down 3 steps to be followed to ascertain copying:

1. The allegedly infringed work is analyzed to determine the parts that are protected,
2. The unprotected parts are subtracted, and
3. The fact finder examines significant similarities between what remains of the allegedly infringed work and the allegedly infringing work.

This subtractive approach is the preferred test by courts in the US (except for the 9th Circuit),

===== Abstraction-filtration-comparison test =====
This test, developed in Computer Associates International, Inc. v. Altai, Inc. (1992) was specifically aimed at software infringement and hence is a better fit for what a court is likely to apply with regards video games. The test, like the subtractive test before it, lays down three steps:

1. Abstraction – Ascertain each level of abstraction.
2. Filtration – Identify factors at each level that are not deserving of protection (ideas, processes, those dictated by efficiency or required for external compatibility, those taken from the public domain, etc.) and subtract them from consideration.
3. Comparison – Compare the remaining components for infringement.

The Abstraction-filtration-comparison test was notably used in identify copyright violations in video games in Tetris Holding, LLC v. Xio Interactive, Inc., which was used to find against a clone of Tetris due to substantial similarly in the broad look and feel of the game.

===== Authorship =====
In the U.S., corporations can be the author of an audiovisual work, which tends to be the most commonly used classification for a video game. In this case, the hiring corporation, rather than employees or other contributors, would be considered the author. Unlike European law, which has very strong "Moral Right Protections", moral rights in American law are limited to works of visual arts as defined by Section 101 of the U.S. Copyright Act (Act). This definition excludes "motion pictures or other audiovisual works" or any works made for hire.

There are developments in this field due to the advancement of technology as well. Services like 'Steam Workshop' allows for players to use tools provided by the game developer to add to the game in some manner. Usually, since these players are not employees, copyright of their works usually resides with them.

==== India ====
The Indian Copyright Act of 1975, does not address video games specifically. Unlike the US, India has not publicly listed under what categorization video game makers should seek protection under. India follows the Anglo-American tradition of allowing corporate persons to hold copyrights.

The Indian law has an exhaustive definition of the phrase "Artistic Work" under Chapter 1, Section 2(c) of the Copyrights Act, which states that Artistic Work is "(i) a painting, a sculpture, a drawing, an engraving or a photograph, whether or not any such work possesses artistic quality; (ii) a work of architecture; and (iii) any other work of artistic craftsmanship."

Due to the specificity of the statute, the law on video games in India has developed more on the basis of business practice. This has led to developers and publishers seeking protection as "cinematograph works". Under Section 2 of the act, a "cinematograph film" means "any work of visual recording on any medium produced through a process from which a moving image may be produced by any means and includes a sound recording accompanying such visual recording and cinematograph shall be construed as including any work produced by any process analogous to cinematography including video films." The phrase "process analogous to cinematography" has a non-exhaustive list attached, meaning that part of the definition is open-ended enough to allow for video games to be covered, but there is no jurisprudence on this issue.) The law in India does clearly state that a "literary work" includes computer programs and hence by extension, the source code of video games can be protected as software or literary work.

Unlike the US, in India, different aspects of a game, like the art, code, gameplay mechanics etc. are copyrightable independently. This understanding is furthered by Section 17 of the Indian Copyright Act which states that the person arranging for all components of a work to come together into a cohesive whole would be the one to hold the copyright in the work, only if all works are created under a contract of service as stated in Section 17 (c):

"In the case of a work made in the course of the author's employment under a contract of service or apprenticeship (...) the employer shall, in the absence of any agreement to the contrary, be the first owner of the copyright therein"

Under this rule, the authorship of creative contributions to a game that are made by individuals outside of the developers/publishers employment reside with the original creator, unless the rights are signed over to the developer.

Contributors like musicians and lyricists, having once consented to have their works in a cinematograph work, can no longer restrict or object to the enjoyment of the performer's rights by the producer but the original author/creator shall retain the right to receive royalties on public/commercial use of his/her work, as per Section 38 A (2) of the Indian Copyright Act. "It is unclear whether this new provision will affect video game authors due to the lack of qualification of this kind of work of authorship; this amendment to the Indian Copyright Act must, therefore, be further interpreted in this context...(it) must be interpreted by Indian courts in order to determine if it will apply to video game contributors and whether they shall have the right to receive royalties for the exploitation of their works."

The landmark case for deciding on infringement cases in India is R.G. Anand, which laid out the following test: if "the viewer after having read or seen both the works is clearly of the opinion and gets an unmistakable impression that the subsequent work appears to be a copy of the original" then the copyright has been infringed.

==== United Kingdom ====
Copyright law in the United Kingdom is set by the Copyright, Designs and Patents Act 1988, but this does not specifically account for video games under any of the works eligible for copyright. Instead, video games are considered protected by copyright in their parts. The computer code or other fixed medium is considered copyrightable, and the game's presentation can be copyrighted as a literary work or dramatic work, while elements like character design, art and sound and music can also be copyrighted. Other facets, like the look and feel or game mechanics, are not considered eligible for copyright.

==== European Union ====
The European Union (EU) as a body of member nations sets policies for copyright and other intellectual property protections that are then to be supported by laws passed at the national levels, allowing individual nations to include additional restrictions within the EU directives. Multiple EU directives have been issued related to copyright that affect video games, but at the core, the Computer Programs Directive of 1991 provide for copyright protection of video games in their source code and all its constituent parts in its fixed format, such as on an optical disc or printed circuit. The audio, visual and other creative elements of a game themselves are not directly covered by any EU directive, but have been enshrined in national laws as a result of the Berne Convention of which the EU and its member states are part of, with video games either expressly called out as cinematographic works or more broadly under audiovisual works. At least one case at the European Court of Justice has ruled similarly to the United States that ideas like gameplay concepts cannot be copyrighted but it is their form of expression that can merit copyrightability.

Patents on software and video games cannot be easily obtained in the European Union, unless it can be demonstrated that there is a significant technical effect beyond the interaction of the hardware and the software.

==== Japan ====
Japan's copyright laws are similar to the United States in that a form of artistic expression in a fixed medium is sufficient for copyright protection. Japan is also a member of the Berne convention. Video games, and computer code in general, are considered to fall under copyright as they are a "work of authorship" as "a production in which thoughts or emotions are expressed in a creative way and which falls in the literary, scientific, artistic or musical domain." Video games being eligible for copyrights in the same manner as cinematic works were established through three cases related to video game clones from 1982 to 1984, in which Japan's courted ruled, collectively, that the act of storing data into a computer's read-only memory (ROM) constitutes copying and thus unauthorized copies can be violations of copyright, that similarly hardware circuitry can carry software information and is also copyrightable, and that video games can contain artistic expression that is protected by copyright. These cases gave video games stronger protections for copyright than before, as Japan's courts typically put more onus on plaintiffs in copyright infringement cases to demonstrate similarity, and the fair use allowances tended to be more lax.

As part of the WIPO Performances and Phonograms Treaty, Japan amended its copyright laws in 1999 to prohibit hardware and software anti-circumvention devices, basing its language on the United States' own DMCA.

One issue that has affected the rerelease of older games in Japan are harsh copyright laws that would come into play if there was any possible dispute over possible copyright ownership. To republish a work, the publisher must have an agreement with the copyright owner, which for these older games may involve individuals that have died or moved to different fields and are difficult to track down. A new proposed law in 2021 would create a central repository for copyright management for such works across all media where the copyright owner is unclear and take responsibility for managing future rights issues. This would allow affected games to be republished without having to contact their original creators if they cannot be found.

==== China ====
China's legal framework to copyright does recognize individual elements video games as an eligible work for copyrightability with individual creative assets as being copyrightable, but does not have similar provisions as most other nations to recognize the fixed form of publication as also having copyright nor the work as a whole having copyright like a cinematographic work. These last elements have in part enabled widespread copyright theft within the country, not just of video games but other works. The relatively lax copyright rules enables clones based on reskinning an existing game, replacing the art assets with new ones but otherwise not changing the game's code. China's copyright code also makes it difficult to take action on modification of copyrighted characters as these are not explicitly written into Chinese law, which has allowed widespread unlicensed use of others' intellectual property in Chinese games. Though the government has introduced more stringent copyright laws in recent years and harsher penalties for violations, video game clones still persist in China.

One of the first major copyright cases over a video game in China was filed in 2007 by Nexon against Tencent, asserting that Tencent's QQ Tang had copied their Pop Tag. The court's decision in favor of Tencent fixed two concepts that remained part of case law: access to the original game, and whether there was substantial similarity in the claimed elements that violated copyright. The case also established that in considering copyrights of the individual elements, there must be a threshold of originality to be copyrightable. A second key case in 2018 occurred when Woniu Technology, the creators of Taiji Panda, sued Tianxiang Company over their mobile game Hua Qian Gu as a reskinned clone of Taija Panda. While Tianxiang attempted to argue that the overall game could not be copyrighted, the court established precedence that a video game fell into the category of cinematographic works, and that the expression of gameplay can be copyrighted, establishing this principle in case law.

A 2015 World of Warcraft-related dispute illustrated the use of interim relief in Chinese video game IP litigation. Blizzard Entertainment and NetEase affiliate Shanghai EaseNet sought an injunction against a mobile game operated by Beijing Fenbo Times (Rekoo), alleging copyright infringement, unauthorized use of distinctive game names and presentation, and false advertising. The Guangzhou Intellectual Property Court found a high likelihood of success, noted the short life cycle and rapid dissemination of online games, and ordered the defendants to stop reproducing, distributing and communicating the game through information networks pending judgment. The plaintiffs provided a cash security of RMB 10 million for the injunction.

== Patents ==
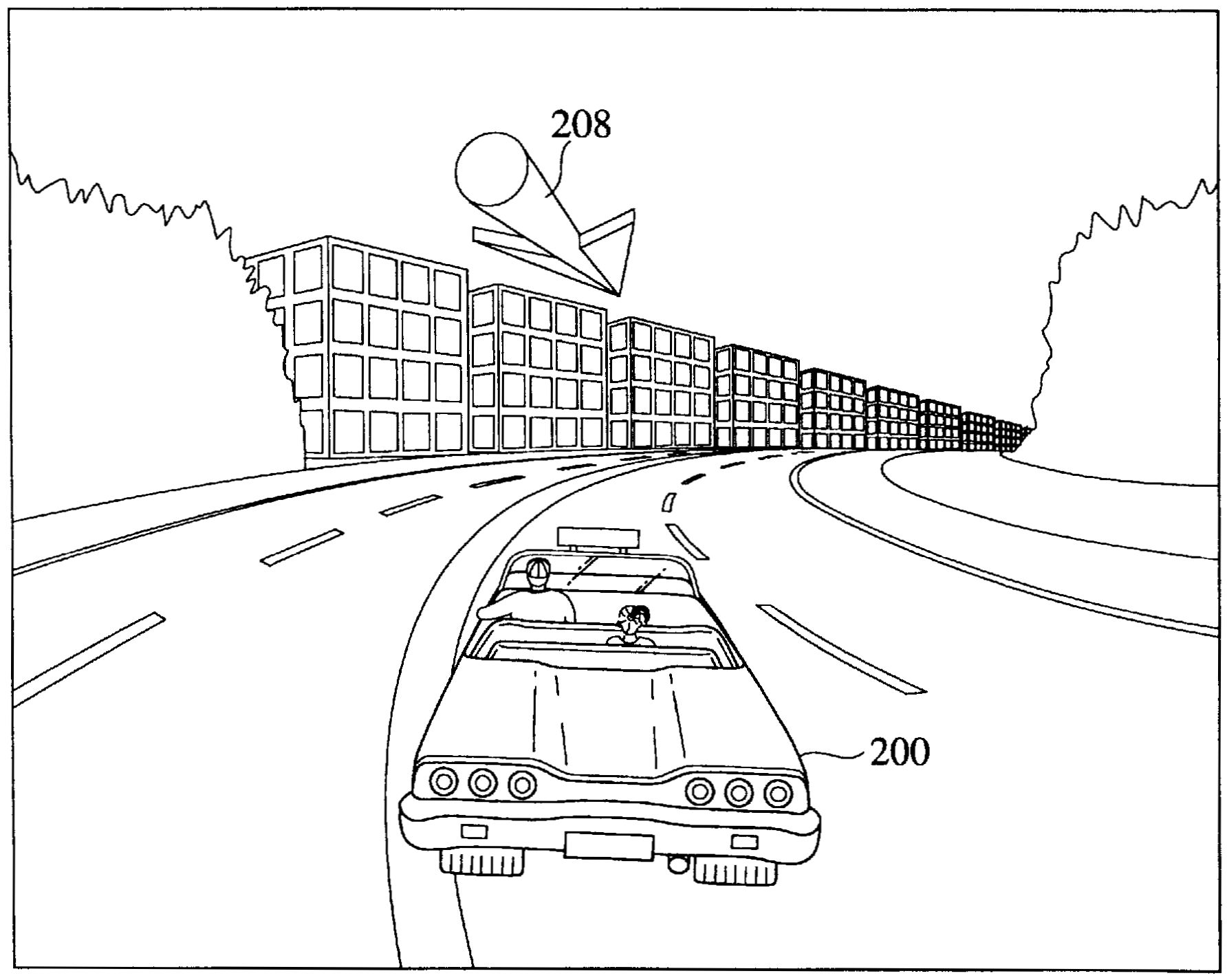
Sega patented the core gameplay mechanics of games like Crazy Taxi to prevent cloning.

Patents are frequently used to protect hardware consoles from cloning. Though patents do not cover elements like the form and shape of a console, they can be used to protect the internal hardware and electronic components, as Magnavox had used at the onset of the arcade game and home console clones. Notably, many of the patents for the Famicom and NES expired in 2003 and 2005, respectively, leading to additional grey market hardware clones within a short time. However, Nintendo had built other intellectual property protection into their system, specifically the 10NES lock-out system, covered by copyright law, that would allow only authorized games to be played on their hardware.

Less frequently, patents have been used to protect video game software elements. Notably, Sega had filed a 1998 United States patent for the gameplay concepts in Crazy Taxi. The company subsequently sued Fox Interactive for patent infringement over their title The Simpsons: Road Rage, citing that the latter game was developed to "deliberately copy and imitate" the Crazy Taxi game. The case was ultimately settled out of court. Other known examples of gameplay patents include those for minigames on loading screens filed by Namco, the dialog choice wheel used in Mass Effect games by Bioware, the katamari of the Katamari Damacy games from Bandai Namco, and the Nemesis system from Middle-earth: Shadow of Mordor by Warner Bros. Interactive Entertainment. Nintendo and The Pokemon Company have filed a patent infringement lawsuit against Pocketpair, the developers of Palworld, accusing the company of violating their patents related to monster-catching games.

== Trademarks ==
Another approach some companies have used to prevent clones is via trademarks as to prevent clones and knockoffs. Notably, King have gotten a United States trademark on the word "Candy" in the area of video games to protect clones and player confusion for their game Candy Crush Saga. They have also sought to block the use of the word "Saga" in the trademark filing of The Banner Saga for similar reasons, despite the games having no common elements. Within the European Union, one can register for a European Union trade mark that includes multimedia elements, which would allow a developer or publisher to trademark a specific gameplay element that is novel from past games, providing a different route for them to protect their work from cloning. For example, Rebellion Developments filed to register its "Kill Cam" mechanic as a trademark from its series Sniper Elite in October 2017, though as of February 2018, the application is still being reviewed.

As technology progresses, creator capabilities and consumer expectations trend toward more realistic demands for video games. More realistic gaming can increase the user experience, enhancing immersion and increasing emotional engagement. A problem can arise when games become too similar to the real world, imitating or copying real-life objects or scenarios. In 2020, a New York district court ruled that Activision did not violate trademark law by including a Humvee in its Call of Duty game. The court said the United States' First Amendment protected Activision's use of the Humvee. Further, the court, relying on Rogers v. Grimaldi, rejected the trademark infringement claim, saying that because the trademark was used for artistic purposes and did not mislead customers, Activision was not infringing on the mark.

In a similar vein, the 2022 case Saber Interactive Inc. v. Oovee Ltd. also highlighted the tension between trademark protection and artistic expression in video games. In this instance, Saber Interactive held exclusive rights to depict the K-700 tractor in its game Mudrunner, yet Oovee used the same vehicle in its competing game, Spintires. The court found that video games are expressive works deserving of First Amendment protection and that Oovee’s use of the K-700 did not infringe on Saber’s trademarks. Applying the Rogers test, the court determined that Oovee’s depiction of the K-700 had no artistic relevance to Saber's and did not explicitly mislead consumers. These cases demonstrate that while realism is a valued aspect of immersive gaming, courts carefully consider the balance between artistic expression and trademark rights, often favoring the former when it serves a genuine creative purpose without misleading the public.

== Licensing ==
A related aspect of video games and intellectual property is the licensing of other properties for use within the video game. This can come in many potential forms:

- Some games are developed as tie-ins to the release of another property as to help with that property's marketing and promotion, such as Superman 64 which was used as a tie-in to Superman: The Animated Series In other cases, games may simply used the licensed setting outside of the tie-in function, such as in the case of Batman: Arkham Asylum.
- Many games incorporate existing contemporary music from famous bands and musicians, each which must be licensed individuals. This is common for most rhythm games like Guitar Hero, as well as a common feature in Grand Theft Auto and various GTA clones for music played on an in-game car radio station.
- Various crossover games bring in characters, settings and other elements from other video games commonly outside of the publisher's IP realm, such as in the case of the Super Smash Bros. series.

This type of licensing tends to pose an issue for the retention and preservation of video games particular on digital download services. Publisher can sometimes secure perpetual rights to a licensed property, such as in the case of Ubisoft with the name Tom Clancy. Otherwise, with limited-time licenses, publishers are generally required to remove the game from sale at the end of that term, though existing owners of the game often still have rights to redownload and use the game as necessary. For example, the Forza Motorsport series includes realistic models of numerous existing car models which are licensed from the car manufacturers. These licensing terms are limited, requiring publisher Microsoft to pull the game from sale roughly four years after release; Microsoft has generally established a development model where as the last iteration of Forza is about to be pulled, the next version, with a fresh start on the car licenses, was released. In one predominate example, Grand Theft Auto IV had to update the game for all digital owners to remove songs on the soundtrack which their ten-year license had expired.

=== Publicity rights ===
The right of publicity is a relatively modern intellectual property right that safeguards an individual's ability to commercially profit from their name, image, or likeness. Issues of publicity rights in video games can arise in sports titles, where developers use the names and likenesses of hundreds or even thousands of individuals to enhance a game's authenticity and appeal.

Publicity rights pose a particular concern when the athletes in question are amateurs. Electronic Arts' NCAA Football and NCAA Basketball (series) titles each used the names, images, and likenesses of collegiate athletes from hundreds of different universities in the United States. Because then-current National Collegiate Athletic Association amateurism bylaws prohibited student-athletes from receiving any monetary or in-kind benefit from the use of their publicity rights, EA included athletes' names, images, and likenesses without providing any sort of compensation to the athletes.

This tension between the NCAA's amateurism rules and student-athletes' right of publicity claims resulted in several lawsuits against EA, beginning with the cases Hart v. Electronic Arts, 717 F.3d 141 (2013) and In re NCAA Student-Athlete Name and Likeness Licensing Litigation, 724 F. 3d 1268 (2013). In Hart, the United States Court of Appeals for the Third Circuit reversed the lower court's award of summary judgment in favor of EA. The appellate court held that, applying the transformative-use test, EA failed to demonstrate that its First Amendment rights superseded former Rutgers University football player Ryan Hart's right of publicity. Similarly, the United States Court of Appeals for the Ninth Circuit in In re NCAA Student-Athlete Name and Likeness Licensing Litigation held that under the transformative-use test "EA's use does not qualify for First Amendment protection as a matter of law because it literally recreates Keller in the very setting in which he has achieved renown."

The Plaintiffs in Hart, In re NCAA, and the later case O'Bannon v. NCAA (2005) later settled with EA to resolve their disputes. In response to litigation costs and uncertainty caused by the lawsuits, EA announced it would cancel future releases of NCAA Football and NCAA Basketball titles. This continued until 2021, when changes to NCAA name, image, and likeness policies allowed student-athletes to personally license and profit from their publicity rights.
