= Tetris Holding, LLC v. Xio Interactive, Inc. =

2012 legal case

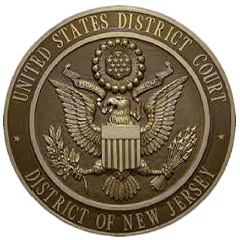
- Court: United States District Court for the District of New Jersey
- Full case name: Tetris Holding, LLC and The Tetris Company v. Xio Interactive, Inc.
- Decided: May 30, 2012
- Citation: 863 F.Supp.2d 394 (D.N.J. 2012)
- Transcript: Opinion

Court membership
- Judge sitting: Freda L. Wolfson

Tetris Holding, LLC v. Xio Interactive, Inc., 863 F.Supp.2d 394 (D.N.J. 2012), was a 2012 American legal case related to copyright of video games, confirming that a game's look and feel can be protected under copyright law. Tetris Holding is a company that holds the copyright to the original Tetris game from 1985 and licenses those rights to game developers. Xio Interactive is a game developer that released Mino in 2009, a mobile game based on the gameplay of Tetris. Mino was downloaded millions of times, and Tetris Holding filed a DMCA notice and eventually a lawsuit against Xio for copyright infringement.

The earliest video game case law had protected the designs in Galaxian and Pac-Man. But later cases such as Data East USA, Inc. v. Epyx, Inc. found that it is permissible to make a video game clone with similar ideas and principles as another game, since copyright does not protect an idea, only the specific expression of that idea. A trial occurred in 2012, the first case in a long time to proceed to trial on this issue. The district court ruled for Tetris Holding, with Judge Wolfson applying the Abstraction-Filtration-Comparison test to determine if any infringement occurred. Although standard gameplay ideas are not copyrightable, Mino was still substantially similar to Tetris in terms of its art style, and those elements are in fact protected by copyright. This case has since been applied in other copyright disputes to offer broader protection to the look and feel of video games.

== Background ==
=== Historical context ===
In 1985, Alexey Pajitnov created the puzzle game Tetris for the Dorodnitsyn Computing Centre at the Soviet Academy of Sciences. Within a few years Tetris became one of the most successful video games of all time. Henk Rogers was one of the key people who brought Tetris to the world by going to Moscow to negotiate for the rights. Rogers later befriended Pajitnov and helped the two acquire ownership of the copyrights from a former Soviet agency. By the early 2000s, Rogers and Pajitnov created The Tetris Company to control the Tetris intellectual property, and to license their rights to game developers who comply with certain standards.

In 2009, Desiree Golden founded a game studio called Xio Interactive, and released a mobile game called Mino based on the gameplay of Tetris. Xio had tried to license the rights to Tetris from The Tetris Company, who refused. At that point Xio researched intellectual property law to see how to design a game similar to Tetris that would not include any legally-protected elements. The game Mino featured the same approach of using falling tetromino blocks to form complete lines on a playfield and score points. Mino also added new power-ups and game modes to the basic Tetris gameplay. The game's marketing materials described it as a "Tetromino game" with "fast-paced, line-clearing features", and ended with a disclaimer: "Mino and Xio Interactive are not affiliated with Tetris™ or the Tetris Company™".

While there have been many Tetris clones, Mino was eventually downloaded more than six million times. In August 2009, Tetris Holdings sent DMCA notices to Xio via Apple requesting that Apple take Mino down from the App Store. As part of the DMCA process, Xio filed a counter-notice and Apple re-instated the game to their store. Since Apple could not permanently remove the software without a legal order to do so, The Tetris Company filed a lawsuit against Xio Interactive in December 2009 in the United States District Court for the District of New Jersey.

=== Legal principles ===
The earliest video game case law was an extension of other copyright cases in media and technology, offering copyright protection to original characters and specific sequences of code, but not to gameplay systems that are essential to create a game. Copyright jurisprudence developed a legal doctrine called the idea–expression distinction, which says that copyright does not protect a general idea, only one expression of an idea. Based on this, copyright does not protect scènes à faire, where stock scenes and generic details are common among creative works. There is also the merger doctrine where some ideas may only have a limited number of ways of being expressed, and it would be legally unfair to protect expression if it effectively gives someone a monopoly on an idea. For this reason, the Copyright Office advises that "copyright does not protect the idea for a game, its name or title, or the method or methods for playing it. Nor does copyright protect any idea, system, method, device, or trademark material involved in developing, merchandising, or playing a game. Once a game has been made public, nothing in copyright law prevents others from developing another game based on similar principles."

These principles had been interpreted to protect the shapes of insect-like aliens in Galaxian, as well as protecting Pac-Man from a copy called K.C. Munchkin! in the 1982 case Atari v. Philips. However, copyright has also been interpreted to allow video game clones that closely matched gameplay concepts as long as their expression was original. This has allowed the creation of games that share many similarities, including World Karate Championship and Karate Champ in the late 1980s (decided in Data East v. Epyx), or Fighter's History and Street Fighter II in the early 1990s (decided in Capcom v. Data East). This has been interpreted to mean that a game's expressive elements are copyrightable, with game mechanics and rules being freely copyable as ideas. With the costs of filing a lawsuit being very high compared to the expected outcome, many video game copyright holders became hesitant to sue alleged clones. Most lawsuits about alleged clones were settled between the mid-1990s and the mid-2000s, and Xio became a rare case that proceeded to trial on this issue.

== Ruling ==
Comparison of Tetris (left) and Mino in Judge Wolfson's analysis, illustrating that the two games put side by side were nearly indistinguishable

The case was assigned to Judge Freda L. Wolfson. In defending the copyright claim, Xio founder Desiree Golden admitted to having copied Mino directly from the official Tetris app that was developed under license by Electronic Arts. Golden also admitted that they had sought a license to Tetris from Tetris Holdings, who turned them down. Subsequently, Golden continued to develop Mino based on their understanding of video game case law, and believed that they could avoid infringing on Tetris's expression by creating new audio and video assets.

Judge Wolfson ruled early that, as previously established, the gameplay of Tetris was not copyrightable. The New Jersey district court was within the Third Circuit, which had prior case law from Whelan v. Jaslow (797 F.2d 1222 (1987)) that used a purpose-based test to abstract software to determine if copyright was infringed. Wolfson also explored case law from other circuits, using the Abstraction-Filtration-Comparison test (AFC) for substantial similarity that had been first defined in Nichols v. Universal Pictures Corp. (45 F.2d 119 (1930)) and then applied to computer software in Computer Associates International, Inc. v. Altai, Inc. (982 F.2d 693 (1992)). Two video game cases, Atari v. Philips (related to Pac-Man and an alleged clone K.C. Munchkin!) and Midway Manufacturing Co. v. Bandai-America, Inc. (related to handheld clones of Midway's Galaxian) were found to have been ruled in the same manner as the AFC test, and Wolfson decided to apply them to Mino. Wolfson explained that the court should compare the games "as they would appear to a layman [by] concentrating upon the gross features rather than an examination of minutiae", essentially comparing the games' respective look and feel; Wolfson further wrote "[i]f one has to squint to find distinctions only at a granular level, then the works are likely to be substantially similar".

Wolfson discussed which aspects of Tetris were copyrightable as expressive elements, and which aspects are part of the general idea that cannot be protected by copyright. According to Wolfson, copyright cannot protect the idea of vertically falling blocks, or a player rotating those blocks to form lines and earn points, or a player losing the game if those blocks accumulate at the top of the screen. However, Wolfson determined that several aspects of Tetris qualify as unique expression that is protected by copyright. This includes the twenty-by-ten square game board, the display of randomized junk blocks at the start of the game, the display of a block's "shadow" where it will land, and the display of the next piece to fall. Wolfson also granted protection to the blocks changing in color when they land, and the game board filling up when the game is over.

With the expressive elements of Tetris under copyright protection, copying one of these elements would not necessarily prove there has been copyright infringement, in isolation. However, Wolfson found that Mino co-opted all of these elements, which had no development purpose "other than to avoid the difficult task of developing its own take on a known idea". In her analysis, Wolfson quickly concluded that Mino failed the AFC test as it looked so similar to Tetris side-by-side. Further, Wolfson rejected the merger doctrine claim that Golden had proposed, since the details of the art style used in the Tetris blocks had "are not part of the ideas, rules, or functions of the game nor are they essential or inseparable from the ideas, rules, or functions of the game." Wolfson further dismissed Golden's scènes à faire arguments, ruling that Tetris was a unique game and thus had no established stock or common imagery that would be ineligible for protection. In weighing these arguments, Wolfson noted that Mino copied Tetris much more closely than a game like Dr. Mario, a game that utilized the rules of Tetris to express a similar idea in a unique and non-infringing way.

Wolfson also examined at Mino's marketing materials to determine if they infringed the trade dress of Tetris. Where Mino's marketing used the same color and style of the pieces from Tetris, these details were distinct expression and not merely functional ideas in the public domain. Wolfson determined that this created a likelihood that consumers would confuse Mino with Tetris, and held that Mino's trade dress was infringing. Wolfson subsequently granted summary judgment in Tetris Holding's favor, and entered an injunction that permanently prohibited Xio from distributing or marketing their game.

== Impact ==
As Golden did not appeal the case to the Third Circuit, the decision is only binding precedent on the District of New Jersey. However other courts have cited the ruling as relevant case law in evaluating other video game cloning cases and have relied upon it to establish a new approach to evaluating copyrights surrounding the look and feel of video games. Legal scholars have included this decision in a wave of cases that have pushed the boundaries of video game copyright protection, along with Electronic Arts Inc. v. Zynga Inc. from 2012. Also in 2012, Spry Fox, LLC v. Lolapps, Inc. was heard in the United States District Court for the Western District of Washington, brought by Spry Fox against developer Lolapps over their game Yeti Town which Spry Fox claimed was a copyright-infringing clone of Triple Town. At the initial hearings, the judge followed similar logic used in the Xio case to order a preliminary injunction in favor of Spry Fox, as Yeti Town had the same look-and-feel as Triple Town when simply viewed side by side. The case was subsequently settled out of court, with Spry Fox gaining ownership of the Yeti Town property by the end of 2012. Since these cases in 2012, legal scholars have found that courts have been more scrutinizing of look-and-feel in cases involving video game clones.

Despite warnings that the case might lead to an explosion of intellectual property disputes and copyright trolls, there has only been an incremental increase, with the courts applying this legal standard carefully to new cases. Nicholas Lampros also noted that the facts of this case were highly specific, leading to "a narrow, fact-heavy legal standard, the outcome of which is difficult to predict outside of court". He added that this would put more onus on digital distribution platforms to manage potentially infringing products. Tom Phillips has noted that the high cost and uncertainty of fact-specific litigation has led developers to hold each other accountable in the media, as an alternative to legal action.

== Analysis ==
By contrasting this case with early video game rulings such as Atari v. Amusement World, it is possible to see the difference between a free idea versus copyrightable expression. Scholars have argued that this case represents the game medium coming of age, evolving from rudimentary gameplay into sufficiently expressive systems that are worthy of copyright protection. This coincides with the legal system having more experience and understanding of video games, where the judge who decided the case was 18 when Pong was released. The ruling shows the courts using a "high level of understanding of video game mechanics for the first time".

Susan Corbett argues that "the Tetris decision supports the view that United States courts are becoming more accepting of the possibility of offering broader copyright protection for videogames". Tomasz Grzegorczyk notes that this case shows courts are willing to recognize that the "graphic user interface of the game is subject to protection under copyright in the same manner as audiovisual works". Noting that the copyright infringing game copied exact shapes and colors, Steven Conway and Jennifer deWinter argue that the decision would not impact other alleged game clones that are less similar. Josh Davenport and Ross Dannenberg suggest that while a "standard game device" may be too generic to warrant copyright protection, that a specific selection or arrangement of those devices would quality as unique expression, and thus be copyrightable. John Kuehl calls this case a potential killing blow to knock off video games that are near copies of the original.
