= Capcom U.S.A. Inc. v. Data East Corp. =

1994 legal case

- Court: United States District Court for the Northern District of California
- Decided: March 16, 1994
- Citation: 1994 WL 1751482 (N.D. Cal. Mar. 16, 1994)

Court membership
- Judge sitting: William H. Orrick Jr.

Capcom U.S.A. Inc. v. Data East Corp., 1994 WL 1751482 (N.D. Cal, 1994) was a 1994 legal case in which the video game developer Capcom alleged that Data East's game Fighter's History infringed the copyright of its game Street Fighter II. The design documents for Fighter's History contained several references to Street Fighter II, leading Capcom to sue Data East for damages, as well as a preliminary injunction to stop the distribution of Fighter's History.

In spite of the intentional similarities, the court concluded that Data East did not infringe upon Capcom's copyright, as most of these similarities were not protected under copyright. Judge William H. Orrick Jr. applied a legal principle known as the merger doctrine, where courts will not grant copyright protection where it would effectively give someone a monopoly over an idea.

Although early cases such as Atari v. Philips ruled against K.C. Munchkin! for infringing on the copyright of Pac-Man, they also noted that any standard elements of a game could not be protected by copyright. Courts later expanded on this principle, establishing that copyright did not protect generic concepts, functional rules, and scènes à faire. This included an earlier legal dispute, when Data East lost their case against an alleged video game clone of their game Karate Champ because none of the similarities were protected under copyright.

Years later, Data East found themselves on the other side of a similar dispute, and the court determined that the contents of Fighter's History were legally permissible. This trend of a more permissive approach to copyright continued until 2012, when rulings such as Tetris Holding, LLC v. Xio Interactive, Inc. and Spry Fox, LLC v. Lolapps, Inc. ruled that more specific forms of copying are unlawful.

== Background ==
=== Facts ===
In 1991, Game developer Capcom released Street Fighter II. Its popularity led to an explosion of interest in the fighting game genre. Other companies rushed to capitalize, and Data East released their own one-on-one fighting game called Fighter's History in 1993. Even compared to other fighting games, there were many similarities between Fighter's History and Street Fighter II, with both games having similar character designs and artwork, as well as similar special moves and controls. As it was later revealed, Data East created design documents that referred to Street Fighter II several times. Several people noticed the similarities and raised the issue with Capcom, reaching the president, Kenzo Tsujimoto. Capcom soon sued Data East for copyright infringements, in both America and Japan. Capcom sought 623 million yen in damages, as well as a preliminary injunction to stop Data East from distributing Fighter's History.

There was some terrible evidence. I mean, the fact of the matter is the Data East artists were copying Street Fighter. The ultimate work wasn't a slavish copy — a pixel-by-pixel copy — but they had evidence that we were copying things. And our response was, well, what we were copying wasn't protectable. So for example, we might make a copy of one of their images, but then we'd change the image, change the background, change the fighter's stance, change the type of kick. But even then, there was a lot of similarity in the kicks and the moves. But of course our response was, "Well wait a minute. Those are conventional moves within the martial arts field. You can't own that."

— Claude Stern, trial counsel representing Data East

External videos
- Video by Data East compares Fighter's History characters to those Capcom claims were copied from Street Fighter II in the lawsuit.
- Fighter's History vs. Street Fighter II Character Comparison - Lawsuit Exhibit Video

=== Law ===
This dispute would depend on whether the copied elements of Street Fighter II were actually protected by copyright. Data East called on expert witness Bill Kunkel, a game journalist who testified in Atari v. Philips that not all copying is infringing, such as the similarity between K.C. Munchkin! and Pac-Man. The court ruled that K.C. Munchkin! did infringe the copyright of Pac-Man, because the games had substantial similarities. However, the court also noted that several aspects of the games were standard or common, and thus not protected by copyright.

By the late 1980s, courts began to take a more permissive approach with video game clones, deciding that many elements of creativity cannot be protected, such as generic concepts, functional rules, and scènes à faire. One such ruling was the 1988 case Data East USA, Inc. v. Epyx, Inc., where courts ruled that Epyx's game World Karate Championship did not infringe Data East's game Karate Champ, because none of the similarities were protected under copyright. Now years later, Data East argued that their game Karate Champ was the first game in the fighting genre. Data East also argued that the similarities between their game and Street Fighter II were not protected by copyright, as they were both inspired by the same form of game, and the same stereotyped characters in the public domain. Data East was confident in their argument, because Epyx had used the same argument against them in Data East v. Epyx, where courts found that copyright did not protect the general ideas in Karate Champ.

== Ruling ==
Memorandum Decision and Order dated August 18, 1994

The trial took place on October 31, 1994. Judge William H. Orrick Jr. stated that there was strong evidence that Data East set out to imitate the success of Street Fighter II, noting similarities such as a "Chun-Li clone" (referring to Feilin) and several comparable special moves. The court noted that "of the eight pairs of characters and twenty-seven special moves at issue, three characters and five special moves in Fighter’s History are similar to protectable characters and special moves in Street Fighter II". Although the court determined that several moves were similar, the court also noted that "Street Fighter II has a total universe of twelve characters and six hundred and fifty moves. Capcom concedes, as it must, that the vast majority of the moves are unprotectable because they are commonplace kicks and punches."

Capcom lost the case on grounds that the copied elements were excluded from copyright protection, as generic scènes à faire. Judge Orrick applied a legal principle known as the merger doctrine, where courts will not extend copyright protection if it effectively gives someone a monopoly over an idea. The court affirmed that "copyright protection does not encompass games as such, since they consist of abstract rules and play ideas. It follows, therefore, that audiovisual works like the two presently before the Court are largely unprotectable games."

== Legacy ==
As a historic ruling, Capcom v. Data East expanded on the principle that generic similarities between games are allowable under copyright law. Data East established that Fighter's History was not infringing based on the precedent from Data East v. Epyx, which Nadia Oxford of 1UP.com noted as "ironic" because Data East lost the older case. Courts continued this approach for many years, ruling in favor of most video game clones until enforcing some limits in the 2012 case Tetris Holding, LLC v. Xio Interactive. Tetris v. Xio found that copyright does protect a game's more specific elements from infringing copies, compared to the ruling in Capcom v. Data East that suggests a more skeptical view towards copyright protection for video games.

John Quagliariello argues that this was one of several cases that made it near impossible for a video game copyright holder to win a lawsuit against a potential infringer, especially considering the cost of a lawsuit versus the risk of an unfavorable ruling. Chris Kohler of Kotaku argues that this ruling prevented a chilling effect on game creation, allowing video game genres to develop through imitation and iteration. Attorney Stephen C. McArthur mentioned it among several rulings that were permissive of clones, such as Atari v. Amusement World and Data East v. Epyx, a pattern that changed in 2012 with Tetris v. Xio and Spry Fox, LLC v. Lolapps, Inc.
