= Karnov =

1987 video game

- Arcade flyer
- Developer: Data East (Note: NES version developed by Data East and SAS Sakata; Commodore 64 version developed by Mr. Micro Ltd. and Software Studios; Amstrad CPC version developed by Software Studios; IBM PC version developed by Quicksilver Software; Mac OS version developed by Technology Works.)
- Publishers: Data East: NES; JP: Namco; NA: Data East CPC, ZX Spectrum Electric Dreams Software
- Platforms: Arcade, NES, Commodore 64, Amstrad CPC, ZX Spectrum, IBM PC, Mac OS
- Release: January 1987: Arcade; JP: January 1987; NA: March 1987 NES; JP: December 18, 1987; NA: January 1988 C64; EU: March 1988; NA: July 1988 CPC, ZX Spectrum; EU: March 1988 IBM PC; August 1988 Mac OS; 1989
- Genre: Platform
- Modes: Single-player, multiplayer

Karnov (Note: Japanese: カルノフ, Hepburn: Karunofu) is a 1987 platform video game developed and published by Data East for arcades. A Nintendo Entertainment System port followed, which was released in Japan by Namco the same year and in North America by Data East in 1988. Players take control of the title character Jinborov Karnovski, or "Karnov" for short. Karnov is a strongman popularly illustrated as being from an unspecified part of the Soviet Union's Central Asian republics, as shown on the arcade flyer.

As a character created by Data East, Karnov was reintroduced in several other games from the company, including Bad Dudes Vs. DragonNinja in which he is a boss in the first level. Karnov later appeared in the 1993 fighting game Fighter's History, in which he is the final boss, and as a playable character in its sequels, Karnov's Revenge, also known as Fighter's History Dynamite and Fighter's History: Mizoguchi Kiki Ippatsu!!.

Hamster Corporation released the game as part of their Arcade Archives series for the Nintendo Switch and PlayStation 4, as well as their Arcade Archives 2 series for the Nintendo Switch 2, PlayStation 5 and Xbox Series X/S on September 10, 2026.

== Gameplay ==
The game's hero, Karnov, a muscular fire-breathing ex-circus strongman, goes on a quest through nine different levels to search for the ultimate treasure. However, between him and the treasure are several horrendous monsters, including sword-wielding monks, dinosaurs, djinn, hopping fish men, gargoyles, tree monsters, will-o-wisps, rock creatures, centipede women, and ostrich-riding skeleton warriors.

Karnov can walk, jump, and shoot to make his way through these levels and find special items that help him. Acquiring red orbs can upgrade Karnov until he shoots three fireballs at a time. The end of each level has one or more bosses which he must defeat to receive a new piece of a treasure map. The end of the game features a powerful boss called "The Wizard" who defends the last map piece that leads to the treasure.

== Ports ==
Karnov was later ported to numerous home systems, such as the NES, Commodore 64, ZX Spectrum and others.

Was recently added to the Hamster Corp. Arcade Archives digital library on September 10th 2026.

=== IBM PC ===
The IBM PC compatibles port was developed by Quicksilver Software. Like Quicksilver's other Data East ports, such as Commando, Ikari Warriors, and Guerrilla War, it was sold as a self-booting disk.

=== NES ===
The Famicom/NES version was co-developed by Data East (design and audio) and SAS Sakata (programming). It was released on December 18, 1987 in Japan by Namco, and in North America in January 1988 by Data East. Although it plays similarly to the arcade game, there are some noticeable differences:

- Karnov takes two hits to die instead of just one. After being hit once he will turn a blue color in which he has one hit left or can gain an extra hit back by grabbing a blue fireball orb.
- The Super Fireball is replaced with the Spike Bomb which destroys every enemy on screen. The Trolley item is replaced with the Shield which is used to reflect an enemy's fireballs.
- Levels 4 and 8 are completely different from the arcade levels.
- The final boss is no longer the Wizard, but a giant three-headed dragon. Both fights, however, take place in similar rooms.

The Famicom version is notably more difficult since it only offers two continues with the game ending after the third Game Over, and the option is not visibly present after all lives are lost, instead requiring pressing Select and Start at the same time. The NES game, however, provides unlimited continues, and it also allows Karnov to be killed when both the A and B buttons are pressed on the second controller.

Moreover, in the Famicom version, the Game Over screen shows a defeated Karnov that's different each time: the first Game Over screen shows Karnov with a bump on his head, the second Game Over screen adds a bandage to the other side of Karnov's head, and the third and final Game Over screen shows Karnov's arm in a sling, in addition to the aforementioned head bump and bandage. This screen ends the game.

Due to the American version lacking cutscenes, the Game Over screen in the NES version simply shows the message with the option to continue over a black background, lacking the accompanying image of an injured Karnov.

== Reception ==
Reception

Review scores
Publication	Score
Crash	76%
Computer and Video Games	30/40
Sinclair User	10/10
Your Sinclair	9/10
The Games Machine	88%
ACE	612

In Japan, Game Machine listed Karnov as the fourth most successful table arcade unit of February 1987. Karnov's sales had surpassed 250,000 copies by November 1989.

Bill Kunkel reviewed the game for Computer Gaming World, calling it an off-beat variation on a familiar video game play mechanic.

The IBM PC version of the game was reviewed in 1989 in Dragon #142 by Hartley, Patricia, and Kirk Lesser in "The Role of Computers" column. The reviewers gave the game 4½ out of 5 stars.

== Legacy ==
Although no direct sequel to Karnov was released, Data East has used the title character as an enemy. In some games, such as Garyo Retsuden, Tumblepop and Trio the Punch (featuring enormous stone statues and even mini versions of the character), Karnov is featured as a regular enemy.

In other Data East games, he is featured as a boss character. In Bad Dudes Vs. DragonNinja, Karnov is the first level's boss. A pale grey version of Karnov appears later in the game. According to the credits sequence of the Japanese version of the game, this version of Karnov is called Kusamochi Karnov, after the green sweet kusamochi.

Karnov is also the last opponent in the original Fighter's History, and becomes a playable character in its sequels: Karnov's Revenge and Fighter's History: Mizoguchi Kiki Ippatsu!!. Although not an official cameo, the guard boss from the Gaelco game, Big Karnak, is almost identical to Karnov's and Kusamoci Karnov's sprites from Bad Dudes vs. DragonNinja.

Karnov has also made various cameo appearances. He appears in the alley background of the Neo-Geo game Street Slam. He is shown wearing a shirt with a "K" on it. Karnov also appears in the credits of the independently-developed freeware game I Wanna Be the Guy. In Shantae and the Pirate's Curse, a ghostly silhouette who helps the titular character is highly similar to Karnov, and is even implied to be her long-lost father.

== See also ==
- Atomic Runner Chelnov
- Karnov's Revenge
- Fighter's History characters
