= Trio the Punch =

1990 video game

- Arcade flyer
- Developer: Data East
- Publisher: Data East
- Platform: Arcade
- Release: April 1990
- Genre: Beat 'em up
- Modes: Single-player, multiplayer

Trio the Punch (Note: Japanese: トリオ・ザ・パンチ, Hepburn: Torio Za Panchi) is a 1990 beat 'em up video game developed and published by Data East for arcades. It was only released in Japan in April 1990. Chelnov and Karnov were produced by the same director, with both games' titular lead characters making cameos.

Hamster Corporation released the game as part of the Oretachi Gēsen Zoku series for the PlayStation 2 in 2007, as well as part of the Arcade Archives series for the Nintendo Switch and PlayStation 4 in May 2022.

== Gameplay ==
Trio the Punch is a beat 'em up game where the player chooses a character from three playable characters, and fights numerous enemies across a side-scrolling game screen. Most of the levels are played scrolling to the right, but some loop around the left and right edges of the screen. Other levels allow the player to scroll upwards or downwards by jumping, while some do not contain scrolling at all. The game is completed when the player finishes all 35 levels. Certain enemies leave behind a heart on the screen after being defeated, and collecting the required number of these hearts for each level causes a boss to appear, who must be defeated in order to complete the level. The bosses appear from the start in some levels, so hearts do not always need to be collected. Though the game is seemingly an orthodox side-scrolling action game, jumping on top of enemy bullets causes the player's character to bounce away as if he had landed on a trampoline. This action occurs often throughout the game, but the image of bouncing off of small bullets gives the game an unnatural feel where the laws of physics are ignored. The game follows an unconventional level structure, where defeating a number of enemies is sufficient for the player to encounter and defeat the boss.

Trio the Punch is similar to games like Parodius and Konami Wai Wai World in the sense that Data East parodied some of its own games by having Karnov and Chelnov appear as enemies. Other parodic elements include the Darumasan ga koronda feature, where all of the objects on the screen are forced to stop moving.

== Reception ==
In Japan, Game Machine listed Trio the Punch. on their May 15, 1990 issue as being the twenty-fourth most-successful table arcade unit of the month.

== Development ==
The game was initially planned as a sugoroku game titled TV Sugoroku Trio the Punch (TVすごろく トリオ・ザ・パンチ), the content was completely changed during production into its released form, according to the arcade game magazine Arcadia (Coin Op'ed Video Game Magazine Arcadia). The sheep from this game later appeared in Suiko Enbu: Fuunsaiki as Makoto Mizoguchi's desperation move.
