= Data East USA, Inc. v. Epyx, Inc. =

1988 legal case

- Court: United States Court of Appeals for the Ninth Circuit
- Decided: November 30, 1988
- Citations: 862 F.2d 204, 9 U.S.P.Q.2d (BNA) 1322

Case history
- Prior actions: Epyx published a karate video game with gameplay fairly similar to the Data East's karate game, which was already available for several years. Data East subsequently brought action against Epyx for, among other allegations, copyright infringement. The district court ruled for Data East on the copyright infringement issue and Epyx appealed.

Court membership
- Judges sitting: James R. Browning, Procter Ralph Hug Jr., Stephen S. Trott

Case opinions
- There was no infringement on the copyright of Data East by Epyx.

Keywords
- Copyright infringement

Data East USA, Inc. v. Epyx, Inc. 862 F.2d 204, 9 U.S.P.Q.2d (BNA) 1322 (9th Cir. 1988) was a court case between two video game manufacturers, where Data East claimed that their copyright in Karate Champ was infringed by World Karate Championship, a game published by Epyx. Data East released Karate Champ in arcades in 1984, and the game became a best-seller and pioneered the fighting game genre. The next year, Epyx published World Karate Championship for home computers, which sold 1.5 million copies. Data East sued Epyx, alleging that the game infringed on their copyright and trademark.

The district court found that Epyx had infringed on Data East's copyright, but not their trademark, and ordered an injunction against distributing World Karate Championship. However, the United States Court of Appeals for the Ninth Circuit court reversed the decision on appeal, finding that the lower court erred in finding that the works were substantially similar. As a principle, there is no substantial similarity between the expression of two works if the expression is inseparable from the idea. The court also applied the scènes à faire doctrine that no one can own a generic scene, and the merger doctrine that no one can own the expression to an idea if there is only one way to express it. Although the games shared fifteen similarities, the court determined these were inherent to making a video game about karate, and lifted the injunction against Epyx.

In the 1994 case Capcom U.S.A. Inc. v. Data East Corp., Data East used the same principle to defend its game Fighter's History from Capcom's accusations that they infringed Street Fighter II. This led most lawsuits about alleged video game clones to be settled between the mid-1990s through to the mid-2000s. This approach began to shift in 2012 with Tetris Holding, LLC v. Xio Interactive, Inc. and Spry Fox, LLC v. Lolapps, Inc., as graphical improvements have made it harder to dismiss similarities as a coincidence of technological limitation.

== Background ==
=== Facts ===
Despite being originally asked to complete the work on a totally different game, I did go off and evolve all the programming, graphics and sound effects myself, and pointed out that a karate game with two karate players wearing red and white karate suits fighting within the familiar rules of a bout of karate is bound to look similar to any other game featuring karate players wearing karate suits and doing karate moves in timed bouts of karate fighting! I think that's why the look and feel and rules became better defined. At a high level of abstraction it's easy to say that Karate Champ is like Fist is like IK1 is like Tekken and so on. They all feature bouts of timed karate-type gameplay.

— Archer Maclean, developer of International Karate

In 1984, Data East released an arcade fighting game called Karate Champ. The game was a commercial success in arcades, becoming the top grossing cabinet in both Japan and America. The game once again became a best-seller when it was re-released for home computers, becoming the first game to receive a "Diamond Award" from the Software Publishers Association for sales above 500,000 units. Karate Champ is considered the first fighting game, and the player versus player version is the first fighting game to allow two players to fight each other.

In 1985, System 3 began producing a karate game of their own, when their programmer and artist walked off the project. They approached game developer Archer Maclean to salvage the project, who decided re-start development by emulating other popular arcade martial arts games, such as The Way of the Exploding Fist. The final product was International Karate, which was published as World Karate Championship by Epyx in North America. The game went on to sell over 1.5 million copies in the United States, as the first European-made game to top the Billboard software charts.

The success of International Karate attracted scrutiny from competitors, and Data East alleged that the game had copied their game Karate Champ without authorization. Maclean began to receive questions about the games' similarities, and he responded that two games about organized karate matches are likely to be similar. There indeed were similarities such as the scoring systems, referees, and several fighting moves. Also the games both one combatant wearing white, and the other wearing red, with a bonus round between matches where the combatants break bricks and dodge objects. Data East sued Epyx for copyright infringement, as well as infringement in Karate Champ's Trademark and Trade Dress.

=== Law ===
Courts have used the substantial similarity test to determine whether one work has unlawfully copied another, while allowing copying in instances where the similarities are not owned by anyone. One of the most influential cases in this area was Atari v. Amusement World from 1981, where the court listed numerous similarities between the games Asteroids and its alleged clone, Meteors. Despite twenty-two similarities, the court determined that these were unprotected ideas that are inherent to the game concept of shooting rocks in space. At the time, it was one of the only cases to rule in favor of the defendant, based on the idea-expression distinction that copyright does not protect broad ideas, only unique expression. Using similar principles, the court concluded that the video game K.C. Munchkin! infringed several protected elements of Pac-Man, in Atari, Inc. v. North American Philips Consumer Electronics Corp. At the time, courts had started to apply complex copyright principles to video games to show that certain elements are ineligible for copyright protection. This includes the scènes à faire doctrine that generic scenes cannot be owned by anyone, as well as the merger doctrine that no one can own the expression to an idea if that's one of the only ways to express it.

== Ruling and appeal ==
=== District Court ===
The case was heard in the United States District Court for the Northern District of California, where the court ruled that Epyx had infringed upon Data East's copyright, but not their trademark. One of the issues was whether Epyx had accessed Data East's game. Since they provided no evidence that they created their game independently, the similarities were strong enough for the district court to infer that Epyx likely purchased it and discovered the underlying program. Even though the district court acknowledged a few cosmetic differences between the games, they still concluded that the idea expressed in both games is identical. A major factor in the ruling was the determination that the average consumer, a 17.5 year old male, would subjectively regard the two games as substantially similar. The court ordered a permanent injunction against Epyx, and an impoundment that restrained Epyx from further sale or distribution of World Karate Championship. Epyx was required to recall all copies of the infringing work.

=== Appeal ===
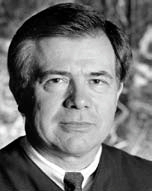
Judge Stephen S. Trott wrote the opinion for the United States Court of Appeals for the Ninth Circuit.

Epyx appealed the case to the United States Court of Appeals for the Ninth Circuit, alleging that the district court was mistaken about the substantial similarity between the games. Epyx did not dispute that Data East owned a valid copyright in Karate Champ, but disputed that there had been direct copying, and that the similarities between the games were evidence of copyright infringement. The central issue in the appeal was whether the similarities between the games were result of unlawful copying, or if they were the inherent result of making a game about karate.

Writing for the appeal court, Judge Stephen S. Trott noted that copyright disputes seldom have evidence of one party directly copying another. Thus, Data East needed to provide circumstantial evidence that Epyx had copied them, including evidence that Epyx had access to Karate Champ while making World Karate Championship, and that the two games were substantially similar. To determine the question of substantial similarity, Judge Trott applied the framework used in the copyright case Sid & Marty Krofft Television Productions Inc. v. McDonald's Corp., with an additional analysis of elements that fall outside of copyright protection. An analysis of substantial similarity should exclude unprotectable elements, which are eliminated by applying the idea-expression dichotomy, the merger doctrine, and the scènes à faire doctrine. The court summarized the principle that "no substantial similarity of expression will be found when the idea and its expression are inseparable."

The court found that the games shared fifteen characteristics. However, the court determined that these characteristics, "which consist of the game procedure, common karate moves, the idea of background scenes, a time element, a referee, computer graphics, and bonus points, result from either constraints inherent in the sport of karate or computer restraints." This echoed the analysis in Atari v. Amusement World, explaining that the variety of possible expression was limited by the technology, thus raising the likelihood that any game's expressive elements would merge with the idea. Since the two games were not similar enough to constitute copyright infringement, the question of access became moot. The court further explained that "the visual depiction of karate matches is subject to the constraints inherent in the sport of karate itself," and many of the similar elements are "indispensable, or at least standard" to creating a karate game. Since many of these features are stereotypical of karate, they are not protected by copyright. After excluding unprotectable elements, such as functional rules and generic scenes related to karate, the court determined that the remainder of the games were not substantially similar. Judge Trott further stated that a 17.5 year old male would not find the games similar, contradicting the finding of the lower court. The appeal ruled that the district court had erred in their analysis, and ordered the injunction to be lifted.

== Effects ==
The case was among several early rulings that applied the scènes à faire principle to video games, and became cited in further cases. In the 1994 case Capcom U.S.A. Inc. v. Data East Corp., Data East found itself defending a claim that their game Fighter's History had violated the copyright in Street Fighter II. Data East responded to Capcom that any similarities between the two games were inherent to the fighting game genre and not protected by copyright, and moreover, Karate Champ was the first game in the genre. Data East successfully defended the claim, ironically by using similar reasoning that had been used against them in Data East v. Epyx. As a result, most lawsuits about alleged video game clones were settled between the mid-1990s through to the mid-2000s.

The Data East v. Epyx case was also cited in Apple Computer, Inc. v. Microsoft Corporation, where the court said that unprotected expression could not support any finding of infringement. Even outside the software industry, Pasillas v. McDonald's Corporation cited the legal principles from Data East v. Epyx to explain that infringement cannot be proved through similarity between standard elements.

== Legacy ==
This case is remembered for building on the legal reasoning in Atari v. Amusement World, where the courts first applied the scènes à faire principle to video games. It's also an early example of the courts dissecting the similarities between two video games, before determining if the similar elements are protected by copyright. At the time, the Santa Clara High Technology Law Journal observed that the decision would provide more clarity about what similarities are considered infringing, bringing video games into conformity with other audio-visual works. The University of Pennsylvania Law Review noted that these early rulings were shaped by the technical constraints of the era, excluding similarities that might result from the limited range of expression in early video game technology.

Contrasting it with later rulings, intellectual property attorney Jack Schecter noted it among early cases where "courts seemed to have a difficult time conceiving of copyright protection that would extend beyond the strict confines of the art and sound assets included in a game." Swatee Mehta noted that the intrinsic-extrinsic test used by the Ninth Circuit almost always led to a finding of non-infringement. John Quagliariello similarly argued that this was one of several cases that made it near impossible for a video game copyright holder to win a lawsuit against a potential infringer, especially considering the cost of a lawsuit versus the risk of an unfavorable ruling. Attorney Stephen C. McArthur mentioned it among several rulings that were permissive of clones, until that pattern changed in 2012.

Legal scholars have determined that the permissive approach to video game clones shifted in 2012, with the rulings in Tetris Holding, LLC v. Xio Interactive, Inc. and Spry Fox, LLC v. Lolapps, Inc. Courts have noted the increased graphical power of modern video game platforms, which opens up new possibilities for artistic expression compared to early cases such as Data East v. Epyx, when it was harder to express an idea in new ways.

== See also ==
- Analytic dissection
- Scènes à faire doctrine
- Substantial similarity
- Idea-expression divide
- Brown Bag Software v. Symantec Corp.
