= Atari v. Amusement World =

1981 legal case

- Court: United States District Court for the District of Maryland
- Full case name: Atari, Inc. v. Amusement World, Inc.
- Decided: November 27, 1981
- Citation: 547 F. Supp. 222 (D. Md. 1981)

Court membership
- Judge sitting: Joseph H. Young

Atari, Inc. v. Amusement World, Inc., 547 F. Supp. 222 (D. Md. Nov. 27, 1981) is a legal case in which the United States District Court for the District of Maryland held that Amusement World's arcade game Meteors did not violate Atari's copyright in their game Asteroids.

Judge Joseph H. Young accepted that Atari had valid copyright protection in their game's symbols, movements, and sounds, but concluded that Amusement World's game did not infringe on any of these protected elements. Although Amusement World admitted that they appropriated Atari's idea, the court determined that this was not prohibited, because copyright only protects the specific expression of an idea, not the idea itself.

This became one of the earliest legal rulings about copyright in video games, and one of the first cases to rule in favor of the defendant based on the idea-expression distinction that copyright does not protect broad ideas, only the unique expression an idea.

== Background ==
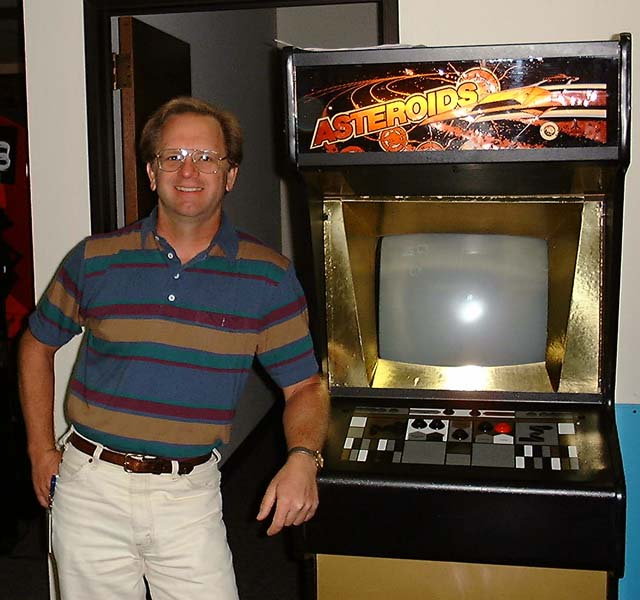
Co-developer Ed Logg standing next to a very rare gold Asteroids arcade cabinet.

Atari, Inc. released Asteroids in November 1979, an arcade game where the player controls a spaceship traveling through rival spaceships and other space debris. Asteroids was an immediate success upon release. It displaced Space Invaders by popularity in the United States and became Atari's best selling arcade game of all time, with over 70,000 units sold. Atari earned an estimated $150 million in sales from the game, and arcade operators earned a further $500 million from coin drops.

Amusement World was a small company of five employees who mainly repaired coin-operated games. Company president Stephen Holniker played Asteroids and felt that he could produce a game to compete in the marketplace. Meteors became Amusement World's first game, which drew the attention of Atari by March 1981. Both games involved dodging and shooting space rocks, but a notable difference was that Meteors featured color graphics. Soon after, Atari filed suit and sought to enjoin Amusement World from manufacturing or distributing Meteors.

== Ruling ==
The motion for injunctive relief was brought to the United States District Court for the District of Maryland and was tried by district court judge Joseph H. Young. The court denied the motion, based on the conclusion that Meteors had not infringed the Asteroids copyright.

Atari alleged that Meteors was substantially similar to Asteroids, and therefore an infringement of their copyright. Amusement World argued that granting Atari a copyright would effectively grant them a monopoly for any game about spaceships and asteroids. Judge Young disagreed with Amusement World for this argument, granting copyright protection to Atari for "the symbols that appear on the display screen, the ways in which those symbols move around the screen, and the sound emanating from the game cabinet". Still, the judge determined that this copyright would not create a monopoly, as anyone could potentially create a game about asteroids, so long as they adopted a different expression of that idea, with different symbols, movements, and sounds.

After finding that Atari owned a valid copyright in their Asteroids game, Judge Young compared it to Meteors and found 22 instances where the games were identical or similar, as well as finding nine differences. The similarities included that both games had exactly three sizes of space rocks, and that the rocks always split into two smaller, faster moving rocks. The controls for the ships were functionally identical, and both games awarded the player an extra life if they scored 10,000 points. The differences included that Meteors was a faster game, with differences in the movement of its rocks, as well as having color graphics compared to the black-and-white Asteroids.

In Judge Young's analysis, he cited the principle of the idea-expression distinction from Mazer v. Stein in 1957, that "while one's expression of an idea is copyrightable, the underlying idea one uses is not." The similarities between the games were determined to be intrinsic to the overall idea of shooting down space rocks with a spaceship, and thus could not be protected by copyright. Calling most of these similarities "inevitable", Judge Young reasoned that the two games were different in terms of their overall feel, due to Meteors being faster, more difficult, and more graphically realistic.

In his concluding remarks, Judge Young explained that Amusement World "based their game on plaintiff's copyrighted game; to put it bluntly, defendants took plaintiff's idea. However, the copyright laws do not prohibit this. Copyright protection is available only for expression of ideas, not for ideas themselves. Defendants used plaintiff's idea and those portions of plaintiff's expression that were inextricably linked to that idea. The remainder of defendants' expression is different from plaintiff's expression." Thus, the court denied Atari's motion for a preliminary injunction, with Amusement World succeeding in their defense.

== Effects ==
This decision was part of the "Atari trilogy" of cases that helped define early video game law, including Atari v. Williams, and Atari, Inc. v. North American Philips Consumer Electronics Corp. Atari, Inc. v. Amusement World was the first copyright case where the court compared the numerous similarities and differences between two video games, as well as the first time that a court applied complex copyright principles to video games, such as the idea-expression distinction and scènes à faire. At the time, it was one of the only cases to rule in favor of the defendant, based on the idea-expression distinction that copyright does not protect broad ideas, only the unique expression. Writing for the Vanderbilt Law Review in 1983, Steven G. McKnight argued that the judge's analysis of game "feel" was inadequate if they did not play the games in question. In the University of Pennsylvania Law Review, Thomas Hemnes argued that the court "blurs the very distinction between idea and expression", highlighting more "particularized" implementations such as the same three sizes of rocks that split into two rocks upon destruction.

== Legacy ==
Intellectual property attorney Stephen McArthur notes that Atari v. Amusement World was the first of nearly a dozen rulings in favor of alleged video game clones, "pav[ing] the way for developers to create games closely resembling established and successful games", with courts only shifting nearly 30 years later in Spry Fox, LLC v. Lolapps, Inc. and Tetris Holding, LLC v. Xio Interactive, Inc. The line between a free idea versus copyrightable expression can be seen by contrasting this case with Tetris v Xio.

Greg Lastowka states that the idea-expression dichotomy established in Asteroids was difficult to apply in the Spry Fox and Tetris Holdings disputes from 2013. He compared the Amusement World case to other early copyright cases, questioning "what made a video game involving spaceships and space rocks an unprotected idea", while contrasting it with the court in Atari, Inc. v. North American Philips Consumer Electronics Corp., which gave copyright protection to Pac-Man's "pie-shaped gobbler and four ghost monsters as a particularized form of expression". Writing in 2018, Tori Allen says this case represents the rudimentary composition of early video games that made it difficult to discern between idea and expression, with video games progressing in their expression to allow more copyrightable game elements.
