= Atomic Runner Chelnov =

1988 video game

- Japanese arcade flyer
- Developers: Data East; Dempa (X68000)
- Publishers: Data East: Genesis; NA/JP: Data East; EU: Sega Dempa (X68000) Paon (Virtual Console)
- Designer: Akira Otani (MD/GEN)
- Programmers: Sōichi Akiyama; Takuya Haga; Takaaki Inoue (Arcade); Kohji Sasamoto (MD/GEN)
- Artists: Jun Sato; Masanori Tokoro; Mix Man; Ritsu T. (Arcade); Mau Yokoi, Mutsunori Sato (MD/GEN)
- Composers: Azusa Hara; Hiroaki Yoshida; Tatsuya Kiuchi; Tenno (Arcade); Masaaki Iwasaki (MD/GEN)
- Platforms: Arcade, Genesis, X68000
- Release: January 1988: Arcade; JP: January 1988; NA: 1988 Genesis; NA: July 1992; JP: 16 October 1992; EU: 1992 X68000; JP: 29 January 1993
- Genres: Platform, scrolling shooter
- Modes: Single-player, multiplayer (not in all versions)
- Arcade system: Karnov-based hardware

Atomic Runner Chelnov (Note: Also known as Atomic Runner Chelnov - Fighting Human Power Plant (Japanese: アトミック ランナー チェルノブ - 戦う人間発電所, Hepburn: Atomikku Ran'nā Cherunobu - Tatakau Ningen Hatsudensho) in Japan and Atomic Runner Chelnov - Nuclear Man, The Fighter in North America.) is an arcade side-scrolling shooter platform video game developed and published by Data East in 1988.

In the game, the player takes the role of Chelnov, a coal miner who miraculously survives the malfunction and explosion of a nuclear power plant. Chelnov's body gains superhuman abilities due to the massive amount of radiation given off by the explosion, and a secret organization seeks to harness those abilities for its own evil purposes. Chelnov must battle and defeat the secret organization using his newfound abilities.

It was ported with a different theme to the Sega Genesis in 1992 by Data East and faithfully to the X68000 in 1993 by Dempa.

== Gameplay ==
Arcade version screenshot

The player controls Chelnov's movements with the eight-way joystick, and the three buttons to attack, jump, or turn around. Six types of weapons can be obtained during the game: laser, fire rings, boomerangs, spike bola balls, spike ball whip, missiles. By collecting power-ups you can improve Chelnov's attack power, rapid-firing capability, attack range or jumping height.

The game is a forced side-scrolling game where the screen continually scrolls to the left at a constant speed unless the player is fighting a boss, in which the screen will stop scrolling. Chelnov will continue to run with the screen even if the player lets go of the joystick. Though the player can move to the left or right of the scrolling screen by entering the corresponding direction on the joystick, it is impossible to stop or move backwards except when fighting a boss (Chelnov can turn backwards while jumping). The main character's sprite animation is highly detailed and smooth for its time, comparable to the level of Karateka and the early Prince of Persia games. The ending screen appears when the player finishes all seven levels of the game.

== Development ==
Atomic Runner Chelnov was controversial at the time of release. The setting, where a coal miner is caught in a nuclear accident, a hammer and sickle visible on the game's opening screen, and the game's title (Chernobyl is written チェルノブイリ in Japanese) led many to interpret the game as a parody of the Chernobyl disaster. Data East responded in a television program that the name "Chelnov" was merely a relative of Karnov, the title character of one of the company's games, and was not at all influenced by the events at Chernobyl. Other development staff members later explained that the game had been planned under a different name, but the events at Chernobyl led to the name "Chelnov", which became the game's title. Under this explanation, the parodic elements resulted purely out of coincidence, but over a year and a half passed from the accident to the first release of the game, which was ample time for the developers to reassess the suitability of the game's plot and content. The game's storyline was changed considerably to remove connotations of Chernobyl when the game was ported to the Sega Mega Drive/Genesis.

After Data East became defunct due to bankruptcy in 2003, Paon bought the rights to Atomic Runner Chelnov.

== Ports ==
The game was first ported to the Sega Genesis in 1992, but many parts of the game were remade. The Japanese version kept the same name as its arcade counterpart, but the North American and European versions were simply titled Atomic Runner. The game's plot was changed completely, where Chelnov is not a coal miner caught in a nuclear meltdown, but a regular human being wearing a special combat suit who battles enemies to rescue his younger sister. The game's enemies and background images were also changed to those reminiscent of an ancient civilization. This version was released for the Wii Virtual Console in Japan on September 11, 2007. It was also released for the Sega Genesis Mini 2 microconsole on October 27, 2022.

The game was released for the X68000 in 1993. This version is almost identical to the original arcade version. The release contained an adapter for the Mega Drive controller, commonly known in Japan as the Chelnov Adapter (チェルノブアダプタ), and allowed the player to use the Mega Drive controller for many other X68000 games besides Chelnov.

A port to the Sega Saturn was planned and developed, but was never released to consumers. A version of it appeared in the Tokyo Game Show and several game stores in Akihabara around 1997, but its release was cancelled by Data East for unknown reasons. A fully playable prototype of the Sega Saturn version was found in 2012. The Saturn prototype is a duplicate of the 1988 arcade game but lacks sound effects, though the music is still present.

== Reception ==
In Japan, Game Machine listed Atomic Runner Chelnov as the thirteenth most successful table arcade unit of February 1988.

== Legacy ==
Chelnov also appears as an enemy character in Trio The Punch, Tumblepop (1991), and Fighter's History: Mizoguchi Kiki Ippatsu!! (1995), and can be seen being transported in a frozen container on a freight train in Bad Dudes Vs. DragonNinja (1988). In Sly Spy (1989), a poster showing Chelnov can be seen at the beginning of Stage 4. He can also be seen in Windjammers 2 (2020), as a member of the crowd on the Ring stage.

== See also ==
- Karnov
- Fighter's History characters
