= Oretachi Gēsen Zoku =

Video game series

オレたちゲーセン族 Oretachi Gēsen Zoku (Our Game Center Family)
- Front cover of Sonic Wings (Oretachi Geesen Zoku series)
- Genre: Various
- Developer: Hamster Corporation
- Publisher: Hamster Corporation
- Platform: PlayStation 2
- First release: July 21, 2005
- Latest release: February 8, 2007

Oretachi Gēsen Zoku (オレたちゲーセン族) is a series of 19 emulated arcade video games developed and published by Hamster Corporation for the PlayStation 2. They were only available in Japan. Of the 19 games, the last two – Thunder Cross (1988) and Trio the Punch (1990) – were previously never released on home platforms.

Each game costs ¥ 2,000 and includes seven items:

- A PlayStation 2 CD-ROM disc with the emulated arcade game.
- A miniDVD with promotional trailers of other Gēsen Zoku titles and a "Masterplay" video (a playthrough played by an expert).
- A Mini CD with the original game soundtrack and arranged versions (remixes by group Super Sweep).
- Instructions booklet with information about the original Arcade PCB.
- Official mini strategy guide book (with game information, tactics and advice).
- Replica display card
- Collection card (reproducing the original arcade flyer).

== Released titles ==
Titles in the Oretachi Geesen Zoku series
Volume	Title	Developer	Original release	Release date
1	Scramble	Konami	1981	July 21, 2005
2	Crazy Climber	Nichibutsu	1980	July 21, 2005
3	Karate Champ	Data East	1984	July 21, 2005
4	Time Pilot	Konami	1982	July 21, 2005
5	Moon Cresta	Nichibutsu	1980	July 21, 2005
6	Sonic Wings	Video System	1992	July 21, 2005
7	BurgerTime	Data East	1982	October 27, 2005
8	Yie Ar Kung-Fu	Konami	1985	October 27, 2005
9	Super Volleyball	Video System	1989	October 27, 2005
10	Terra Cresta	Nichibutsu	1985	October 27, 2005
11	Quarth	Konami	1989	January 26, 2006
12	Nekketsu Kouha Kunio-Kun	Technōs Japan	1986	January 26, 2006
13	Nekketsu Koukou Dodgeball-bu	Technōs Japan	1987	March 23, 2006
14	Rabio Lepus	Video System	1987	March 23, 2006
15	Akumajō Dracula	Konami	1988	May 25, 2006
16	Contra	Konami	1987	May 25, 2006
17	Pooyan	Konami	1982	May 25, 2006
18	Thunder Cross	Konami	1988	February 8, 2007
19	Trio the Punch	Data East	1990	February 8, 2007

== See also ==
- Arcade Archives
