= Fighter's History =

- Genre: Fighting
- Developer: Data East
- Publisher: Data East
- First release: Fighter's History; March 1993
- Latest release: Fighter's History: Mizoguchi Kiki Ippatsu!! February 17, 1995
- Spin-offs: Garou Densetsu vs. Fighter's History Dynamite

Fighter's History (Note: Japanese: ファイターズヒストリー, Hepburn: Faitāzu Hisutorī) is a series of fighting games that were produced by Data East during the 1990s. The original Fighter's History was first released for the arcades in 1993 and ported to the Super Nintendo Entertainment System in 1994. Two different sequels were produced: Karnov's Revenge (aka Fighter's History Dynamite in Japan) for the Neo Geo in 1994, followed by Fighter's History: Mizoguchi Kiki Ippatsu!!, released in Japan for the Super Famicom in 1995.

The main unique feature of the Fighter's History series is its "weak point system". By repeatedly hitting an opponent's weak point, the player can temporarily stun them once per round, leaving the opponent open for an attack. The location of an opponent's weak spot varies with each character and is usually represented by a specific article of clothing (e.g. a headband, a vest, a mask).

== Games ==
Release timeline
1993	Fighter's History
1994	Karnov's Revenge
1995	Fighter's History: Mizoguchi Kiki Ippatsu!!
1996–2006
2007	Garou Densetsu vs. Fighter's History Dynamite

=== Fighter's History ===
The original Fighter's History was released as an arcade game in March 1993. The game uses a six-button control configuration similar to Street Fighter II, with three punch buttons and three kick buttons, each for different strength levels (light, medium, and heavy). There are a total of nine playable characters, as well as two non-playable boss characters at the end of the single-player tournament. The final boss and sponsor of the tournament is revealed to be Karnov, the protagonist of the Data East action game of the same name. In this installment hitting an opponent's weak point will not only stun the opponent, it will also cause the opponent to sustain greater damage when the weak point is repeatedly struck afterward. Fighter's History was made available through Nintendo Switch Online in 2022.

=== Karnov's Revenge ===
Karnov's Revenge, also titled Fighter's History Dynamite in Japan and in the USA arcade version, was released for the arcades March 17, 1994. Due to change of hardware to SNK's MVS platform, the control configuration was reduced from six attack buttons to just four (only light and heavy attacks are available this time). Likewise, the game was released for the Neo Geo home console, as well as the Neo Geo CD, on April 28.

A new gameplay feature is introduced in the form of "one-two attacks". When the player presses a heavy attack button while performing a light attack or blocking, the interval between light attacks is reduced, making combos easier to perform. All eleven fighters from the previous game return (including the bosses Clown and Karnov, who are now playable) and are joined by two new characters: Yungmie, a female taekwondo exponent from Korea, and Zazie, a karate practitioner from Kenya, for a total of 13 characters. Karnov is the only returning character who was given entirely new sprites. Most of the returning characters were given new special techniques (with a few exceptions), including hidden techniques which are not listed on the instruction card (the manual for the home version hints of their inclusion).

=== Fighter's History: Mizoguchi Kiki Ippatsu!! ===
Fighter's History: Mizoguchi Kiki Ippatsu!! ("Mizoguchi's Moment of Crisis!!") was released in Japan for the Super Famicom on February 17, 1995. Based on Karnov's Revenge, many changes were made to the game, including the addition of a new game mode where Mizoguchi is the protagonist. In addition to the story-based Mizoguchi Mode, there are also three new game modes (Practice, Tag Battle, and Survival) in addition to the traditional CPU Battle and 2-Player Versus Modes. There are nine playable characters in this installment, as five of the characters from the previous Fighter's History games were cut from the roster (Ray, Jean, Matlock, Samchay, and Marstorius). Chelnov, the main character from Data East's arcade game Atomic Runner Chelnov, appears in this game as the final boss.

== Characters ==
- (United States) Ray McDougal (レイ・マクドガル, Rei Makudogaru) – the lead character in the first two games, he is a detective from Los Angeles with a unique fighting style.
- (Japan) Makoto Mizoguchi (溝口 誠, Mizoguchi Makoto) – a high school delinquent from Osaka who is in his late 20s after being held back repeatedly for many years. He is the most prominent character in the series, having appeared in several games outside the Fighter's History franchise, including SNK's KOF: Maximum Impact Regulation A.
- (China) Liu Feilin (劉 飛鈴, Ryu Feirin, Chinese Pinyin: Liú Fēilíng) – a top actress in the Chinese classical opera world, she is also a master of the Chinese murderer's fist, which appears to be Praying Mantis Kung Fu. Feilin appears as a playable character in the remake version of Night Slashers, where her backstory reveals her status as the victor of the two Great Grapple tournaments.
- (Japan) Ryoko Kano (嘉納 亮子, Kanō Ryōko) – a Japanese high school girl who learned judō from her grandfather since the age of 3.
- (United Kingdom) Matlok Jade (マットロック・ジェイド, Mattorokku Jeido) – a punk rock guitarist from England who seeks a legendary guitar.
- Samchay Tomyamgun (サムチャイ・トムヤムクン, Samuchai Tomuyamukun) – a muay Thai fighter from Thailand who seeks to support his younger siblings in the absence of his parents.
- (China) Lee Diendou (李 典徳, Rii Diendō, Chinese Pinyin: Lǐ Diǎndé) – a Chinese Bajiquan exponent who participates in the Great Grapple in order to seek the mysterious warrior who killed his father Gentoku (厳徳).
- (France) Jean Pierre (ジャン・ピエール, Jan Piēru) – a French gymnast who has always achieved perfect scores until the day he scored a 9.98. Since then, he began picking martial arts in order to improve his grace and strength. He participates in the tournament in order to see the results of his training.
- Marstorius (マーストリウス, Māsutoriusu) – a professional wrestler from Italy in his 40s who believes that wrestling is the strongest martial art. In the versus screen of Karnov's Revenge, his name is misspelt as Marstrius.
- Clown (クラウン, Kuraun) – the sub-boss in the first game. Like his name suggests, he is a clown from a traveling circus who fights with his quick agility as a circus performer. His special moves include a rolling attack and card throws. In Karnov's Revenge, he forms his own circus called "Clown's Circus" and participates in the second tournament to become stronger than Karnov, as well as to find an "attractive male fighter". In the Japanese version of the series, Clown is depicted as a homosexual who is attracted to younger men. While the English localization of the first two games removed all references of Clown's sexuality in the game, the manual for the Neo Geo home version still mentions his preferences for men.
- (Russia) Karnov (カルノフ, Karunofu) (Карнов) – the main boss in the first two games, originally a character from a previous Data East game of the same name. The second son of a poor Russian farmer, his full name is Jinborov Karnovski. He earned his reputation as a brawling ruffian at a young age by picking fights at neighboring places. He was forced to become a servant of God in the past as punishment for his past behavior, but has since renounced the heavens in order to host his own martial arts tournament, where he is the undefeated champion. After losing in the first game, he hosts the second tournament in Karnov's Revenge in order to seek revenge for his defeat. In Mizoguchi Kiki Ippatsu!, Karnov leaves the heavens from his retirement in order to defeat the people mocking him.
- Zazie Muhaba (ザジィ・ムハバ, Zajii Muhaba) – one of the new characters introduced in Karnov's Revenge. A nature-loving practitioner of the Hokutō Shinkan Karate (北東真館空手) style from Kenya, he participates in the Great Grapple tournament in order to fund his self-made environmentalist organization and protect the African wildlife from poachers.
- (South Korea) Liu Yungmie (柳 英美, Japanese: Ryū Yonmī, Korean: Ryu Yeongmi) – the other new character introduced in Karnov's Revenge. A young female taekwondo practitioner from Korea whose parents were both top-class martial artists, she participates in the Great Grapple in order to investigate her parents' disappearance. When she defeats Karnov, she is told that her father committed suicide after losing to Karnov and that her mother disappeared afterward. In Mizoguchi Kiki Ippatsu!, she participates in Chelnov's Great Grapple tournament in order to face her rival Feilin. In her ending in Mizoguchi Kiki Ippatsu!, she becomes a tour guide who travels the world.
- Ox (オックス, Okkusu) – a hidden final opponent in Karnov's Revenge, he is based on the ox that players faced in the early Data East fighting game Karate Champ.
- (Russia) Chelnov (チェルノブ, Cherunobu) (Челнов) – the final boss exclusive to Mizoguchi Kiki Ippatsu!. The organizer of the "Last Great Grapple tournament", Chelnov wears a strange suit that conceals his true face. It is said that he was a former Russian scientist who was involved in a huge accident that almost killed him. Chelnov was originally the title character of a Data East arcade game of the same name.

== Related releases ==
=== Soundtracks ===
All three titles in the series had their soundtracks published on CD albums exclusively in Japan. The original arcade version of the original Fighter's History soundtrack was released by Pony Canyon and Scitron Label on June 18, 1993, while the SNES version's soundtrack was released by Project EGG on July 19, 2011, which can be downloaded on the official Project EGG website. On March 18, 1994, the soundtrack of the Neo Geo MVS / Neo Geo AES version of Karnov's Revenge was added with the Neo Geo MVS / Neo Geo AES soundtrack of Windjammers (known in Japan as Flying Power Disc) by Pony Canyon and Scitron Label in an album titled Fighter's History Dynamite / Flying Power Disc. This album features two exclusive arranged versions of "DYNAMITE" (from Karnov's Revenge) (Arrange Version begins) and "SHOOOT!!" (from Windjammers). Project EGG published the soundtrack of the Neo Geo MVS / Neo Geo AES version of Karnov's Revenge on July 26, 2011, alone without the arranged version of "DYNAMITE", which like their other soundtrack, also can be downloaded on the official Project EGG website. On August 26, 2005, Insanity Naked Hunter Co., Ltd. published the same version Project EGG published, but exclusively as a CD album. On March 19, 1995, Pony Canyon and Scitron Label published the soundtracks of the Neo Geo CD version of Karnov's Revenge and Fighter's History: Mizoguchi Kiki Ippatsu!! both in the album titled Fighter's History Dynamite NEO-GEO CD & Mizoguchi Kiki Ippatsu!!.

=== Other appearances in media ===
A crossover game with the Fatal Fury series, Garou Densetsu vs. Fighter's History Dynamite, was released on 27 July 2000 for mobile phones.

Outside of the Fighter's History series, Makoto Mizoguchi became prominent when he appeared in several other video games. He appeared in the Sega Saturn and PlayStation versions of Data East's 1995 Water Margin-based fighting arcade game, Outlaws Of The Lost Dynasty as an extra character. The Sega Saturn version is known outside Japan as Dark Legend. He and Liu Yungmie later appeared in its Japan-exclusive semi-sequel, titled Suiko Enbu: Fuuun Saiki. Five years after Data East went out of business while giving their video game rights to G-Mode, Paon, WorkJam and Crea-tech, SNK Playmore signed a deal with G-Mode to use their characters from the Fighter's History series in two SNK Playmore titles. Makoto Mizoguchi became the only character from the Fighter's History series that appeared as a special guest character in an upgrade to KOF: Maximum Impact 2 titled KOF: Maximum Impact Regulation A, to promote the Japan-exclusive cell phone game specifically featuring the cast of Fatal Fury Special and Karnov's Revenge titled Garou Densetsu vs. Fighter's History Dynamite. Makoto Mizoguchi also appeared in Joe & Mac Returns as one of the enemies in the game, and as a hidden character in Kenka Bancho: Badass Rumble. In the 1998 film The Replacement Killers, a Fighter's History arcade cabinet appears along with several other arcade cabinets. Liu Feilin was added in Night Slashers: Remake.

== See also ==
- Capcom U.S.A. Inc. v. Data East Corp.
- Data East USA, Inc. v. Epyx, Inc.
