= Fighter's History: Mizoguchi Kiki Ippatsu!! =

1995 fighting video game

- Developer: Data East
- Publisher: Data East
- Series: Fighter's History
- Platform: SNES
- Release: JP: February 17, 1995
- Genre: Fighting
- Mode: Up to 2 players

Fighter's History: Mizoguchi Kiki Ippatsu!! (Note: Fighter's History: Mizoguchi Kiki Ippatsu!! (ファイターズヒストリー 〜溝口危機一髪!!〜, Faitāzu Hisutorī: Mizoguchi Kiki Ippatsu!!; "Mizoguchi's Moment of Crisis!!")) is a 1995 fighting game developed and published by Data East for the Super Famicom. It is the third game in the Fighter's History series, and the last one published by Data East. The gameplay system is largely unchanged from its predecessor, Karnov's Revenge, but a few new additions made it to the game, including a new game mode where Mizoguchi is the protagonist, and the new character Chelnov, the hero of Data East's action game Atomic Runner Chelnov.

The game was initially released only in Japan for the Super Famicom on February 17, 1995. In 2017, Retro-Bit published the game for the international release as part of their compilation Data East Classic Collection.

== Gameplay ==
The gameplay system is largely the same as Karnov's Revenge. Using the 4-button control configuration, striking an opponent's weak point will temporarily stun the opponent, and cause the opponent to sustain greater damage when it's hit afterward. In addition to the story-based Mizoguchi Mode (which revolves around Mizoguchi traveling the world in an attempt to retrieve the stolen giant octopus statue decorating the Naniwa Ichiban restaurant in Osaka), there are also three new game modes (Practice, Tag Battle, and Survival) in addition to the traditional CPU Battle and 2-Player Versus Modes.

There are nine playable characters in this installment, as five of the characters from the previous Fighter's History games were cut from the roster (Ray, Jean, Matlok, Samchay, and Marstorius). Chelnov, the main character from Data East's arcade game Atomic Runner Chelnov, appears in this game as the final boss, as well as a hidden character playable via a code. Ray, Jean and Marstorius, while not playable, appear during the story sequences of the Mizoguchi Mode.

Like the Saturn version of Karnov's Revenge, the player can assign all four basic attacks into a single button (R by default). The Practice Mode is a tutorial that teaches players how to perform various combos with each character. By completing all of the exercises given, the player is taught how to perform a new special technique for their character.

== Release ==
Fighter's History: Mizoguchi Kiki Ippatsu!! was initially released only in Japan for the Super Famicom on February 17, 1995. Retro-Bit later published the game for the international release in 2017, as part of its compilation Data East Classic Collection, which also includes the SNES port of the first game. In this version, the game is listed as "Fighter's History 2".

== Reception ==
Reception

Review score
| Publication | Score |
|---|---|
| Famitsu | 25/40 (SNES) |

On release, Famitsu magazine scored Mizoguchi Kiki Ippatsu a 25 out of 40. Chris Shive from Hardcore Gamer took a detailed look at the game in his Data East Classic Collection review, remarking the graphics have seen a small improvement over [the SNES version of Fighter's History] though the gameplay remains unchanged.
