= Night Slashers =

1993 video game

- Japanese arcade flyer of Night Slashers
- Developers: Original; Data East; Remake; Storm Trident
- Publishers: Original; Data East; Remake; Forever Entertainment
- Designers: Tōru Kikuchi; Shingo Mitsui & Takanori Hasumi (hardware)
- Programmers: Sōichi Akiyama; Yasuhiro Matsumoto; Akitsu Matsuda
- Artists: Masayuki Inoshita; Hitomi Hashimoto; Makoto Nozu; Jirou Ishii; Asami Kaneko; Tomoyuki Arakawa; Fujimi Ōnishi; Yoshinari Kaiho; Hiroshi Tamawashi; Yuuko Nakagawa; Mario Watanabe
- Composer: Tomoyoshi Sato
- Platforms: Arcade, Nintendo Switch, PlayStation 4, Xbox One, Microsoft Windows
- Release: Original; 1993; Remake; September 26, 2024
- Genre: Beat 'em up
- Modes: Single-player, multiplayer

Night Slashers (ナイトスラッシャーズ) is a 1993 beat 'em up game developed and published by Data East for arcades. A remake for major platforms (PlayStation 4, Xbox One, Nintendo Switch and Microsoft Windows) was licensed to Forever Entertainment, developed by Storm Trident, and released in September 2024.

A Nintendo Switch port of original arcade was previously made available under Johnny Turbo's Arcade from 2018 until 2023 prior to remake's release.

== Gameplay ==
Night Slashers is similar to Capcom's Final Fight and Sega's Streets of Rage series, which is an archetypal side scrolling beat 'em up game. One, two or three players/characters move from left to right through each level (most of which are split into three or more scenes), fighting with the enemy characters who appear, until they reach a confrontation with a stronger boss character at the end of the level. Once that boss is beaten, the players automatically move on to the next stage. Enemies appear from both sides of the screen and from out of doorways or entrances set into the background, and the player(s) must defeat all of them to progress. If the players try to simply travel through the levels without fighting, the screen will stop scrolling until all current enemies have been defeated, before allowing the players to continue progress. Enemies may move outside the confines of the screen, but players may not. There is a time limit to each stage.

Unlike Final Fight, Night Slashers features three characters with larger move sets (including "smart bomb" or "screen zapper" type moves) and a horror theme. During the course of the game, players fight through hordes of attacking zombies and mutants, as well as other monsters such as vampires, werewolves and elementals. Bosses also include monsters such as a mummy, a golem, a mad scientist, and lookalikes of Count Dracula, Death the Grim Reaper and Frankenstein's monster. Players fight these enemies and bosses to stop the evil plans of King Zarutz from turning our planet into a worldwide kingdom for the dead. What separates this game from other beat'em ups is that the enemies' names are never listed on their health bars when fighting them.

In the Japanese version, the blood and gore is uncensored (red blood instead of green, but in the overseas version, there is an option to adjust the blood color and the violence level). At the end of a melee attack, Christopher holds out a cross instead of a blue crystal ball. The "Go" arrow flips over to read "To Hell!" in blood. There are extra pictures and dialogue in the cutscenes.

== Characters ==
The player(s) play the role of one of three heroes (or four, in the remake). Each has different strengths and weaknesses, as well as different elemental powers. The game also has different endings, one for each character.

- Jake Hunter (ジェーク・ハンター) - an American monster hunter with cybernetic arms. Nicknamed the "Psychic Cyborg", he is the most powerful character. His element is lightning. Jake sometimes dons a red jacket when traveling.
- Christopher Smith (クリストファー・スミス) - an English vampire hunter and martial artist, he is the most balanced character with an average in speed and power. His elements are water and ice. Christopher sometimes dons a brown coat and hat when traveling.
- Hong Hua Zhao (趙.紅華) - a Chinese martial artist, proficient with mystic arts. Although small compared to the other characters, she is the most agile. Her element is fire. Hong Hua sometimes dons a yellow oriental robe when traveling.
- Liu Feilin (劉 飛鈴) – a top actress in the Chinese classical opera world, she is also a master of the Chinese murderer's fist, which appears to be Praying Mantis Kung Fu. Feilin is an exclusive character introduced in the remake version and originally hails from the fighting game series Fighter's History.

== Reception ==
In Japan, Game Machine listed Night Slashers on their October 15, 1993 issue as being the ninth most-successful table arcade unit of the month. In North America, Play Meter also listed the title to be the fifty-eighth most-popular arcade game at the time.

It was ranked as the 20th top beat 'em up video game of all time by Heavy.com in 2013. Hardcore Gaming 101 said: "Night Slashers is decent but not amazing – any of Capcom's beat-em-ups like Alien vs. Predator or Battle Circuit are a bit better. What makes it special, though, is the campy horror theme, along with some memorable music".
