= International Karate 2000 =

2000 video game

- Developer: Studio 3 Interactive Entertainment
- Platform: Game Boy Color
- Release: November 17 2000
- Genre: Fighting
- Mode: Single-player

International Karate 2000 is a 2000 video game developed by Studio 3 Interactive Entertainment. The game is a handheld sequel to the original title, International Karate. Upon release, the game received generally positive reviews.

== Gameplay ==
Gameplay screenshot

The objective of the game is to win a series of fights in a tournament of 28 competitors across 12 international locations, such as Egyptian pyramids or the Sydney Opera House. As players progress through the tournament, they increase their dan rank towards being awarded a black belt. Players select one of 12 fighters, each with a favored move or fighting style, and fight competitors using kicks and punches, with the directional keys determining the direction of moves, such as high or low kicks. Rounds are won featuring a points system, with the fighter that earns three points in a round winning the match. The game also features bonus rounds between matches, which require players to defend themselves from bouncing balls by using their shield.

== Reception ==
Reception

Review scores
Publication	Score
Computer and Video Games	4/5
Eurogamer	9/10

Several critics considered the game was a worthy successor to the original title. Computer and Video Games commended the game's "beautifully-drawn" backdrops and gameplay, stating it "offers much more of a mental challenge than other handheld fighters". Eurogamer praised the game for its "superb graphics, hard hitting sounds and gameplay straight from the old school of gaming", later naming the title the best Game Boy Color game of 2000, highlighting its "inspired" variation of competitors and battles.
