= Fighter's History (video game) =

1993 video game

- European arcade flyer
- Developer: Data East
- Publisher: Data East
- Producers: Hideo Fukuda; Yukihiro Kawai; Masato Noguchi
- Composers: Hiroaki Yoshida; Mihoko Ando
- Series: Fighter's History
- Platforms: Arcade, Super Nintendo Entertainment System
- Release: Arcade: JP: March 1993; NA: October 1993; SNES: JP: May 27, 1994; NA: August 1994
- Genre: Fighting
- Modes: Single-player, multiplayer

Fighter's History (Note: Fighter's History (Japanese: ファイターズヒストリー, Hepburn: Faitāzu Hisutorī)) is a 1993 fighting game developed and published by Data East for arcades. It is the first installment in the Fighter's History series. The main unique feature of the Fighter's History is its weak point system, which allows the player to temporarily stun an opponent by repeatedly hitting their weak point.

Fighter's History was the subject of a lawsuit against Data East by Capcom, who claimed the game infringed on the copyright of its game Street Fighter II. The case was found in Data East's favor, as the court found that the copied elements were scènes à faire, elements necessary for depicting the scenario. Fighter's History was ported to the Super Nintendo Entertainment System in 1994, and followed by a sequel, Karnov's Revenge, for the Neo Geo.

== Gameplay ==
Ray McDougal performing the "Wheel Kick" against Makoto Mizoguchi.

Fighter's History uses a six-button control configuration similar to Street Fighter II and its iterations, with three punch buttons and three kick buttons, each for different strength levels (light, medium, and heavy). There are a total of nine playable characters, as well as two non-playable boss characters at the end of the single-player tournament. The final boss and sponsor of the tournament is revealed to be Karnov, the protagonist of the Data East action game of the same name.

The main unique feature Fighter's History is its "weak point system". By repeatedly hitting an opponent's weak point, the player can temporarily stun them once per round, leaving the opponent open for an attack. The location of an opponent's weak spot varies with each character and is usually represented by a specific article of clothing (i.e.: a headband, a vest, a mask). After an opponent's weak point is exposed, hitting it will also cause the opponent to sustain greater damage when the weak point is repeatedly struck afterward.

== Release ==
Fighter's History was first released for the arcades in 1993. The game was ported to the Super NES in Japan on May 27, 1994, and later published for North America on August of the same year. The two boss characters, Karnov and Clown, are both playable in the home version through the use of a code.

The SNES version later got a digital re-release for Windows-based online store Project EGG on July 19, 2011 only in Japan. In 2017, the same version received a physical cartridge re-print by Retro Bit in part of a compilation Data East Classic Collection, which also includes the SNES-only sequel Fighter's History: Mizoguchi Kiki Ippatsu!!.

The SNES version was made available for the Nintendo Classics service on July 21, 2022.

== Reception ==
Reception

Review score
Publication	Score
Electronic Gaming Monthly	8/10, 7/10, 6/10, 6/10 (SNES)

In Japan, Game Machine listed Fighter's History on their May 1, 1993 issue as being the second most-successful table arcade unit of the month. Play Meter listed Fighter's History to be the twenty-seventh most-popular arcade game at the time.

Electronic Gaming Monthly reviewers commented that the graphics are average, but praised the controls as exceptional for a fighting game. Nintendo Power wasn't impressed with the SNES version, stating that the lack of originality fails to make Fighter's History stand out from other games, and criticized the poor sound. GamePro gave the SNES version a negative review, calling the game "an unremarkable [Street Fighter] knock-off with solid but slow game play", and heavily criticizing the "bland" character design.

Chris Shive of Hardcore Gamer called the SNES version as "[a] bootleg Street Fighter II" in his Data East Classic Collection review. The reviewer was unimpressed with the core gameplay that doesn't much differ from other contemporary fighting games, although he added that the game is quite fun nonetheless.

== Lawsuit ==
At the time of the game's release, Capcom U.S.A. sued Data East Corp. over Fighter's History due to what Capcom U.S.A. felt were infringements on its Street Fighter II property. Capcom also filed similar claims against Data East in Japan. Data East Corp.'s largest objection in court was that their 1984 arcade game Karate Champ was the true originator of the competitive fighting game genre, which predated the original Street Fighter by three years. Judge Orrick set an October 31, 1994 trial date, stating that he could not deny "the strong evidence that it set out to copy Street Fighter's success", noting similarities such as a "Chun-Li clone" (referring to Feilin) and several comparable special moves, but Capcom U.S.A. lost the case on grounds that the copied elements were scènes à faire and thus excluded from copyright.
