= Block Hole =

1989 video game

- Arcade flyer
- Developer: Konami
- Publisher: Konami
- Composer: Norio Hanzawa
- Platforms: Arcade, MSX2, NEC PC-9801, X68000, Famicom, Game Boy
- Release: Arcade: JP: October 9, 1989; WW: 1989; MSX2: JP: March 9, 1990; Game Boy: JP: March 16, 1990; NA: December 1990; Famicom: JP: April 13, 1990
- Genre: Puzzle

Block Hole, released in Japan as Quarth (Note: Japanese: クォース, Hepburn: Kwōsu), is a 1989 puzzle video game developed and published by Konami for arcades. It was released in Japan on October 9, 1989 and internationally the same year. It was ported to the MSX2, Famicom and Game Boy as Quarth, with the exception of the European Game Boy Color release of Konami GB Collection Vol.2, where the game was renamed to the generic title Block Game for unknown reasons.

A sequel, Block Quarth, released on the Konami Net i-mode service, with an updated Block Quarth DX in 2001. It was released internationally without the "DX" suffix in 2005.

== Gameplay ==
Quarth on the MSX

Block Hole is a combination of Tetris-style gameplay and a fixed shooter in the Space Invaders tradition. The player's focus is on falling blocks, and the action is geometrical. Rather than arranging the blocks together to make a row of disappearing blocks, a spaceship positioned at the bottom of the screen shoots blocks upwards to make the falling block pattern into squares or rectangles. Once the blocks have been arranged properly, the shape is destroyed and the player is awarded points based on the shape's size. The blocks continue to drop from the top of the screen in various incomplete shapes. As each level progresses, the blocks drop at greater speed and frequency. There are also various power-ups which could be located to increase ship's speed, among other bonuses. The game continues until the blocks reach the dotted line at the bottom of the screen, whereupon the player's ship will be destroyed.

=== Multiplayer ===
The arcade, MSX2, and Famicom versions had two different 2-player modes: a split-screen mode with Player 1 on the left and Player 2 on the right, and a cooperative mode where both players shared the same screen.

For the Game Boy, multiplayer requires the Game Link Cable with each player able to view only their fields on their own Game Boys.

== Reception ==
In Japan, Game Machine listed Quarth on their December 1, 1989 issue as being the third most-successful table arcade unit of the month. Block Hole was a hit overseas in Europe, particularly the United Kingdom and Italy.

Philip J Reed of Nintendo Life gave the Game Boy version a 6/10 score, praising its fun gameplay but criticizing its repetitive nature.

== Re-releases ==
In 2005, Konami included the game in the Nintendo DS title Ganbare Goemon: Tōkaidōchū Ōedo Tengurikaeshi no Maki. An emulated version of the game was released by Hamster Corporation in 2006 for the PlayStation 2 as part of the Oretachi Gēsen Zoku series. Hamster also released the game as part of their Arcade Archives series for the Nintendo Switch and PlayStation 4 in 2021. The MSX version was released for the Virtual Console service for the Wii and Wii U while the Game Boy version was released on the Nintendo 3DS version of the service.
