= Karate Champ =

1984 video game

- Developer: Data East
- Publisher: Data East
- Platforms: Arcade, Apple II, Commodore 64, Nintendo Entertainment System, Famicom Disk System, iOS
- Release: Arcade: JP: May 1984; WW: September 1984; Apple II, C64: NA: October 1985; NES: NA: December 1986; FDS: JP: July 22, 1988
- Genre: Fighting
- Modes: Single-player, multiplayer

Karate Champ (Note: Japanese: カラテ・チャンプ, Hepburn: Karate Chanpu) (Note: Also known in Japan as Karate-dō (空手道, lit. Way of the Empty Hand)) is a 1984 fighting game developed and published by Data East for arcades. The player utilizes dual-joystick controls to input various moves, in order to defeat enemies in a best-of-three matches format. The game was commercially successful, especially in the United States where it was the highest-grossing arcade game of 1985 and the best-selling home computer game up until 1989. It established and popularized the one-on-one fighting game genre, for which it is considered one of the most influential games of all time.

An updated version that allows two players the option to compete against each other was released in 1984 under the title Karate Champ — Player vs Player, (Note: Known in Japan as Taisen Karate Dō: Bishōjo Seishun Hen (対戦空手道 美少女青春編, lit. The Competitive Way of the Empty Hand: Pretty Maiden Edition)) featuring a multiplayer mode and more varied gameplay. It was released for the arcades shortly after the original during the same year, also published by Data East. This version was released internationally as Karate Champ (the original single-player version was exclusive to Japan), and would serve as the basis for the home versions of Karate Champ.

== Gameplay ==
A fight in progress

Using two joysticks, players can execute 24 moves. Gameplay consists of a two dimensional fight between the first karateka wearing a white gi who is controlled by player one and the second karateka wearing a red gi who is controlled by either player two or the CPU, followed by various bonus rounds for the successful player. This pattern repeats itself in the next, more challenging round set against a new background, the first level being a dojo and all following levels taking place at the same tournament stadium.

Unlike most later fighting games, there is no health bar or hit point system. A hit successfully landed ends the round and earns the hitter either one point or half point (along with a numeric score for the top ten, but this has no effect on winning a match). The first to score two points is the winner. If the player loses a battle, the game ends. The game features digitized speech for the judge to call out such phrases as "Half point" or "Full point". The speech is in Japanese in the original version.

=== Player vs Player ===
Karate Champ — Player vs Player is distinguished from the initial Karate Champ by the addition of a player versus player mode. It is very similar to the original in the sense that they use the same hardware, improved speech, some new sprites and title screen, and the gameplay mechanics are basically the same.

Player vs Player has the characters fighting it out over girls in twelve different locations around the world (similar to the later SNK's Street Smart). A scene runs as a best out of three rounds competition for one girl. After every competition, the player has a chance to earn bonus points by evading a series of potted plants flying at the player, kicking through a series of boards and stopping a charging bull. The locations of the game are: A harbor, a garden with a view of Mount Fuji, a bamboo forest, on a tree trunk over a chasm, on the stern of a Japanese registered ship, on the side of a road or runway, Holland with windmills, a big city, a North American desert with Indian tipis, a Japanese garden, a dojo, and finally a forest path at night. Afterwards, the game returns to the first scene for a second loop. Completing all 12 scenes again completes the game.

== Versions and re-releases ==
Karate Champ was converted to the Apple II and the Commodore 64 by Berkeley Softworks. Data East began publishing the home versions in the USA on October 12, 1985. The NES version was released in North America in December 1986. Like the home computer versions, the NES conversion was inspired by the Player vs. Player edition of the arcade game. This version was later released in Japan for the Famicom Disk System on July 22, 1988, but never made it to the cartridge-based Famicom. Data East published this version of the game, both in North America and Japan.

An emulation of the arcade version was released by Hamster Corporation for the PlayStation 2 as part of its Oretachi Geasen Zoku Sono lineup. Only the original game was included (the Player vs. Player version being ignored from the compilation). Hamster Corporation released the original version as part of their Arcade Archives series for the PlayStation 4 in 2015 and the Nintendo Switch in 2019, as well as the NES version as part of their Console Archives series for the Nintendo Switch 2 and PlayStation 5 in September 2026.

In 2010, it was released on iOS by developer Revolutionary Concepts. Although visually identical to the 1984 arcade edition of Karate Champ — Player vs Player, the iPhone version is actually a remake rather than an emulation, as it includes new features such as a difficulty mode as well as the ability for players to compete through a gaming network via Bluetooth or Wi-Fi. The game was also released for the iPad under the title Karate Champ XL, again developed by Revolutionary Concepts. Karate Champ XL is basically the same game as the iPhone's Karate Champ, but with additional attributes over its phone counterpart such as a split-screen option.

The arcade version and the NES version were released in 2018 by Dreamgear LLC under its "My Arcade" brand. The arcade version of Karate Champ is part of a compilation released in the shape of a mini arcade cabinet featuring 34 Data East games. The NES version was released both as a standalone mini arcade cabinet and in a handheld device that includes 300 built-in games. In the case of the NES version, the referee's digital voice was removed and the music tracks were replaced. The arcade version is unedited. Since My Arcade's releases are single-player only, the two-player mode was removed from the NES version, and the Karate Champ — Player vs Player edition was not included in the compilation of 34 arcade games.

The NES version was re-released as part of the "Data East Collection 1" set for the Evercade handheld console.

In late 2024, Karate Champ returned in a fighting compilation for the Polymega which includes both 1984 arcade versions as well as the NES and FDS ports, and two games of the Fighter's History trilogy.

== Reception ==
=== Arcade ===
Karate Champ was a commercial blockbuster, selling 10,000 arcade cabinets within two months of release and becoming Data East's best-selling arcade game of all time. In Japan, Game Machine listed Karate Champ on their August 1, 1984 issue as being the second-most-successful table arcade unit of the month, before becoming the top-grossing table arcade cabinet by August 15, 1984. Game Machine also listed Karate Champ — Player vs Player on their November 1, 1984 issue as being the sixth-most-successful table arcade unit of the month.

In North America, it was among the most successful arcade games in 1984, generating significant sales. In the United States, Karate Champ had shipped 30,000 arcade units by April 1985. It was the top-grossing arcade game during Summer 1985, and the fourth-top-grossing upright arcade cabinet on the monthly RePlay charts in November 1985, when each cabinet was selling for about $2,400 and earning an average coin drop revenue of $200 per week. It ended the year as the highest-grossing arcade game of 1985, and the year's highest-grossing game in route/street locations. In 1995, Flux magazine ranked the game 91st on their "Top 100 Video Games" list.

=== Home computers ===
On home computers in the United States, Data East's Karate Champ floppy disk received a "Gold Award" from the Software Publishers Association (SPA) in July 1987 for sales above 100,000 units, then a "Platinum Award" for over 250,000 sales in February 1988, and then a "Diamond Award" for sales above 500,000 units in January 1989. It was the first game to receive the "Diamond Award" from the SPA, and it was one of the top two best-selling computer games in the United States (along with Where in the World Is Carmen Sandiego?) up until June 1989.

Rick Teverbaugh reviewed the home computer version for Computer Gaming World, stating the game is "fast-paced" and "the graphics are very good" but "my only complaint is that some of the in-match options are counters for a move of your opponent, but there often isn't any time for those reactions". Ahoy! opined that the Commodore 64 version "isn't quite as electrifying as the arcade version, but it's an entertaining action-strategy test". The magazine concluded that "the learning curve is steep, but ... when the joysticks are in the hands of two practiced gamers, it is one of the most exciting games to hit the computer screen in a long time".

== Legacy ==
Karate Champ inspired numerous martial arts games. Its release was followed by a wave of karate and kung fu games attempting to capitalize on its success. It is credited with establishing and popularizing the one-on-one fighting game genre, for which IGN listed it as one of the top ten most influential games of all time. Many of the mainstays in the fighting game genre, such as the best-of-three format, specific control inputs to pull off special moves, and bonus rounds after a specific number of victories, were established by this game. The Player vs Player edition of Karate Champ was also the first fighting game to allow two players to fight each other.

Karate Champ influenced titles such as Konami's Yie Ar Kung-Fu (1985), Beam Software's The Way of the Exploding Fist (1985), and other fighting games. John Tobias cited Karate Champ as the primary inspiration for the gameplay of Mortal Kombat (1992).

In 1985, Data East began taking legal action against counterfeit arcade manufacturers, both in Japan and internationally. Data East later brought suit against Epyx alleging copyright infringement for its 1986 game World Karate Championship. The case, Data East USA, Inc. v. Epyx, Inc., went to the Ninth Circuit Court, where it was held that the typical purchaser of the games would not find them substantially similar. Karate Champ was again involved in a later case, Capcom U.S.A. Inc. v. Data East Corp., in Data East's defense over Capcom's allegations of Fighter's History (1993) plagiarizing Street Fighter II (1991).
