= Karnov's Revenge =

1994 video game

- European arcade flyer
- Developer: Data East: Rutubo Games (Saturn) Onan Games (Zeebo)
- Publisher: Data East: SNK (AES/CD) Sega (Saturn) G-Mode (Zeebo)
- Series: Fighter's History
- Platforms: Arcade, Neo Geo AES, Neo Geo CD, Sega Saturn, Zeebo
- Release: March 17, 1994: Arcade; WW: March 17, 1994 Neo Geo AES; WW: April 28, 1994 Neo Geo CD; JP: December 22, 1994; NA: October 1996 Sega Saturn; JP: July 4, 1997 Zeebo; MEX: April 13, 2010; BRA: April 16, 2010
- Genre: Fighting
- Modes: Single-player, multiplayer
- Arcade system: Neo Geo MVS

Karnov's Revenge (Note: Also known as Fighter's History Dynamite (Japanese: ファイターズヒストリーダイナマイト, Hepburn: Faitāzu Hisutorī Dainamaito) in Japan and in the USA arcade version.) is a 1994 fighting game developed and published by Data East for the Neo Geo arcade and home platforms. It is the second game in the Fighter's History series. The game was later ported to the Neo Geo AES, Neo Geo CD and Sega Saturn home consoles. Despite its title and featuring the character of the same name, it is not a sequel to Karnov.

== Gameplay ==
Screenshot showcasing a match between Karnov and Lee Diendou.

While the previous game was similar to Street Fighter's 6-button setup, the gameplay system of Karnov's Revenge is akin to SNK's fighting games such as Art of Fighting and Fatal Fury. Due to change of hardware to SNK's MVS platform, the control configuration was reduced from six attack buttons to just four (only light and heavy attacks are available this time).

A new gameplay feature is introduced in the form of "one-two attacks". When the player presses a heavy attack button while performing a light attack or blocking, the interval between light attacks is reduced, making combos easier to perform. While this feature is not mentioned on the instruction card, the final page of the home Neo Geo version's manual mentions it, describing as the "one-two attack" system.

All eleven fighters from the previous game return (including the bosses Clown and Karnov, who are now playable) and are joined by two new characters: Yungmie, a female taekwondo exponent from South Korea, and Zazie, a karate practitioner from Kenya, for a total of 13 characters. Karnov is the only returning character who was given entirely new sprites. Most of the returning characters were given new special techniques (with a few exceptions), including hidden techniques which are not listed on the instruction card (the manual for the home version hints at their inclusion). The Ox that appeared in the bonus rounds in Karate Champ appears in this game as a secret boss if the player completes the game on the Normal setting or above without losing a round. The Ox is an unplayable character.

== Release ==
The game was originally released in Japanese arcades on March 7, 1994, while the Neo Geo home console version arrived on April 28. In addition to the ports for the Neo Geo home consoles, Karnov's Revenge was released for the Sega Saturn exclusively in Japan on July 4, 1997. The Saturn version allows players to assign all four basic attacks into a single button (C and Z by default), which is required for certain characters in order to perform certain special moves. A Virtual Console reissue of the Neo Geo version was released for the Wii in Japan on June 8, 2010, PAL territories on December 3, 2010, and in North America on December 27, 2010. It was also added to the Zeebo on April 23, 2010. Hamster Corporation re-released the game as part of their ACA Neo Geo series for the PlayStation 4, Xbox One, Nintendo Switch and Windows.

== Reception ==
Reception

Review scores
| Publication | Score |
|---|---|
| Famitsu | 25/40 (Neo Geo) |
| Nintendo Life | 5/10 (Wii Virtual Console); 5/10 (Nintendo Switch) |

In Japan, Game Machine listed Karnov's Revenge on their April 15, 1994 issue as being the fourth most-successful table arcade unit of the month. In North America, RePlay reported Karnov's Revenge to be the ninth most-popular arcade game at the time.

On release, Famicom Tsūshin scored the Neo Geo version of the game a 25 out of 40. GamePro rated it as a modest improvement over the first game, with faster-paced action but the same lack of likeable characters, but they said the new characters are better than the old ones, especially Yeong-mi and her unique trait of using only her legs to attack.

Nintendo Life gave it mixed reviews to both the Wii Virtual Console release and the Nintendo Switch re-release. The author Corbie Dillard praised the weak point system and one-two attacks, but remarked they aren't enough to make the game any more notable than the other average fighting games. In the other review by Dave Frear, he said that attacks often do not flow together, sometimes making button mashing more effective than planned moves. At the end of the review, he recommended playing other fighting games like Art of Fighting, Fatal Fury, Samurai Shodown, World Heroes, Aggressors of Dark Kombat, and The King of Fighters.

== See also ==
- Karnov
- Fighter's History characters
