= Spry Fox, LLC v. Lolapps, Inc. =

2012 American legal case

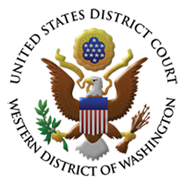
- Court: United States District Court for the Western District of Washington
- Full case name: Spry Fox, LLC v. Lolapps, Inc. et al.
- Decided: October 29, 2012
- Citations: No. 2:12-cv-00147 (W.D. Wash., 2012)

Court membership
- Judge sitting: Richard A. Jones

Spry Fox, LLC v. Lolapps, Inc., No. 2:12-cv-00147 (W.D. Wash., 2012), was a court case between two video game developers, where Spry Fox alleged that the game Yeti Town, developed by 6waves Lolapps, infringed on their copyrighted game Triple Town. While the case was settled out of court, preliminary opinions by Judge Richard A. Jones affirmed that a video game's "look and feel" may be protected by copyright, affirming the federal district court decision in Tetris Holding, LLC v. Xio Interactive, Inc. from earlier the same year.

Despite the games having cosmetic differences with different settings, the similarities between the games were evidence that Yeti Town had illegally appropriated elements of Triple Town. The judge rejected a motion from 6waves Lolapps to dismiss the case, thus undermining their main defense, since the games did have several identical gameplay elements. In October 2012, the companies announced a settlement where Spry Fox would own the intellectual property for both games.

== Background ==
In 2011, Spry Fox created Triple Town, where players build a city by matching tiles, and merging objects into larger ones. Spry Fox approached Lolapps to help port the game to the iOS platform. The parties signed a non-disclosure agreement granting access to the Triple Town assets. Around this time, Lolapps merged with another social gaming company called 6waves to form 6waves Lolapps. Within a few months, 6waves Lolapps announced that they would no longer work with Spry Fox. The company soon announced their plans to release their own tile-matching game, called Yeti Town.

Both games have similar gameplay. They are both match-three games on a six-by-six grid. When three identical objects are placed next to each other on the grid, they transform into another object, such as combining shrubs into a tree. As the player tries to combine objects and increase their score, the game creates challenges by placing new objects that clutter the game grid. Both games also have a marketplace with identical prices for analogous items, and similar language in their dialog boxes. However, there are cosmetic differences, particularly the titular Yeti playing the same role as Triple Town's bear, and Yeti Town being presented in 3D rather than the 2D presentation of Triple Town.

== Dispute ==
In January 2012, Spry Fox filed a copyright infringement claim against 6waves Lolapps in the Western District of Washington. During the dispute, correspondence surfaced where 6waves Lolapps admitted that Yeti Town had a "similar match-3 style" to Triple Town. Since copying is usually proved by showing that a potential infringer had access to the original work, 6waves Lolapps did not deny that they had acquired access, nor did they deny the validity of Spry Fox's copyright. However, 6waves Lolapps asked the court to dismiss the case on the basis that the basic gameplay in Triple Town was not protected by copyright, based on similar rulings such as Data East USA, Inc. v. Epyx, Inc. from 1988.

Publicly, Spry Fox's chief creative officer commented that "there are also people who have learned from history that cloning is a valid business model, and they’re going to build out entire companies around that concept". In a statement, 6waves Lolapps responded that "the copyright infringement claims are unjustified" and that they respected intellectual property.

== Motion and settlement ==
Judge Richard A. Jones found that Yeti Town had appropriated many expressive elements of Triple Town, saying that a copyright issue "must focus on what is similar, not what is different, when comparing two works".

Order on motion to dismiss

Judge Richard A. Jones ruled on 6waves Lolapps' motion for dismissal. The court focused on the idea–expression distinction, where a party is entitled to copyright in the expression of an idea, but not the idea itself. The court excluded some elements of Triple Town from copyright protection as "scènes à faire", such as using coins to track the score and exchange for in-game advantages. The court also excluded some purely functional elements, such as the six-by-six game grid. The court also explained that copyright cannot protect the overall game "idea", particularly a game about matching objects, where some of those objects are ill-placed to obstruct the player. However, the court found that Yeti Town had appropriated many expressive elements of Triple Town, including the hierarchy of objects, and the presence of a wild creature that tried to foil the player's progress. This was despite the games' visual differences, including the pastoral versus snowy themes, and the overall distinct characters.

The object hierarchy is similar. Progressing from grass to bush to tree to hut is similar to progressing from sapling to tree to tent to cabin. Perhaps more importantly, the object hierarchy coupled with the depiction of the field of play comprise a setting and theme that is similar to Triple Town's. A snowfield is not so different from a meadow, bears and yetis are both wild creatures. ... There are apparent differences between [the] games ... but a court must focus on what is similar, not what is different, when comparing two works.

There were several major factors in the ruling. The court did not focus on what made the games different, focusing instead on what was similar. The court also noted the existence of a non-disclosure agreement, giving 6waves Lolapps access to the Triple Town assets. Although the game's names are not technically copyrighted, their similarity was relevant to the question of substantial similarity. The court also accepted evidence from several online commentators that the games were substantially similar. However, the court did not play either game, basing their opinion on screenshots and written descriptions of gameplay. In the end, the court denied the defendant's motion to dismiss the copyright claim.

The ruling pushed the parties towards a legal settlement, since much of the legal strategy for 6waves Lolapps rested on the argument that copyright does not protect gameplay – an argument that the court rejected. The parties soon settled out of court, resulting in Spry Fox owning the intellectual property for both games.

== Impact ==
Along with the 2012 copyright case Tetris Holding, LLC v. Xio Interactive, Inc., this ruling indicates a legal system that is willing to protect original games from potential clones. Although the ruling was only on the motion to dismiss, it is notable that they found substantial similarity despite having distinguishable art assets, unlike the Tetris v. Xio case. Legal scholars Elizabeth and Ronald Gard noted that the motion was decided days after the Tetris v. Xio decision, finding substantial similarity between the two games based on the look and feel instead of literal copying. According to the Harvard Journal of Sports and Entertainment Law, the Spry Fox decision shows that courts are willing to apply the reasoning in Tetris v. Xio, and rulings may be the product of a judge's greater experience with video games than rulings from decades prior. Kyle Orland from Ars Technica also compared the case to Tetris v. Xio, and similarly argued that judges had evolved on video game copyright due to greater experience with the medium. The visual differences between the games show that courts are willing to consider the possibility of copyright infringement where the games are not identical.

According to legal scholar Alex Nealon, a major factor in the ruling was likely the existing relationship between the developers. This was also the analysis of attorney of Jack C. Schecter, who noted that 6waves Lolapps had agreed to develop an iOS version of Triple Town before releasing their alleged clone. John Kuehl made similar comments for the Mitchell Hamline School of Law, noting that courts are more likely to find infringement where there was demonstrable evidence that the defendant was trying to imitate the plaintiff's game.

In the book Video Game Law, Spry Fox is highlighted in a trend of video game clone lawsuits in the 2010s, and also noted for its similarity to the 1982 clone case Atari v. Philips. Attorney Stephen McArthur noted that this pushed copyright law closer to protecting game mechanics and punishing clones, but cautioned courts to find a balance between shutting down egregious clones without giving monopolies to entire genres of games. Eric Goldman felt that it would be difficult to ever find definitive guidance about copying, due to the difficulty around interpreting the idea–expression distinction. Writing for Eurogamer, Rich Stanton cited Spry Fox to demonstrate that "fighting the cloners is not a war that can ever be 'won' ... [b]ut it's a battle worth fighting regardless, one where original work can be protected better."
