= International Karate =

1985 video game

- Commodore 64 cover art
- Developers: LT Software (Amstrad, Spectrum), Archer Maclean (Atari 8-bit, C64)
- Publishers: System 3 (Europe); Epyx (US)
- Composer: Rob Hubbard
- Platforms: ZX Spectrum, Amstrad CPC, Apple II, Atari 8-bit, Atari ST, Commodore 64 / 16, MS-DOS, Game Boy Color, Game Boy Advance, MSX, Virtual Console
- Release: Spectrum: EU: November 1985; Commodore 64: NA: 30 April 1986; EU: ca. May 1986; Atari ST: NA: Jan, 1987; Virtual Console (C64): EU: 28 March 2008; NA: 23 February 2009
- Genre: Fighting
- Modes: Single-player, multiplayer

International Karate is a fighting game published by System 3 for the ZX Spectrum in 1985 and ported to various home computers over the following years. In the United States it was published by Epyx in 1986 as World Karate Championship.

It was the first European-developed game to become a major hit in the United States, where it sold over 1.5 million copies, but it drew controversy for its similarities to Karate Champ (1984), which led to Data East filing a lawsuit against Epyx. International Karate +, a successor which expanded the gameplay, was released in 1987.

== Gameplay ==
A match in progress (Atari 8-bit)

The core game is a two-dimensional, one-on-one, versus fighting game. Players take on the roles of martial artists competing in a kumite tournament. Rather than wearing down an opponent's health, the goal is instead to score single solid hits. After each hit, combat stops and both combatants are returned to their starting positions. Depending on how well players hit their opponent, they score either a half-point or a full point. Matches can be quite brief, as only two full points are required to win, and a point can be quickly scored just seconds after a round begins.

In single-player mode, successive opponents increase in difficulty from novice white belts to master black belts. Play continues as long as the player continues to win matches. Between fights, bonus mini-games focusing on rhythm and timing appear, including one in which the player must break a number of stacked boards using the fighter's head. As in newer games in the genre, starting specifically with Street Fighter, the fights take place against a variety of backdrops (eight in total) representing different locations in the world: the Mount Fuji (Tokyo, Japan), the Sydney Harbour (Sydney, Australia), the Statue of Liberty (New York, USA), the Forbidden City (Beijing, China), the Christ the Redeemer (Rio de Janeiro, Brazil), the Palace of Westminster (London, England), the Parthenon (Athens, Greece), and the Great Pyramid of Giza (Cairo, Egypt).

The title utilizes the standard one-button joystick, allowing players to execute a variety of karate techniques. Unlike modern 2D fighting games, players do not turn around if the opponent is behind them and must instead execute one of three "turn-around" maneuvers to change direction.

== Ports ==
Atari ST version

Archer Maclean, initially only employed by System 3 to create graphics routines when the original programmer and artist walked out, developed the Commodore 64 version from scratch as he had no interest in porting the original ZX Spectrum version. Another port exists for the MSX platform. A version for the Atari ST home computer was created by Andromeda Software and released in 1986. This version featured the most advanced graphics of all versions as the 16 bit hardware supported more colors and larger sprites. The port to IBM PC compatibles, published the same year, uses 4-color CGA graphics.

== Lawsuit ==
After the release of World Karate Championship in the US in late April 1986, Epyx was sued by video game publisher Data East for infringement of copyright, trademark, and trade dress. The dispute was about similarities to the 1984 arcade game Karate Champ and its home computer adaptations published in 1985. International Karate used the same colored fighters and had the same points system. The initial trial at the District Court for the Northern District of California began on 28 October 1986. In his decision of 28 January 1987, the court dismissed the allegations of trademark and trade dress infringement but found Epyx guilty of infringing upon Data East USA's copyright on Karate Champ. Data East was granted a permanent injunction against Epyx, Inc., and an impoundment was also ordered to restrain Epyx from selling or distributing World Karate Championship, and Epyx was also required to recall all copies of the game from customers and distributors.

The decision was appealed the United States Court of Appeals for the Ninth Circuit, who in November 1988 reversed the decision, stating that while the game was similar, it was not identical and that one game company can not monopolize one entire sport.

== Reception ==
World Karate Championship was a commercial success in the United States, where it became the first European-developed game to top the Billboard software charts. The game went on to sell over 1.5 million copies in the United States.

Rick Teverbaugh reviewed the game for Computer Gaming World, and wrote that Epyx continued to take a strong stand in the foreground of the arcade sports programs with World Karate Championship. Charles Ardai called the game "an original Karate Champ clone, but it's the best one available ... Great scenery adds to the ambience". Computer Entertainer reviewed the Apple IIe version and scored it 3.5 out of 4 stars.

Your Sinclair reviewed the ZX Spectrum version in 1990, giving it a 74% score.

In a 2006 retrospective of the genre, Retro Gamer gave the game an 86% rating, referring to it as an "excellent" game that was overshadowed by the earlier release of The Way of the Exploding Fist.

== Legacy ==
In 2000, a Game Boy Color version, created without input from Archer Maclean, was released as International Karate 2000. It sported some enhancements and was the basis for International Karate Advanced, a remake released in 2001 for the Game Boy Advance. The C64 version saw re-releases in 2004 as a title on the C64 Direct-to-TV, and in 2008 on the Wii Virtual Console.
