= Triple Town =

2010 video game

- Developer: Spry Fox
- Publisher: Spry Fox
- Engine: Unity
- Platforms: Amazon Kindle, Google+, Facebook, iOS, Android, Kindle Fire, Microsoft Windows, Macintosh
- Release: October 14, 2010, October 2011, January 2012, December 2012
- Genre: Strategy
- Mode: Single-player

Triple Town is a 2010 freemium strategy puzzle video game developed and published by Spry Fox. It is available for social networks and mobile devices.

The casual game was originally released for the Amazon Kindle e-reader in 2010, and was ported to the Facebook and Google+ social networks in October 2011. It was published in January 2012 for iOS and some Android devices. It was released for Windows and Macintosh through Steam on December 6, 2012.

== Gameplay ==
The premise of the turn-based, single-player game is that the player must build a new settlement. The game takes place on a 6×6 grid of fields on which some tiles are randomly placed.

Players are given random tiles, most often grass tiles, that they must place on the grid. When three or more identical tiles adjoin, they merge into one more advanced tile at the position of the last tile placed: three grass tiles become a bush, three bushes a tree, three trees a hut, three huts a house, and so forth. Merging four or more tiles earns coins or a tile which is held in the inventory located in the sidebar. There are three special tiles: bears, crystals, and imperial bots. Bears move to a neighboring square each turn, blocking building sites until they are trapped. Ninjas act the same, except they can move to any empty square on the board. When they are trapped or an imperial bot is used on them, they turn into a gravestone. Three gravestones make a church, three churches a cathedral, and so forth. Crystals can be used as a wild card to make any match. Imperial bots remove individual tiles, or, if used on bears, turn them into gravestones. The player may keep one tile in reserve in the storehouse, usually located in the top left corner of the screen, and use it when needed.

The objective of the game is to upgrade one's settlement's tiles to as high a rank as possible, earning an accordingly high score. The game ends if all fields of the grid are filled.

In 2012 the Capital City feature was added to the Web-based version of the game, which acts as a home base. In the Capital City the player can select which settlement they want to go to, and also build up the Capital City itself. When Capital City tiles are earned, they are placed in the inventory.

=== In-game money ===
In Triple Town on the Web, there are two types of in-game money: coins and diamonds. Each can be purchased using real money, although coins can also be earned during gameplay. When a user first plays Triple Town, they are given several thousand coins and a small number of diamonds. In the mobile version of the game, there are only coins, not diamonds.

== Reception ==
Triple Town received positive reviews. Reviewers praised the game's innovative extensions of the match-three mechanic as well as its strategic depth, unusual for a casual game, which requires players to plan several moves ahead in order to be successful. Criticism focused on the game's limited content and its implementation of the freemium business model: while the game is free, it comes with a limited number of turns. Once these are used up, they regenerate slowly, or may be purchased with in-game or real money. The turn limit can be permanently removed with a one-time payment.

Casual gaming website Gamezebo named Triple Town the best Facebook game of 2011, and second-best game of the year 2011. Triple Town was also Edge's runner-up for indie game of the year 2011, and Gamasutra's runner-up for best social game of 2011. During the 15th Annual Interactive Achievement Awards, the Academy of Interactive Arts & Sciences nominated Triple Town for "Social Networking Game of the Year".

== Copyright infringement dispute ==
In January 2012, Spry Fox filed a lawsuit against Lolapps and 6Waves LLC, known as Spry Fox, LLC v. Lolapps, Inc.. The complaint alleges that these companies published, in violation of Spry Fox's copyright, a yeti-themed game Yeti Town that is substantially a copy of Triple Town. LOLAPPS and 6Waves had previously denied these allegations.

A US court noted that while the game mechanics have little protection, the style and expression of the clone are too similar to Triple Town, and thus denied 6Waves' motion to dismiss Spry Fox's infringement claim. In October 2012 they reached a settlement resulting in the transfer of Yeti Town's copyright to Spry Fox.
