= Scènes à faire =

Obligatory feature in a genre

A scène à faire (French for "scene to be made" or "scene that must be done"; plural: scènes à faire; both pronounced [sɛn a fɛʁ]) is a scene in a work of fiction which is almost obligatory for a work in that genre.

In the United States, it also refers to a principle in copyright law in which certain elements of a creative work are held to be not protected when they are mandated by or customary to the genre, a principle which has been expanded to cover other fields such as software development.

== Examples in different genres ==
For example, a spy novel is expected to contain elements such as numbered Swiss bank accounts, a deadly woman, and various spy gadgets hidden in wristwatches, belts, shoes, and other personal effects. The United States Court of Appeals for the Second Circuit interpreted the scènes à faire doctrine expansively to hold that a motion picture about police work in the South Bronx would need to feature stereotypical elements such as drunks, prostitutes, vermin, and derelict cars to be perceived as realistic, and therefore a later film that duplicated these features of an earlier film did not infringe. These elements are not protected by copyright, though specific sequences and compositions of them can be.

== Policy ==
The policy rationale of the doctrine of scènes à faire is that granting a first-comer exclusivity over scènes à faire would greatly hinder others in the subsequent creation of other expressive works. That would be against the constitutionally mandated policy of the copyright law to promote progress in the creation of works, and it would be an impediment to the public's enjoyment of such further creative expressions. By the same token, little benefit to society would flow from grants of copyright exclusivity over scènes à faire.

In a business and computer program context, the doctrine of scènes à faire is interpreted to apply to the practices and demands of the businesses and industries that the given computer program serves. Hence, the concepts of idea vs. expression (merger doctrine) and scènes à faire relate directly to promoting availability of business functionality.

In CMM Cable Rep., Inc. v. Ocean Coast Properties, Inc., 97 F.3d 1504 (1st Cir. 1996), the court compared the merger and scènes à faire doctrines. The court said that the two doctrines were similar in policy, in that they both sought to prevent monopolization of ideas. However, merger applied when idea and expression were inseparable, but scènes à faire applied despite separability where an external common setting caused use of common elements and thus similarity of expression.

== Limits of doctrine ==
The doctrine must be a matter of degree—that is, operate on a continuum. Consider the Second Circuit's ruling that the scène à faire for a movie about the South Bronx would need to feature drunks, prostitutes, vermin (rats, in the accused and copyrighted works), and derelict cars. The principle must have a limit, however, so that something is outside the scènes à faire doctrine for South Bronx movies. Perhaps, cockroaches, gangs, and muggings are also part of the South Bronx scène à faire, but further similarity such as the film having as characters "a slumlord with a heart of gold and a policeman who is a Zen Buddhist and lives in a garage surely goes beyond the South Bronx scène à faire. There must be some expression possible even in a cliche-ridden genre."

== Cases ==
- Cain v. Universal Pictures, 47 F.Supp. 1013 (United States District Court for the Southern District of California 1942)
  This was the case where the term was introduced, when the writer James M. Cain sued Universal Pictures, the scriptwriter and the director for copyright infringement in connection with the film When Tomorrow Comes. Cain claimed a scene in his book where two protagonists take refuge from a storm in a church had been copied in a scene depicting the same situation in the movie. Judge Leon Rene Yankwich ruled that there was no resemblance between the scenes in the book and the film other than incidental "scènes à faire", or natural similarities due to the situation.

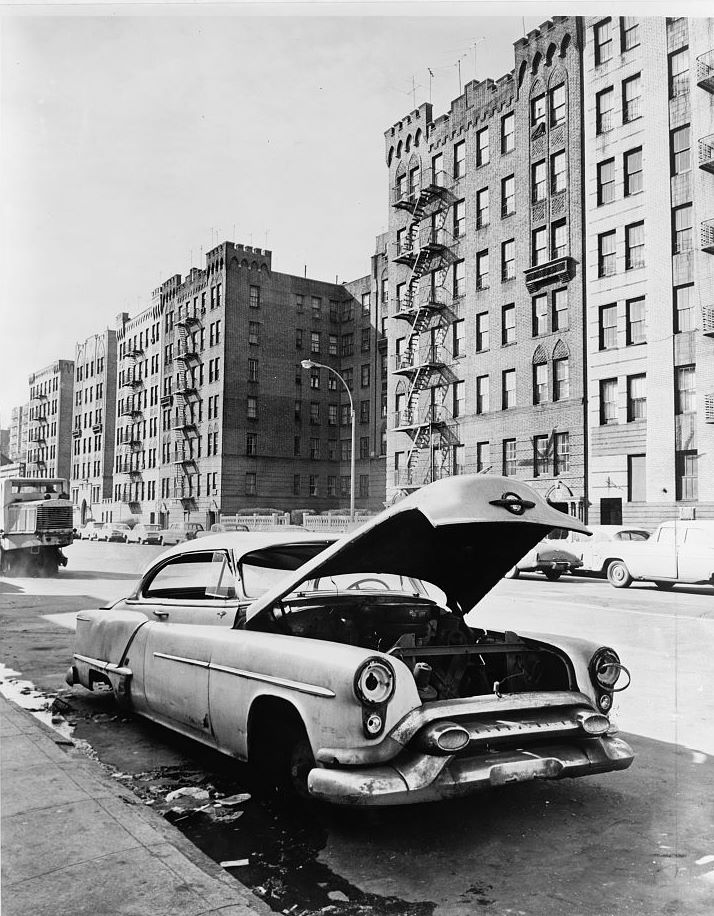
Macombs Road in Morris Heights, circa 1964: a stereotypical scene of the South Bronx

- Walker v. Time Life Films, Inc., 784 F.2d 44 (2d Cir. 1986)
  After the release of the film Fort Apache, The Bronx, author Thomas Walker filed a lawsuit against one of the production companies, Time-Life Television Films (legal owner of the script), claiming that the producers infringed on his book Fort Apache (New York: Crowell, 1976. ISBN 0-690-01047-8). Among other things, Walker, the plaintiff, argued that: "both the book and the film begin with the murder of a black and a white policeman with a handgun at close range; both depict cockfights, drunks, stripped cars, prostitutes and rats; both feature as central characters third- or fourth-generation Irish policemen who live in Queens and frequently drink; both show disgruntled, demoralized police officers and unsuccessful foot chases of fleeing criminals." But the United States Court of Appeals for the Second Circuit ruled that these are stereotypical ideas, and that the United States copyright law does not protect concepts or ideas. The court ruling stated: "the book Fort Apache and the film Fort Apache: The Bronx were not substantially similar beyond [the] level of generalized or otherwise nonprotectible ideas, and thus [the] latter did not infringe copyright of [the] former."
- Joshua Ets-Hokin v. Skyy Spirits Inc., 225 F.3d 1068 (9th Cir. 2000)

Another significant case in United States law was Ets-Hokin v. Skyy Spirits (2003), in which scenes à faire was upheld as an affirmative defense by the United States Court of Appeals for the Ninth Circuit. The case involved a commercial photographer, Joshua Ets-Hokin, who sued SKYY vodka when another photographer created advertisements with a substantially similar appearance to work he had done for them in the past. It was established that the similarity between his work and the later works of the photographer was largely mandated by the limited range of expression possible; within the constraints of a photo shoot for a commercial product there are only so many ways one may photograph a vodka bottle. In light of this, to establish copyright infringement, the two photos would have been required to be virtually identical. The originality of the later work was established by such minor differences as different shadows and angles.

- Gates Rubber Co. v. Bando Chemical Industries, Ltd., 9 F.3d 823 (10th Cir. 1993)
  A significant scènes à faire case in the computer program context is Gates v. Bando. The court explained the policy and application of the doctrine to computer program copyright infringement cases in these terms:

Under the scènes à faire doctrine, we deny protection to those expressions that are standard, stock, or common to a particular topic or that necessarily follow from a common theme or setting. Granting copyright protection to the necessary incidents of an idea would effectively afford a monopoly to the first programmer to express those ideas. Furthermore, where a particular expression is common to the treatment of a particular idea, process, or discovery, it is lacking in the originality that is the sine qua non for copyright protection.
The scènes à faire doctrine also excludes from protection those elements of a program that have been dictated by external factors. In the area of computer programs these external factors may include: hardware standards and mechanical specifications, software standards and compatibility requirements, computer manufacturer design standards, target industry practices and demands, and computer industry programming practices.

- RG Anand v. M/s Deluxe Films, AIR 1978 SC 1613
  The plaintiff was the writer and producer of a play called Hum Hindustani that was produced in the period of 1953–1955. The play was based on the evils of provincialism. The defendant in 1956 produced a film called New Delhi. One of the themes of the film was provincialism, too. While evaluating whether or not the defendant had infringed the plaintiff's copyright, the Supreme Court of India held:
  There can be no copyright in an idea, subject matter, themes, plots or historical or legendary facts and violation of the copyright in such cases is confined to the form, manner and arrangement and expression of the idea by the author of the copyright work. (emphasis supplied)
  Therefore, the court held that there is a standard way of dealing with the theme of provincialism, and there can be no copyright over that theme. Consequently, a question of infringement does not even arise.

== See also ==
- Fair use
- Idea-expression divide
