= List of Magnavox Odyssey 2 games =

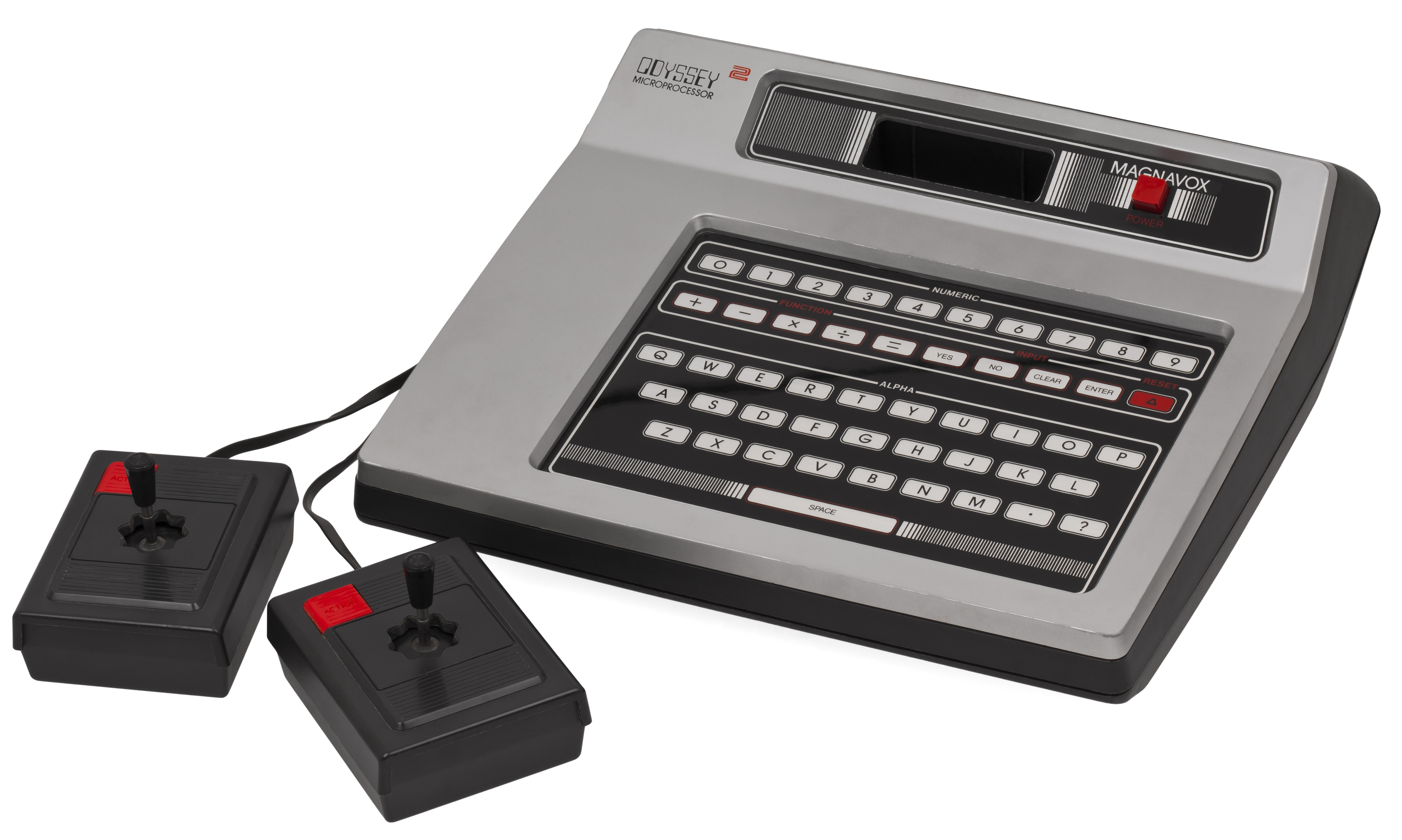
The Magnavox Odyssey2

The Magnavox Odyssey 2 (stylized as Magnavox Odyssey²) is a home video game console released in North America in September 1978 by Magnavox, at the time a wholly owned subsidiary of Philips. It was also released by Philips as the Philips Videopac G7000 in Europe, the Philips Odyssey in Brazil and Peru, and the Odyssey2 (オデッセイ2 odessei2) in Japan. (Note: Other names include the Philips Videopac C52, Radiola Jet 25, Schneider 7000, and Siera G7000.) A late revision of the Videopac known as the Philips Videopac+ G7400 (Note: Also known as the Thomson-Brandt J0 7400 or Jopac.) was released in limited quantities in 1983 with unique games. There were 80 (Note: This number is always up to date by this script.) games released for Odyssey², Videopac, and Videopac+ across all regions. Games were released in the form of ROM cartridges that were 2 KB and later 4 KB in size. In Europe, most games were given a number along with their titles in a variety of different languages. In 1981, Philips dropped the Magnavox publishing label for its Odyssey² games, directly publishing them through North American Philips (N.A.P.) instead. Only two companies, Imagic and Parker Brothers, released third-party software for the system.

Games were initially developed internally at Magnavox. After running out of ideas for new games, Intel employee Ed Averett, a member of the team behind the Intel 8048 and Intel 8244 graphics chip inside the Odyssey², opted to develop games for the system as a freelance developer. He developed at least 25 games for the Odyssey² including K.C. Munchkin and Quest for the Rings, two of the systems most notable releases. He occasionally also enlisted help from his wife, Linda. Packaging and marketing materials for the games were designed by Steve Lehner and Rob Bradford of Bradford/Cout Design, a Chicago based marketing firm which had previously worked on the Magnavox Odyssey.

Two expansion modules were released for the system over its lifespan. In Europe, Philips released a computer chess expansion, the Videopac C7010 Chess Module, a separate unit with an additional CPU that plugs into the cartridge port. In North America, Philips released a voice synthesis expansion module called "The Voice" in September 1982. The module was optional for all the games that used it. This list contains only games officially released by Philips, Imagic, or Parker Brothers during the lifespan of the console.

== Official games ==
Title	#	Developer	Publisher	NA	PAL	Videopac+	Ref.
4 in 1 Row	40		Philips	Unreleased	1982	Unreleased	
Air Battle	58		Philips	Unreleased	1983	1983	
Alien Invaders - Plus! Space Monster^{PAL}	22	Ed Averett; Linda Averett	Philips^{WW} Magnavox^{NA}	August 1980	1980	1983	
Alpine Skiing! Skiing^{PAL}	25	Ed Averett	Philips^{WW} Magnavox^{NA}	August 1979	1980	Unreleased	
Armored Encounter! / Subchase! Air-Sea War / Battle^{PAL}	4	Magnavox	Philips^{WW} Magnavox^{NA}	September 1978	1978	Unreleased	
Atlantis		Jeff Ronne (Note: As printed in the game's manual.)	Imagic	May 1983	August 1983	Unreleased	
Attack of the Timelord! (Note: Compatible with "The Voice" expansion module.); Terrahawks^{PAL}	51	Ed Averett; Linda Averett	Philips	December 1982	October 1983	1983	
Backgammon	48		Philips	Unreleased	1983	Unreleased	
Baseball!	8	Magnavox	Philips^{WW} Magnavox^{NA}	September 1978	1978	Unreleased	
Blobbers	57		Philips	Unreleased	1983	Unreleased	
Blockout! / Breakdown! Dam Buster^{PAL}	29	Ed Averett	Philips^{WW} Magnavox^{NA}	August 1980	1981	Unreleased	
Bowling! / Basketball! Tenpin Bowling / Basketball^{PAL}	6	Sam Overton	Philips^{WW} Magnavox^{NA}	September 1978	1978	Unreleased	
C7010 Chess Module			Philips	Unreleased	April 1983	Unreleased	
Casino Slot Machine! Las Vegas Gambling^{PAL}	23	Ed Averett	Philips^{WW} Magnavox^{NA}	August 1980	1980	Unreleased	
Catch The Ball / Noughts and Crosses	19		Philips	Unreleased	1980	Unreleased	
Chez Maxime (Note: Only released in France for the Thomson-Brandt Jopac.)		Jean Tarrad	Thomson-Brandt	Unreleased	Unreleased	1983	
Chinese Logic	17		Philips	Unreleased	1980	Unreleased	
Clay Pigeon! (Note: Only released in Brazil.)		Göran Öhman	Philips	Unreleased	1984	Unreleased	
Comando Noturno!			Philips	Unreleased	1985	Unreleased	
Computer Golf! Golf^{PAL}	10	Sam Overton	Philips^{WW} Magnavox^{NA}	July 1979	1978	Unreleased	
Computer Intro! Computer Programmer^{PAL}	9	Sam Overton	Philips^{WW} Magnavox^{NA}	August 1979	1978	Unreleased	
Conquest of the World	41	Ed Averett; Steve Lehner	Philips	November 1981	June 1982	Unreleased	
Cosmic Conflict!	11	Sam Overton	Philips^{WW} Magnavox^{NA}	October 1979	1978	October 1983	
Demon Attack		Dave Johnson	Imagic	March 1983	August 1983	Unreleased	
Depth Charge / Marksman	16		Philips	Unreleased	1979	Unreleased	
Des chiffres et des lettres			Thomson-Brandt	Unreleased	Unreleased	1983	
Dynasty! Samurai^{PAL}	15	Magnavox	Philips^{WW} Magnavox^{NA}	August 1979	1979	Unreleased	
Electronic Table Soccer! Electronic Table Football^{PAL}	27	Ed Averett	Philips^{WW} Magnavox^{NA}	August 1980	1980	Unreleased	
Exojet+			Thomson-Brandt	Unreleased	Unreleased	1983	
Football! American Football^{PAL}	3	Sam Overton	Philips^{WW} Magnavox^{NA}	September 1978	1978	Unreleased	
Freedom Fighters!	39	Ed Averett (Note: As printed on the game's cartridge.)	Philips	May 1982	1982	October 1983	
Frogger			Parker Brothers	Unreleased	1984	1984	
The Great Wall Street Fortune Hunt	46	Ed Averett; Steve Lehner	Philips	April 1982	1983	Unreleased	
Hockey! / Soccer! Electronic Soccer / Electronic Ice Hockey^{PAL}	36	Ed Averett	Philips^{WW} Magnavox^{NA}	August 1979	1981	Unreleased	
Invaders from Hyperspace! Laser War^{PAL}	18	Ed Averett	Philips^{WW} Magnavox^{NA}	August 1979	1980	Unreleased	
I've Got Your Number! Playschool Maths^{NA}	13	Ed Averett	Philips^{WW} Magnavox^{NA}	August 1979	1979	Unreleased	
K.C. Munchkin! (Note: Pulled from the market following a lawsuit from Atari.); Munchkin^{PAL}	38	Ed Averett	Philips	November 1981	1982	Unreleased	
K.C.'s Krazy Chase! Crazy Chase^{PAL}	44	Ed Averett	Philips	September 1982	May 1983	Unreleased	
Keyboard Creations! Newscaster	A		Philips	November 1981	1981	Unreleased	
Killer Bees!	52	Bob Harris	Philips	April 1983	1983	1983	
A Labyrinth Game / Supermind	32		Philips	Unreleased	1981	Unreleased	
Las Vegas Blackjack! Blackjack^{PAL}	5	Sam Overton	Philips^{WW} Magnavox^{NA}	September 1978	1978	Unreleased	
Loony Balloon	54		Philips	Unreleased	1983	1983	
Matchmaker! / Buzzword! / Logix! Pairs / Space Rendezvous / Logic^{PAL}	2	Magnavox	Philips^{WW} Magnavox^{NA}	September 1978	1978	Unreleased	
Math-A-Magic! / Echo! Mathematician / Echo^{PAL}	7	Magnavox	Philips^{WW} Magnavox^{NA}	September 1978	1978	Unreleased	
Monkeyshines!	37	Ed Averett	Philips	November 1981	July 1982	Unreleased	
Morse	45		Philips	Unreleased	September 1983	Unreleased	
Moto-Crash+			Thomson-Brandt	Unreleased	Unreleased	1983	
The Mousing Cat	47		Philips	Unreleased	1984	1984	
Musician (Note: Released with a musical keyboard overlay.)	31	Jon Shuttleworth; Peter van Twist	Philips	Unreleased	1981	Unreleased	
Neutron Star	55		Philips	Unreleased	1983	1983	
Nightmare	53		Philips	Unreleased	1983	1983	
Nimble Numbers Ned!		Bob Harris	Philips	September 1982	Unreleased	Unreleased	
Norseman	56	Jake Dowding; Andy Eltis	Philips	Unreleased	Unreleased	1983	
Out of this World! (Note: Released as Space Rendezvous in Europe packaged with Pairs and Logic as Videopac #2.) / Helicopter Rescue! Helicopter Rescue^{PAL}	59	Magnavox	Philips^{WW} Magnavox^{NA}	August 1979	Unreleased	1983	
Jumping Acrobats; P.T. Barnum's Acrobats!^{NA}	33	Jim Butler (Note: Adapted the game for North America.)	Philips	October 1982	1981	Unreleased	
Pachinko! Basket Game^{PAL}	26	Ed Averett	Philips^{WW} Magnavox^{NA}	August 1980	1980	Unreleased	
Pick Axe Pete! Pickaxe Pete^{PAL}	43	Ed Averett	Philips	July 1982	April 1983	October 1983	
Pocket Billiards! Electronic Billiards^{PAL}	35	Ed Averett	Philips^{WW} Magnavox^{NA}	August 1980	1981	Unreleased	
Popeye			Parker Brothers	Unreleased	1984	Unreleased	
Power Lords (Note: Initially developed for the ColecoVision.)		Odyssey	Philips	October 1983	1983	Unreleased	
Q*bert			Parker Brothers	Unreleased	1984	1984	
Quest for the Rings	42	Ed Averett; Steve Lehner	Philips^{WW} Magnavox^{NA}	July 1981	April 1982	Unreleased	
Secret of the Pharaohs	21		Philips	Unreleased	1980	Unreleased	
Showdown in 2100 A.D. Gunfighter^{PAL}	14	Ed Averett	Philips^{WW} Magnavox^{NA}	August 1979	1979	Unreleased	
Sid the Spellbinder!		Sam Overton	Philips	November 1982	Unreleased	Unreleased	
Speedway! / Spin-out! / Cryptologic! Race / Spin-Out / Cryptogram^{PAL}	1	Magnavox	Philips^{WW} Magnavox^{NA}	September 1978	1978	October 1983	
Stone Sling; Smithereens!^{NA}	20	Robert Cheezem	Philips	November 1982	1980	October 1983	
Super Bee	50		Philips	Unreleased	1983	Unreleased	
Super Cobra			Parker Brothers	Unreleased	1984	Unreleased	
Syracuse			Thomson-Brandt	Unreleased	Unreleased	1983	
Take the Money and Run!	12	Ed Averett; Linda Averett	Philips^{WW} Magnavox^{NA}	August 1979	1979	Unreleased	
Thunderball! Flipper Game^{PAL}	24	Magnavox	Philips^{WW} Magnavox^{NA}	August 1979	1980	Unreleased	
Trans American Rally	60	Göran Öhman	Philips	Unreleased	Unreleased	1984	
Le Trésor Englouti+			Thomson-Brandt	Unreleased	Unreleased	1983	
Turtles!	49	Jim Butler	Philips	April 1983	1983	1983	
Type & Tell!		Robert Cheezem	Philips	September 1982	Unreleased	Unreleased	
UFO! Satellite Attack^{PAL}	34	Ed Averett; Linda Averett	Philips^{WW} Magnavox^{NA}	May 1981	1981	October 1983	
Volleyball! Electronic Volleyball^{PAL}	28	Ed Averett	Philips^{WW} Magnavox^{NA}	August 1980	1981	Unreleased	
War of Nerves! Battlefield^{PAL}	30	Ed Averett	Philips^{WW} Magnavox^{NA}	August 1979	1981	Unreleased	

== See also ==
- Videopac G7000
- Videopac G7200
- Videopac G7400
