= K.C.'s Krazy Chase! =

1982 video game

- Developer: Ed Averett
- Publishers: NA: North American Philips; PAL: Philips N.V.
- Platform: Odyssey²/Videopac
- Release: NA: October 1982; PAL: June 1983
- Genre: Maze
- Mode: Single-player

K.C.'s Krazy Chase!, also known in Europe as Videopac 44 - Crazy Chase, is a 1982 maze video game created by Ed Averett and published by Philips for the Magnavox Odyssey², also known as the Philips Videopac G7000. It is the sequel to K.C. Munchkin!, which was pulled from the market following a lawsuit from Atari. It is also one of the first sequels to a home console video game. Players control a blue alien named K.C. who must navigate a maze avoiding enemies called Drats while eating body segments off the tail of the dreaded Dratapillar.

It was released along with "The Voice of Odyssey", a voice synthesis module similar to the Intellivoice, which adds occasional voice lines from K.C. while levels are being played and allows K.C. to congratulate the player at the end of a round. The use of "The Voice" module is entirely optional. The game also includes a level editor similar to its predecessor.

Both contemporary and retrospective reviews consider it to be one of the best games released for the Odyssey². It is often praised for its graphics and animation which are thought to lend it a strong sense of personality. It is also seen as much less derivative than its predecessor, with few reviews comparing it directly to Pac-Man. The voice synthesis however was heavily criticized and seen as adding little to the game.

== Gameplay ==
Like its predecessor, K.C.'s Krazy Chase is a maze game. The object of the game it to steer K.C. through a maze in search of the Dratapillar, a centipede like creature with ball shaped segments. K.C. can eat the segments on the tail end of the Dratapillar but will be killed by touching its head. K.C. must eat all six segments of the Dratapillar's body in order to move on to the next round. Also in the maze are trees, which slow K.C. down but can be eaten for points, and two enemy Drats which will chase K.C. around the maze. After munching on a Dratapillar segment, the two Drats in the maze turn white and can be eaten by K.C. for bonus points.

A gameplay screenshot showing K.C., the Drats, the Dratapillar, and scattered trees

When beginning a game, the player can choose a number of different maze layouts to start with and can create their own mazes using the Odyssey² keyboard. When using "The Voice" module, various synthesized voice lines will play while K.C. is roaming the maze including phrases such as "Go.", "Run.", and "Look out." The voice will say "Oh no!" if K.C. gets killed and if the player manages to complete a round, the voice will give a laugh and then say "Incredible."

== Development ==
K.C. Munchkin!, the predecessor to K.C.'s Krazy Chase! was a massive hit for Philips who created the game to capitalize off the success of the arcade game Pac-Man. In 1981, Atari Inc., the owners of the home console rights to Pac-Man, sued Philips for copyright infringement. In a landmark case in video game copyright law, K.C. Munchkin! was ruled too similar to Pac-Man and barred from future sale. Following the ruling, the game's developer, Ed Averett, who was a freelance developer creating Odyssey² games for Philips in exchange for royalties, began work on a sequel. Averett stated that he made the sequel to show that "K.C. was [his] character and [he] wanted it on record that it was not Pac-Man." Ed Averett along with his wife Linda, had previously made at least 20 games for the Odyssey² including UFO!, Alien Invaders - Plus!, and Quest for the Rings.

The name of the main character K.C. is a reference to then president of Philips Consumer Electronics Kenneth C. Meinken.

== Release ==
K.C.'s Krazy Chase was scheduled for release in October 1982. It was one of the first releases to utilize "The Voice of Odyssey" expansion module launched in September 1982, which provided synthesized voice clips that played alongside gameplay. The game was released in mid 1983 in Europe where it was known as Crazy Chase. (Note: Also known as Super Glouten in France and Supermampfers Rache in Germany) In Brazil, the game was released as Come-Come! and K.C. Munchkin! was later released as Come-Come II!

In the late 2010s, Ed Averett released a series of children's books featuring K.C. and a sequel known as KC Returns! for Windows 8 and 10. In 2020, another sequel was released, KC Returns! II, which included K.C.'s Krazy Chase as an Easter egg. As of 2026, both games are no longer available though the Microsoft Store.

== Reception ==
Reception

Review scores
Publication	Score
Arcade Express	9/10
Computer and Video Games	4/5
Electronic Fun with Computers & Games	3.5/4
Electronic Games 1983 Software Encyclopedia	9/10
JoyStik: How to Win at Video Games	4/5
Tilt	5/6

Electronic Games called K.C.'s Krazy Chase! a "welcome addition to the Odyssey² library" and "absolutely top drawer." They believed the voice synthesis added an extra dimension to the game though they thought some of the mid-game voice lines were a bit random. Art Levis of Electronic Fun with Computers & Games wrote that it was "more complex, faster, and more interesting" than its predecessor and that the new enemies were "far more menacing".

The Video Game Update considered the game a "let-down" and a "hoo-hum maze game", considering the "The Voice" add-on features to be pointless. Micheal Blanchet writing for The Advocate Messanger called it "strategically challenging" but heavily criticized the voice additions. Blanchet called the mid-game voice lines "a monotonous litany of witless phrases." Speaking of the vocal congratulations at the end of a round, he found them "cute, but the novelty wears off and it turns irritating." Alan R. Bechtold, editor of The Logical Gamer, considered it to be easier than its predecessor in the early levels and a good option for young children. He thought the programmable mazes were a significant selling point but was disappointed by the voice lines which he thought added nothing to the game. On the other hand, Mike Wilson also writing for The Logical Gamer found it "more engaging than the original" and considered it a "must-buy if you like maze games."

Helge Anderson writing for the German magazine TeleMatch called it a delightful game with appealing graphics that clearly sets itself apart from Pac-Man. French magazine Tilt thought the graphics and animations were top notch for an Odyssey² game and said the game goes out of its way to win you over. British magazine Computer and Video Games called the game "tough", "addictive", and one of the "must get" games for the Videopac G7000.

In 2010, Kotaku published a retrospective review written by Kevin Bunch who said the game was full of personality, which he attributed to the "fun visual effects" and animations. He also called the design "fresh" and "an innovative bent on the maze-gobbler model." Hardcore Gamer in 2007 called K.C.'s Krazy Chase! "pretty good" despite considering the Odyssey²'s library almost entirely "bad ripoffs of popular Atari 2600 games." Brett Weiss in his 2011 book series Classic Home Video Games: A Complete Guide called it "hands down the most enjoyable game in the entire Odyssey² library."

In a reader poll conducted by Videogaming Illustrated in 1983, K.C.'s Krazy Chase! was the runner up for the title of "Best Odyssey Game", ultimately losing to UFO!. K.C.'s Krazy Chase! earned a Certificate of Merit in the category of "1984 Most Humorous Video Game/Computer Game" at the 5th annual Arkie Awards.

== See also ==
- List of Magnavox Odyssey 2 games
