= Alien Invaders - Plus! =

1980 video game

- Developer: Ed Averett
- Publishers: NA: Magnavox; PAL: Philips N.V.
- Programmers: Ed Averett; Linda Averett
- Platforms: Odyssey²/Videopac; Philips Videopac+
- Release: Odyssey²: NA: August 1980; PAL: 1980; Videopac+: PAL: 1983
- Genre: Fixed shooter
- Mode: Single-player

European box art

Alien Invaders - Plus!, known in Europe as Videopac 22 - Space Monster, is a 1980 fixed shooter video game developed by Ed and Linda Averett for the Magnavox Odyssey² also known as the Philips Videopac G7000. Similar to Space Invaders, the object of the game is to destroy all invading aliens while also avoiding enemy fire. It was published by Magnavox and Philips and was later rereleased for the Philips Videopac+ G7400. It reviewed favorably to Space Invaders with some critics considering the starring space monster, The Merciless Monstroth, to be a more interesting adversary. However it was criticized for only having one gameplay mode, contrary to the game's packaging.

== Gameplay ==
The player controls a robot inside of the mobile laser cannon which is used to attack the enemy robots. The Merciless Monstroth (an eye shaped enemy that constantly moves back and forth across the top of the screen) leads the invasion force of 8 robots. The Monolith can be shot but will regenerate after a few seconds. Each robot has a cannon and is protected by an indestructible green shield. The shields constantly move back and forth giving both the player and the enemy the opportunity to fire.

If the player's laser cannon is struck, they will become defenseless unless they retreat to under one of the three large black shields. Once the player fires, the shield will disappear and the laser cannon will reappear. If all three shields are lost, the Merciless Monstroth will engage the player until either all enemies are destroyed or the player is destroyed. If the player destroys all the robots on screen and the Merciless Monolith they earn a point, if the enemies manage to kill the player they earn a point. First side to get ten points wins the game.

== Development & release ==
Alien Invaders - Plus! was developed by Ed Averett with programming assistance from his wife Linda. Ed Averett created the work for Magnavox in exchange for royalties as a freelance developer.

In 1983, the game was rereleased for the Philips Videopac+ G7400 with enhanced graphics.

== Reception ==
Reception

Review scores
| Publication | Score |
|---|---|
| JoyStik | 5/10 |
| Electronic Fun with Computers & Games | C |
| Electronic Games 1983 Software Encyclopedia | 7/10 |
| Tilt | 2/3 |

Alien Invaders - Plus! was reviewed by Video in its "Arcade Alley" column where it was described as "a surprisingly innovative switcheroo on good old Space Invaders". Despite noting that the game has only eight attackers, the reviewers argued that the game "is no pushover". Electronic Games' 1983 Buyers Guide called it "not just a weak-kneed Space Invaders rip-off" and an "exciting and entertaining video game in its own right." Computer and Video Games called the Merciless Monstroth "much more interesting than the unthinking invaders" from Space Invaders.

JoyStik magazine called Alien Invaders - Plus! "actually more of a minus" and considered it a simple game. Creative Computing criticized the packaging for using the phrase "Multi-Mode Game Cartridge" when there is only one gameplay mode with no variations. French magazine Tilt also wished there were more game variations included.

== See also ==
List of Magnavox Odyssey 2 games
