= Attack of the Timelord! =

1982 video game

- Developer: Ed Averett
- Publishers: NA: North American Philips; PAL: Philips N.V.
- Programmers: Ed Averett; Linda Averett
- Platforms: Odyssey²/Videopac; Philips Videopac+
- Release: Odyssey²: NA: December 1982; PAL: October 1983; Videopac+: PAL: 1983
- Genre: Fixed shooter
- Mode: Single-player

Attack of the Timelord!, also known as Terrahawks, is a 1982 fixed shooter video game by Ed and Linda Averett for the Magnavox Odyssey², known in Europe as the Philips Videopac G7000. The player takes the role of a time machine defending against the titular Timelord, Spyrus the Deathless. It was published by Philips who also released it for the Philips Videopac+ G7400. It is compatibile with "The Voice" expansion module for the Odyssey². In Europe, it was released as Terrahawks, based off the Terrahawks television series.

== Gameplay ==
Attack of the Timelord is a fixed shooter in which the player controls a time machine in outer space. At the beginning of each round, Spyrus the Deathless, the Timelord of Chaos appears and creates a time warp in the center of the screen in which enemy time ships appear. These enemy ships form a line that travels around the screen like a snake. Players can destroy individual time ships to earn points and destroying all the time ships on screen will start the next round. Each round, enemy ships become stronger and unlock weapons including missiles, antimatter mines, and player-seeking Annihilators and Nucleonic Time Killers.

If the player is using "The Voice" expansion, each time that the Timelord appears will be accompanied by a voice clip. The Timelord can say a number of different lines including "the earth will be mine" and "defend your world". If the player attains a high enough level, the Timelord will compliment the player with lines like "a commendable defense".

In the European version, the Timelord is replaced with Zelda, the main villian of the Terrahawks television series. Zelda is attacking the Terrahawks base, the Hawknest, and the player is tasked with defending it.

== Development and release ==
The game was designed by husband and wife Ed and Linda Averett and initially developed under the working title Snake Ships from Sirius. The snake-like path of the enemy ships took several months of development on their own.

In Europe, Philips signed a licensing agreement with Gerry Anderson, the producer of Thunderbirds, to sell games based on the then-upcoming series Terrahawks. Philips was already in development on Attack of the Timelord! and decided to market the game as Terrahawks for the British market. The game was set to be debut in Europe at the same time as the TV show in October 1983. Outside of the UK, the game was also released for the Philips Videopac+ G7400 where it received enhanced graphics.

== Reception ==
Reception

Review scores
Publication	Score
Arcade Express	8/10
The Video Game Update	3.5/4

Electronic Games called the game a "technological achievement" and called it one of the best new video games on store shelves. Alan R. Bechtold and Mike Wilson of The Logical Gamer both thought that while the gameplay was smooth, the graphics were subpar for the time and the voice synthesis added little to the experience. Electronic Fun with Computers & Games agreed that the voice synthesis added little and called the game "a poor man's version of Space Invaders". The Video Game Update recommended the game and found the voice samples to be a good "pat on the back" for players.

British magazine Computer and Video Games saw it as a considerable improvement over previous Videopac titles and found it to be "quite addictive" despite being somewhat unoriginal. Fellow British magazine, TV Gamer found it to be quite good compared to other Videopac G7000 titles and compared the game to Galaxian and Phoenix but thought the license was tacked on and pointless. French magazine Tilt called the visual style and constantly changing colors of the Videopac+ version particularly impressive.
