= Quest for the Rings =

1981 video game/board game hybrid

- Developers: Ed Averett; Bradford/Cout Design
- Publishers: NA: Magnavox; PAL: Philips N.V.
- Designer: Steve Lehner
- Programmer: Ed Averett
- Artist: Ron Bradford
- Platform: Odyssey²/Videopac
- Release: NA: July 1981; UK: April 1982; EU: May 1983; BR: January 1984
- Genres: Board game, RPG
- Modes: Single-player, Multi-player

Quest for the Rings (alternatively The Quest for the Rings) is a fantasy themed board game/video game hybrid released in 1981 by Philips for the Magnavox Odyssey² also known as the Philips Videopac G7000. It is the first game in the "Master Strategy" series, a trio of video game/board game hybrids programmed by Ed Averett and designed by Steve Lehner and Rob Bradford for the Odyssey². In addition to the game cartridge, it was shipped with a physical game board and a number of tokens.

Gameplay alternates back in forth between the game board and the television screen. Two players are tasked with working together to collect ten rings while navigating a dungeon and avoiding monsters. Dungeon layouts are determined by reading tokens on the game board and then inputting them with the Odyssey²'s keyboard.

It was released at a significantly higher price then most other video games of the time. Contemporary reviews praised its high quality packaging and saw it as highly innovative. Retrospective reviews found it to be frustrating and better as a novelty than as a game.

== Gameplay ==
Quest for the Rings is ideally played with three players. One player takes the role of Ring Master and hides ten ring tokens and a number of monster tokens underneath 23 castle tokens scattered around the game board. The other two players move together across the game board traveling from castle to castle. When the players reach a castle token, they flip it up to reveal the tokens underneath. The underside of the castle token contains a symbol representing one of four possible dungeon types. The castle token might also hide a ring token and possibly one of two different monster tokens. Players then use a keyboard overlay to input the dungeon symbol and the tokens found underneath into the keyboard.

Players are then taken to a randomly generated dungeon on the Odyssey²'s screen. Players will have to navigate a small maze populated by enemy orcs. If the players found a ring token, they will have the collect a ring placed somewhere in the maze to progress. Otherwise they only have to escape the maze. Both players can choose one of four classes for their on screen characters: A warrior who can kill orcs with a sword, a wizard who can stun monsters with spells, a phantom that can walk through walls, and a changeling who can turn invisible. If the players found a monster token, then those monsters, either nightmare monsters or dragons, join the enemy orcs. They can only be stunned, never killed. Once a dungeon is complete, players return to the board and move on to the next castle token. The goal of the game is for the two players to work together to find and collect all ten rings before a certain number of turns have passed.

== Development ==
The game concept was first pitched in a meeting between Mike Staup, vice president of game development at Magnavox, and Ed Averett who had designed many previous Odyssey² titles. Magnavox had received a lot of feedback from console owning families that enjoyed using the system as a communal activity. Fathers were looking for games that their children could not beat them at and involved a little bit more strategy. Averett found the limited size of the standard 2 KB cartridges to be too restrictive to implement complicated strategy. The introduction of board game elements was intended to solve this problem.

Quest for the Rings was designed by Averett, who handled the video game elements, and Steve Lehner, who handled the board game elements including the mylar sheet used as an overlay for the Odyssey²'s keyboard. Lehner and artist Rob Bradford had previously worked on the materials and packaging for the Magnavox Odyssey and Odyssey² through their marketing firm Bradford/Cout Design out of Skokie, Illinois. According to Lehner, the two of them were looking to go beyond the arcade ports and sports simulations that dominated the console market at the time. According to Averett, attempting to combine video games and board games gave them direction.

Development on the game took nearly half a year. The core of the design was in creating a gameplay loop between the physical board and the computer elements. The goal was to have the state of the board affect the gameplay on screen and vice versa. According to Lehner, they were looking to create "a real synergy between the two". Averett took pride in the fact that the board game action was "a lot more than just a roll of the dice".

== Release ==
Quest for the Rings was first released in 1981 in North America. In addition to the game cartridge itself, it shipped with a full color instruction booklet, a game board, 23 dungeon tokens, 10 ring tokens, six monster tokens, and a keyboard overlay. The packaging was illustrated by Rob Bradford. The game was significantly more expensive than most other games at the time, retailing for about $50 compared to the standard $15 to $20.

The game was planned as the first part in a trilogy of games for the Odyssey² known as the "Master Strategy" series, which also included Conquest of the World and The Great Wall Street Fortune Hunt. The series was intended to make better use out of the Odyssey²'s included computer keyboard. All three games also feature a mix of video game and board game elements.

An April 1982 release was planned in the United Kingdom. It took another year for it to ship to the rest of Europe, showing up in the summer of 1983. In January 1984, the game was released in small quantities in Brazil.

== Reception ==
Reception

Review scores
Publication	Score
Electronic Fun with Computers & Games	A
Electronic Games	10/10
JoyStik	5/5
Tilt	6/6
TeleMatch	5/6

Quest for the Rings was favorably reviewed by Video magazine in its "Arcade Alley" column where it was described as "an instant classic" with "'super hit' stamped all over it in gold letters". The combination of video game and board game elements was considered to be particularly well conceived, producing what the reviewers called "a vigorous new hybrid unlike anything ever seen in home arcading." It was awarded "Most Innovative Game" at the 3rd annual Arkie Awards where it was described as "stand[ing] out like Charlene Tilton at a spinster's convention". Arkie Award judges commented that "every element of Quest is absolutely first-rate from the animation of the various creatures to the clean rules", and the game was additionally awarded an Honorable Mention in the category of "Best Audio-Visual Effects". Electronic Games, edited by the writers of "Arcade Alley" (Bill Kunkel and Arnie Katz), selected the game to be a part of its "Videogame Hall of Fame."

George Sullivan in his 1982 book How to Win at Video Games: A Complete Guide said the graphics were "so exciting that many new players surrender outright the first few times they play, just to be able to watch the monsters romp about the screen." JoyStik magazine liked the packaging and graphics and said it was "well worth its steep price." In October 1982, The Logical Gamer ranked it as "one of the best [fantasy role-playing games] available for any system to date" and "the best [game] that Odyssey has ever produced." David Lubar of Creative Computing was more critical of the game, complimenting the packaging and illustrations but seeing it as "a good idea that, given the limitations of the Odyssey, just doesn't quite make it as a game." He complained about the "slowness and low resolution of the graphics" but liked how the game lived up to the spirit of Dungeons and Dragons by being a cooperative game.

French magazine Tilt called it exciting and thought it was a clever way to overcome the Odyssey²'s lack of graphical power. They called it a reinvention of the concept of a video game. German magazine TeleMatch said it was a "complex adventure" and a whole lot of fun. Brazilian newspaper Folha de S.Paulo thought the game was packaged well but the graphics didn't compare well with other games released at the time.

In a retrospective 2011 review, Hardcore Gaming 101 considered Quest for the Rings to be an "interesting novelty, but not a good game by any means." They considered it to be "too frustrating" and found the enemies to be too difficult to kill or avoid. They considered it an inferior experience to tabletop role-playing games and thought the video component didn't add much to the game.

== See also ==
- List of Magnavox Odyssey 2 games
