= UFO! =

1981 video game

- Developer: Ed Averett
- Publishers: NA: Magnavox; PAL: Philips N.V.
- Programmers: Ed Averett; Linda Averett
- Platforms: Odyssey²/Videopac; Philips Videopac+
- Release: Odyssey²: NA: May 1981; PAL: 1981; Videopac+: PAL: 1983
- Genre: Multidirectional shooter
- Mode: Single-player

UFO!, released in Europe as Videopac 34 - Satellite Attack, is a 1981 multidirectional shooter video game created by Ed Averett for the Magnavox Odyssey² otherwise known as the Philips Videopac G7000. Players take control of a flying saucer tasked with destroying swarms of enemy unidentified flying objects in outer space. It was published by Magnavox in North America and Philips in Europe and Brazil. It was also later released for the Philips Videopac+ G7400 in 1983. The game is frequently compared to Atari's 1979 video game Asteroids.

== Gameplay ==
Players assume control of a robot piloted space ship sent into space by an organization called the Earth Federation. The player is tasked with destroying an endless swarm of attacking UFOs which come in three varieties: random moving UFOs which wander the screen randomly, hunter-killers which track the player's movement, and light-speed ships which can fire missiles at the player. The player's space ship, called the battle cruiser, has a laser cannon which can be fired in fifteen different directions to destroy enemies. When enemies are destroyed they launch three more missiles in different directions, leaving open the potential for chain reactions.

Fifteen dots surrounding the battle cruiser deplete every time the laser cannon is used and recharge slowly over time. The dots also serve as a shield that destroys enemies and absorbs enemy missiles on contact. The shield deactivates briefly upon use or after all fifteen shots have been fired, leaving the player vulnerable. The player also moves half as fast while shields are depleted. The goal is to acquire as many points as possible by destroying enemy ships. Random moving ships earn one point, hunter-killers earn three points, and light-speed ships earn ten points.

== Development & release ==
UFO! was developed by Ed Averett with programming assistance from his wife Linda. Ed Averett created the work for Magnavox in exchange for royalties as a freelance developer.

In 1983, the game was rereleased for the Philips Videopac+ G7400 with enhanced graphics.

== Reception ==
Reception

Review scores
Publication	Score
JoyStik	3/5
Electronic Fun with Computers & Games	C
Electronic Games 1983 Software Encyclopedia	9/10
Tilt	3/6

Video magazine column Arcade Alley, written by Bill Kunkel and Arnie Katz, said UFO! "sparkles with audio and visual effects". In their third Annual Arcade Awards, they pronounced the game as the "Best Science Fiction Game" of 1981. Electronic Games, also edited by Kunkel and Katz, thought the game would be well loved by fans of on-screen explosions. UFO! was voted the "Best Odyssey Game" by a community poll ran by Videogaming Illustrated. It won over half the votes and was praised by voters for the variety of methods for destroying ships.

Craig Kubey the author of The Winner's Book of Video Games agreed with his technical advisor that the game was the best of the ten Odyssey² games that they played. JoyStik magazine called it a "well-done version of Asteroids" but thought the graphics were lackluster. British magazine Computer and Video Games and French magazine Tilt both considered Satellite Attack to be highly derivative of Asteroids.
