= K.C. Munchkin! =

1981 video game

- Developer: Ed Averett
- Publishers: NA: North American Philips; PAL: Philips N.V.
- Platforms: Odyssey²/Videopac; Philips VG5000
- Release: November 1981: Odyssey² November 1981 VG5000 1984
- Genre: Maze
- Mode: Single-player

K.C. Munchkin!, released in Europe as Videopac 38 - Munchkin, is a 1981 maze game created by Ed Averett for the Magnavox Odyssey², also known as the Philips Videopac G7000. Players control a blue alien named K.C. who navigates a maze while eating pellets and avoiding enemy aliens. It was published by North American Philips (N.A.P.), who were sued by Atari over the game's resemblance to the arcade game Pac-Man. The ensuing court case, which was a landmark ruling in video game copyright law, found K.C. Munchkin! to be too close in "look and feel" to the arcade game causing it to be pulled from the market. At that point, it was the best selling game yet released for the Odyssey².

It was created to cash in on the success of Pac-Man, and was designed to be as close to the original as possible without crossing the legal line. The success of the game was a catalyst which inspired further video game development at Philips. It was one of the first home console video games to receive a sequel, K.C.'s Krazy Chase!, which released in 1982. Its North American title is an inside reference to then president of North American Philips Consumer Electronics, Kenneth C. Meinken Jr.

The preliminary injunction which pulled the game from stores was initially shot down by the courts, but granted on appeal on March 2, 1982. In the same month, Atari released its own version of Pac-Man for the Atari 2600, which critics overwhelmingly consider to be inferior to K.C. Munchkin. Critics praise the charming character animation and its customizable maze feature. Multiple retrospective reviews consider it to be one of the best Pac-Man clones ever created.

== Gameplay ==
K.C. navigating a maze filled with munchies and munchers

K.C. Munchkin! plays very similarly to Pac-Man. The player character K.C. roams a maze with the goal of eating pellets called munchies while avoiding ghost-like aliens called munchers. The maze contains twelve munchies, four of which flash a variety of colors. Collecting all twelve resets the maze and starts a new round. The munchies can move throughout the maze and move faster each time another munchie is consumed. The last remaining munchie moves as fast as K.C., meaning it needs to be trapped or outsmarted by the player.

The maze also contains three munchers, who spawn from a rotating box in the center and hunt K.C. down. Eating a flashing munchie makes the munchers temporarily vulnerable, allowing K.C. to eat them for points. If the eaten muncher manages to make its way back to the rotating box in the center, it gets recharged and can hunt K.C. again. Unlike Pac-Man, players lose all of their points on every death and don't have any extra lives.

There are four different pre-built maze layouts that players can choose from upon starting the game. Players can also choose to play with walls that turn invisible while K.C. is moving. The game includes a custom maze feature, which allows players to build their own mazes using the Odyssey²'s keyboard.

== Development ==
K.C. Munchkin! was designed and programmed by Ed Averett, an independent contractor based out of Chattanooga, Tennessee. At the time, Averett was the only developer working on Odyssey² games in the United States. Previous to this, Averett had developed 21 other games for the Odyssey². It was published by Magnavox Consumer Electronics, which had recently been renamed to the North American Philips Consumer Electronics Corporation (N.A.P.C.E.C.) by its parent, North American Philips. In Europe, it was published by N.A.P.'s Dutch counterpart, Philips N.V. The instruction manual and packaging were created by Steve Lehner and Rob Bradford of Bradford/Cout Design based out of Skokie, Illinois.

Averett and Mike Staup, a N.A.P.C.E.C. executive in charge of game development, testified to having first seen Pac-Man in an airport arcade. They discussed the game and its success and decided to create a version for the Odyssey². Staup initially sought to acquire a home console license for Pac-Man from Midway Games, but hadn't realized the license had already been acquired by Atari. By the time Staup informed Averett about the licensing issues, K.C. Munchkin! was already under development. Averett had played Pac-Man at least once before development started, but as the two games shared entirely separate hardware, no code was copied between them.

According to Averett, he was then asked to design "a game that would compete with the game concept of Pac-Man without violating copyright laws." There were three different parties with design expectations: the marketing department which wanted a game as close to Pac-Man as legally allowed, the legal department which wanted something they could defend in court, and Averett himself who wanted "a game that would eat Pac-Man's lunch from an interactive play point of view." Averett says everyone involved was pleased with the end results. N.A.P. concluded in its own investigation that it was totally different from Pac-Man but decided to change K.C. from yellow to blue to make their case stronger. Averett claims the moving pellets were inspired by his work as a sales representative for Intel, in which he would use a scanning electron microscope to demonstrate microprocessor technology to prospective clients. The electron beam would run down the traces of an Intel 8048 in a manner similar to the in-game pellets.

Averett saw his work as unique compared to Pac-Man because "the character and challenges were different. The player was not controlling a robotic 'chomper' but a character that interacted and made you smile." He recalls comparing his work to television westerns which often have similar settings, tropes, and plot points but "you knew if you were watching The Lone Ranger or watching a Roy Rogers western. There were observable differences."

K.C. Munchkin was named after then president of N.A.P.C.E.C. formerly Magnavox, Kenneth C. Meinken Jr. Averett claims the name was chosen as a way to include upper management who were ambivalent at the time to their video game projects. According to Averett, Meinken was initially unsure about the name choice, but was a big fan following the game's success. After the lawsuit, Meinken was reportedly not pleased to have his name attached to the outcome.

== Release ==
K.C. Munchkin! released in North America in late 1981, and quickly became a commercial success. According to N.A.P. spokesperson Ed Williams, in its first two months it outsold every previously released Odyssey² cartridge combined. Ed Averett claimed in 2014 that it was the best selling game on the console. One factor driving this success was that it was the first home console video game to imitate Pac-Man, releasing earlier than Atari's own version for the Atari 2600 in March 1982. Advertising occasionally compared the two games directly, with some retailers calling K.C. Munchkin "as challenging as Pac-Man" or even just "a Pac-Man game". Averett credits the success of the game with revitalizing efforts from North American Philips with the Odyssey², which had frequently been on the brink of discontinuation. This involved a new crew of programmers hired by N.A.P., the release of later Challenger Series entries such as Pick Axe Pete! and Killer Bees!, and the development of the console's ill-fated follow-up, the Odyssey 3.

It was available by May 1982 in Europe, released there as Munchkin. It was the 38th numbered Videopac cartridge. In October 1982, a sequel was released titled K.C.'s Krazy Chase!. It was one of the first sequels to be released for a home console video game. In Brazil, K.C. Munchkin! released as Come-Come II, now framed as a sequel to K.C.'s Krazy Chase! (which was released as the original Come-Come in that region). A version was created for the Philips VG5000, a computer released exclusively in Europe in 1984, where it was an early cartridge release.

As of 2026, Ed Averett holds the rights to the K.C. character. Averett developed a DNA-based educational game called K.C. Returns! released for Windows 8 and Windows 10 in 2017. In 2020, another follow-up was released titled K.C. Returns! II, which was inspired by the COVID-19 pandemic.

== Lawsuit ==
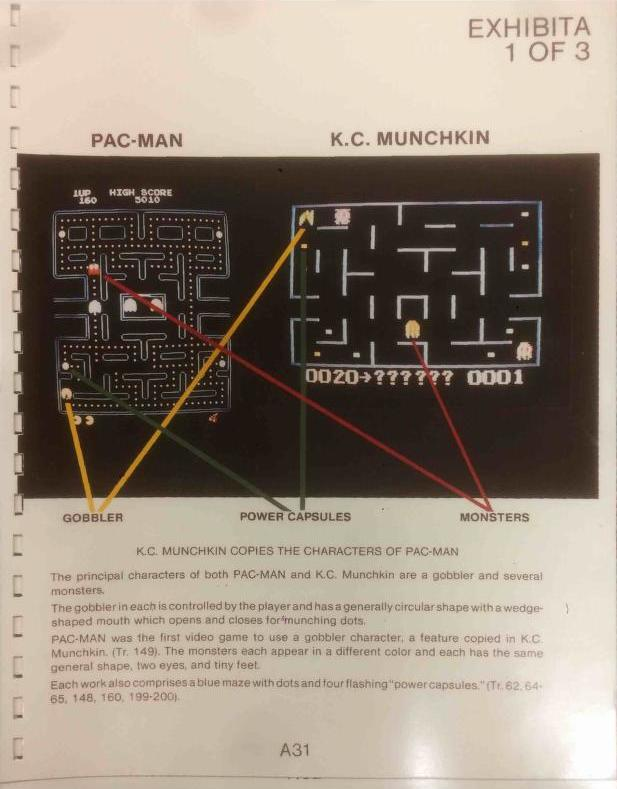
An exhibit filed by Atari, illustrating some of the similarities between Pac-Man and K.C. Munchkin!

As the holders of the home console rights to Pac-Man, Atari Inc. sued North American Philips in 1981 over copyright infringement. Atari sought a preliminary injunction to prevent future K.C. Munchkin! sales, but the motion was denied in trial court. Atari appealed the ruling to the United States Court of Appeals for the Seventh Circuit, which ruled in Atari's favor on March 2, 1982. This effectively barred all future sales of K.C. Munchkin! in the United States.

According to Averett, Philips lawyers were initially very confident they would win the trial in part because no actual programming or artwork had been copied from the original arcade game. On appeal, Atari was successfully able to leverage the fact that Averett had access to Pac-Man prior to K.C. Munchkin's development and the substantial similarity of the two products, i.e. their similar "look and feel". During the course of the trial, Electronic Games editor Bill Kunkel was called in as an expert witness on behalf of Philips.

The case was one of the first to involve copyright law as it applied to video games and set a landmark ruling in that area. As a result of the ruling, other Pac-Man clones such as Packri-Monster, Puckman, and Mighty Mouth also faced injunctions. The case was cited in later pivotal cases such as Data East USA, Inc. v. Epyx, Inc. and Capcom U.S.A. Inc. v. Data East Corp. The Emory Law Journal cited the case as evidence that "only a moderate degree of similarity need be required to support a claim of infringement". Following the lawsuit, many speculated that K.C. Munchkin! copies would become valuable collector's items. However, the game's high sales meant that cartridges remained fairly common.

== Reception ==
Electronic Games, written by Bill Kunkel and Arnie Katz, said K.C. Munchkin! was an "amusing twist on the gobble game theme" but also that it was "maybe just a little too easy". In their 1983 Software Encyclopedia, Kunkel and Katz gave it a nine out of ten, calling the gameplay "outstanding" and complimenting the custom maze feature. Videogaming Illustrated called it "delightful" while bemoaning its removal from the market. JoyStik magazine thought it offered "cleaner graphics" and "more challenging gameplay" compared to the Atari 2600 version of Pac-Man. They also believed the extra gameplay modes and customizable mazes brought the game above its competitor.

Randi Hacker writing for Video Games said that K.C. Munchkin was better than Atari's Pac-Man but not "so much better." They thought K.C. was a charming character and the sound effects were appealing. Hacker thought bad controls were "a good enough reason not to bother much with either game." Editor of The Logical Gamer, Alan R. Bechtold, thought that it didn't deserve to be taken off the market and that it had enough of its own twists for it to be considered a new game. As of August 1982, it was his favorite home console game.

Writing in 2011, Brett Weiss called K.C. Munchkin! "one of the best Pac-Man copycats for any system of any era." Levi Buchanan writing for IGN ranked it as the third best Pac-Man clone, behind Snack Attack and 3-Demon. Martin Woger, editor in chief of Eurogamer.de, thought it was one of Ed Averett's greatest design successes and that it was even better than the original Pac-Man. Earl Green writing for Classic Gamer Magazine said it "wasn't a bad game" but that it was very clearly "Pac-Man painted blue."

== See also ==
- List of Magnavox Odyssey² games
- List of Pac-Man clones
