= Type & Tell! =

1982 video game

- Developer: North American Philips
- Publisher: North American Philips
- Designer: Robert Cheezum
- Platform: Magnavox Odyssey²
- Release: NA: September 1982
- Genre: Speech synthesis

Type and Tell! is a speech synthesis program released in 1982 for the Magnavox Odyssey². It was designed by Robert Cheezum for North American Philips and released exclusively in North America as a launch title for the Odyssey²'s voice synthesis module, "The Voice of Odyssey²". Users can enter a short phrase which the voice module will attempt to read. Critics thought it was too simple to hold anyone's attention for long but were entertained by getting the voice module to say a wide variety of things.

== Gameplay ==
Type & Tell! is a program which allows the player to enter a short text message using the keyboard. When the enter key is press, "The Voice of Odyssey²" attempts to render the players message into speech. The message can be a maximum length of 72 letters. The manual also suggests four games that one or more players might try with the base program. "Garble" has players attempt to create sentences using the names of letters, "Sound Waves" has players create sounds using repeated letters, "Super Star!" has players use Type & Tell! to generate sound effects for a home movie, and "War of Words!" has players alternate words to attempt to create a valid sentence.

== Reception ==
Alan R. Bechtold of The Logical Gamer thought it was "a beautiful idea" but added "you want to type messages to yourself. Buy a nice tape recorder, and the playback will be more true-to-life." Mike Wilson liked it as an introduction to the Voice module but thought it wasn't a very good learning aid due to the poor reading quality. The Video Game Update thought it could be an interesting educational tool but doubted that the suggested games in the manual would hold anyone's attention for long. Electronic Fun with Computers & Games said 'after ten minutes of hearing your video game say things to you that would make a longshoreman blush, you might begin to realize the incredible educational possibilities of this "game."' Michael Blanchet, a syndicated newspaper columnist, found getting a correct pronunciation of his name to be a fun challenge. He thought the best entertainment value came in attempting to create sound effects, such as inputting a series of "Q"s to produce a chugging train sound.

== See Also ==
- Sid the Spellbinder!
- Nimble Numbers Ned!
- List of Magnavox Odyssey 2 games
