= Showdown in 2100 A.D. =

1979 video game

- Developer: Ed Averett
- Publishers: NA: Magnavox; PAL: Philips N.V.
- Platform: Odyssey²/Videopac
- Release: NA: August 1979; PAL: 1980
- Genre: Multidirectional shooter
- Mode: Multi-player

Showdown in 2100 A.D., known in Europe as Videopac 14 - Gunfighter is a 1979 multidirectional shooter video game created by Ed Averett and published by Magnavox and Philips for the Magnavox Odyssey², also known as the Philips Videopac G7000. The game is set in a futuristic version of the old west. Two gunfighters face one another across a field filled with trees, similar to Midway's Gun Fight.

== Gameplay ==
The object of the game is to shoot the other player's gunfighter. The first player to hit the other gunfighter ten times wins. The trees add some challenge to the game by deflecting bullets fired at them, sometimes even back at the gunfighter who originally fired. At close range it is possible to shoot through the trees. Each gunfighter has six bullets, and more ammunition is hidden in the tree which matches the color of the player's outfit. Each gunfighter can reload at any time by touching the tree where his bullets are hidden.

== Reception ==
Reception

Review scores
Publication	Score
Electronic Fun with Computers & Games	B−
Electronic Games 1983 Software Encyclopedia	8/10
Tilt	2/3

Paul Kupperberg writing for Video Action called the game concept a bit of a stretch and also said, "the intention, if not the action, of Showdown in 2100 A.D. is fine indeed". David Lubar of Creative Computing said it "was fairly entertaining, though the gunfighters had a tendency to jump about the screen a bit". French magazine Tilt thought the game could have used more variations but enjoyed the way gunfighters fall down when they get shot.
