= Freedom Fighters! =

1982 video game

- Developer: Ed Averett (Note: As listed on the cartridge.)
- Publishers: NA: North American Philips; PAL: Philips N.V.
- Platforms: Odyssey²/Videopac; Philips Videopac+
- Release: Odyssey²: NA: May 1982; PAL: 1982; Videopac+: PAL: 1983
- Genre: Scrolling shooter
- Modes: Single-player, Multi-player

Freedom Fighters!, released in Europe as Videopac 39 - Freedom Fighters, is a 1982 horizontally scrolling shooter video game written by Ed Averett for the Magnavox Odyssey² also known as the Philips Videopac G7000. Two players must defeat waves of enemies while cooperatively controlling a single space ship. One player controls the ship's position on screen while the other controls the ship's scrolling and speed. It was also released for the Philips Videopac+ G7400. The game was praised at the time of its release for being fast paced and fun, but the game's unique control scheme has been a focal point for criticism. It is also frequently compared to Defender.

== Gameplay ==
Freedom Fighters! is a horizontally scrolling shooter set in outer space. Players control a space ship and earn points by destroying alien space ships, including the pulsar warships, which resemble asterisks, and drone mines which spawn from the warships. Destroying a ship using the space ship's laser cannon also releases shrapnel which can also kill the player. Players also earn points by rescuing shipmates who have been trapped by the enemy aliens in purple prison crystals. These crystals float about the play area and can be collected to earn 20 points.

A gameplay screenshot showing a variety of enemies and the player ship in green scrolling to the left

The game features a unique control scheme in which both the player one and player two joysticks are required to move the ship. The intention being that two players need to work together to pilot the space ship (although it is possible to use both joysticks as one player). While the ship is blue, the first player's controller can only be used to move within the bounds of the current screen. When the second player's joystick is used, the ship's hyperspace drive is activated and screen will start to scroll either to the left or the right. While the hyperspace drive is active, the ship will turn green and only the second player's controller will be able to control movement. Both players can fire the ships laser cannon.

== Reception ==
Reception

Review scores
Publication	Score
Arcade Express	7/10
Electronic Fun with Computers & Games	A−
Electronic Games 1983 Software Encyclopedia	8/10
JoyStik	4/5

Alan R. Bechtold of The Logical Gamer wrote that the game was better looking and more complex and challenging compared to UFO!. On the two player control scheme, he thought it took a lot of getting used to but was really rewarding when mastered. Bechtold's co-reviewer Mike Wilson thought the unique control scheme could have been done away with entirely but thought it was an "excellent choice" and would provide players with "a lot of fun". Arcade Express thought it wasn't quite as thrilling as UFO! but that it was still a good addition to the Odyssey²'s library. JoyStik magazine considered it an "exciting Defender variant" and thought its "blistering action more than makes up for its barely average graphic presentation." They also called the controller action "superb."

German magazine TeleMatch said that while it was reminiscent of Defender, the game was still the "game of games" for Videopac G7000 owners. French magazine Tilt called the two player control scheme an unprecedented feature and called the game a complete package with graphics that were simple but effective. In 2011, Brett Weiss considered the two joystick control scheme to be "clumsily executed". He went on to say that it "contains elements of Defender and Asteroids, but the awkward control system makes it tough to recommend."
