= Monkeyshines! =

1981 video game

- Developer: Ed Averett (Note: As listed on the cartridge.)
- Publishers: NA: North American Philips; PAL: Philips N.V.
- Platform: Odyssey²/Videopac
- Release: NA: November 1981; PAL: June 1982
- Genres: Platform, maze
- Mode: Multi-player

Monkeyshines!, released in Europe as Videopac 37 - Monkeyshines, is a 1981 maze platform game written by Ed Averett and published by Philips for the Magnavox Odyssey² also known as the Philips Videopac G7000. It is a game for young children, in which two players compete or coordinate with each other to challenge four monkeys to a game of tag.

== Gameplay ==
In Monkeyshines, two players control characters that can move and jump to navigate a vertical maze. Players aim to catch one of the four monkeys roaming the maze. Players can grab a monkey by walking over one and can press the action button and a direction to throw the monkey in that direction, earning that player a point. Once a monkey is thrown, it will turn red and start chasing the players. If a red monkey catches a player, they will be frozen until both players are frozen and the round resets. Players can only jump up one platform at a time but can stand on each other's shoulders to get higher.

Different game variations allow the maze to be altered in real time using the Odyssey²'s keyboard. "Monkey Chess" allows a player to add or remove walls in the maze by pressing specific keys on the keyboard. "Tailspin" causes the maze to shift at regular intervals. "Shuteye" causes the maze to turn invisible unless a key is pressed on the keyboard. The last mode, "Bananas" is a combination of all three.

== Reception ==
Reception

Review scores
Publication	Score
Electronic Fun with Computers & Games	3/4
JoyStik	3/5
Tilt	3/6

JoyStik magazine called Monkeyshines! an "amusing game" and thought the many game variations kept it fresh, despite the basic gameplay and graphics. In another review, they called it "a good game for beginners". Electronic Fun with Computers & Games called the gameplay "catchy in its simplicity" and said the monkeys have "a charm and a naturalness of movement not unlike the real things." They also found the fact that the game required the use of two controllers even with only one player to be confusing and difficult to manage.

British magazine Computer and Video Games found Monkeyshines to lose its appeal after mastering the controls but considered that young children might enjoy the game for longer. French magazine Tilt compared the game to an inverted Pac-Man, where players start out chasing their foe and then end up getting chased in return. They found this to be a good mix of classic design and original ideas.
