= Sid the Spellbinder! =

1982 video game

- Official box art
- Developer: Odyssey Software Development Group
- Publisher: North American Philips
- Designer: Sam Overton
- Platform: Magnavox Odyssey²
- Release: NA: November 1982
- Genres: Education, Fixed shooter
- Mode: Single-player

Sid the Spellbinder!, also known as S.I.D. the Spellbinder!, is an 1982 educational fixed shooter video game released by North American Philips for the Magnavox Odyssey². It was developed by Sam Overton, the manager of the recently founded Odyssey Software Development Group. It was designed to help children aged six to ten learn English spelling and was designed in association with the College of Education at University of Tennessee, Knoxville. It was also designed to make use of "The Voice of Odyssey²", a recently released expansion module that produces a synthesized voice during gameplay.

Players control a missile cannon that shoots at a slowly approaching centipede named Sid. Players have to shoot Sid without losing all their missiles, which they can receive more of by answering spelling questions correctly in-between rounds. It came with a "Sid the Spellbinder Word Book" which provided all the words used in game in context so players could study. While some criticize it for being to lenient and the voice synthesis being to hard to understand, most critics praised it highly as both a fun game and a good educational tool.

== Gameplay ==
Sid the Spellbinder! is a fixed shooter that intersperses its level with spelling challenges. It was designed for children aged six to ten. Sid is a centipede that crawls across the screen slowly working his way down to the player. The player uses a missile cannon fixed to the bottom of the screen to shoot away segments of Sid's body. If Sid reaches the bottom of the screen, he will eat five of the players missiles for each segment that remains. The game ends when the player is out of missiles.

Once every body segment has been eliminated, "The Voice of Odyssey²" module will ask the player to spell three words with the keyboard. If they guess correctly, the receive extra missiles. Players get two attempts at each word, if the players misses both attempts play continues with no extra missiles. Each round, Sid moves faster and the words become harder. Included with the game is a booklet titled the "Sid the Spellbinder Word Book" which includes all the words used and allows the player to study between attempts.

== Development & release ==
Sid the Spellbinder! was designed by Sam Overton. Overton had previously worked for North American Philips Consumer Electronics Company (N.A.P.C.E.C.), then called Magnavox, during the initial development of the Odyssey². Following its launch, he left to work for Milton Bradley. In 1982, Overton was rehired to lead a new software development team known as the Odyssey Software Development Group or Odyssey West. Overton developed Sid the Spellbinder! while leading this new group. It was designed to be compatiable with "The Voice of Odyssey²" expansion module which provided synthesized sound and voice clips for the player released in September 1982. According to the manual, it was created in collaboration with the College of Education at University of Tennessee, Knoxville. It released in November 1982 exclusively in North America.

== Reception ==
Editor of The Logical Gamer, Alan R. Bechtold thought it was "an excellent game" that used the Voice module well and is a good learning tool. Though he didn't expect that adults would get any enjoyment out of it. Bechtold's co-reviewer Mike Wilson agreed, though he cautioned the voice was hard to understand at first. He also gave it to his seven year old daughter who reportedly enjoyed it. Jim Clark of Videogaming Illustrated, thought it was a "brilliant melding of keyboard, Voice, video game action, and the print medium" and thought it should be "required software in all elementary schools." E.C. Meade added that he thought it should be in high schools as well. Computer Entertainer quarreled with players being allowed to continue playing even if they miss a word. They also thought the robotic voice was hard to understand. They still thought it was an "enjoyable way for children to improve their spelling skills." In 2007, Brett Weiss called it "one of the most enjoyable educational titles" of its time due its fast paced gameplay.

== See Also ==
- Type & Tell!
- Nimble Numbers Ned!
- List of Magnavox Odyssey 2 games
