= Atari, Inc. v. North American Philips Consumer Electronics Corp. =

1982 legal case

- Court: United States Court of Appeals for the Seventh Circuit
- Decided: March 2, 1982
- Citation: 672 F.2d 607 (7th Cir. 1982)

Court membership
- Judges sitting: Harlington Wood, Myron L. Gordon, Jesse E. Eschbach

Case opinions
- Majority: Wood, joined by unanimous

Keywords
- Copyright infringement

Atari, Inc. v. North American Philips Consumer Electronics Corp., 672 F.2d 607 (7th Cir. 1982), is one of the first legal cases applying copyright law to video games, barring sales of the game K.C. Munchkin! for its similarities to Pac-Man. Atari had licensed the commercially successful arcade game Pac-Man from Namco and Midway, to produce a version for their Atari 2600 console. Around the same time, Philips created Munchkin as a similar maze chase game, leading Atari to sue them for copyright infringement.

Relevant copyright case law was limited at the time, disputing whether video game graphics even qualified as fixed audiovisual works, as seen in traditional games. Courts were consistently finding for plaintiffs, that games qualified for copyright protection, both as audiovisual works and for their underlying code. However, Atari Inc. v. Amusement World was a leading case where courts decided for the defendant, based on the idea-expression distinction that copyright cannot protect the idea for a game, only the game's unique expression.

In Atari v Philips, the district court refused Atari's motion to bar the sales of Munchkin. But Atari succeeded on appeal, with Judge Harlington Wood applying the abstraction test to find that Munchkin had likely copied the unique expression of Pac-Man, particularly the character design. The appeal court thus ordered a preliminary injunction, forcing Philips to bar sales of Munchkin for the duration of the case. Philips attempted to appeal the decision to the Supreme Court, but they refused to hear the case, by which point Philips had already published a sequel.

While the decision establishes that copyright protection does apply to expressive content in video games, it also noted that common ideas cannot be protected by copyright. This paved the way for cases such as Data East v. Epyx (1988) and Capcom U.S.A. Inc. v. Data East Corp. (1994), which found no infringement under the same idea-expression principle. With more recent cases such as Tetris Holding, LLC v. Xio Interactive, Inc. finding infringement once again, legal scholars have described the idea-expression distinction as easy to state, but difficult to apply.

== Background ==
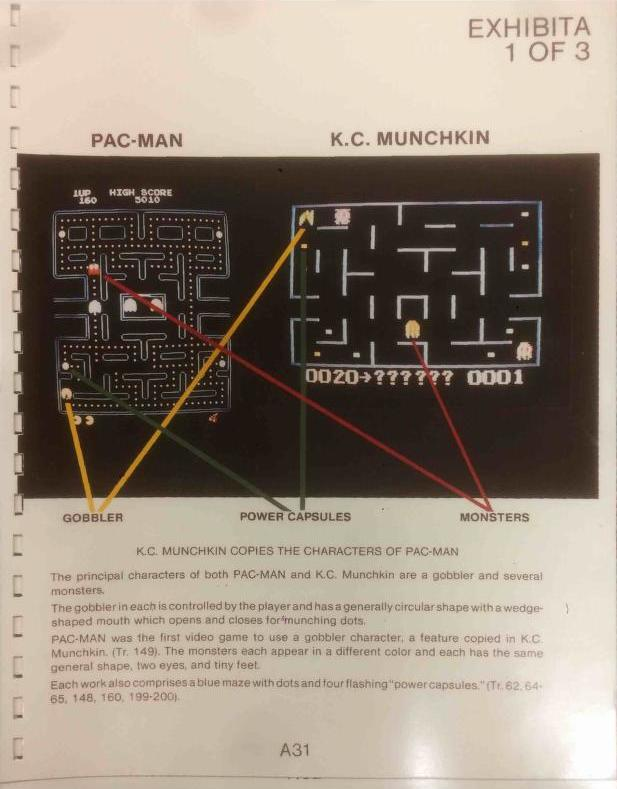
An exhibit filed by the plaintiff in 1981, illustrating some of the similarities between Pac-Man and the alleged clone, K.C. Munchkin!

=== Facts ===
Around 1980, numerous arcade games were being adapted for home consoles. Namco created the arcade game Pac-Man in Japan, which was adapted by Midway Manufacturing in America. The game became a mass market success, leading to game sequels, merchandising, and a cartoon. Just between October 1980 and December 1981, the game generated $150 million in sales. Atari licensed the rights to produce a home version of Pac-Man for the Atari 2600. Philips recognized the success of Pac-Man and attempted to create their own maze game, resulting in K.C. Munchkin! released in 1981. K.C. Munchkin was released before Atari was able to publish their home version of Pac-Man, and highlighted the similarities to take advantage of consumer excitement. When the home version of Pac-Man was panned by critics and consumers, both K.C. Munchkin and the Magnavox Odyssey 2 were bolstered by the news.

Pac-Man featured four ghosts chasing the titular Pac-Man, a yellow circular character eating his way through a maze. Pac-Man can eat hundreds of "dots" that line the pathways of a maze, as well as four larger dots called power capsules. Each round of play ends if one of the ghosts catches Pac-Man, but Pac-Man has a brief chance to eat a ghost if he consumes a power capsule. The player's goal is to reach a high score by consuming dots, fruit, and power capsules.

K.C. Munchkin! was inspired by Pac-Man, with the programmer Ed Averett playing Pac-Man at least once before starting development. Both are maze chase video games where the player directs their "gobbler" character to consume dots while avoiding monsters. Both games also allow the character to eat the monster after consuming a power capsule, as well as similar scoring and game over conditions. However, there were several differences between the games, where Munchkin's maze shifted during gameplay, and the power-up "dots" moved to avoid being eaten. The games also feature different numbers and placement of dots, with Munckin featuring rectangular dots that are randomly placed. There are additional design differences between the characters, with Munchkin's character having horns and eyes, and appearing green instead of yellow. The monsters in Munchkins are also distinguished by their short antennae, though they have similar eyes and legs.

Philips argued that K.C. Munchkin was "totally different". Despite their differences, the public recognized many similarities between the games. The advertising for Munchkin openly compared the game to Pac-Man, and private investigators found that retailers were making the same comparisons to their customers. Both Atari and Midway sued Philips for copyright infringement, also filing a motion for a preliminary injunction to halt sales of Munchkin.

=== Law ===
In 1982, there were few other cases applying copyright law to video games. Copyright law had been applied more consistently to traditional games, with courts establishing that copyright law could extend to a game's graphics, but not utilitarian features such as rules of play. At the time, it was unclear how to apply traditional game principles to video games, as their rules of play had been literally non-existent until a few years prior.

The first video game cases raised the issue of whether a video game's graphics counted as a fixed work, an essential first step for copyright protection. Courts consistently ruled for the plaintiffs, that copyright indeed protected games as audiovisual works, more than protecting the underlying code. However, Atari Inc. v. Amusement World was a notable early case for its deeper analysis of twenty-two design similarities between Asteroids and its alleged clone, Meteors. Despite these similarities, the court ruled that these features were not protected by copyright, as they were essential to the overall idea of shooting down space rocks with a spaceship. At the time, it was one of the only cases to rule in favor of the defendant, based on the idea-expression distinction that copyright does not protect broad ideas, only the unique expression. In the case of Pac-Man and Munchkin, the court would need to examine the audiovisual elements of Pac-Man and determine which parts counted as protectable forms of expression.

== Ruling on motion ==
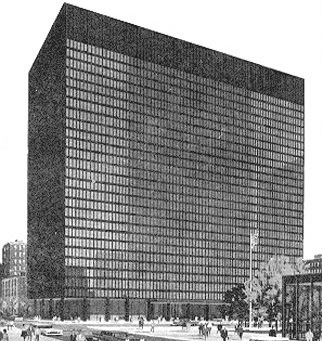
Atari appealed the trial motion to the United States Court of Appeals for the Seventh Circuit, pictured above.

At trial, game journalist Bill Kunkel was called as an expert witness, testifying on behalf of Philips that Munchkin was not infringing. The trial court denied Atari's motion for a preliminary injunction, deciding that Atari had not proven a likelihood of success at trial. As there was no evidence that Philips had directly copied Pac-Man, Atari would need to prove copying by showing that Philips had access to Pac-Man and that the two games were substantially similar. Since the question of access was not contested, the case would hinge on whether K.C. Munchkin was substantially similar to the legally protected parts of Pac-Man.

Atari appealed the motion to the United States Court of Appeals for the Seventh Circuit, with the appeal decided on March 2, 1982. This time, the court ruled in Atari's favor, explaining that "it is enough that substantial parts were lifted; no plagiarist can excuse the wrong by showing how much of his work he did not pirate." Judge Harlington Wood applied idea-expression principles from a notable film case, Nichols v. Universal Pictures Corp., including what he referred to as the "abstractions test".

While Atari cannot prevent competitors from making any maze-chase game, the court established that Atari could prevent competitors from making games that are substantially similar in expression to Pac-Man. This meant that Atari could not protect broad ideas such as opponents chasing a character through a maze, let alone other elements essential to that idea, such as scoring, dots, or tunnel exits. However, copyright protection was granted to non-essential elements, such as the Pac-Man "gobbler" character, as well as the design of the ghost monsters. The court concluded that an "ordinary observer" would see that Munchkin had copied from Pac-Man, and infringement did not require an exact reproduction. This led them to reverse the decision of the lower court, ordering a preliminary injunction against the continued infringement on the copyright of Pac-Man.

== Effects ==
After the injunction was granted by the United States Court of Appeals, Philips was legally barred from selling K.C. Munchkin. Since the appeal court awarded the injunction based on their finding that Atari was likely to succeed at trial, this finding typically leads to the end of a legal dispute. Philips attempted to appeal the order to the Supreme Court of the United States, but the Supreme Court declined to hear the case. By this point, the developers of K.C. Munchkin had already released a successor called K.C.'s Krazy Chase. Meanwhile, other Odyssey games were modified to avoid any potential infringement, such the game Pickaxe Pete, initially modelled after Donkey Kong.

Though Atari had been unsuccessful in barring an alleged Asteroids clone in the case Atari v. Amusement World, they vowed that they would use their "war chest" to protect their games from infringement. Midway likewise announced that they would chase down any look-a-like games. In similar pre-trial motions, Courts would later bar other clones of Pac-Man, including Packri-Monster by Bandai, Puckman by Artic International, and another similar game called Mighty Mouth. Meanwhile, Atari and Online Systems settled a dispute out of court, negotiating a licensing agreement that allowed them to continue selling their maze-chase game, Jawbreaker. Some game critics would note that K.C. Munchkin was a better game than the Atari-port of Pac-Man, leading to increased sales in the collector's market even after its removal from stores.

In 1982, the magazine Video Games Player noted the increasing number of video game clones and the lawsuits against them, especially Pac-Man, and argued that eliminating low quality clones would be good for consumers. The same year, the University of Pennsylvania Law Review noted Atari v. Philips as the leading decision about copyright in video games, but warned that the injunction risked an "all-or-nothing" approach, suggesting an alternative remedy where a defendant simply removes the infringing expression. The University of Miami Law Review commented that there was a lack of legislation on new technology, forcing judges to establish the law as it applies to video games. Activision president Jim Levy agreed that both legislative and judicial attention was needed over what constitutes a knock-off, comparing the growing video game industry to his experience in the more mature recording industry. Entertainment lawyers noted that challenging derivative games could also discourage smaller companies from making games that might be similar, particularly if they cannot afford the potential legal fees.

== Legacy ==
Atari v Philips found that K.C. Munchkin had likely infringed the copyright of Pac-Man, establishing that expressive content in video games does qualify for copyright protection, while excluding generic elements as free from protection. In the late 1980s, the Emory Law Journal cited the Atari v Philips as evidence that "only a moderate degree of similarity need be required to support a claim of infringement". However, the case was also cited in decisions that found no copyright infringement between games, despite noticeable similarities, such as Data East USA, Inc. v. Epyx, Inc. in 1988. By 1993, Hastings Communication and Entertainment Law Journal noted these different rulings about the "look and feel" of software, leading to conflicting advice from the Copyright Office.

In the 1999 book Legal Battles That Shaped the Computer Industry, Lawrence Graham writes that Atari v. Philips "helped to establish that copyright law does not protect video games as such, but does protect the particular expressive content in video games." He explains that later cases further developed the boundary between an unprotectable idea and a protectable expression, such as Data East v Epyx in 1988. In his book 2001 book Copyrights and Copywrongs, Siva Vaidhyanathan suggests that the ruling had a chilling effect on competition for Pac-Man, despite the court stating that copyright did not control the idea of a maze-chase game.

In 2012, Wired compared Atari v. Philips to a similar ruling of infringement in Tetris Holding, LLC v. Xio Interactive, Inc., as well as a 1994 ruling of non-infringement in Capcom U.S.A. Inc. v. Data East Corp. The conflicting rulings illustrate the challenges of the idea-expression distinction, that distinguishing between an idea and its expression may be "simple to state" but "difficult to apply". Screen Rant writes that the case "set a major precedent for copyright cases within video games as a whole", while 1up.com highlighted the case for its importance in video game law, noting that the high quality of the game had no impact on the legal question of copyright infringement.
