= Air-Sea War – Battle =

1978 video game

Air-Sea War - Battle
- Publishers: Philips; Magnavox
- Platform: Magnavox Odyssey²
- Release: 1978
- Genre: Compilation
- Mode: Multiplayer

Air-Sea War and Battle are two games that were released together as the fourth cartridge in the official Philips line of games for the Videopac. In North America, the same game was released as Armored Encounter! / Subchase! for the Magnavox Odyssey².

== Air-Sea War ==
This was one of the more premium releases, along with Wall Street Fortune and Quest for the Rings, that was released with a Board, pawns, and a video cartridge in a video/board hybrid release. The board was not offered in the United States.

Air-Sea War is a two-player game with player one controlling an aeroplane which is constantly moving from the right to the left of the screen while trying to drop bombs onto a boat controlled by player two, which is moving from left to right, and trying to fire missiles up at the plane. Both the bombs and missiles can be controlled after firing. There are also two neutral craft in the water. A point is added for each hit on the enemy, and one is deducted for each hit on a neutral craft, although scores can never be in the negatives. The player with the most points at the end of three minutes is the winner.

Similar to Risk, a copyrighted board game, there was a board in the premium packaging which allowed tracking and movement as lands were conquered; countries were 'occupied', and conflicts 'settled' with the video screen battle of tank to tank, tank to sea, tank to air, air to tank, air to sea, or air to air.

== Battle ==
Battle with complex maze and mines

Battle is also a two-player game, where each player controls a tank around walls and mines, with the aim being to fire the most shots on opponent's tank in three minutes while using a supply of 20 rounds. A point is deducted for hitting a mine, but scores never drop below zero. Multiple modes could be chosen with differing layouts of walls, the option of having mines or not and the option of being able to guide projectiles or not. The game is inspired by Atari's Combat.

== See also ==
- List of Videopac games
