= Smithereens =

Smithereens may refer to:

== Music ==
- The Smithereens, a rock band from New Jersey
- Smithereens (album), a 2022 album by Joji
- Smithereens, a 1998 album by Nick Harper, or its title track
- Smithereens, a 2005 album by Elin Sigvardsson
- "Smithereens", a 2018 song by Twenty One Pilots from the album Trench\

== Other uses ==
- Smithereens (book) a 2004 book by Shaun Micallef
- Smithereens (film), a 1982 film by Susan Seidelman
- "Smithereens" (Black Mirror), a 2019 television episode
- Smithereens!, a 1982 game for the Magnavox Odyssey² console
- Smithereens, a nickname of Horace Smith-Dorrien (1858–1930), British Army general
- Smithereens, natives of Smithers, British Columbia, a town in Canada
