= Stone Sling =

1981 video game

- Developer: Philips N.V.
- Publishers: PAL: Philips N.V.; NA: North American Philips
- Programmer: NA: Robert Cheezem
- Platforms: Odyssey²/Videopac; Philips Videopac+
- Release: Odyssey²: EU: 1981; NA: November 1982; Videopac+: PAL: 1983
- Genre: Artillery
- Mode: Multiplayer

Videopac 20 - Stone Sling is 1981 artillery video game released in Europe by Philips N.V. for the Philips Videopac G7000, also known as the Magnavox Odyssey². In North America it was reworked by Robert Cheezem and published under the title Smithereens! in 1982. In the game, two players face off with catapults and attempt to knock each other's tower down. In North America, the game featured compatibility with "The Voice of Odyssey²" expansion module. It was also later released for the Philips Videopac+ G7400.

It is heavily criticized for its simple and solely timing based gameplay. Some consider it a decent game for young kids. The game's realistic sound effects with the addition of the Voice module are often complimented.

== Gameplay ==
Two players take control of soldiers on either side of the screen, each with a catapult and a tower. Each player at any point can fire their catapult at the opposing tower in an attempt to knock it down. Holding any direction on the joystick charges up a shot and releasing fires the catapult's projectile with increasing distance depending on how long the joystick was held. If a player hit's their opponents catapult, it gets destroyed briefly while the opposing player grabs another one. A player loses when their tower is completely destroyed after nine hits.

There are three difficulty modes which control the level of tension in the catapults, meaning projectiles take less time to fly farther on later difficulties. Later versions for the Videopac+ include enhanced graphics and a colorful background.

A projectile from the blue player about to directly hit the red player. The game's graphics are naturally off center.

This game supports "The Voice" expansion module. With the module, there are explosion sound effects, and a voice which commentates the game, taunting or praising players depending on how well they aimed their boulder (using phrases like "Come on turkey, hit it!"). It also makes a gurgling noise if a stone lands in the water.

== Development & release ==
Stone Sling was first released in Europe by late 1981 along with other European along with other Videopac games Laser War and Catch The Ball / Noughts and Crosses. Also at the end of 1981, a new team of developers were hired at North American Philips Consumer Electronics in Knoxville, Tennessee. Among this new crew hired was Robert Cheezem, who was tasked with converting the game for the North American market. Cheezem hit a road block at one point caused by the game's code not finishing by the time the next frame was to be drawn.

== Reception ==
Bill Kunkel and Arnie Katz of Electronic Games wrote "Smithereens won't turn the videogaming world upside down, but it is a well-produced action contest that should capture the fancy of many teenagers and pre-teeners - and hold it through hours of play." While Arcade Express thought the game was better for young kids, they thought the "clever artwork" and "enhanced soundtrack" made it enjoyable even for adults. Earl Green in Classic Gamer Magazine wrote that he loved to drag Smithereens out for guests. He called it "the all-time best party game for the Odyssey²." Micheal Blanchet in his syndicated newspaper column Win at Video enjoyed the realistic sound effects provided by the voice writing, "Odyssey might be wise to incororate more of these authentic sound effects in future games and forget about bombarding the player with a monotonous litany of trite comments."

Both Alan R. Bechtold and Mike Wilson of The Logical Gamer thought the game was too simple and trivial with a bit of practice. Bechtold wrote "it's hard to miss the castle when you know how long to hold the joystick." The Video Game Update did not find it appealing and thought "only the crashing sounds made by a boulder hitting a castle wall were really good." In Videogaming Illustrated, Jim Clark said "This is a great game for five-to-eight year olds, and adults will have a lot of laughs playing with young kids - but there isn't much here for the serious video gamer." Clark's co-reviewer, E.C. Meade thought it was "one of the slowest 'action' games [he'd] ever played" and criticized how easy it was to make shots even without looking at the screen. Both critics thought the sound effects were a highlight, Meade saying it was "almost worth the price of admission."
