= Race – Spin-out – Cryptogram =

1978 line of video games

Race - Spin-out - Cryptogram (Europe) Speedway / Spin-out / Cryptologic (US)
- Publishers: Philips; Magnavox
- Platform: Magnavox Odyssey²
- Release: NA: September 1978; PAL: December 1978
- Genre: Various

Cartridge number 1 in the official Philips line of games for the Philips Videopac contains three games: Race, Spin-out, and Cryptogram. In the United States, it was distributed as the launch title for the Magnavox Odyssey² as Speedway / Spin-out / Cryptologic.

== Gameplay ==
=== Race ===
Race is a fairly simple game where the player controls a car travelling on an infinite straight stretch of road. The player starts from a standstill, and can move the stick up to accelerate, down to decelerate, or right and left move the car sideways. Players attempt to drive as far as they can within two minutes, receiving a time penalty every time they crash into another car. If you ever slow to a stop then your car gets run over.

=== Spin-out ===
Spin-out is a two-player game, in which each player controls a car around a loop of racetrack. The winner is the one who completes three or fifteen laps the fastest, there are time penalties for crashing into a wall or spinning when hit by the other car. This game comes with four variations.

=== Cryptogram ===
Cryptogram is also for two players, one types in a message of up to fourteen characters, then hits enter to scramble it. The other player types in what they think it is, and loses points for each incorrect letter, in a similar fashion to hangman.

== Reception ==
The cartridge was reviewed by Video magazine in its "Arcade Alley" column where it was praised as "a good showcase for the [Odyssey²]'s capabilities" whose varied gameplay is "well calculated to whet the arcade addict's appetite for more". The three constituent games were reviewed individually as well with Speedway receiving faint criticism for its overly easy slow speed setting, Spin-Out being described as "best with two players", and Crypto-logic praised as "an easy way for parents to help their school-age children with spelling." Craig Kubey called it "certainly the most diverse" launch title for any of the then available systems.
