= Ed Averett =

American video game designer

- Born: 1948 (age 77–78)
- Education: University of Tennessee
- Occupations: Video game designer and programmer
- Employer: Intel
- Known for: Game designer for the Magnavox Odyssey²
- Notable work: K.C. Munchkin!; K.C.'s Krazy Chase; Pick Axe Pete!; Quest for the Rings; Attack of the Timelord!
- Spouse: Linda Averett

Edward B. Averett (born 1948) is an American video game designer, programmer, and electrical engineer from Chattanooga, Tennessee. A former employee of Intel, he developed 25 games for the Magnavox Odyssey² as a freelance developer from 1979 to 1982, more than half of the system's library in North America. He designed and programmed K.C. Munchkin, which was the subject of a landmark court case in video game copyright law. He is also the current owner of the K.C. Munchkin character.

== Biography ==
=== Early life ===
Averett was born in 1948. In 1970, he earned a Bachelors of Science in electrical engineering from the University of Tennessee, Knoxville. He received a Master's degree in electrical engineering from the same university a year later. There he also met his wife, Linda, who went on to work as an operating systems developer for Hewlett-Packard and is now a corporate vice president at Microsoft. The two of them met in a sophomore calculus class and got engaged outside of their college residence hall. Averett joined to army for two years before being employed by Intel.

=== Career ===
By 1977, Averett was a sales representative at Intel, assisting in the development of the Intel 8244 graphics chip that was planned for use in the upcoming Magnavox Odyssey². Following a case of writer's block from the game development team at Magnavox, he offered to develop games for the system to keep the Odyssey² project from shutting down. According to Averett, he believed he could make more money for Intel selling games rather than selling the chips themselves. In April 1977, He quit his job at Intel and offered to be paid for new Odyssey² games in royalties as a freelance developer. At January CES 1978, Averett approached the head of Magnavox's games division, Mike Staup, and formally entered into a game development partnership. Ed, with assistance from his wife Linda, designed and programmed almost all of the games developed for the Odyssey² between 1979 and 1982, 25 in total.

Following the success of Pac-Man, Magnavox commissioned Averett to produce a similar game for the Odyssey². He created K.C. Munchkin, a similar feeling maze game released in 1981. K.C. Munchkin sold more copies in its first two months than all of the previous Odyssey² games combined. This success prompted Philips, Magnavox's parent company, to investment more money into their video game projects. In collaboration with Steve Lehner and Rob Bradford, Averett also created the Master Strategy series, starting with Quest for the Rings in 1981, three video game/board game hybrids released for the Odyssey² which were considered highly innovative by contemporary critics.

=== Atari lawsuit ===
In 1982, Atari Inc., who had licensed the home console rights to Pac-Man from Namco, sued Philips over K.C. Munchkin citing copyright infringement. In the ensuing court case, Averett testified to only having played Pac-Man a couple times before starting on development. Philips won the initial motion but lost on appeal, setting a landmark ruling in video game copyright law. K.C. Munchkin was ultimately pulled from store shelves.

In response to the ruling, Averett developed a K.C. Munchkin sequel titled K.C.'s Krazy Chase released in 1982. He later stated he created the game because "K.C. was my character and I wanted it on record that it was not Pac-Man."

=== Retirement ===
Averett left the video game industry in early 1983. In later interviews, he said he decided to leave due to early warning signs of the 1983 video game crash and a desire to spend more time with his kids (aged four and six at the time). One of the last games Averett developed for the Odyssey² was Attack of the Timelord. Following the crash, he went on to write educational software for aquariums, schools, and other facilities.

By 2017, Averett had created a follow-up game featuring K.C. Munchkin titled K.C. Returns! released for Windows 8 platforms. As of 2025, the games webpage is defunct and the app is no longer available through the Microsoft Store.

== Design process ==
Averett claims that most of the games he designed were pitched to him by Magnavox vice president Mike Staup. Often he was simply given a demographic to hit, such as "boys" or "moms", and would flesh out a design from there. Averett coded all of his games in assembly and programmed all of the graphics in binary by hand. The smaller games on 2 KB cartridges took about two months of development and the larger 4 KB games took about four months. It took an additional two to six months for games to arrive on store shelves. Each game shared about 60% of its code base from one game to the next.

Programming work was also shared with Ed's wife Linda. During development he would hit certain technical problems and ask Linda to give them a shot. According to Linda, she programmed player and enemy movement logic. She said, "It was fun, and it gave me my first real exposure to consumers using computerlike products." According to Ed, "I'd then say it needed to be tweaked and that it would be more fun to do it a certain way and she'd be ready to kill me." Eventually, Ed says he did most of the programming on his own.

== Selected works ==
Year	Game title	Collaborators
1979	Alpine Skiing!	
1979	Hockey! / Soccer!	
1979	Invaders from Hyperspace!	
1979	I've Got Your Number!	
1979	Showdown in 2100 A.D.	
1979	Take the Money and Run!	w/ Linda Everett
1979	War of Nerves!	
1980	Alien Invaders - Plus!	w/ Linda Everett
1980	Blockout! / Breakdown!	
1980	Casino Slot Machine!	
1980	Electronic Table Soccer!	
1980	Pachinko!	
1980	Pocket Billiards!	
1980	Volleyball!	
1981	K.C. Munchkin!	
1981	Monkeyshines!	
1981	Quest for the Rings	w/ Steve Lehner
1981	UFO!	w/ Linda Everett
1982	Attack of the Timelord!	w/ Linda Everett
1982	Conquest of the World	w/ Steve Lehner
1982	Freedom Fighters!	
1982	The Great Wall Street Fortune Hunt	w/ Steve Lehner
1982	K.C.'s Krazy Chase	
1982	Pick Axe Pete!	
