= Bill Kunkel (journalist) =

Video game journalist (1950–2011)

- Born: July 21, 1950; United States
- Died: September 4, 2011 (aged 61); United States
- Other names: The Game Doctor; Potshot
- Occupations: Editor, writer
- Spouse: Charlene Kunkel

Bill Kunkel (July 21, 1950 – September 4, 2011) was a graphic novelist as well as pioneering professional wrestling and video game journalist and critic from the 1970s until his death in the early 2010s. During his time working with the video game industry, Kunkel authored numerous strategy guides, co-designed several video games, served as an expert witness in three court cases, and taught courses in Game Design for the University of Nevada, Las Vegas (UNLV). Kunkel served as the executive editor of Electronic Games Magazine and the editor-in-chief of Tips & Tricks magazine, writing columns and comics for several magazines and game sites. He often wrote under nicknames, the most common of which were "The Game Doctor" (for video game topics), and "Potshot" (for professional wrestling topics).

== Graphic novels and zines ==
Coming from a professional music background in the 1960s, Kunkel met and became friends with fan newsletter/fanzine writers Arnie Katz and Joyce Worley in 1971 in New York City. Katz and Worley hosted monthly science fiction fanzine parties at their apartment and these were attended by several notable figures in the fanzine and comic scenes. At one of these parties, Kunkel met Denny O'Neil and their friendship led to Kunkel writing comics for DC, Marvel, and Harvey. Kunkel wrote several comic book stories which were published by DC Comics in 1977–1978 including Action Comics, "Madame Xanadu" in Doorway to Nightmare, and "Vigilante" in World's Finest Comics. At Marvel Comics, he wrote two issues of Marvel Team-Up in 1978–1979. By the late 1970s, Kunkel's freelancing efforts for Harvey had led to his becoming the primary scripter for the Richie Rich comics.

== Professional wrestling journalism ==
Alongside his work with comics, Kunkel also worked during the 1970s in the niche field of professional wrestling journalism and became known as a ground-breaking wrestling journalist. Working in collaboration with Arnie Katz, Joyce Worley, and his wife Charlene, Kunkel edited, published, and served as photographer for Main Event magazine and hosted weekly broadcasts of The Main Event Radio Show from New York. Main Event was mimeographed in the apartment of Katz and Worley, and sold through WWWF concession stands at prominent East Coast venues including Madison Square Garden and The Philly Spectrum. Kunkel soon became a "must-read" columnist and played a key part during the early days of Pro Wrestling Torch in turning the small newsletter into a wrestling newsletter powerhouse. Adopting the moniker, "Potshot", Kunkel later moved to Wrestling Perspective as a featured columnist and cartoonist. Along with the Phantom of the Ring, Kunkel's work for Wrestling Perspective attracted respect and prestige to the publication.

During the late 1980s, Kunkel co-designed the first professional WWF-based wrestling video game, MicroLeague Wrestling (C64, Subway Software), and in 1989 he co-hosted a local Las Vegas professional wrestling radio show with Ric "Hotline" Carter.

== Video game journalism ==
Discovering common interests in the then-nascent video game industry, Kunkel, Katz and Worley approached Video editor, Bruce Apar in 1978 about writing a video game column for his magazine. Apar agreed and "Arcade Alley" was launched that Spring, with Katz writing under the pseudonym "Frank T. Laney II".

Although Video publisher, Jay Rosenfield (of Reese Publishing Co.) had initial concerns over whether there was sufficient reader interest to justify Arcade Alley, the column proved to be of significant interest to readers. Working in direct consultation with game designers, Kunkel, Katz (who began writing under his real name starting in April 1982), and Worley popularized the new "sport" of "electronic gamesmanship", and by 1981 they had secured the blessing of Rosenfield to launch a new magazine under Reese Publishing that would be entirely dedicated to video games. The first issue of Electronic Games, and first dedicated video game magazine published in the United States, was released in October 1981.

Bill Kunkel was the executive editor of Electronic Games Magazine in the early 1980s. Kunkel was also editor-in-chief of Tips & Tricks magazine from January 2007 until August 2007 when it ceased publication. Following staff cuts at Reese Publications in 1984–1985, Kunkel left Reese to join his two lifelong friends, Arnie Katz and Joyce Worley (who had both been laid off) and formed Katz Kunkel Worley, Inc. (KKW) to focus on journalistic content, and Subway Software to focus on game design. Kunkel's nickname, "The Game Doctor", was based on a column he wrote for several magazines (including both versions of Electronic Games, VG&CE, EGM, and CGW) and game sites (including HappyPuppy.com, PostalNation.net and J2Games.com).

Kunkel remained active in the industry until his death, having served as editor-in-chief of Tips & Tricks during its final year of publication (2007). He continued to be active as a member of Running With Scissors and EIC of Postal Nation (PostalNation.net) and wrote regularly for J2Games.com. He received a Lifetime Achievement Award from the Classic Gaming Expo in 1999 along with the other co-founders of the original Electronic Games magazine, Arnie Katz and Joyce Worley-Katz. The trio revived the Electronic Games title for several years in the early 1990s for Sendai/Decker.

Dubbed "The Grandfather of video game journalism", Kunkel wrote numerous retrospective "memoir pieces" for DigitPress as an irregular series entitled "The Kunkel Report" (a reference to one of Kunkel's columns by the same name in Electronic Games), and for GoodDealGames.com. In articles like these Kunkel detailed his role in the video game industry from its earliest years, discussed his decision to testify on behalf of smaller video game companies in lawsuits against larger corporations, and described the difficult task of maintaining journalistic integrity and critical neutrality in the face of lucrative investment opportunities such as the offer by Steve Case to invest in AOL precursor Quantum Link that Kunkel (who was reviewing software for the Commodore 64) was forced to turn down in order to maintain credibility as a journalist. These retrospective articles were subsequently collected and published in 2005 as a memoir under the title Confessions of The Game Doctor. The Society of Professional Journalists honored Kunkel's role in the industry by naming their video game journalism awards the Kunkel Awards.

=== Video game design ===
In the mid-1980s, subsequent to their departure from Reese Publications, Kunkel formed Subway Software with Arnie Katz and Joyce Worley and provided design for over 15 video games.

- Borrowed Time (1985)
- MicroLeague Wrestling (1987)
- The Three Stooges (1987) - Kunkel credited separately for Game Manual and Documentation
- Ringling Bros. Circus Games (1988)
- Star Trek: First Contact (1988)
- 1st Person Pinball (1989)
- Buffalo Bill's Wild West Show (1989)
- Mayday Squad (1989)
- MicroLeague Baseball II (1989)
- Roller Coaster Rumbler (1989)
- Superman: The Man of Steel (1989)
- Beverly Hills Cop (1990)
- Omnicron Conspiracy (1990)
- Orb-3D (1990)
- Bart's Nightmare (1992)
- Batman Returns (1992) - Kunkel credited separately for Game Design
- Blood Bowl (1995) - Kunkel given Special Thanks
- Postal (1997) - Kunkel credited separately for Story and Cutscene Text
- Earth & Beyond (2002) - Kunkel credited separately as a Writer

=== Expert witness ===
Kunkel's credentials as an expert in the field of video games was recognized in three US court cases from the early 1980s to the mid-1990s, where Kunkel served as an expert witness in three seminal video game copyright cases:

- Atari, Inc. v. North American Philips Consumer Electronics Corp. - Kunkel testified that Philips' K.C. Munchkin was a significantly different game from Atari's Pac-Man—evidence suggesting that a copyright violation by Philips had not occurred.
- Lewis Galoob Toys, Inc. v. Nintendo of America, Inc. - Kunkel provided dollar estimates for the amount of damage Nintendo had done to Galoob in enjoining the release of the Game Genie cheat cartridge until after the 1990 Christmas shopping season.
- Capcom U.S.A., Inc. v. Data East Corp. - Kunkel testified that Data East's Fighter's History was significantly different from Capcom's Street Fighter II—evidence suggesting that a copyright violation by Data East had not occurred.
