= Video (magazine) =

American consumer electronics magazine

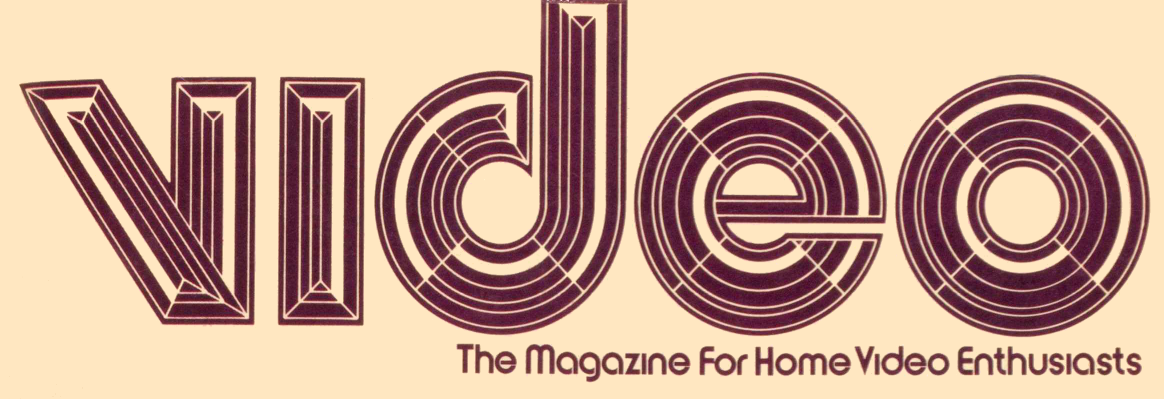
- Frequency: 1977-1979: Quarterly; 1980-1999: Monthly
- Format: 28 cm
- Publisher: Reese Publishing Company, Inc.
- First issue: November 1977
- Final issue: 1999
- Company: Reese Publishing Company, Inc.
- Country: North America
- Based in: 235 Park Avenue South, New York, N.Y. 10003
- Language: English language
- ISSN: 0147-8907
- OCLC: 3428421

Video is a discontinued American consumer electronics magazine that was published from 1977 to 1999 by Reese Communications with a focus on video and audio devices. The magazine showcases new audiovisual products, analyzes current practices and trends in the field, and provides critical reviews of newly marketed products and equipment. During its early years, it competed fiercely with contemporary journals like Video Review and Video Buyer's Review—ultimately culminating in a 1980 trademark infringement suit over use of the term "Video Buyer's Guide". In March 1995, Video was acquired from Reese by Hachette Filipacchi, and in 1999 it was merged with their bi-monthly Sound & Image magazine to become Sound & Vision.

Today, the legacy of Video lies in the history of video game journalism as its regular column, "Arcade Alley", represents the earliest example of a video game column in a mainstream publication. Arcade Alley is credited with having popularized the nascent medium, leading its two main writers to create the first US video game magazine, Electronic Games.

== History ==
Video was founded in 1977 by Reese Communications publisher Jay Rosenfield with a small team including editors Rena Adler and Deeny Kaplan, marketing director Thomas Koger, circulation director Max H. Wolff, and contributors including Kenneth Lorber, Dee Shannon, Wayne Hyde, and Ivan Berger and Lancelot Braithwaite. The magazine's first issue was published in November 1977 with subsequent issues appearing quarterly for the first three years until 1980 when it became a monthly publication. The last issue of each year was a special edition titled "Video Buyer's Guide" which was intended to serve as a guide to products that consumers would be using during the upcoming year, thus the special Buyer's Guide published at the end of 1977 was titled "1978 Video Buyer's Guide". The buyer's guide proved popular among readers, selling 18,440 copies in 1977 and 25,635 copies in 1978.

Competition sprang up rapidly and Video soon shared the consumer video magazine market with publications like Richard Ekstract's Video Review, Hampton International Communications's Video Buyer's Review, and United Business Publications's Home Video. (Note: United Business Publications also published an affiliated trade magazine titled Videography.) Richard Ekstract was widely regarded as an imitator by Video staffers including Arnie Katz who claimed that Ekstract's later-published Electronic Fun was attempting to imitate Katz's Electronic Games.

By early 1979, however, marketing successes at Video prompted the hiring of several new staffers including public relations director Bruce Apar and national advertising director David Berns (assuming responsibility for this area from Rosenfield who had served as Video's first advertising director). Berns's termination from this position only six months after he had been hired and his subsequent employment by competitor Hampton soon led to Hampton's publication of a competing buyer's guide also titled "Video Buyer's Guide"—an act that provoked Reese to file an unsuccessful lawsuit against Hampton for damage to their trademark.

In 1980, Bruce Apar became editor-in-chief and co-publisher alongside Rosenfield, and a number of structural and distribution changes took place for the magazine. Briefly anticipating a switch from quarterly to bi-monthly at the end of 1979, Video decided instead to publish on a monthly schedule. A number of semi-regular features were made into departments and Video added a new set of regular columns penned by contributors including Ken Winslow, Arnie Katz, Bill Smolen, Susan March, Susan Prentiss, Rod Woodcock, and Bill Kunkel among others. The publication of Katz and Kunkel's "Arcade Alley" as a regular Video column in 1980 has since become widely recognized as the first regular occurrence of consumer-oriented video game journalism.

In 1982, additional changes were made to content structure with the addition of a Program Guide, and the magazine's format and layout were set with minimal changes for the next decade. In March 1995, Video was acquired from Reese by Hachette Filipacchi, and in 1999 it was merged with their Stereo Review magazine to become Sound & Vision.

=== Reese Publishing Company v. Hampton International Communications ===
The August 1979 legal filing by Reese Publishing Company against Hampton International Communications came at a time when competition between Video and rival publications Video Review, Video Buyer's Review, and Home Video over the emerging home video market had reached a flash point. It was precipitated directly by Hampton's hiring of Video's recently terminated advertising director, David Berns, and the subsequent announcement of its intention to publish a buyer's guide titled "1980 Official Video Buyer's Guide". In its filing, Reese alleged injury to its "Video Buyer's Guide" trademark and requested preliminary injunctive and monetary relief in anticipation of Hampton's publication of this similarly titled guide. On September 10, 1979, in a ruling for the U.S. District Court for the Eastern District of New York, Judge George C. Pratt delivered a memorandum opinion holding "Video Buyer's Guide" to be a generic trademark, denying Reese's motion for injunctive relief, and dismissing the complaint against Hampton. Vindicated, Hampton released its buyer's guide shortly afterward under the title "Hampton's Official 1980 Video Buyer's Guide".

Appealing the decision before the U.S. Court of Appeals for the Second Circuit in early 1980, Reese asserted that the lower court had abused its discretion in finding the trademark to be generic, that it had failed to provide Reese an adequate opportunity to present all evidence, that state claims were not adjudicated, and that other bases for enjoining Hampton's use of the mark had been ignored. The three-judge panel considered the mark's position relative to the spectrum of distinctiveness recently expounded in the 1976 decision of Abercrombie & Fitch Co. v. Hunting World, Inc., and noted particularly the similarities between Reese's claims and those of CES (who in 1975 had sought unsuccessfully to protect their trademark for the term "Consumer Electronics") in CES Publishing Corp. v. St. Regis Publications, Inc. In a published opinion, Judge Wilfred Feinberg affirmed the lower court decision and dismissed the case.

== Content ==
Launching in November 1977 and concluding in 1999, Video covered consumer electronics with a specific focus on the emerging home video market. The magazine showcased new audiovisual products (e.g. TVs, VHS, and Laserdisc players), analyzed contemporary practices and trends in the field, and critically reviewed newly marketed products and equipment. From 1977 to 1979 the magazine was published quarterly with an annual buyer's guide for the coming year published at the end of each year. Features were run irregularly to semi-regularly with "New Products", "Reader Feedback", and the "VideoTest Report" series (with tests conducted by technical editors Ivan Berger and Lancelot Braithwaite) proving to be the most regular. Other repeated features during Video's early years include "The Video Environment" written by Dee Shannon, "Video Workshop" written by Ken Lorber, and "Technical Q&A" written by Wayne Hyde.

In 1980, Video became a monthly publication and the new editor-in-chief, Bruce Apar, oversaw a number of format and layout changes with semi-regular features like "New Products" and "Reader Feedback" becoming departments, "VideoTest Report" becoming its own division, and with the creation of a half-dozen regular columns including "Channel One" written by Apar, "Video Programmer" written by Ken Winslow, "TV Den" by Bill Smolen, "VideoGram" by Susan March, "Fine Tuning" by Susan Prentiss and Roderick Woodcock, and "Arcade Alley" by Bill Kunkel and Arnie Katz. In 1982, the magazine layout was again altered, creating a new "Program Guide" division from former departments "Video Programming Guide/Program Directory", "Programming News & Views", "Top 50 Bestselling Titles, Sales & Rentals" (later renamed "Top 15" and then "Top 10"), and the new "Program Reviews". For the next decade, features and columns would come and go, but the overall format and layout would remain largely the same.

=== Arcade Alley ===
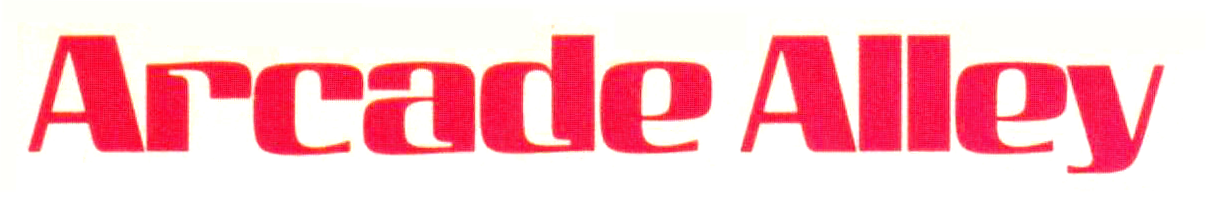
Best-known version of the logo of the "Arcade Alley" column

"Arcade Alley – A Critical Look at Video Cartridge Games & Programs" was a regular column in Video magazine, appearing quarterly in 1979 and monthly beginning in 1980, and ran until issue August 1984 (Volume VIII, Number 5). It was created by Bill Kunkel, Arnie Katz, and Joyce Worley, three New York-based friends with a common background in comics, professional wrestling, freelance journalism, and fanzine culture. Through professional connections, they became acquainted with Video's director of public relations, Bruce Apar, in the late 1970s and pitched to him the idea of a regular video game review column for Video which, under the oversight of editor Deeny Kaplan, had been publishing a series of articles called "VideoTest Reports" that sporadically covered video game topics and reviewed collections of games. Apar was enthusiastic about the idea and approached Reese's publisher, Jay Rosenfield. He initially expressed concerns over whether there was enough interest in the new "sport" of "electronic gamesmanship" to justify a regular column on the topic. Despite these concerns, Rosenfield green-lighted the column which was inaugurated under the ambivalent philosophy of "we have nothing to lose", and the column proved to be a success among readers.

Working in direct consultation with game designers, Kunkel, Katz, and Worley are credited with popularizing video games for commercial markets and normalizing the pastime of gaming in its earliest years. During their time writing "Arcade Alley", both Kunkel and Katz contributed other articles to Video as well. Kunkel wrote one-off features and pieces on the then-new ESPN cable channel and the interactive gaming programs of the QUBE cable channel, and Katz wrote "Televiews"—a television-specific column for Video. Katz additionally wrote for and served as associate editor for the trade journal, Chain Store Age, so for contractual reasons and to avoid tarnishing his name as a serious tech journalist, writing credits for Arcade Alley were given to Kunkel and Katz under the pseudonym Frank T. Laney II. (Note: The name Frank T. Laney II was chosen by Katz to honor Frank Towner Laney, an early science fiction fanzine editor and author of "Ah, Sweet Idiocy!" Katz would begin writing "Arcade Alley" under his real name starting in April 1982.) Aiming to review three games per column, Kunkel and Katz often found that their biggest difficulty was the size of the market which often failed to produce enough new titles to review and forced the reviewers to accept any and all games for review. In an interview with Gamasutra, Katz recalled that "we had to review every single game that Atari made because that was all there were". The depth of coverage given to the few titles available was notable for its time, and aspects interesting to the reader such as "easter eggs"—a term for hidden messages and inside jokes left by game programmers—were emphasized.

Bruce Apar became editor-in-chief in 1980 and "Arcade Alley" grew from a quarterly to a monthly column in parallel with the expansion of Video's publishing frequency. This year also marked the launch of the Arkie Awards—a yearly award naming a Game of the Year for both home console and PC platforms, and honoring video games from the previous year for excellence in categories such as Innovation, Gameplay (Competition, Solitaire-play, etc.), Audio-visual effects, and Genre (Science fiction, Sports, Adventure, etc.). Due to overwhelming reader support for the column, Kunkel, Katz, and Worley pitched the publication of the United States' first dedicated video game magazine to Jay Rosenfield and in October 1981 Electronic Games was launched. Electronic Games was tested as a one-off issue, but proved popular enough that it became a regular bi-monthly and then a monthly magazine. Despite this outlet, however, the three founders of Arcade Alley continued working for Video, jointly hosting the Arkie Awards between the two Reese publications. By 1982 Video was considered the "number one magazine in the industry", and Katz dropped his pseudonym to write under his real name.
