= Pick Axe Pete! =

1982 video game

- North American box art
- Developer: Ed Averett
- Publishers: NA: North American Philips; PAL: Philips N.V.
- Programmers: Ed Averett; Linda Averett
- Platforms: Odyssey²/Videopac; Philips Videopac+
- Release: Odyssey²: NA: July 1982; PAL: April 1983; Videopac+: PAL: 1983
- Genre: Platform
- Mode: Single-player

Pick Axe Pete!, known in Europe as Videopac 43 - Pickaxe Pete, is a 1982 platform video game released for the Magnavox Odyssey², also known as the Philips Videopac G7000. It was created by American programmer Ed Averett and his wife Linda and published by Philips. The player takes the role of the miner Pick Axe Pete who searching the Misty Mountain Mine for gold. A national high score competition was held at the 1982 World's Fair. In Brazil, it was titled Didi na Mina Encantada (Didi in the Enchanted Mine) based on the character Didi from the TV series Os Trapalhões.

It is consistently compared with the arcade hit Donkey Kong, though most critics consider the gameplay to have made enough changes for the title to stand on its own. It is considered one of the best games for the Odyssey², especially by retrospective reviewers. While the gameplay is frequently praised as compelling and addictive, the graphics are often criticized as underwhelming.

== Gameplay ==
The player controls a miner named Pick Axe Pete who is traversing the Misty Mountain Mine is search for gold. Pete starts in the middle of the screen with a pick-axe. Ladders occasionally appear and disappear which allow Pete to traverse the level's seven floors. There are three doors from which boulders emerge, bouncing down the mine-shafts. These doors also serve as exits for the boulders that pass by. Every time Pete destroys a boulder, he gains 3 points, although the axe wears out after a while and disappears. When two boulders collide, they explode, and out comes either a pick-axe which floats to the bottom of the screen, a key which floats to the top, or nothing.

Pickaxe Pete holding his pick-axe in front of a yellow, blue, and green door

If Pete has no axe, the player can either earn one point by jumping over boulders, or get to the bottom of the mine to retrieve a new axe and earn a five point bonus. Collecting a key allows Pete to open one of the three doors which leads him to one of the game's nine alternate levels, depending on the door's color. Grey doors lead Pete to a level with invisible floor. If Pete tries to enter a door without a key, he'll get stuck for a short period, after which he is ejected to one side.

== Release ==
Pick Axe Pete! was released in July 1982 in North America. In Europe, it was released in April 1983 as Pickaxe Pete, the 43rd Videopac cartridge. In Brazil, it was re-branded as Didi na Mina Encantada (Didi in the Enchanted Mine) for the Philips Odyssey, featuring the character Didi from the TV series Os Trapalhões on the game cover.

European box art

A U.S. national competition, "The Pick Axe Pete Pick-Off," was held at the 1982 World's Fair in Knoxville, Tennessee. The contest was held within the Odyssey display at the "America's Electric Energy" pavilion on October 9, 1982. The winner was ten year old Tony Scardigno from Weehawken, New Jersey who won a pound of gold.

== Reception ==
Bill Kunkel and Arnie Katz of Electronic Games thought Pick Axe Pete! combined "elements of several of today's hottest coin-ops while managing to be totally unique and absolutely captivating." They echoed this sentiment in their 1983 Software Encyclopedia while adding that the graphics were "a little sparse" but still "quite attractive and engaging." In a December 1982 review, US magazine Joystik called the game "Odyssey's new entry in the Donkey Kong lookalike contest". The reviewer gave it a 3/10 for graphics and 7/10 for gameplay and concluded:

We're not overly thrilled by the graphics of this game—there's just nothing spectacular about the way it looks. But we think most "level game" fans will enjoy Pick Axe Pete's challenging game play.

It was recommended by The Video Game Update which called it a "very good game." Eleven year old Rawson Stovall gave the game an "A" in originality and gameplay and a "B" in graphics giving the game a "B+" overall. Mike Wilson of The Logical Gamer thought the graphics couldn't compare to what was being done on the Atari 2600 but thought the gameplay was good. Wilson's co-reviewer Alan R. Bechtold said despite it being "derivative, Pick Axe Pete is a clever, fun game to play." He said he was very frustrated with the game initially but it grew on him over time.

British magazine Computer and Video Games was very critical of the game calling the graphics "uninspiring" and gameplay quick to become "unchallenging." German magazine TeleMatch thought it was easily recognized as a variant of Donkey Kong but that it also brought new elements into play. They considered it an excellent action game that remained engaging over long periods.

Brett Weiss writing in 2011 called it "one of the best, most arcade-like games for the Odyssey²." He thought it was similar to Donkey Kong but considered there to be "many more differences than similarities." Videogames Hardware Handbook written by the Retrogamer staff considered the game to be at least as difficult as Donkey Kong if not more. In 2000, Classic Gamer Magazine called it "the best game ever created for the Odyssey²." In 2007, Wanderer from Hardcore Gamer found most of the games made for the Odyssey² to be "bad ripoffs of popular Atari 2600 games" but thought Pick Axe Pete! was one of their occasional moments of inspiration. The author said they played the game for the entirety of 1983.
