= Philips Videopac+ G7400 =

Third-generation home video game console

Videopac+ G7400

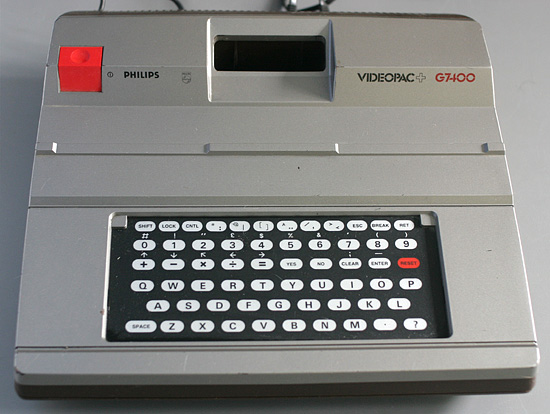
- Philips Videopac+ G7400 console
- Manufacturer: Philips
- Type: Home video game console
- Generation: Third
- Released: 1983; 43 years ago
- CPU: Intel 8048 @ 5.91MHz
- Memory: 6 KB RAM, 1 KB ROM
- Display: RF modulator, composite, RGB; 320×238 resolution
- Graphics: Intel 8245, EF9340 (VIN), EF9341 (GEN)
- Sound: 1 channel, 8 sounds
- Predecessor: Philips Videopac G7000
- Successor: Philips CD-i; Philips MSX

The Philips Videopac+ G7400 is a third-generation home video game console released only in Europe in limited quantities in 1983. An American release as the Odyssey³ Command Center was planned for the Odyssey series but never occurred. The G7400 was the successor to the Philips Videopac G7000, the European counterpart to the American Magnavox Odyssey². The system featured excellently tailored background and foreground graphics. A licensed clone called the Thomson-Brandt J0 7400 or Jopac was also released in France.

The G7400 could play three types of games: all normal G7000 games, special G7000 games with additional high-res background graphics that would appear only when played on the G7400, and G7400-only games with high-res sprites and backgrounds.

== Odyssey³ ==
The Videopac+ G7400 was initially announced as the Odyssey 3 in North America (stylized as Odyssey³), planned for release in mid 1983. Representatives were initially unsure whether the system would be positioned as a video game console or a home computer. It was showcased at Winter CES 1983, where it was called the Odyssey Command Center. The console was announced as fully compatible with all previous Odyssey² titles with included peripheral ports for Voice compatibility. N.A.P. showcased updated version of games such as Pick Axe Pete! and Freedom Fighters! with more graphically rich backgrounds. The system was set for a release in July 1983 at a suggested retail price of $199. A peripheral that expanded the system into a home computer platform with 16 KB of RAM was planned for a Christmas launch.

At Summer CES in June 1983, N.A.P. announced that the North American release of the Odyssey 3 would be delayed to early 1984. Mike Staup said "We are convinced that the computer capability must be built in to the unit rather than as an outboarded capability as announced in December." According to N.A.P. spokesman Jerry Michaelson, they choose not to release the console in the United States because they were "leapfrogging to the next [generation]." Odyssey discontinued operations in March 1984. the Odyssey 3 was never released in North America.

== Specifications ==
- CPU: Intel 8048, 5.91 MHz
- RAM: 6 KB + 192 Byte
- ROM: 1 KB
- Display: 320×238×16 (Intel 8245 for G7000 compatible 128x64 16 color graphics and Thomson EF9340 [VIN] and EF9341 [GEN] )
- Audio: 1 channel, 8 sounds
- Input / Output: RF modulator, Péritel/SCART connector (with RGB), joystick port(s), ROM cartridge port
- Expansion
  - The Voice – Speech synthesis unit, compatible with G7000
  - Chess Module – Increased the G7400's computing power such that it could play chess, also compatible with G7000
  - Microsoft BASIC Home Computer Module (C7420) – Similar to above, with the purpose of converting the G7400 into a "real" computer, not compatible with G7000. An additional Z80 CPU with 16 KB RAM and 16 KB ROM.

== Legacy ==
The Videopac Collection Volume 1 was released on Steam on November 24, 2022. It uses O2EM for emulation and includes the G7400 versions of the games when applicable.
