= Tilt (French magazine) =

French video game magazine

- Issue 1, September 1982
- Editor: Jean-Michel Blottière
- Categories: Video game magazines
- Frequency: Monthly
- First issue: September 1982
- Final issue Number: January 1994; 122
- Company: Editions Mondiales S.A.
- Country: France
- Based in: Paris
- Language: French
- ISSN: 0753-6968

Tilt was a French magazine which began publication in September 1982, focused on computer and console gaming. It was the first French magazine specifically devoted to video games. The headquarters of the magazine was in Paris.

The name of the magazine was a nod to the pinball term, where excessive nudging of a pinball machine would result in a "tilt" penalty, and the loss of a turn during gameplay. The final issue of Tilt was published January 1994. In 2013, French video game developer and publisher Anuman acquired Tilt.
