= Electronic Fun with Computers & Games =

American video game magazine

- Editor-in-Chief: Richard Ekstract
- Categories: Video game journalism
- Frequency: Monthly
- Publisher: Richard Ekstract
- First issue: November 1982
- Final issue: May 1984
- Company: Fun & Games Publishing
- Country: USA
- Based in: 350 East 81st Street, New York, NY 10028
- Language: English
- ISSN: 0746-0546
- OCLC: 10488752

Electronic Fun with Computers & Games was a video game magazine published in the United States from November 1982 to May 1984. For the last two issues it was renamed ComputerFun.

== Content ==
The magazine contained the following sections:

- Special Features
- Regular Features
- Equipment Reviews
- Game Reviews
- Departments

== Legacy ==
The cover art for the November 1983 issue was used as the album art for the 1984 album Night Lines by Dave Grusin.
