= Magnavox Odyssey 2 =

Second generation home video game console

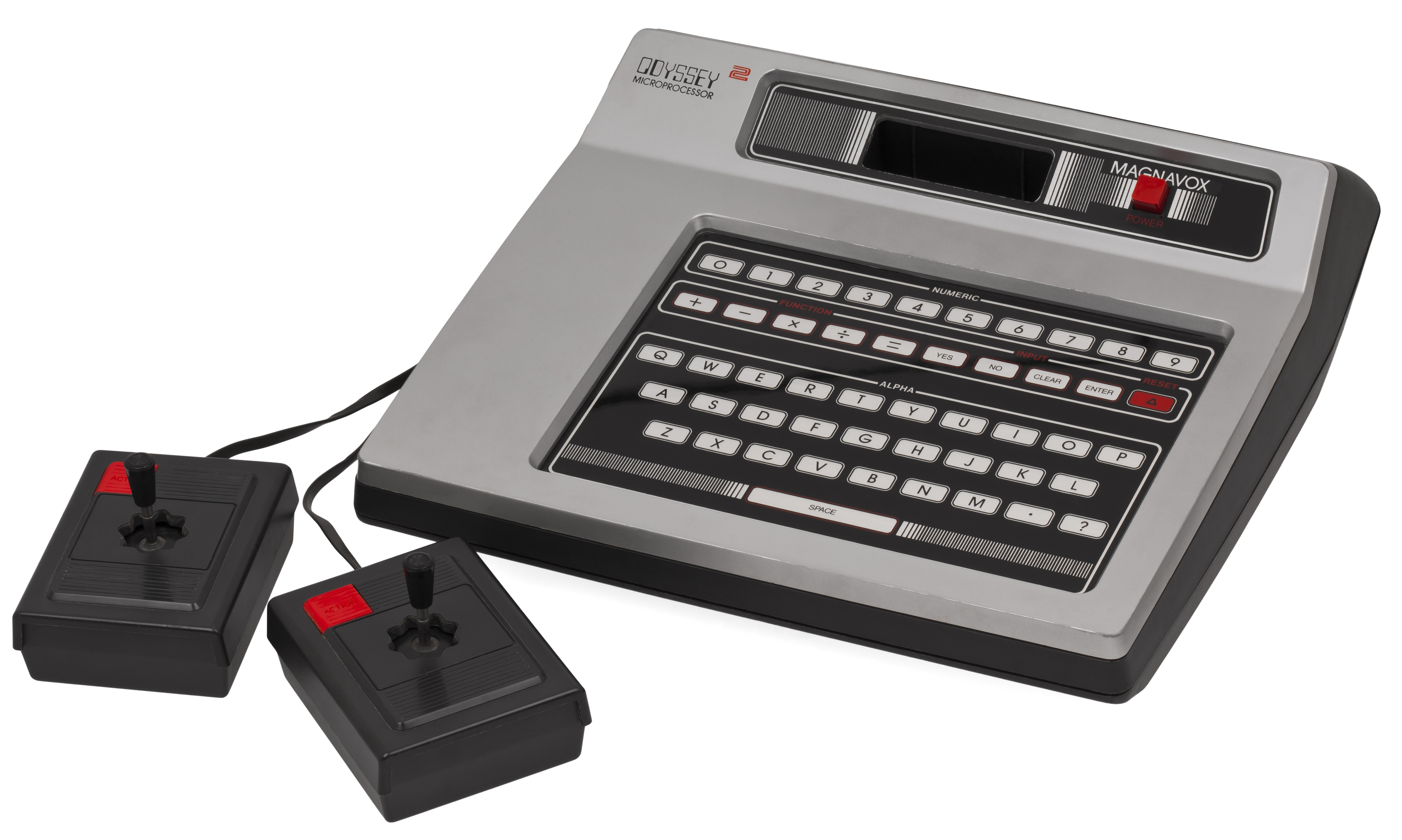
- Shown with two wired joysticks
- Also known as: Philips Odyssey 2 (US); Philips Videopac G7000 (EU); Philips Odyssey (Brazil/Peru); Odyssey2 (Japan)
- Developer: Magnavox; Philips
- Manufacturer: Magnavox; Philips
- Product family: Magnavox Odyssey series Philips Odyssey series
- Type: Home video game console
- Generation: Second generation
- Released: NA: September 1978; EU: December 1978; JP: September 1982; BR: May 1983
- Lifespan: 1978–1984
- Introductory price: US$179 (equivalent to $883.58 in 2025)
- Discontinued: 20 March 1984
- Units sold: 2 million
- CPU: Intel 8048
- Memory: 192 bytes RAM (64 in the CPU, 128 external), 1024 bytes ROM in the CPU
- Removable storage: ROM cartridge
- Display: Intel 8244
- Graphics: 160×200 pixels, 16 colors (4-bit RGBI)
- Controller input: Joysticks
- Predecessor: Magnavox Odyssey/Philips Odyssey 2100
- Successor: Philips Videopac+ G7400

The Magnavox Odyssey 2 (stylized as Magnavox Odyssey^{2}), also known as Philips Odyssey 2, is a home video game console of the second generation that was released in 1978. It was sold in Europe as the Philips Videopac G7000, in Brazil and Peru as the Philips Odyssey and in Japan as Odyssey2 (オデッセイ2 odessei2). The Odyssey 2 faced competition from a number of other consoles, including the Atari 2600, Intellivision, and Colecovision, prior to its discontinuation following the video game crash of 1983.

In the early 1970s, Magnavox pioneered the home video game industry by successfully bringing the first home console to market, the Odyssey, which was quickly followed by a number of later models, each with a few technological improvements. In 1978, Magnavox, now a subsidiary of North American Philips, decided to release an all-new successor, Odyssey 2.

In 2009, the video game website IGN named the Odyssey 2 the 21st greatest video game console, out of a list of 25.

== History ==
=== Background ===
The Magnavox Odyssey, initially designed by Ralph Baer at Sanders Associates, was sold by Magnavox in 1972. It was the first commercial video game console, but was only a modest commercial and consumer success. Magnavox had licensed a number of key video game patents, however, which enabled them to sue Atari in 1974. In July 1975, Magnavox was fully acquired by North American Philips (N.A.P.).

Intel engineer Stan Mazor, one of the designers on the world's first microprocessor the Intel 4004, was interested in moving the company into the video game space. Mazor reached out to Magnavox console design lead Gene Kale, and the two companies reached a partnership. Magnavox began designing a new console based around the Intel 8048 microcontroller. In 1975, Intel began development on a graphics chip commissioned by Kale and his team known as the Intel 8244. It was the world's first programmable sprite-based graphics chip.

=== Development ===
In early 1977, Magnavox president Alfred DiScipio announced they had begun development on a microprocessor-based video game console, which they hoped to ship by the Christmas season. The decision was made to buy almost all of the internal components from Intel, including the Intel 8048 central processing unit, the Intel 8244 graphics chip, and the system's RAM and ROM. The lead designer for the console, which would eventually become the Magnavox Odyssey², was Roberto Lenarducci; Lenarducci would be the contributor responsible for adding a keyboard to its system.

Intel faced a production error with the 8244 which put a delay on the release of the system. In August 1977, Magnavox management contemplated ending the Odyssey² project and laying off most of its staff. Ralph Baer, who was otherwise mostly uninvolved with the project, flew to the Magnavox's video game offices in Knoxville, Tennessee to convince management it was worth salvaging. Magnavox president DiScipio, along with Magnavox's senior vice president John Fauth, ultimately decided to go ahead with the project. Soon after, an executive named Mike Staup was named vice president of "interactive devices", which included video tape recorders, laserdiscs, and video games.

Development on the first batch of games was the responsibility of software developer Sam Overton. According to Baer, Overton was the only software developer working on the project at Magnavox. Game packaging and marketing materials were produced by artist Rob Bradford and designer Steve Lehner of Bradford/Cout Design, a marketing firm based in Skokie, Illinois. Lehner and Bradford had previously produced many of the materials for the original Magnavox Odyssey.

=== Release ===
The Odyssey² was initially planned for release in North America in June 1978. By March, the release had been pushed back to early fall. According to Television Digest Weekly, a high level of defective chips sent by Intel may have been a cause for the delay. The Odyssey² began shipping to retailers in September 1978. It came with a suggested retail price of $179.95 with eight games available at launch. A ninth game, Computer Intro!, was planned for launch but was released later in 1979. The console sold about 100,000 units in its first year.

Sometime after the console went into production, Magnavox once again considered shelving the project. Software developer Sam Overton left Magnavox for Milton Bradley leaving no game development staff left. Ed Averett, a sales representative at Intel working with the Intel 8244, thought he could save the project by developing new games. Averett recalls telling his boss, Andy Grove, that he "could sell more silicon for Intel if [he] programmed games for the Odyssey 2 than if [he] stayed." Magnavox accepted his offer to produce new titles in exchange for royalties, with his first batch of games releasing in 1979. Working out of his home in Chattanooga, Tennessee, Ed and his wife Linda developed 25 games for the system as freelance developers. Until 1981, he was the only North American Odyssey² developer.

In Europe, the console was released by the Dutch counterpart to N.A.P., Philips N.V., who renamed it to the Philips Videopac G7000 with all new packaging and marketing. It initially launched in December 1978, but after selling 7,500 units the product was recalled due to a faulty power plug. It began shipping again in the summer of 1979, selling for £150 in the UK. Several original games were also developed for the European market. Jon Shuttleworth, who played a key role in the design of these games and the redesign of the console for PAL regions, said they were aiming to appeal to the "peaceful" Europeans who "would like things more slanted to their "delicate" taste." Shuttleworth says that some of the games were developed internally but others were designed by a company in Sweden and then programmed by a company called GST.

In North America, the Odyssey² was a moderate success, despite being a side project for Magnavox and receiving little marketing. By the end of 1980, it had sold 385,000 lifetime units and held about 10% of the market, better than all its competitors except for the Atari 2600 (which had sold over two million units). It would soon be eclipsed in sales by the Intellivision and later the ColecoVision. According to Averett, Magnavox and Philips were always close to shutting the project down despite every game produced selling out. In Europe, the Videopac G7000 faired far better, being a reasonable success.

In February 1981, Magnavox Consumer Electronics was renamed to the North American Philips Consumer Electronics Company following N.A.P.'s acquisition of Philco and Sylvania. By the end of 1981, new Odyssey² products had dropped the Magnavox branding in exchange for a new video game label also named "Odyssey".

=== K.C. Munchkin! and the video game boom ===
By the end of 1980, Namco's arcade hit Pac-Man began appearing in North American arcades. It was an unprecedented commercial success, outselling a number of Hollywood blockbusters. Following the success, N.A.P. executive Mike Staup and programmer Ed Averett played the game in an airport arcade and decided to create a version for the Odyssey². While this version was in development, N.A.P. attempted to acquire the home console rights for Pac-Man without realizing they had already been licensed to Atari. N.A.P. decided to strip the license and release the game in 1981 as K.C. Munchkin!, beating Atari's version to market by several months.

K.C. Munchkin! was a massive hit. According to N.A.P. representative Ed Williams, the game outsold every previous Odyssey² title combined within the span of two months. This success drove Philips to put more investment into the Odyssey². In 1981, N.A.P. decided to rehire Sam Overton, who lead a new team of developers including Jim Butler and Bob Harris. Philips also released its Master Strategy series, three video game/board game hybrids that were critically well received despite their high prices.

In 1981, Atari sued N.A.P. Consumer Electronics for copyright infringement over K.C. Munchkin. The ensuing court case, Atari, Inc. v. North American Philips Consumer Electronics Corp., was one of the first trials involving video game copyright law. N.A.P. was confident going in and won a motion hearing for a preliminary injection, but the ruling was overturned on appeal. In March 1982 following the ruling, K.C. Munchkin! was pulled from the market. Undeterred, N.A.P. released a sequel titled K.C.'s Krazy Chase!, that released alongside a voice module expansion known as "The Voice of Odyssey²" in September 1982. The Odyssey² was also featured at the 1982 World's Fair in Knoxville, Tennessee, which hosted a nationwide Pick Axe Pete! tournament.

In Europe, the Videopac never received "The Voice" module. It did receive an exclusive chess module called the Videopac C7010. It was released as a separate unit containing its own Z80-compatible processor, and first showed up in the UK in April 1983. In 1983, Europe also received a hardware revision known as the Videopac G7200, which included a built in black and white screen and SCART port but was otherwise entirely compatible with the forty Videopac games released to that point. The Odyssey² was also released in Japan in December 1982 where it made little impact. It was considerably more successful in Brazil, where it launched as the Philips Odyssey in May 1983 and received strong support.

=== Odyssey 3 ===
In an April 1982 press conference, N.A.P. announced the development of a successor system, the Odyssey 3 (stylized as Odyssey³), planned for release in mid 1983. In a different press conference, representatives said they were still unsure whether the system would be positioned as a video game console or a home computer. It was showcased at Winter CES 1983, now renamed as the Odyssey Command Center. The console was announced as fully compatible with all previous Odyssey² titles with included peripheral ports for Voice compatibility. N.A.P. showcased updated version of games such as Pick Axe Pete! and Freedom Fighters! with more graphically rich backgrounds. The system was set for a release in July 1983 at a suggested retail price of $199. A peripheral that expanded the system into a home computer platform with 16 KB of RAM was planned for a Christmas launch.

At Summer CES in June 1983, N.A.P. announced that the North American release of the Odyssey 3 would be delayed to early 1984. Mike Staup said "We are convinced that the computer capability must be built in to the unit rather than as an outboarded capability as announced in December." N.A.P. instead announced the development of third party titles for the Atari 2600 and the ColecoVision under the Probe 2000 label, these included licensed titles Power Lords and The Adventures of the Pink Panther (which was ultimately cancelled). The Odyssey 3 was released in Europe as the Philips Videopac+ G7400 in late 1983. The Odyssey 3 never released in North America. According to N.A.P. spokesman Jerry Michaelson, they choose not to release the console in the United States because they were "leapfrogging to the next [generation]."

By the end of the year, Philips began responding to the video game crash of 1983. In October 1983, following the release of the first Probe 2000 game War Room for the ColecoVision, Odyssey announced it had cancelled its Probe 2000 line and all future Odyssey² titles. This followed a budget cut from N.A.P. which left research and development barely enough money to produce a single game. In March 1984, North American Philips announced they were halting all video game production and dissolving the Odyssey brand. This included the discontinuation of the Odyssey². According to N.A.P.C.E.C. representative Pat Wilson, "general market conditions" were the cause for the decision.

== Design ==
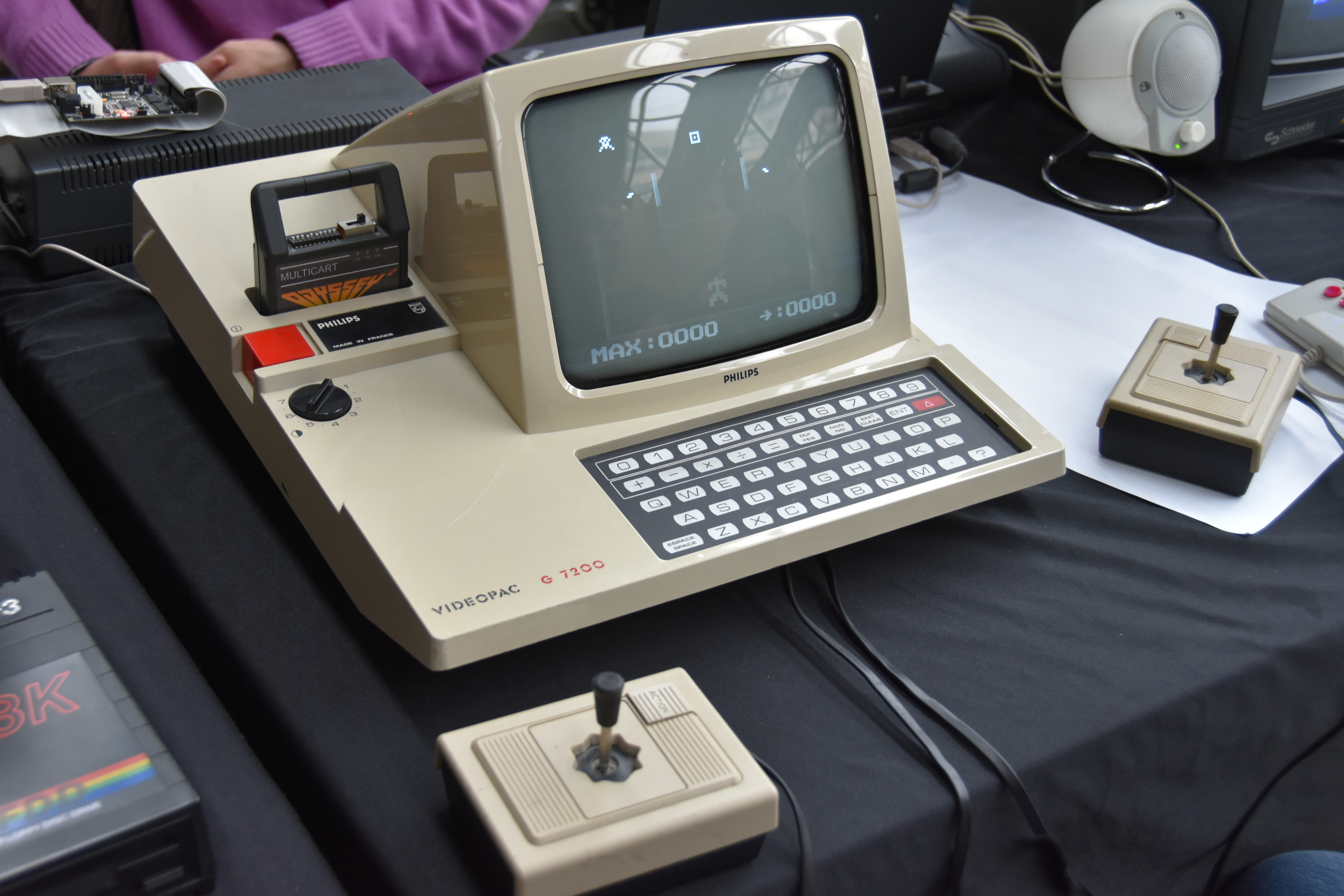
The Videopac G7200, unlike Videopac G7000, had a 9" (23 cm) black & white display built in.

The original Odyssey had a number of removable circuit cards that switched between the built-in games. With the Odyssey 2, each game could be a unique experience, with its own foreground graphics, gameplay, scoring, and music (some Odyssey 2 games were later re-released for the G7400 with added background and updated foreground graphics that the Odyssey 2 was not capable of displaying). The potential was enormous, as an unlimited number of games could be individually purchased; a game player could purchase a library of video games tailored to their own interest. Unlike any other system at that time, the Odyssey 2 included a full alphanumeric membrane keyboard, which was to be used for educational games, selecting options, or programming (Magnavox released a cartridge called Computer Intro! with the intent of teaching simple computer programming).

The Odyssey 2 used the standard joystick design of the 1970s and early 1980s: the original console had a moderately sized silver controller, held in one hand, with a square housing for its eight-direction stick that was manipulated with the other hand. Later releases had a similar black controller, with an 8-pointed star-shaped housing for its eight-direction joystick. In the upper corner of the joystick was a single 'Action' button, silver on the original controllers and red on the black controllers. The games, graphics and packaging were designed by Ron Bradford and Steve Lehner.

During the time of Odyssey 2's manufacturing, some came with controllers that could be plugged and unplugged from the back of the unit via their DB9 connector, while others had their controllers hardwired into the rear of the base unit itself.

One of the strongest points of the system was its speech synthesis unit, which was released as an add-on for speech, music, and sound effects enhancement. The area that the Odyssey 2 may be best remembered for was its pioneering fusion of board and video games: The Master Strategy Series. The first game released was Quest for the Rings!, with gameplay somewhat similar to Dungeons & Dragons, and a storyline reminiscent of J. R. R. Tolkien's The Lord of the Rings. Later, two other games were released in this series, Conquest of the World and The Great Wall Street Fortune Hunt, each with its own gameboard.

Its graphics and few color choices, compared to its biggest competitors at the time—the Atari 2600, Mattel's Intellivision and the Bally Astrocade—were its "weakest point". Of these systems, the Odyssey 2 was listed by Jeff Rovin as being the third in total of sales, and one of the seven major video game suppliers.

=== Technical specifications ===
The 64 symbols within the character set of the Magnavox Odyssey 2. Characters can take one of eight colors.

- CPU
  - Intel 8048 8-bit microcontroller running at 5.37 MHz (NTSC) or 5.91 MHz (PAL)
- Memory:
  - CPU-internal RAM: 64 bytes
  - CPU-external RAM: 128 bytes
  - Audio/video RAM: 128 bytes
  - BIOS ROM: 1024 bytes
- Video:
  - Intel 8244 (NTSC) or 8245 (PAL) custom IC
  - 160×200 resolution (NTSC)
  - 16-color fixed palette (8 basic colors - black, blue, green, cyan, red, magenta, yellow and white - with a half-brightness variation (4-bit RGBI)); sprites may only use 8 of these colors
  - 4 8×8 single-color user-defined sprites; each sprite's color may be set independently
  - 12 8×8 single-color characters; must be one of the 64 shapes built into the ROM BIOS; can be freely positioned like sprites, but cannot overlap each other; each character's color may be set independently
  - 4 quad characters; groups of four characters displayed in a row
  - 9×8 background grid; dots, lines, or solid blocks
- Audio:
  - Intel 8244/8245 custom IC
  - mono
  - 24-bit shift register, clockable at 2 frequencies
  - noise generator
  - NOTE: There is only one 8244/8245 chip in the system, which performs both audio and video functions.
- Input:
  - Two 8-way, one-button, digital joysticks. In the first production runs of the Magnavox Odyssey and the Philips 7000, these were removable and replaceable; in later models, they were permanently attached to the console.
  - QWERTY-layout membrane keyboard
- Output:
  - RF Audio/Video connector
  - Péritel/SCART connector (France only Videopac C52)
- Media:
  - ROM cartridges, typically 2 KB, 4 KB, or 8 KB in size.

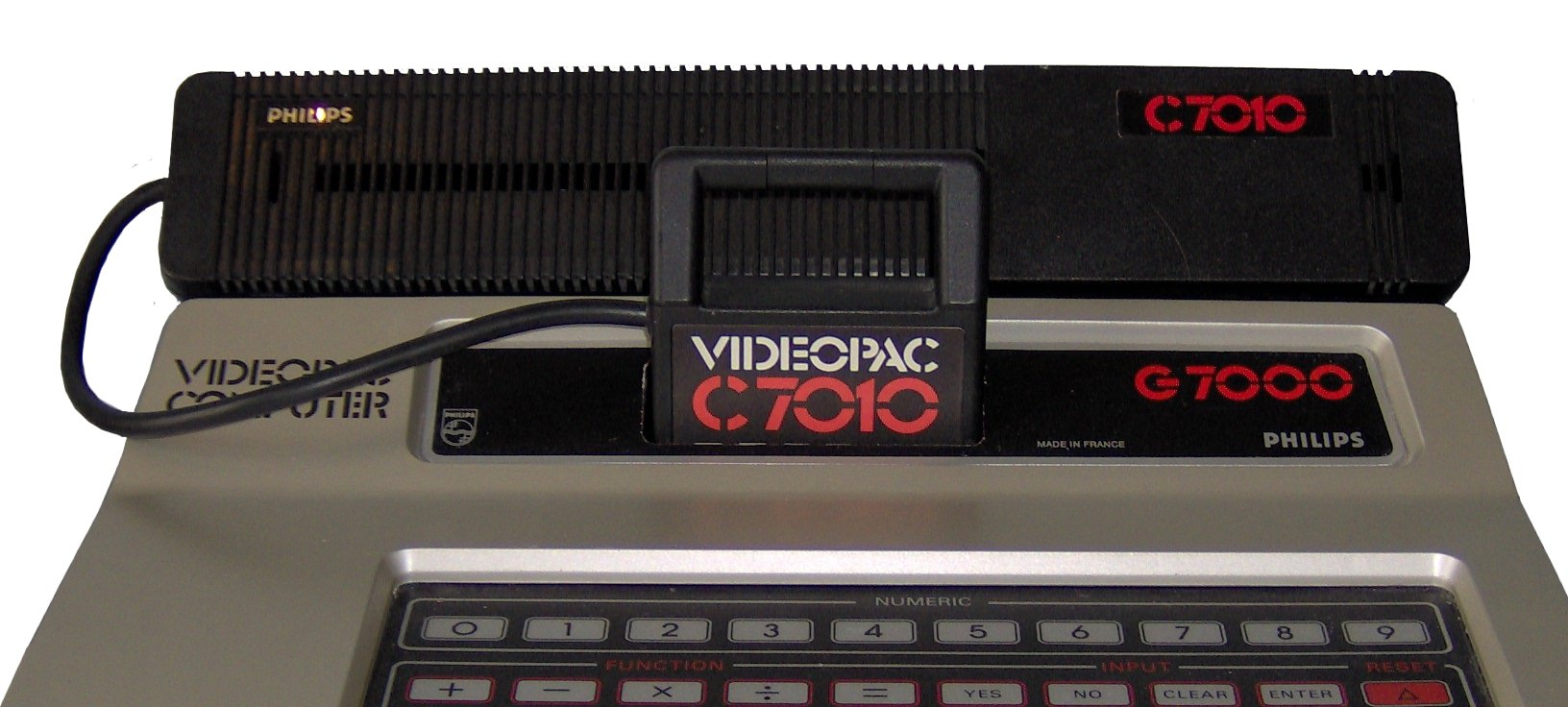
Videopac with chess module

- Expansion modules:
  - The Voice: provides speech synthesis and enhanced sound effects. Unlike Intellivoice, games compatible with The Voice did not require it; Danny Goodman of Creative Computing Video & Arcade Games predicted "that eliminates any incentive to buy the $100 voice module".
  - Chess Module: the Odyssey 2 did not have enough memory and computing power for a decent implementation of chess on its own, so the C7010 chess module contained a secondary NSC800 CPU with its own extra memory to run the chess program Gambiet 80
  - Videopac+/Jopac-compatible only, Microsoft Basic. The rare C7420 Home Computer Module, made available in 1983 by Philips, was a costly extension for the newer Videopac+ and Jopac consoles only. It went with a thick A4 manual, and required an optional external tape recorder to save the programs. This module was the sole valuable justification of the presence of a so-called keyboard, which was supposedly designed to look like a hybrid educational toy, as read in header lines describing earlier this family of pluri-purpose consoles, even in the TV commercials that echoed the slogan written on these brand-new machines: "Video Computer". Unfortunately, this late niche concept, even limited to learning game code contrary to the more professional packaging, could not resist at all the already overwhelming market of the real 8-bit home computers, where the Atari 400 shared the same look in 1979, surprisingly. [The latter was advertised itself: « The affordable home computer that's easy to use even for people who've never used a computer before ».] This expensive module is not to be confused with the cheap cartridge #9: Computer Intro!)

== Market life ==
=== United States ===
The console sold moderately well in the U.S. Prior to the nationwide release of the Mattel Intellivision in 1980, the console video game market was dominated by the competition between the Odyssey 2 and Atari 2600. It remained one of the three primary consoles from 1980 to mid-1982, though a distant third behind the Atari 2600 and Mattel Intellivision.

To sell would-be customers on its resemblance to a home computer, the Odyssey 2 was marketed with phrases such as "The Ultimate Computer Video Game System", "Sync-Sound Action", "True-Reality Synthesization", "On-Screen Digital Readouts" and "a serious educational tool" on the packaging for the console and its game cartridges. All games, aside from Showdown in 2100 AD, produced by Magnavox/Philips ended with an exclamation point, such as K.C. Munchkin! and Killer Bees!.

No third-party game appeared for the Odyssey 2 in the United States until Imagic's Demon Attack in 1983. The lack of third-party support kept the number of new games very limited, but the success of the Philips Videopac G7000 overseas led to two other companies producing games for it: Parker Brothers released Popeye, Frogger, Q*bert and Super Cobra, while Imagic also released Atlantis.

=== Europe ===
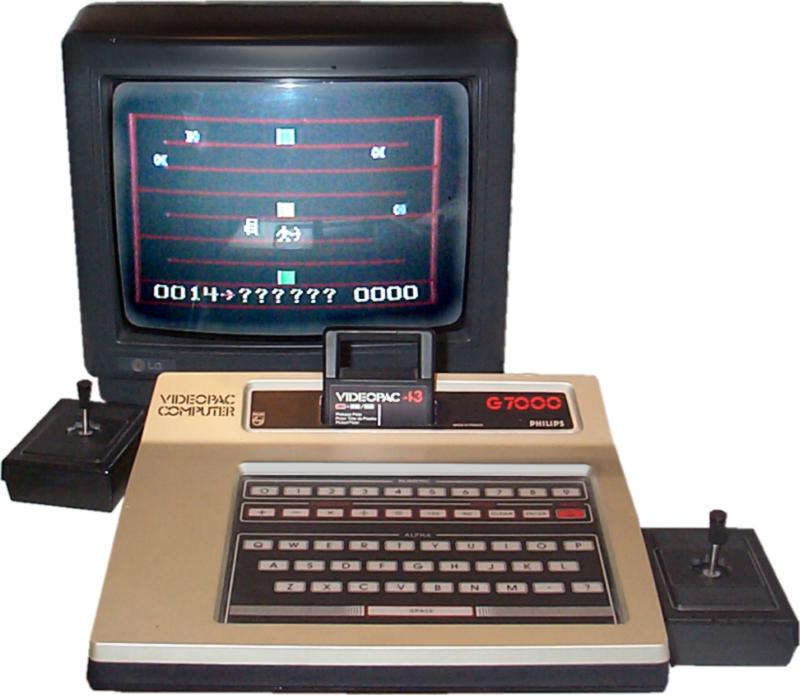
European models had no power button, and black action buttons.

In Europe, the Odyssey 2 performed especially well on the market. The console was most widely known as the Philips Videopac G7000, or just the Videopac, although branded variants were released in some areas of Europe under the names Philips Videopac C52, Radiola Jet 25, Schneider 7000, and Siera G7000. Philips used their own name rather than Magnavox's for European marketing. A rare model, the Philips Videopac G7200, was only released in Europe; it had a built-in black-and-white monitor. Videopac game cartridges are mostly compatible with American Odyssey 2 units, although some games have color differences and a few are completely incompatible, such as Frogger on the European console, being unable to show the second half of the playing field, and Chess on the American model, as the extra hardware module could not work with the console. A number of additional games were released in Europe that never came out in the U.S.

=== Brazil ===
In Brazil, the console was released simply as Philips Odyssey (since the original Odyssey had had only a limited release by a local company, Planil Comércio, under license). The Odyssey 2 became much more popular in Brazil than it ever was in the U.S.; tournaments were even held for popular games like K.C.'s Krazy Chase! (Come-Come! in Brazil). Titles of games were translated into Portuguese, sometimes creating a new story, like Pick-axe Pete!, that became Didi na Mina Encantada! (Didi in the Enchanted Mine) referring to Renato Aragão's comedy character, and was one of the most famous Odyssey games in Brazil.

=== Japan ===
The Odyssey 2 was released in Japan in December 1982 by Kōton Trading Toitarii Enterprise (コートン・トレーディング・トイタリー・エンタープライズ, a division of DINGU company) under the name オデッセイ2 (odessei2). "Japanese" versions of the Odyssey 2 and its games consisted of the American boxes with katakana stickers on them and cheaply printed black-and-white Japanese manuals. The initial price for the console was ¥49,800, which is approximately US$200 (equivalent to about $670 in 2025). It was apparently not very successful; Japanese Odyssey 2 items are now very difficult to find.

== Emulation ==
An open source Odyssey 2 console emulator called O2EM is available for Windows, Linux, and as part of OpenEmu, Mac OS X.

== See also ==
- Magnavox Odyssey Series
- Magnavox Odyssey
- Philips Videopac + G7400
