= History of copyright law of the United States =

The history of copyright law of the United States reflects a long-standing attempt to balance the needs of creators, publishers, and the public. It was established as federal law with the Copyright Act of 1790, focusing primarily on printed books and maps. This act was updated many times, including a major revision in 1976, to become a comlex legal framework that today governs literature, music, visual art, film, software, and digital media.

== Colonial era ==
The British Statute of Anne did not apply to the American colonies. Printing was restricted in the colonies, and most authors who published at all chose to do so in England. As a result, prior to 1783, there were no copyright acts of general applicability passed in the colonies; although there were three cases of private acts bestowing copyright upon specific authors for their works for only a short term of years.

== 1783 to 1787 ==
In 1783, several authors' petitions persuaded the Congress of the Confederation "that nothing is more properly a man's own than the fruit of his study, and that the protection and security of literary property would greatly tend to encourage genius and to promote useful discoveries." However, under the Articles of Confederation, the Continental Congress had no authority to issue a copyright. Instead it passed a resolution encouraging the states to "secure to the authors or publishers of any new book not hitherto printed ... the copy right of such books for a certain time not less than fourteen years from the first publication; and to secure to the said authors, if they shall survive the term first mentioned, ... the copy right of such books for another term of time no less than fourteen years." Three states had already enacted copyright statutes in 1783 prior to the Continental Congress resolution, and in the subsequent three years all of the remaining states except Delaware passed a copyright statute. Seven of the states followed the Statute of Anne and the Continental Congress' resolution by providing two fourteen-year terms. The five remaining states granted copyright for single terms of fourteen, twenty and twenty one years, with no right of renewal.

Prior to the passage of the United States Constitution, several states passed their own copyright laws between 1783 and 1787, the first being Connecticut. Contemporary scholars and patriots such as Noah Webster, John Trumbull, and Joel Barlow were instrumental in securing the passage of these statutes.

== United States Constitution ==
=== Copyright Clause ===
At the Constitutional Convention of 1787 both James Madison of Virginia and Charles C. Pinckney of South Carolina submitted proposals that would allow Congress the power to grant copyright for a limited time. These proposals are the origin of the Copyright Clause in the United States Constitution, which states:

The Congress shall have Power ... to promote the Progress of Science and useful Arts, by securing for limited Times to Authors and Inventors the exclusive Right to their respective Writings and Discoveries.

— United States Constitution, Article I, Section 8, clause 8.

This clause is understood to grant Congress the power to enact copyright laws. The Copyright Clause forms the basis for both U.S. copyright law ("Science", "Authors", "Writings") and patent law ("useful Arts", "Inventors", "Discoveries"), and requires that these exclusive rights expire ("for limited Times").

=== Failed bill of rights provision ===
Thomas Jefferson, who strongly advocated the ability of the public to share and build upon the works of others, suggested limiting copyright duration in the Bill of Rights, proposing the language:

Art. 9. Monopolies may be allowed to persons for their own productions in literature and their own inventions in the arts for a term not exceeding – years but for no longer term and no other purpose.

== Early federal copyright law ==
=== Copyright Act of 1790 ===
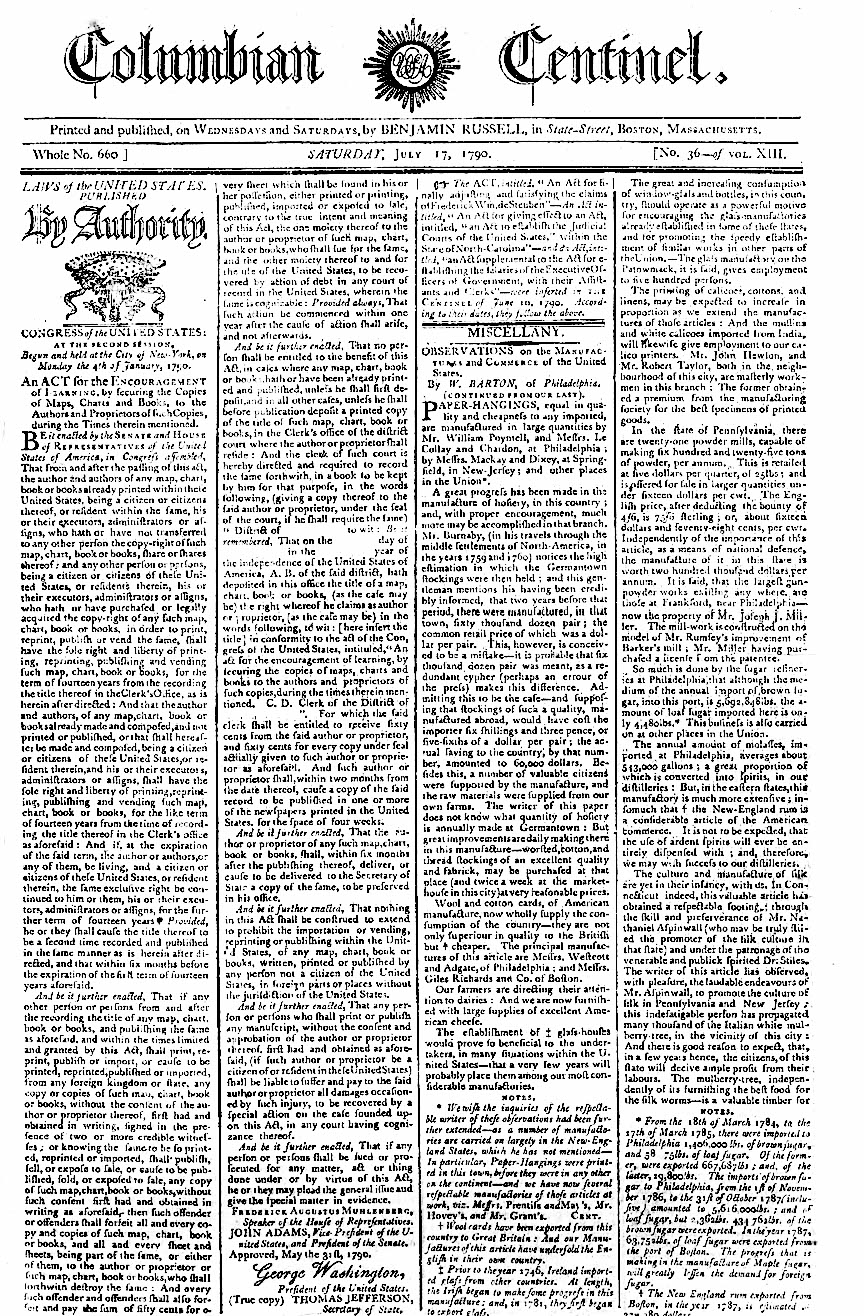
The Copyright Act of 1790 in the Columbian Centinel, full title "An act for the encouragement of learning by securing the copies of maps, charts, and books, to the authors and proprietors of such copies, during the times therein mentioned"

The Congress first exercised its copyright powers with the Copyright Act of 1790. This act granted authors the exclusive right to publish and vend "maps, charts and books" for a term of 14 years. This 14-year term was renewable for one additional 14-year term, if the author was alive at the end of the first time. With exception of the provision on maps and charts the Copyright Act of 1790 is copied almost verbatim from the Statute of Anne.

The 1790 Act did not regulate other kinds of writings, such as musical compositions or newspapers and specifically noted that it did not prohibit copying the works of foreign authors. Foreign works were still unprotected after the 1831 and 1870 Copyright Acts, though from the 1820s the US started entering into bilateral agreements with other countries. The Chace Act of 1891 enforced copyright of all foreign countries who reciprocally protected US copyright. Various groups representing the interests of British authors had made petitions regarding copyright in 1837, 1838, 1853, 1868, 1870, 1878, and 1880.

The vast majority of writings were never registered. Between 1790 and 1799, of approximately 13,000 titles published in the United States, only 556 works were registered. Under the 1790 Act, federal copyright protection was only granted if the author met certain "statutory formalities." For example, authors were required to include a proper copyright notice. If formalities were not met, the work immediately entered into the public domain.

And while musical compositions were not explicitly protected by the 1790 Act, its protection of "books" encompassed printed musical works. The first registration of a copyright in a musical composition in the United States was The Kentucky Volunteer in 1794. However, later accounts of the 1790 Act frequently misunderstand this point.

=== Copyright Act of 1831 ===
Congress first revised the copyright laws with the Copyright Act of 1831. This act extended the original copyright term from 14 years to 28 years (with an option to renew), and changed the copyright formality requirements.

In 1834, the Supreme Court ruled in Wheaton v. Peters (a case similar to the British Donaldson v Beckett of 1774) that although the author of an unpublished work had a common law right to control the first publication of that work, the author did not have a common law right to control reproduction following the first publication of the work.

During the American Civil War, the law of the Confederate States of America on copyright was broadly the same as that of the existing Copyright Act of 1831: twenty-eight years with an extension for fourteen, with mandatory registration. This was passed into law by an act in May 1861, shortly after the outbreak of hostilities. A later amendment, in April 1863, provided that any copyright registered in the United States before secession, and held by a current Confederate citizen or resident, was legally valid within the Confederacy. Confederate copyrights were apparently honored after the end of the war; when federal copyright records were transferred to the Library of Congress in 1870.

=== International Copyright Act of 1891 ===
The International Copyright Act of 1891 (26 Stat. 1106, March 3, 1891) is the first U.S. congressional act that extended limited protection to foreign copyright holders from select nations. Formally known as the "International Copyright Act of 1891", but more commonly referred to as the "Chace Act" after Sen. Jonathan Chace of Rhode Island.

The International Copyright Act of 1891 was the first U.S. congressional act that offered copyright protection in the United States to citizens of countries other than the United States. The act allowed the President to enter the United States in bilateral copyright treaties, extending copyright to the works of nationals from signatory countries and receiving copyright for the works of Americans in that signatory country.

The act was passed on March 3, 1891, by the 51st Congress. The Act went into effect on July 1, 1891. On July 3, 1891, the first foreign work, a play called Saints and Sinners by British author Henry Arthur Jones, was registered under the act.

The act contained a manufacturing clause was a clause requiring that as a condition of obtaining copyright, all copies of a work must be printed or otherwise produced domestically, from plates set domestically, rather than imported. The clause initially covered books, maps, photographs, and lithographs, and was subsequently extended to periodicals as well. Its extension to all other media was proposed in the 1897 Treloar Copyright Bill, which failed in committee. The manufacturing clause did not expire until 1986, keeping the United States out of the Berne Convention until 1989.

== Early 1900s ==
The turn of the 20th century introduced two lasting changes to the practice of copyright law in the US, both in quick succession at the end of the first decade. In particular, the Copyright Act of 1909 introduced the concept of mechanical reproduction, as a legislative response to codify the relationship of piano rolls to compositions in the wake of the White-Smith Music Publishing Company v. Apollo Company decision. This mechanical classification, and the compulsory license imposed upon it, remains in force today and is extended to apply to cover versions.

The next year, the Buenos Aires Convention of 1910 provided mutual recognition of copyright between most countries who were members of the Pan American Union, and was ratified by the United States in 1911. Not all countries in the Americas were signatories. Canada in particular was not a signatory, because it was ineligible for membership in the Pan American Union: the union was limited to American republics, and Canada was not deemed an independent state separate from the United Kingdom. However, Canada and the United States subsequently entered into a bilateral agreement by presidential proclamation under which each of the two countries extended copyright protection to the other, effective January 1, 1924.

== Pre-1978 dual state and federal copyright law ==
Before the 1976 Copyright Act, copyright protection was provided by a dual system under both federal and state laws. Federal law under the 1909 Copyright Act protected works that were published or registered, and state copyright laws, including "common law copyright", protected works that were unpublished and unregistered.

As of January 1, 1978, the effective date of the 1976 Copyright Act, Congress abolished the dual federal-and-state copyright system, replacing it with a single federal copyright system. Federal preemption is codified at 17 U.S.C. § 301(a), which states:

On and after January 1, 1978, all legal or equitable rights that are equivalent to any of the exclusive rights within the general scope of copyright ... in works of authorship that ... come within the subject matter of copyright ... are governed exclusively by this title. Thereafter, no person is entitled to any such right or equivalent right in any such work under the common law or statutes of any State.

The preemption is complete insofar as works fall within the federal copyright statute. A work that falls generally within the subject matter of copyright (such as a writing) must either qualify to be protected under federal law, or it cannot be protected at all. State law cannot provide protection for a work that federal law does not protect. It covers enforcement too. A person accused of copyright infringement cannot be prosecuted in state courts.

State copyright law is not preempted by non-protected works. For example, those that have "not been fixed in any tangible medium of expression are not covered." "Examples would include choreography that has never been filmed or notated, an extemporaneous speech, original works of authorship communicated solely through conversations or live broadcasts, a dramatic sketch or musical composition improvised or developed from memory and without being recorded or written down."

== Major amendments to federal copyright law ==
Since 1790, Congress has amended federal copyright law numerous times. Major amendments include:

- Copyright Act of 1790 – established U.S. copyright with term of 14 years with 14-year renewal
- Copyright Act of 1831 – extended the term to 28 years with 14-year renewal
- Copyright Act of 1909 – established a compulsory license for mechanical reproduction of musical works, which would eventually become used to justify cover versions.
- Copyright Act of 1976 – extended term to either 75 years or the life of the author plus 50 years (prior to this, "[t]he interim renewal acts of 1962 through 1974 ensured that the copyright in any work in its second term as of September 19, 1962, would not expire before Dec. 31, 1976."); extended federal copyright to unpublished works; preempted state copyright laws; codified much copyright doctrine that had originated in case law
- Berne Convention Implementation Act of 1988 – established copyrights of U.S. works in Berne Convention countries
- Copyright Renewal Act of 1992 – removed the requirement for renewal
- Uruguay Round Agreements Act (URAA) of 1994 – restored U.S. copyright for certain foreign works
- Copyright Term Extension Act of 1998 – extended terms to 95/120 years or life plus 70 years
- Digital Millennium Copyright Act of 1998 (DMCA) – criminalized some cases of copyright infringement and established the Section 512 notice-and-takedown regime.
- Music Modernization Act (MMA) of 2018 – Modernized copyright-related issues for music and other audio recordings to address technological developments such as digital streaming. Title II of the MMA, the CLASSICS Act, preempted state copyright laws for sound recordings made before February 15, 1972.

Key international agreements affecting U.S. copyright law include:

- Universal Copyright Convention
- Berne Convention for the Protection of Literary and Artistic Works
- Agreement on Trade-Related Aspects of Intellectual Property Rights (TRIPS)

The United States ratified the Universal Copyright Convention in 1954, and again in 1971. This treaty was developed by UNESCO as an alternative to the Berne Convention.

The United States became a Berne Convention signatory in 1988. The Berne Convention entered into force in the U.S. a year later, on March 1, 1989. The U.S. is also a party to TRIPS, which requires compliance with Berne provisions, and is enforceable under the World Trade Organization dispute resolution process.

To meet the treaty requirements, copyright protection was extended to architecture (where previously only building plans were protected, not buildings themselves), and certain moral rights of visual artists.

== Notable cases ==
Fixation

- White-Smith Music Publishing Company v. Apollo Company (1908)
- Midway Manufacturing Co. v. Artic International, Inc. (N.D. Ill. 1982)

Originality

- Burrow-Giles Lithographic Co. v. Sarony (1884)
- Bridgeman Art Library v. Corel Corp. (SDNY 1999)

Idea/expression dichotomy

- Baker v. Selden (1880)
- Whelan v. Jaslow (1986)
- Broderbund v. Unison (N.D. Cal. 1986)
- Computer Associates Int'l, Inc. v. Altai Inc. (2d Cir. 1992)

Fair use

- Suntrust v. Houghton Mifflin (11th Cir. 2001) (re Parody)
