= Whelan v. Jaslow =

- Court: United States Court of Appeals for the Third Circuit
- Full case name: Whelan Assocs., Inc. v. Jaslow Dental Laboratory, Inc.
- Argued: 3 March 1986
- Decided: 4 August 1986
- Citations: 797 F.2d 1222; 1240 (3d Cir. 1986); 479 U.S. 1031 (1987);

Court membership
- Judges sitting: GIBBONS, BECKER, and ROSENN, Circuit Judges

Case opinions
- Copyright protection of computer programs may extend beyond the programs' literal code to their structure, sequence and organization

Keywords
- copyright infringement, non-literal elements, substantial similarity

Whelan Assocs., Inc. v. Jaslow Dental Laboratory, Inc. (3rd Cir. 1986) was a landmark case in defining principles that applied to copyright of computer software in the United States, extending beyond literal copying of the text to copying the more abstract structure, sequence and organization. The decision initiated a six-year period (until Computer Associates Int. Inc. v. Altai Inc.) of heightened copyright protection for computer programs.

== Background of the case ==
In 1978 Rand Jaslow tried to build a computer program to handle customer management, billing, accounting, inventory management and other functions for Jaslow Dental Laboratories. He gave up after a few months and hired Strohl Systems to do the job. The software was built by the half-owner of Strohl, Elaine Whelan, and delivered in March 1979. It was written in the EDL language and ran on an IBM Series/1 minicomputer. Strohl kept ownership of the software, which was branded Dentalab, and could license it to other companies in exchange for a 10% commission to Jaslow. In November 1979 Whelan left Strohl and set up her own business, acquiring the right to the software.

Later, Jaslow became engaged in selling the Dentalab software in exchange for a percentage of the gross sales. He formed a company named Dentcom which in late 1982 began to develop a program in a different computer language (BASIC) but with very similar functionality called Dentlab, marketed as a Dentalab successor. The new software could run on IBM Personal Computers, giving access to a broader market. On 30 June 1983 Jaslow's company filed a suit in Pennsylvania state court alleging that Whelan had misappropriated its trade secrets. Whelan filed a countersuit in federal court in Pennsylvania alleging that the Dentlab software violated Whelan's copyrights in the Dentalab software. The district court ruled that Dentlab was substantially similar to Dentalab because its structure and overall organization were substantially similar. Jaslow appealed the decision to the U.S. Third Circuit Court of Appeals.

== Relevant law ==
The district court ruling in the Whelan case drew on the established doctrine that even when the component parts of a work cannot be copyrightable, the structure and organization of a work may be. The court also drew support from the 1985 SAS Inst. Inc. v. S&H Computer Sys. Inc. in which it had been found that copyright protected organizational and structural details, not just specific lines of code. Structure, sequence and organization (SSO) in this case was defined as "the manner in which the program operates, controls and regulates the computer in receiving, assembling, calculating, retaining, correlating, and producing useful information." SSO refers to non-literal elements of computer programs that include "data input formats, file structures, design, organization and flow of the code, screen outputs or user interfaces, and the flow and sequencing of the screens."

== Decision ==
The Court of Appeals for the Third Circuit noted that computer programs are literary works under U.S. law. The court drew an analogy with a concept defined by Judge Learned Hand who noted, talking about a play, that the exact wording was certainly protected, and then there were a series of layers of increasing abstraction before the high-level plot outline is reached, which is not protected. An ad hoc judgement based on careful comparison of the works would be needed to determine where in this spectrum any alleged copying lay, and to decide whether it was at a sufficiently specific level to be a violation rather than a different expression of the same idea. But "careful comparison" in the case of software works might involve checking millions of lines of code.

The court rejected the "extrinsic-intrinsic" test that had commonly been used until then, where an expert and a lay observer are asked to independently determine whether the works are substantially similar. The court reasoned that with literary works a non-literal element is protected to the extent that it is an expression of an idea rather than the idea itself. By analogy, the purpose or function of a software work would be the work's "idea", while everything not necessary to that purpose or function would be part of the expression of the idea. The expression would be protected, but the basic purpose or function would not. On this basis the Court of Appeals upheld the district court's ruling of copyright violation due to similarity of SSO. The court found that the Copyright Act of 1976 supported its view of a software work as a compilation (Note: In U.S. copyright law a "compilation" is defined as a work formed by the collection and assembling of preexisting materials or of data that are selected, coordinated, or arranged in such a way that the resulting work as a whole constitutes an original work of authorship.), saying:

Although the Code does not use the terms "sequence," "order," or "structure," it is clear from the definition of compilations and derivative works, and the protection afforded them, that Congress was aware of the fact that the sequencing and ordering of materials could be copyrighted, i.e. that the sequence and order could be parts of the expression, not the idea, of a work.

== Results ==
The Whelan decision initiated a period of excessively tight protection, suppressing innovation, since almost everything other than the broad purpose of a software work would be protected. The only exception was where the functionality could only be achieved in a very small number of ways. In these cases there could be no protection due to the merger doctrine, which applies when the expression and the idea are inextricably merged. Later the same year, in Broderbund v. Unison the court cited Whelan when finding that the overall structure, sequencing, and arrangement of screens, or the "total concept and feel", could be protected by copyright.
