= Structure, sequence and organization =

Structure, sequence and organization (SSO) is a term used in the United States to define a basis for comparing one software work to another in order to determine if copying has occurred that infringes on copyright, even when the second work is not a literal copy of the first. The term was introduced in the case of Whelan v. Jaslow in 1986. The method of comparing the SSO of two software products has since evolved in attempts to avoid the extremes of over-protection and under-protection, both of which are considered to discourage innovation. More recently, the concept has been used in Oracle America, Inc. v. Google, Inc.

== Whelan v. Jaslow ==
Whelan Assocs., Inc. v. Jaslow Dental Laboratory, Inc. was a landmark case in defining principles that applied to copyright of computer software. Whelan had developed software for Jaslow to manage the operations of a dental laboratory, and later took it to market under the trade name Dentalab. Jaslow became engaged in selling the Dentalab software. He later formed a new company named Dentcom and wrote a program in a different computer language but with similar functionality that he called Dentlab, marketing it as a Dentalab successor. Whelan filed a suit in federal court in Pennsylvania alleging that the Dentlab software violated Whelan's copyrights in the Dentalab software. Whelan won the case and was awarded damages on the basis that Dentlab had substantially similar structure and overall organization.

The district court ruling in Whelan drew on the established doctrine that even when the component parts of a work cannot be copyrightable, the structure and organization of a work may be. The court also drew support from the 1985 SAS Inst. Inc. v. S&H Computer Sys. Inc. in which it had been found that copyright protected organizational and structural details, not just specific lines of source or object code. (Note: Software is written in source code, a collection of instructions written in a human-readable programming language. With many languages this is translated by a compiler into object code, where the instructions are in a form that the computer can execute. Source code copying may be crudely disguised by changing the names of procedures and variables. This form of disguise will be immediately visible when the object code is compared, since the object code will be the same.) Sequence, structure and organization (SSO) in this case was defined as "the manner in which the program operates, controls and regulates the computer in receiving, assembling, calculating, retaining, correlating, and producing useful information." SSO refers to non-literal elements of computer programs that include "data input formats, file structures, design, organization and flow of the code, screen outputs or user interfaces, and the flow and sequencing of the screens.". However, the SAS Inst. Inc. V. S&H Computer Sys. Inc. demonstrated that copyright can exist in derived works from publicly funded developed source code in the public domain rather than address the issue of SSO.

Jaslow appealed the decision. The Court of Appeals for the Third Circuit noted that computer programs are literary works under U.S. law. The court reasoned that with literary works a non-literal element is protected to the extent that it is an expression of an idea rather than the idea itself. By analogy, the purpose or function of a software work would be the work's "idea", while everything not necessary to that purpose or function would be part of the expression of the idea. The expression would be protected, although the basic purpose or function would not. On this basis the Court of Appeals upheld the district court's ruling of copyright violation due to similarity of SSO.

== Early adoption and criticism ==
For the next few years most, but not all, circuit courts accepted the Whelan decision on SSO in one form or another. This resulted in a period of tight protection for software, since almost everything other than the broad purpose of a software work would be protected. The only exception was where the functionality could only be achieved in a very small number of ways. In these cases there could be no protection due to the merger doctrine, which applies when the expression and the idea are inextricably merged.

In one case a court found that a defendant had infringed the right to prepare a derivative work when they copied the sequence, structure, and organization of the plaintiff's file formats, screen, reports, and transaction codes, even though different data fields were present. In 1986 the ruling in Broderbund Software, Inc v. Unison World, Inc appeared to prevent software developers from marketing products with the same or similar user interfaces, regardless of whether there was anything in common in the underlying code. In the 1990 case of Lotus v. Paperback the U.S. District Court for Massachusetts decided that Paperback's VP-Planner software violated the copyright of Lotus's 1-2-3 spreadsheet program since it had the same user interface, even though the underlying code was completely different.

A technical criticism of Whelan is that it fails to distinguish between the sequence in which instructions are presented in the text of a program and the sequence in which the instructions are executed - the program's behavior. Both the textual and behavioral aspects have their own SSO, but a programmer would see the textual SSO as relatively unimportant. A related point is that although the text of a computer program may be an "original work of authorship", protected by copyright laws, the algorithms and designs that the program embodies may be better considered to be "processes, procedures, systems, methods of operation", which are explicitly excluded from copyright protection although they may be protectable by patents. The distinction between the code's SSO, which is protected by copyright, and the protocol or algorithm, which is patentable, is however extremely difficult to maintain.

The Whelan ruling has been criticized as being "dangerously broad". By saying that the purpose of the program was to assist a Dental lab operation, and that anything not essential to that purpose was an expression, it left open a wide range of functions that could be deemed "not essential" and therefore subject to protection. In the 1988 Healthcare Affiliated Services, Inc. v. Lippany the court took a position more in line with the idea-expression merger concept, saying that the defendant's choice of scope, variables to be used and other aspects of what its software would do did not constitute the SSO. In 1987 the Court of Appeals for the Fifth Circuit rejected the extension of copyright protection to the non-literal elements of computer programs in the case of Plains Cotton Cooperative Ass'n v. Goodpasture Computer Serv. The court held that input formats were idea rather than expression and refused to extend protection to these formats. The court said: "We decline to embrace Whelan."

== Computer Associates v. Altai ==
In Computer Associates Int. Inc. v. Altai Inc. in 1992 the Second Circuit Court of Appeals agreed with the conclusion in Whelan that the structure, sequence and organization of a program might be protected by copyright where appropriate. However, the court went on to say, "As we have already noted, a computer program's ultimate function or purpose is the composite result of interacting subroutines. Since each Subroutine is itself a program, and thus, may be said to have its own 'idea,' Whelan's general formulation that a program's overall Purpose equates with the program's idea is descriptively inadequate."

The Second Circuit introduced the three-step Abstraction-Filtration-Comparison test, and several other circuits later adopted this test. In the abstraction step the court identifies similarities starting from the object and source code and moving up to higher levels of abstraction. In the filtration step any legitimate similarities are discarded. Elements removed in this step include obvious expressive interpretations of broad ideas, elements dictated by efficiency or external considerations, elements in the public domain and industry standards. In the comparison step the court decides whether there is enough similarity between the remaining elements to constitute infringement, and if so the severity of the infringement.

One effect of the Altai case may have been that companies that thought they were protected under Whelan, and had therefore not filed patent applications, now found themselves exposed. The Altai case may have gone too far, in effect removing protection from all but the literal elements of a program and thus leading to underprotection. Aware of this risk, many courts that followed the Altai ruling seem to have in practice performed less filtration than was required by the test. However, most circuits have accepted Altai in preference to Whelan.

== Later decisions ==
Both the code and the "look and feel" of a software product have structure, sequence and organization. Technically there is little or no connection between the two. The same look and feel can be created by entirely different software products, and two internally very similar software products may present very different look and feel. However, the courts have tried to maintain common standards and tests for both types of SSO.

Following the 1986 Broderbund ruling, Lotus Development Corporation sued two competing spreadsheet program vendors for copying the look and feel of their Lotus 1-2-3 spreadsheet program, and Apple Computer sued Microsoft and Hewlett-Packard for copying the Macintosh operating system's use of icons, pull-down menus and a mouse pointing device. Both companies drew criticism, since key elements of their look and feel had been introduced earlier by VisiCalc and Xerox. A 1992 federal court finding against Apple largely rejected the idea that copyright law could protect look and feel. The Lotus case went to the Supreme Court, which could not reach a decision, thus by default confirming the lower court's 1995 declaration that the words and commands used to manipulate the spreadsheet were a "method of operation", which is not subject to copyright.

Only patent law can protect the behavior of a computer program. Competitors may create programs that provide essentially the same functionality as a protected program as long as they do not copy the code. The trend has been for courts to say that even if there are non-literal SSO similarities, there must be proof of copying. Some relevant court decisions allow for reverse-engineering to discover ideas that are not subject to copyright within a protected program. The ideas can be implemented in a competing program as long as the developers do not copy the original expression. With a clean room design approach one team of engineers derives a functional specification from the original code, and then a second team uses that specification to design and build the new code. This was piloted in the mid-1980s by a team from Phoenix Technologies to produce a BIOS functionally equivalent to that of the IBM Personal Computer without infringing on IBM's copyright.

In August 2010 Oracle Corporation initiated a lawsuit against Google claiming a combination of patent and copyright violations related to Google's implementation of the Java programming language in Google's Android operating system. On May 7, 2012 a jury decided that Google had infringed the SSO copyright of 37 Java Application programming interface (API) packages, but were unable to decide whether this was fair use. The judge asked both Google and Oracle to provide further detail of their positions over whether an API or a programming language such as Java can be copyrighted. He also asked for both sides to comment on a ruling by the European Court of Justice in a similar case that found "Neither the functionality of a computer program nor the programming language and the format of data files used in a computer program in order to exploit certain of its functions constitute a form of expression. Accordingly, they do not enjoy copyright protection." On May 31, 2012 the judge ruled that "So long as the specific code used to implement a method is different, anyone is free under the Copyright Act to write his or her own code to carry out exactly the same function or specification of any methods used in the Java API."

In reviewing the Oracle v. Google case history, the court noted:

...the above summary of the development of the law reveals a trajectory in which enthusiasm for protection of "structure, sequence and organization" peaked in the 1980s, most notably in the Third Circuit’s Whelan decision. That phrase has not been re-used by the Ninth Circuit since Johnson Controls in 1989, a decision affirming preliminary injunction. Since then, the trend of the copyright decisions has been more cautious. This trend has been driven by fidelity to Section 102(b) and recognition of the danger of conferring a monopoly by copyright over what Congress expressly warned should be conferred only by patent. This is not to say that infringement of the structure, sequence and organization is a dead letter. To the contrary, it is not a dead letter. It is to say that the Whelan approach has given way to the Computer Associates approach, including in our own circuit. See Sega Enters., Ltd. v. Accolade, Inc., 977 F.2d 1510, 1525 (9th Cir. 1992); Apple Computer, Inc. v. Microsoft Corp., 35 F.3d 1435, 1445 (9th Cir. 1994).
