= IBM System/7 =

Minicomputer sold by IBM

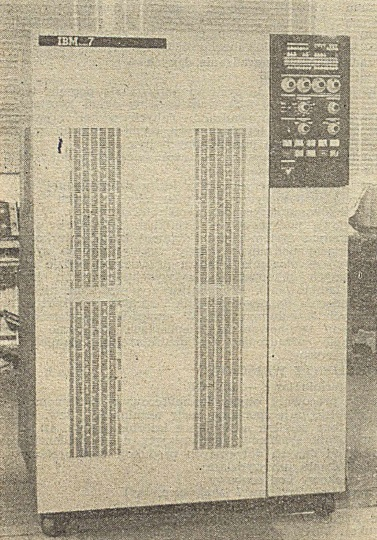

The IBM System/7 was a computer system designed for industrial control, announced on October 28, 1970 and first shipped in 1971. It was a 16-bit machine and one of the first made by IBM to use novel semiconductor memory, instead of magnetic core memory conventional at that date.

IBM had earlier products in industrial control market, notably the IBM 1800 which appeared in 1964. However, there was minimal resemblance in architecture or software between the 1800 series and the System/7.

System/7 was designed and assembled in Boca Raton, Florida.

Competitors in process control to the System/7 at the time of launch included:

- Raytheon 706
- Varian 520/i
- GE GE-PAC 30-1
- DEC PDP-11/20

== Hardware architecture ==
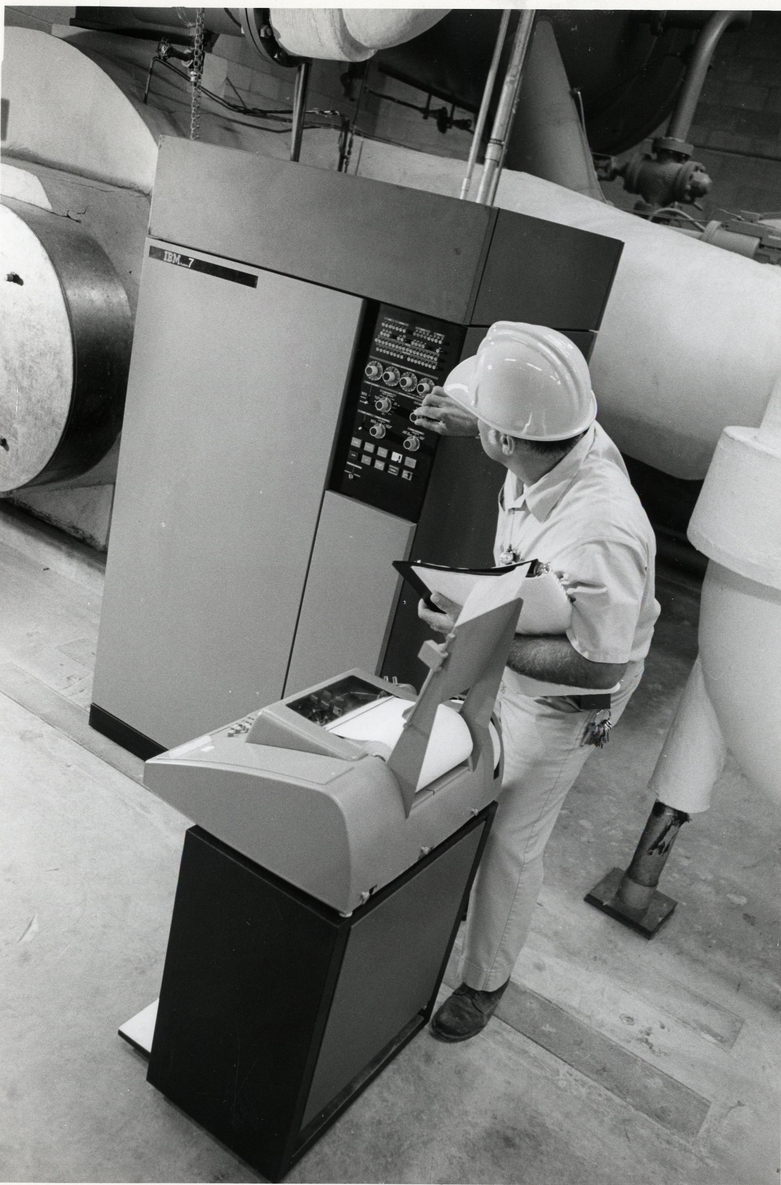
IBM System/7 in use

The processor designation for the system was IBM 5010. There were eight registers which were mostly general purpose (capable of being used equally in instructions) although R0 had some extra capabilities for indexed memory access or system I/O. Later models may have been faster, but the versions existing in 1973 had register to register operation times of 400 ns, memory read operations at 800 ns, memory write operations at 1.2 μs, and direct IO operations were generally 2.2 μs. The instruction set would be familiar to a modern RISC programmer, with the emphasis on register operations and few memory operations or fancy addressing modes. For example, the multiply and divide instructions were done in software and needed to be specifically built into the operating system to be used.

The machine was physically compact for its day, designed around chassis/gate configurations shared with other IBM machines such as the 3705 communications controller, and a typical configuration would take up one or two racks about 5 feet (1.5 m) high, the smallest System/7s were only about 3 feet (0.91 m) high. The usual console device was a Teletype Model 33 ASR (designated as the IBM 5028), which was also how the machine would generally read its boot loader sequence. Since the semiconductor memory emptied when it lost power (in those days, losing memory when you switched off the power was regarded as a novelty) and the S/7 did not have ROM, the machine had minimal capabilities at startup. It typically would read a tiny bootloader from the teletype, and then that program would in turn read in the full program from another computer or from a high speed paper tape reader, or from an RPQ interface to a tape cassette player. Although many of the external devices used on the system used the ASCII character set, the internal operation of the system used the EBCDIC character set which IBM used on most systems.

=== Specialization ===
There were various specializations for process control. The CPU had four banks of registers each of different priority and it could respond to interrupts within one instruction cycle by switching to the higher priority set. Many specialized I/O devices could be configured for things such as analog measurement or signal generation, solid state or relay switching, or TTL digital input and output lines. The machine could be installed in an industrial environment without air conditioning, although there were feature codes available for safe operation in extreme environments.

=== Standard hardware units ===
A System/7 is typically a combination of the following:

- IBM 5010: Processing Module. This module is always present in a System/7. Effectively this is the controller for the System/7, performing arithmetic and logical functions as well as providing control functions.
- IBM 5012: Multifunction Module. This module handles both digital and analog I/O. It can also be used to control an IBM 2790.
- IBM 5013: Digital Input/Output Module. This module handles digital I/O as well as the attachment for custom products. It can also be used to control an IBM 2790.
- IBM 5014: Analog Input Module. This module could take voltage signals and turn them into data inputs.
- IBM 5022: Disk Storage Unit. Announced in 1971, it could hold either 1.23 million or 2.46 million 16-bit words.
- IBM 5025: Enclosure. This is effectively the rack into which the power supplies and I/O modules are installed.
- IBM 5028: Operator Station. This is a stand-alone station that includes a keyboard and a printer. It also includes a paper tape punch and a paper tape reader. In the photo captioned IBM System/7 in use, it is to the left of the operator in the foreground of the photo. When first announced in 1970, one Operator Station was mandatory for each System/7, but in 1971 IBM announced that one 5028 could be shared by several System/7s.

== Software ==
The operating system would more properly be called a monitor. IBM provided a wide variety of subroutines, mostly written in assembler, that could be configured into a minimum set to support the peripherals and the application. The application-specific code was then written on top of the monitor stack. A minimal useful configuration would run with 8 kilobytes of memory, though in practice the size of the monitor and application program was usually 12kB and upwards. The maximum configuration had 64kB of memory. The advanced (for the time) semiconductor memory made the machine fast but also expensive, so a lot of work went into minimizing the typical memory footprint of an application before deployment. The development tools normally ran on IBM's 360 computer system and the program image was then downloaded to a System/7 in a development lab by serial link. Up until 1975 at least it was rare to use disk overlays for the programs, with no support for that in the software tools. Hard disks, in the IBM Dolphin line of sealed cartridges, were available but expensive and were generally used as file systems storing data and executable programs (thereby eliminating the need to rely on the paper tape reader for system boot-up).

Most work was done in a macro assembly language, with a fairly powerful macro language facility allowing great flexibility in code configuration and generation. Static variable binding, like Fortran, was the norm and the use of arbitrary subroutine call patterns was rare. The machines were usually deployed for very fixed jobs with a rigidly planned set of software. This often extended to the real-time interrupt latency, using the four levels of priority and the carefully crafted software paths to ensure guaranteed latencies. Fortran and a PL/1 subset (PL/7) compilers were available no later than 1976 as larger configurations became more affordable and more complex data processing was required. System/7 programmers still needed to be aware of the actual instructions that were available for use.

Much development work was done on S/360 or S/370 using a variation of the HLASM program geared to the MSP/7 macro language. To provide more flexibility in programming the System/7, a group in the IBM San Jose Research Laboratory in San Jose, California developed the LABS/7 operating environment, which with its language Event Driven Language (EDL), was ported to the Series/1 environment as the very successful Event Driven Executive (EDX).

== Uses ==
The System/7 was designed to address the needs of specific "real-time" markets which required collecting and reacting to input and output (I/O) from analog devices (e.g. temperature sensors, industrial control devices). This was a very limited market at the time. Specific commercial uses included factory control systems and air conditioning energy control systems. AT&T was also a large customer. However, the main use may have been for, what were at the time, classified military uses.

In January 1975 IBM reported that nearly 2,500 System/7s had been installed.

=== Example customers ===
This is an eclectic list of customers intended to show the variety of use cases for which the System/7 could be employed:

- In 1971 IBM claimed their first customer delivery of a System/7, made to American Motors Corporation (AMC) in Kenosha, WA. The system was delivered on September 16, 1971, and installed 24 hours later. It was the first of two that were to be used to measure the emissions of new production automobiles.
- In 1972 it was reported that the University of Pennsylvania was using remote terminals with card readers, attached to an IBM System/7, to reduce the incidence of meal contract abuse among 2000 students. It helped ensure students did not exceed their meal limits or eat meals in multiple dining rooms in the same meal period.
- In 1978 it was reported that Pfizer Corporation was using a System/7 equipped with audio-response to allow around 1,300 sales representatives to remotely enter orders through a mini-terminal that could send touch-tone signals via a telephone. They called the system "Joanne".
- In 1979 Exxon expanded their Antwerp refinery — upgrading it from 90,000 to 240,000 barrels per day in a $280 million project. They used an IBM System/7 to control and process customer orders, checking each order against the refinery's inventory from the moment it was received through to delivery, 24 hours per day. Implementing the solution required 750,000 programming instructions and was described by IBM Belgium's Robert Van Elegem as: "a project unique in the world" that had to "develop a solution which had never yet even been tried anywhere else"(sic).

==== Power management ====
An edition of IBM Think Magazine published in 1976 made the claim that more than 500 of their customers were using a System/7 for power management during what was then described as an energy crisis. Some of the example customers they cited are below (but note these examples were supplied by IBM and could be considered marketing material):

- Paramus Park Shopping Center a 275,000-square-foot shopping mall in northern New Jersey used a System/7 using 18 control points to regulate 139 heating and air-conditioning units. The system was designed to maintain comfortable temperatures for shoppers and tenants while conserving energy. It did this by turning selected equipment off for short periods. In the billing period that ended 14 August 1976, the centre reported their electricity consumption was 571,200 kilowatt hours lower than the equivalent period prior to the installation, representing a saving of roughly US$10,000.
- Clark University in Worcester, Massachusetts deployed a System/7 in June 1975 to automate climate management across its campus buildings. Rooftop sensors fed were used to feed temperature data to the computer, which then controlled thermostats on individual floors and staggered heating cycles in 15-minute intervals so that only a portion of the campus drew heat at any given time. In the first full year of use, total energy use across the campus dropped from 136.5 billion to 124.4 billion BTU, saving US$25,000 and marking the first year since 1972 in which the university's overall energy expenditure had fallen.
- Lebanon Steel Foundry a foundry in central Pennsylvania installed a System/7 in August 1973 to regulate power consumption across its two electric arc furnaces, each of which used approximately 550 kilowatt hours per ton of scrap metal that it melted. The computer replaced a rudimentary demand-limiting device that had been in use since 1963. The new system could predict upcoming peak loads and curtail furnace power for periods as brief as 15 seconds, a time short enough to avoid disrupting steel production. At time of writing the system was being expanded to manage ventilation equipment, dust extraction, and four smaller induction furnaces at the facility.
- Field Enterprises the publisher of the Chicago Sun-Times and Chicago Daily News installed a System/7 to manage heating, cooling, and industrial processes in its nine-storey, 500,000-square-foot production building. More than 100 devices, from ventilation fans to the zinc melting pots used in preparing press plates, were placed under computer control. Ventilation fans could be shut down for up to nine minutes per cycle, and the zinc pots which were held at 580 °F could be temporarily idled, all without impacting the newspaper's production schedules. The article claimed the system delivered savings close to US$83,000 in its first year of operation.
- Riceland Foods a rice and soybean cooperative in Stuttgart Alabama, which at that time shipped product from New Orleans and Mobile to over 100 countries, installed a System/7 at its Stuttgart (USA) soybean division to manage 150 of the plant's 1,500 electric motors. The computer shut individual motors down for brief periods in a rotation that kept processing lines running normally, cutting electricity costs by roughly eight per cent and saving more than US$6,000 monthly. A second unit was later deployed at a comparable facility in Helena, 75 miles away, where it also governed the agitators, blowers and aerators they used in soybean processing.

==== Safety concerns ====
The System/7s use in various industrial locations generated concerns about employee safety. An article on safety measures at IBM in their November 1975 Think magazine, described a customer who wanted to place data collection terminals into a foundry location where the ambient temperature was 125 F and there was constant hammering noise. IBM had to persuade the customer to locate the terminals in a safer location and provide a locker where IBM employees could change into customer-supplied fire-retarding and chemical-resistant overalls. IBM also had to commit to supplying its employees with hard hats, hearing protection and safety glasses.

=== Maritime Application/Bridge System ===
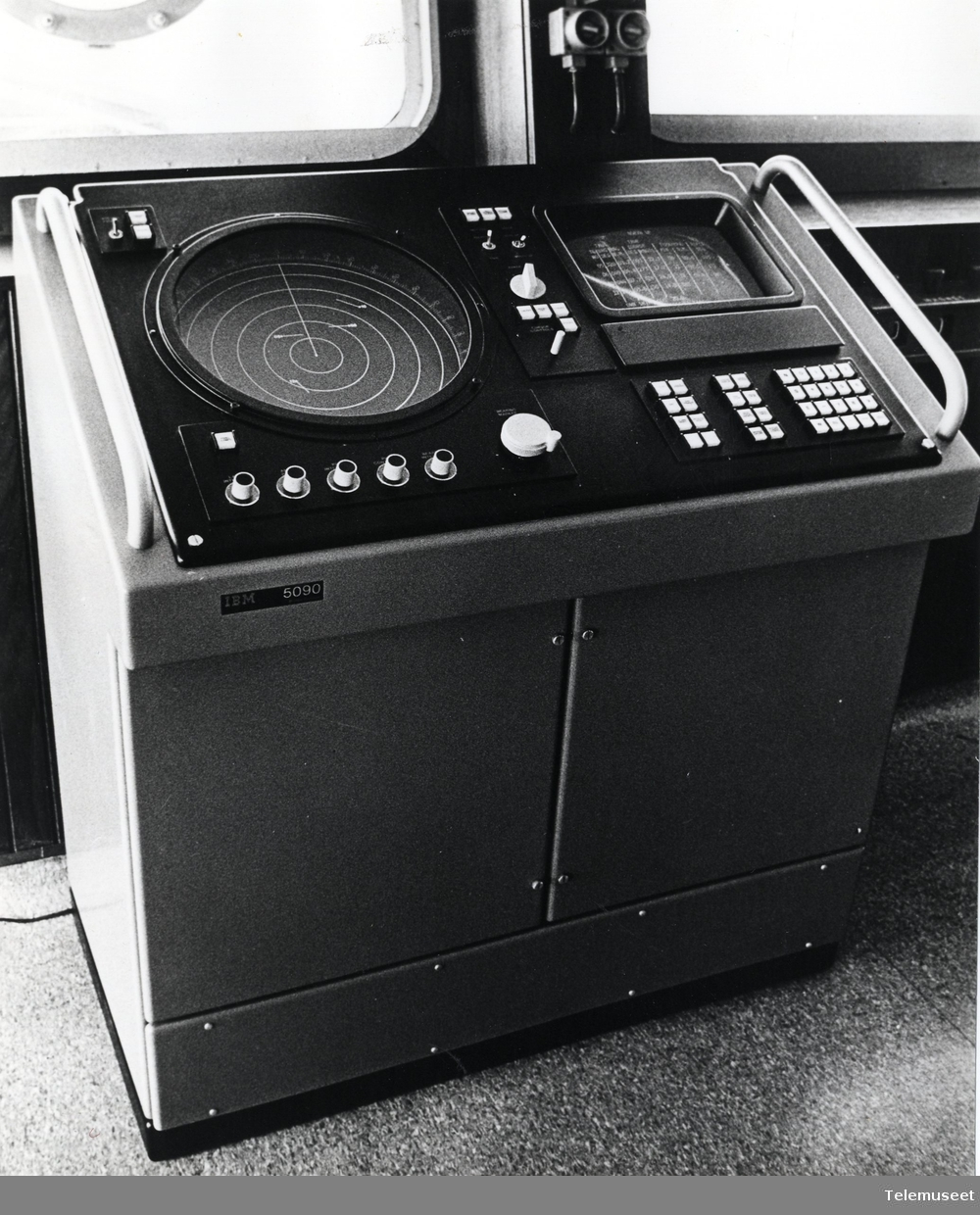
IBM 5090: N02 Bridge Console

The System/7 Maritime Application/Bridge System is designed to make the navigation of large ships safer and more efficient, by reducing the amount of data that bridge personnel needed to correlate while improving how it is presented. IBM announced this system on October 15, 1973 and by the end of 1979 over 100 vessels were using it.

It provides five programmed functions:

- Collision assessment: This uses the ship's radar as well as speed log and gyrocompass to determine where collision risks exist in up to a 16.5 nautical mile radius.
- Position fixing: This uses various inputs including satellite navigation receiver, Decca Navigator, gyrocompass and the ship's speed log to show the ship's position.
- Adaptive autopilot: This constantly adapts the ship's steering in response to sea conditions
- Route planning: This allows forecasting for navigational changes, based on the ship's current position and then either the inputted destination or the next turning point. Routes could be stored and retrieved.
- Route tracking: This uses boundaries input by the navigator and position-fixing data. It then uses the PPI to display channels or lanes. It could sound an alarm if a boundary was being approached.

This solution was the first navigational aid that the Control Engineering Department of Lloyds Register added to their list of Approved Control and Electrical Equipment.

==== System/7 Maritime Application/Bridge System hardware ====
It consists of the following hardware:

- 5010E Processing Module. This module is always present.
- 5022 Disk Storage Unit.
- 5026 C03 Enclosure. This has been modified to handle extended heavy vibrations and tilting
- 5028 Operator Station.
- 5090: N01 Radar Navigation Interface Module (RNIM). Interfaces with OEM equipment such as radar, gyros, navigation equipment.
- 5090: N02 Bridge Console. This provides a radar plan position indicator (PPI) that allows the navigator to communicate with and control the system.

There are also RPQs to ruggedize the hardware, provide interfaces to various navigation equipment and provide spares for on board ship.

==== Sudden withdrawal ====
In the late 1970s IBM Chairman Frank Cary made the decision to not only withdraw the maritime system but remove it from the ships that were equipped with it. This was done due to legal and reputational concerns about what would happen if a ship equipped with the system was involved in a major incident. All clients were compensated for the removal.

== Withdrawal ==
The System/7 product line was withdrawn from marketing on June 20, 1984. IBM's subsequent product in industrial control was the Series/1, also designed at Boca Raton.
