= Broderbund Software Inc. v. Unison World, Inc. =

Broderbund v. Unison
- Court: United States District Court for the Northern District of California
- Full case name: Broderbund Software Inc v Unison World, Inc
- Decided: October 8, 1986
- Citation: 648 F. Supp. 1127, 1133 (N.D. Cal. 1986)

Court membership
- Judge sitting: William Horsley Orrick, Jr.

Case opinions
- Defendant adjudged to have infringed the copyright of plaintiff on the audiovisual displays of the computer program.

Keywords
- copyright infringement, non-literal elements, substantial similarity

Broderbund Software Inc. v. Unison World, Inc., 648 F. Supp. 1127, 1133 (N.D. Cal. 1986), was a United States District Court for the Northern District of California software case, initially important in determining how U.S. copyright law applied to the look and feel presented by a software product. It took an expansive position which later courts increasingly rejected.

== Background ==
Broderbund Software developed The Print Shop, a program to produce signs and greeting cards, running on Apple II computers. Broderbund started discussions with Unison World about creating a version that would run on IBM PC compatibles. The two companies could not agree on a contract, but Unison World went ahead and developed PrintMaster, an IBM PC product with similar function and a similar user interface. Broderbund sued for infringement of their copyright. Claude M. Stern, then an associate with Horwich & Warner LLP, represented Broderbund.

In defense, Unison invoked the merger doctrine, arguing that the idea behind the user interface could not be separated from its expression, so could not be protected by copyright.

== Decision ==
The court referred to Whelan v. Jaslow, which had earlier that year established the principle that the structure, sequence and organization of a computer program could be subject to copyright (software copyright).

Whelan had declared that, "the purpose or function of a utilitarian work would be the work's idea, and everything that is not necessary to that purpose or function would be part of the expression of the idea ... Where there are various means of achieving the desired purpose, then the particular means chosen is not necessary to the purpose; hence, there is expression, not idea."

The court rejected "defendant's argument that the overall structure, sequencing, and arrangement of screens in [the program] fall outside the ambit of copyright protection." The court introduced the idea of the "total concept and feel" of a software work.

The court said, "the idea of 'Print Shop' is the creation of greeting cards, banners, posters and signs that contain infinitely variable combinations of text, graphics and borders. A rival software publisher is completely free to market a program with the same underlying idea, but it must express the idea through a substantially different structure."

The display was held copyrightable since it contained "aesthetically pleasing artwork, an entertaining layout and display, and a high degree of stylistic creativity."

This case found that copyright registration of a computer program implicitly covers registration of screen displays.

== Consequences ==
According to one author, "the Broderbund court has paved the way for a new and unanticipated application of Whelan. Under Broderbund, software designers will not be able to market programs which use the same, or a substantially similar, user interface ... [T]he ... decision extended copyright protection to a program's menu screens 'without regard for the lack of similarity in the underlying code'". In Digital Communications Associates v. Softklone (1987) the court rejected Broderbund, holding that showing screen replication was not sufficient. The plaintiff had to show that the source or object code had substantial similarities. The Copyright Office refused to register copyright in the textual display screens of the Lotus 1-2-3 spreadsheet software in 1987. On 8 June 1988 the Copyright Office issued a Notice of Decision, summarized as:

... all copyrightable expression owned by the same claimant and embodied in a computer program, or first published as a unit with a computer program, including computer screen displays, is considered a single work and should be registered on a single application form. The notice also confirms the applicability of 37 CFR §202.3(b)(3) concerning registration of all copyrightable expression in a unit of publication and of 37 CFR §202.3(b)(6) concerning one registration per work.

Other courts, such as the District Court of Connecticut in Manufacturers Technologies, Inc. v. CAMS Inc. (1989), found that the Broderbund approach was too expansive. That court decided that the software and the user interface were distinct, although could each contain copyrightable material, so the program accomplished "two interrelated yet distinct registrations." The court decided to review each screen, determine whether it contained expression that could be separated from the purpose or idea underlying the screen, and if so determine whether that expression had been copied. Taking this more detailed approach, the court found that some aspects such as the method of formatting a screen or of navigating within a screen were not subject to copyright, but other aspects of the screen appearance were copyrightable expression.
