= Treloar Copyright Bill =

The Treloar Copyright Bill was a revision of the United States copyright laws introduced February 13, 1896, in the first session of the 54th United States Congress as House of Representatives (H.R.) 5976 by Missouri 9th District Representative William M. Treloar. The bill was then extensively revised, and was later reintroduced as H.R. 8211.

The bill incorporated two other pending bills (which were ultimately passed on their own) to create a Register of Copyrights (called a "commissioner" in the Treloar Bill), and to expand protections for public performance of copyrighted works, including music, for the first time. The bill would have also extended the term of copyright by 22 years, from 24 years and a 14-year extension (38 years) to 40 years and a 20-year extension (60 years). The law would have extended the manufacturing clause of the 1891 International Copyright Act to include most items excluded in 1891, including music, maps, etc.

The bill was extensively criticized in the press, especially for extending the manufacturing clause, and was strongly opposed by copyright leagues formed by authors and publishers. The bill was the subject of extensive lobbying efforts from both supporters and opponents. Although it didn't make it out of the Committee on Patents, some of its provisions did later pass.

== See also ==
- International copyright

== Sources ==
- Rosen, Zvi S., "The Twilight of the Opera Pirates: A Prehistory of the Right of Public Performance for Musical Compositions". Cardozo Arts & Entertainment Law Journal, Vol. 24, 2007. Available at SSRN: http://ssrn.com/abstract=963540. (The third section deals with the entire history of the bill).
