= PrintMaster =

- Developer: Encore, Inc.
- Initial release: March 1985
- Stable release: 2.0 / 2009
- Written in: Windows, Mac OS X
- Operating system: Windows, Mac OS X
- License: Proprietary software

PrintMaster is a greeting card and banner creation program for Commodore 64, Amiga, Apple II and IBM PC computers. PrintMaster sold more than two million copies.

== History ==
In 1986, the first version of PrintMaster was the target of a lawsuit by Broderbund, who alleged that PrintMaster was a direct copy of their popular The Print Shop program. In Broderbund Software Inc. v. Unison World, Inc., the court found in favor of Broderbund, locating specific instances of copying. The program was re-worked to provide the same functionality, but through a different look and feel.

Since the early 1990s, the name has been used for a basic desktop publishing software package, under the Broderbund brand. It was unique in that it provided libraries of clip-art and templates through a simple interface to build signs, greeting cards, posters and banners with household dot-matrix printers. Over the years, it was updated to accommodate changing file formats and printer technologies, including CD and DVD labels and inserts and photobook pages. PrintMaster is available in Platinum and Gold variants.

PrintMaster 2.0 is the first consumer desktop publishing solution at retail to offer Macintosh and Windows compatibility and integrated professional printing.

In September 2010, PrintMaster 2011 was released. Versions include Platinum, Gold, and Express for digital download.

PrintMaster project types include banners, calendars, crafts, greeting cards, invitations, labels, signs, and scrapbook pages.
