= Synth Look and Feel =

Skinnable Java look and feel

Synth is a skinnable Java look and feel, which is configured with an XML property file.

According to Sun Microsystems, goals for synth were:

- Enable to create custom look without writing any code.
- Allow appearance to be configured from images.
- Provide the ability to customize the look of a component based on its named properties.
- Provide a centralized point for overriding the look of all components.
- Enable custom rendering based on images, or user-defined javax.swing.plaf.synth.SynthPainters.

== History ==
Synth is available beginning with version J2SE 5.0 of Java (see Java version history).

Java SE 6 Update 10 release and newer contain Nimbus, a cross-platform Look and Feel implemented with Synth. However, for backwards compatibility, Metal is still the default Swing look and feel.

== Architecture ==
Synth is a skinnable look and feel in which all painting is delegated to the components, without having to write any code (see javax.swing.plaf.synth).

However synth does not provide a default look, and components that are not defined in the synth XML file will not be painted. It is however possible to assign a default style to all other widgets, and customize styles for some specific widgets only.

== Example ==
The following XML declaration defines a style named textfield and binds it to all text fields. The defaultStyle allows to set a default font, foreground and background colors to all other widgets.

 <synth>
  <style id="defaultStyle">
    <font name="Verdana" size="16"/>
    <state>
      <color value="WHITE" type="BACKGROUND"/>
      <color value="BLACK" type="FOREGROUND"/>
    </state>
  </style>
  <bind style="defaultStyle" type="region" key=".*"/>
  <style id="textfield">
    <state>
      <color value="yellow" type="BACKGROUND"/>
    </state>
    <imagePainter method="textFieldBorder" path="textfieldborder.png"
                  sourceInsets="5 6 6 7" paintCenter="false"/>
    <insets top="5" left="6" bottom="6" right="7"/>
  </style>
  <bind style="textfield" type="region" key="TextField"/>
 </synth>

Supposing that the XML declaration is defined in a file named synthExample.xml, the following code loads the XML definition file and sets the current look and feel to synth (loading a synth Look and Feel is done using the void load(URL url); method of the javax.swing.plaf.synth.SynthLookAndFeel class:

import java.io.File;
import javax.swing.UIManager;
import javax.swing.plaf.synth.SynthLookAndFeel

SynthLookAndFeel laf = new SynthLookAndFeel();
// use File.toURI().toURL(), and not File.toURL() which is deprecated
laf.load(new File("synthExample.xml").toURI().toURL());
UIManager.setLookAndFeel(laf);

== See also ==
- Swing, the standard cross-platform widget toolkit for Java
- Pluggable look and feel
