= IBM 3101 =

ASCII-based IBM computer terminal introduced in 1979

The IBM 3101 ASCII Display Station, and IBM's subsequent products, the 3151/315X and 3161/316X, are display terminals with asynchronous serial communication (start-stop signaling) that were used with a variety of IBM and non-IBM computers during the 1980s–90s, especially the data processing terminals on non-IBM minicomputers, IBM Series/1 and IBM AIX computers.

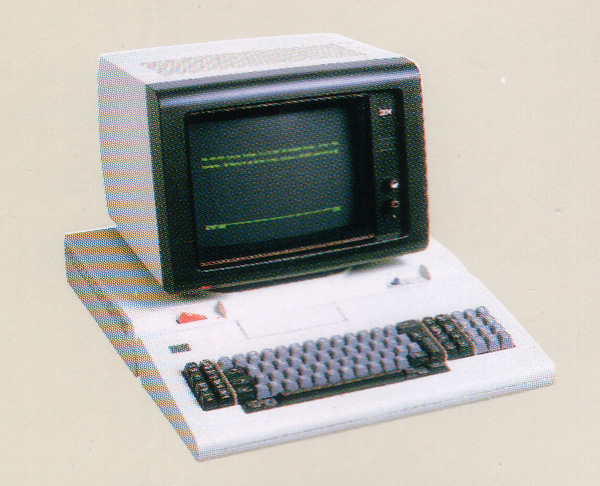
IBM 3101 Display Station

== Models ==
=== IBM 3101 ===
The IBM 3101 ASCII Display Station appeared in 1979. It featured:

- 12-inch green-phosphor CRT display
- 24 lines of 80 characters
- ASCII Keyboard (US English, Belgian, Danish, Finnish, French, German, Italian, Japanese Katakana, Norwegian, Portuguese, Spanish, Swedish, Swiss French, Swiss German, UK English)
- Asynchronous communication: EIA RS-232C interface for short distance; EIA RS-422 interface for longer distance
- Baud rates of 200/300 to 19,200 (bps)

Unusually for IBM's practices at the time, it also:

- Utilized various non-IBM technologies
- Required initial setup by the user
- Consisted of various types of displays, keyboards and logic
- Was serviced at IBM service depots only
- Allowed user-performed diagnostics, via the Problem Determination Guide booklet stored in the keyboard
- Could be purchased (with volume discounts) but not leased

The IBM 3101 was used with a variety of IBM and non-IBM computers. As an asynchronous communication display, it competed with products from Digital Equipment Corporation (e.g. VT100), Wyse Technology (e.g. 50/60/70), Applied Digital Data Systems (e.g. ADDS Viewpoint) and others. It was often used as a data processing terminal on non-IBM minicomputers and the IBM Series/1.

==== IBM 3102 printer ====
The IBM 3102 dot-matrix printer used thermal-paper print technology, and could be attached to the IBM 3101's auxiliary port. It supported 80 5x7 dot-matrix characters per line, 6 lines per inch, and output 40 characters per second.

=== IBM 3161/3163 ===
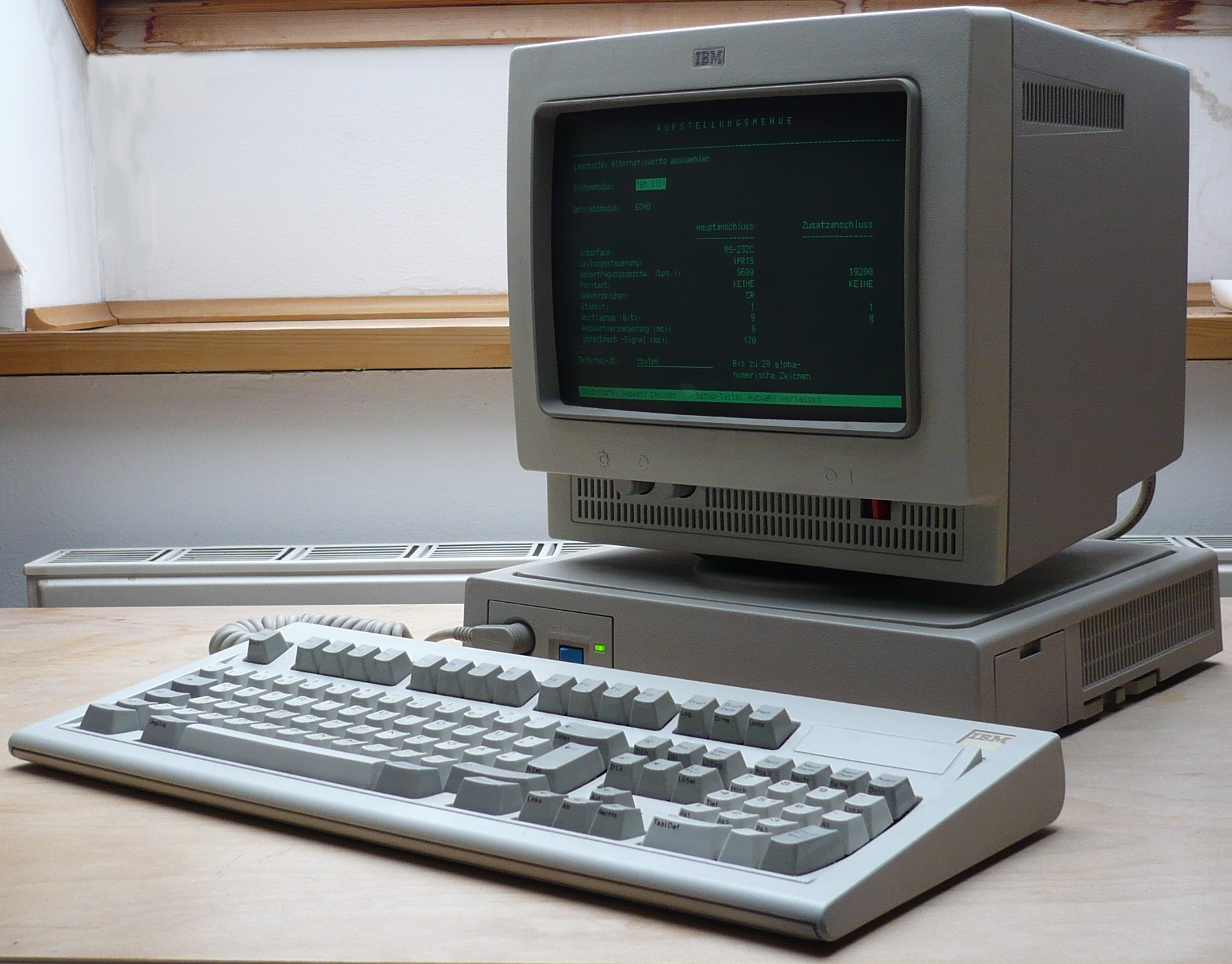
IBM 3161 terminal, displaying the German setup screen.

The IBM 3161/3163 ASCII Display Stations became available in 1985 and featured:

- Monochrome 12-inch (3161) or 14-inch (3163) CRT displays
- Optional cards to emulate other ASCII display terminals: ADDS Viewpoint, Hazeltine 1500, Lear Siegler ADM-3A and ADM 5, and TeleVideo 910

=== IBM 3164 ===
The IBM 3164 Color ASCII Display Station, available in 1986, featured a 14-inch green, amber or white monochrome CRT display.

=== IBM 3151 ===
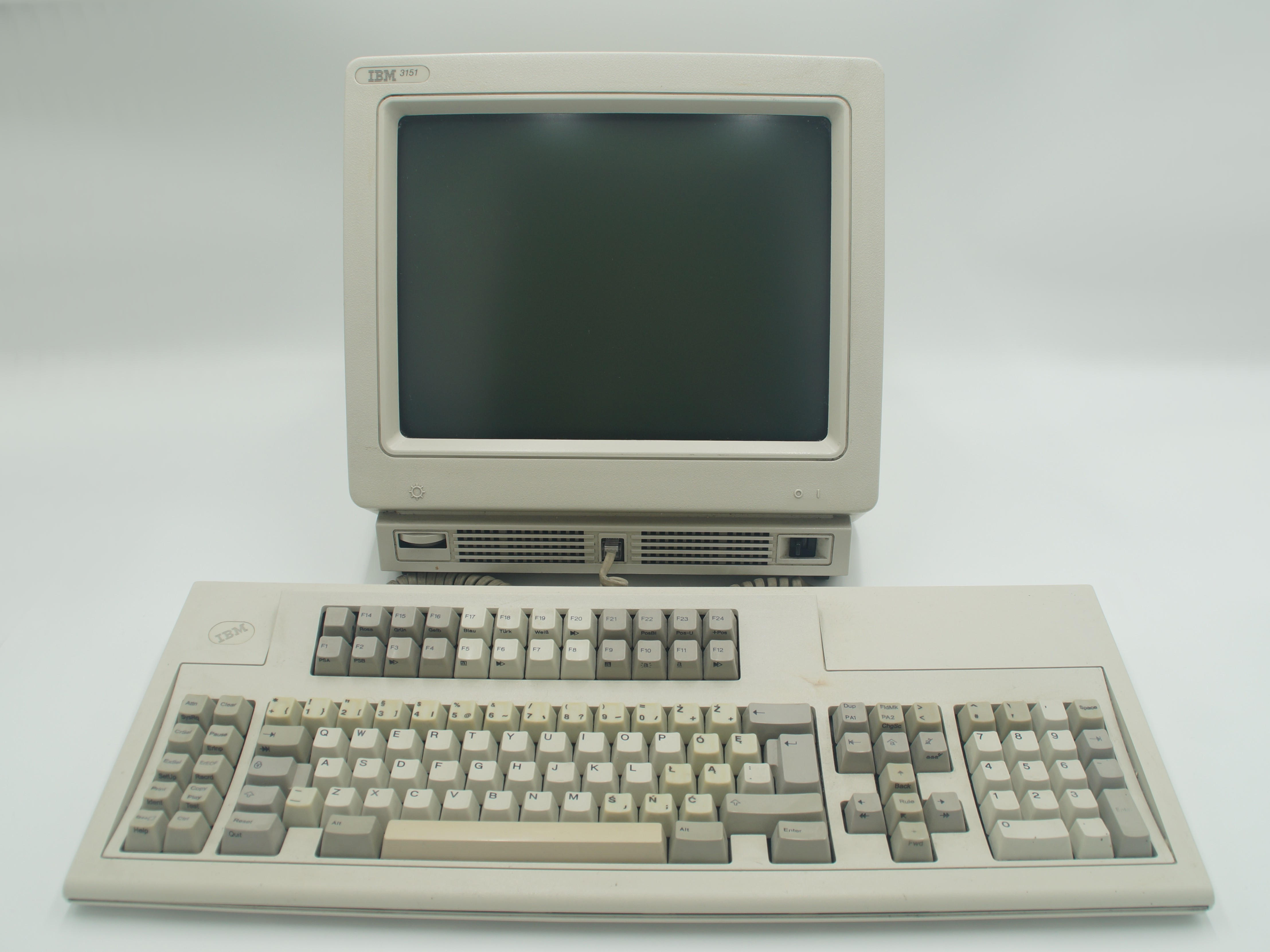
IBM 3151 with a nonstandard Polish keyboard

The IBM 3151 ASCII Display Station became available in 1987, and included:

- 14-inch diagonal green, amber or white CRT display
- 24 lines of 80-132 characters each
- Display/logic and keyboard
- Optional emulation of other Lear Siegler ADM-3A, ADM-5, ADDS Viewpoint A2, Hazeltine 1500, Televideo TVI-910/910+, TVI-912, TVI-920, TVI-925, TVI-925E, and IBM 3101 ASCII display terminals.
- ASCII block operating mode (except models 51 and 61, which were similar to the EBCDIC IBM 3270).

In 1988, the 3151 won IBM's Japan subsidiary a Good Design Product Award from the Japan Institute of Design Promotion.

=== IBM 3152 ===
The IBM 3152 Color ASCII Display Station became available in 1992 in European, Middle Eastern and African countries. It included:

- ASCII keyboard (US English, Belgian, Danish, Finnish, French, German, Italian, Greek, Norwegian, Portuguese, Spanish, Swedish, Swiss French, Swiss German, or UK English)
- PS/2 keyboard (US English, Belgian, Bosnian, Czech, Danish, Dutch, Finnish, French, German, Italian, Greek, Hungarian, Norwegian, Polish, Portuguese, Rumanian, Russian, Slovak, Slv/Croat/Sl, Spanish, Swedish, Swiss French, Swiss German, Turkish F, Turkish Q, Hebrew, or UK English)

=== IBM 3153 ===
The IBM 3153 InfoWindow II Color ASCII Display Station became available in 1993. Similarly to the NCR (Boundless Technologies) 2900 series of terminals, it could be used with cash registers and kitchen monitor systems.

== Development, manufacturing and users ==
The IBM 3101/315x/316x Series were developed by IBM's Communication Products development laboratories in Fujisawa and Yamato, Japan; then later by IBM's development department in Greenock, Scotland. They were manufactured at IBM's Research Triangle Park in North Carolina, USA, for the Americas and Asia/Pacific; and in Greenock for other countries.

They were used as data processing input/output terminals on many minicomputers—especially the IBM Series/1 and IBM AIX—for commercial, government and military applications.

== Legacy ==
The 31** series formed the basis of other several other low-cost IBM display stations, including the 3104 for the IBM 8100; the 5291 in the IBM 5250 display terminal series for the IBM System/36; the 4980 display for the IBM Series/1; and the 3178 display in the IBM 3270 display terminal series for the IBM System/370.

== See also ==
- List of IBM products
