= Ho v. Taflove =

U.S. Seventh Circuit case about the copyrightability of scientific data

- Court: United States Court of Appeals for the Seventh Circuit
- Full case name: Seng-Tiong Ho, et al. v. Allen Taflove, et al.
- Decided: June 6, 2011
- Citations: Ho v. Taflove (7th Cir. June 6, 2011), Text.

Court membership
- Judges sitting: Kenneth F. Ripple and David F. Hamilton, Circuit Judges, and G. Patrick Murphy, District Judge (opinion signed by judge Elaine E. Bucklo)

Case opinions
- The plaintiff's research materials were unprotectable ideas under copyright law's merger doctrine. Summary judgment in favor of the defendants.

Ho v. Taflove is a Seventh Circuit case about the copyrightability of scientific data. In 2011, the Seventh Circuit affirmed a 2009 decision of the United States District Court for the Northern District of Illinois holding that the expression of ideas can be copyrighted but not the ideas themselves (the idea-expression divide).

The plaintiffs alleged that the defendants violated the copyright law of the United States by publishing equations, figures, and text from research materials that the plaintiffs had produced. They also alleged that Illinois state laws were violated by publication of the materials. The district court granted summary judgment against the plaintiffs. The appeals court confirmed the judgment, concluding that the research materials were unprotectable ideas under the merger doctrine of copyright law, and that the claims of state law violations had no merit and were superseded by the Copyright Act.

== Background ==
Seng-Tiong Ho and Allen Taflove were professors of engineering at Northwestern University, where Yingyan Huang and Shi-Hui Chang were graduate students. The plaintiffs, Ho and Huang, alleged that in 1998 Ho formulated a "4-level, 2-electron atomic model with the Pauli exclusion principle for simulating the dynamics of active media in a photonic device." Within a year Ho had completed the mathematical derivations of his model, notes and equations of which were hand-written in about sixty-nine pages. With permission from Ho, Huang briefly mentioned some results from the research in a conference paper published in 2001, and published the results in full in her 2002 master's thesis.

The plaintiffs alleged that Ho gave another of his graduate students, Shi-Hui Chang, the task of creating a computer simulation of the model, giving him both access to Ho's handwritten texts and experience working with the model. Due to programming errors, Chang could not simulate the model. In 2002, Chang left Ho's research group and joined that of Taflove. In 2003 and 2004, Taflove and Chang submitted, and subsequently published, two articles directly related to the model. Some figures in Huang's master's thesis were included in these publications. The defendants did not attribute any published content to plaintiffs.

The plaintiffs alleged that when Ho attempted to publish a paper about the model in 2004, his submission was rejected on the basis that the work had already been published, i.e., the articles published by Taflove and Chang. In 2007, the plaintiffs received certificates of copyright for Ho's notes describing the model and Huang's master's thesis and a visual presentation of the thesis. The defendants, Taflove and Chang, denied many of these facts, and denied that Chang had copied from Ho or Huang.

== The case ==
On July 31, 2007, Ho and Huang filed suit in the Northern District of Illinois, Eastern Division. They alleged copyright infringement and state law claims of false designation of origin, unfair competition, conversion, fraud and misappropriation of trade secrets involving six documents published by the defendants.

=== Copyright infringement claims ===
Ho and Huang, the plaintiffs, claimed that the use of the mathematical models by Taflove and Chang, the defendants, infringed on the copyrights they held for Huang's thesis, Ho's notebooks, Huang's figures and a 2002 presentation. Their main argument was that the defendants had copied an "expression of complicated physical phenomenon" consisting of the model, derivation of equations and two figures and therefore infringed on their copyrights.

The defendants' counter argument states that the model and equations are ineligible for copyright protections under the merger doctrine because there are so few different ways to express a mathematical concept. The Copyright Act states that "in no case does copyright protection extend to any idea, procedure, process, system, method of operation, concept, principle, or discovery regardless of the form in which it is described, explained illustrated or embodied in such work" 17 U.S.C. 102(b). The plaintiffs argued that their model was not a fact and more like the cartoon character Mickey Mouse, claiming that the model was only an expression of reality like Mickey is to a mouse. However, under the copyright act and merger doctrine the plaintiffs failed to show legitimate infringement.

The district court granted summary judgement in favor of the defendants, asserting that the model was indeed an idea and therefore not eligible for copyright protection. The model is not like Mickey Mouse because it is intended to describe reality in the form of an idea but is not an expression in and of itself.

=== State law claims ===
==== False designation and unfair competition ====
The plaintiffs claimed that the publication of the model by the defendants was false designation of origin under the Lanham Act, and unfair competition because they failed to properly give credit to the plaintiffs and used it to further their own careers. The defendants argued that Dastar Corp. v. Twentieth Century Fox Film Corp. nullifies the argument. Judge Murphy agreed and asserted that under Dastar the defendants were the properly designated origin regardless of whether or not the plaintiffs had any ownership over the Model because in the Lanham Act the "origin of goods" refers to the producer of the tangible good and not the author of any idea or concept contained within or on the goods. In regards to their unfair competition claims, because their claims under the Lanham Act failed they could not receive summary judgement under unfair competition in their favor.

==== Conversion ====
A conversion claim must show the defendant's unauthorized or wrongful assumption of control and ownership of the property and the plaintiff's right in the property and to its immediate possession. Plus the plaintiff must demand for immediate possession of the property. The defendants argued that under Illinois state law their claim for conversion is not valid because it was not physical property but the plaintiffs' research ideas. The plaintiffs alleged that intangible items in a tangible medium were proper subjects of a conversion claim and because Chang & Taflove held physical copies of Ho's notebooks and Huang's thesis only reaffirmed their argument. However the court points to FMC Corp. v. Capital Cities/ABC, Inc., 915 F.2d 300, 303-04 (7th cir. 1990) which states that "the possession of copies of documents-as opposed to the documents themselves-does not amount to an interference with the owner's property sufficient to constitute conversion." Because the plaintiffs had access to the works in their idea form, by holding the notebooks Chang and Taflove did not interfere the plaintiffs' ability to use, control, access or publish their research and thus their actions do not constitute a claim for conversion under Illinois state law.

== Court decisions ==
=== District Court order ===
On April 9, 2010, the District Court ordered the plaintiffs to pay $34,869.76 in costs to Taflove and Chang. On December 20, 2010, the District Court ordered the plaintiffs to also pay $745,582 in legal fees to Taflove and Chang. The District Court, in finding that legal fees should be awarded, relied on the strength of Taflove and Chang's case, the relief awarded, and a finding that significant evidence indicated that the lawsuit brought by plaintiffs "was motivated in key part by personal animosity."

=== Court of Appeals ruling ===
On June 6, 2011, the United States Court of Appeals for the Seventh Circuit affirmed the district court's ruling on all counts except the allegation of misappropriation of trade secrets. In regard to copyright, the court of appeals stated that the plaintiffs failed to show alternative ways in which the model could be expressed. The court concluded that "these equations and figures are required by the Model ... and as such, are not subject to copyright." In regard to the state claims, the court affirmed the district court ruling that the Copyright Act preempted state law. As for misappropriation of trade secrets, the court of appeals held that this claim was not preempted by the Copyright Act but since the plaintiffs made little effort to keep their model secret their claim of misappropriation of trade secrets had no merit.
