= IBM Series/1 =

1970s era IBM minicomputer

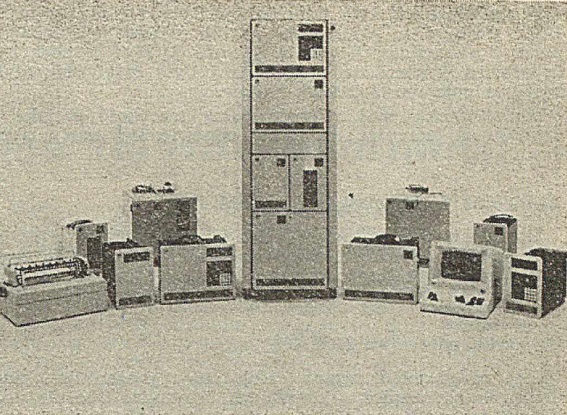
- IBM Series/1, 1978
- Manufacturer: IBM
- Type: 16-bit
- Released: November 16, 1976; 49 years ago
- Introductory price: $10,000–$100,000
- Discontinued: 1990
- CPU: @ 660–800 ns
- Memory: 16–128 KB

The IBM Series/1 is a 16-bit minicomputer, introduced in 1976, that in many respects competed with other minicomputers of the time, such as the PDP-11 from Digital Equipment Corporation and similar offerings from Data General and HP. The Series/1 was typically used to control and operate external electro-mechanical components while also allowing for primitive data storage and handling.

Although the Series/1 uses EBCDIC character encoding internally and locally attached EBCDIC terminals, ASCII-based remote terminals and devices could be attached via an I/O card with a RS-232 interface to be more compatible with competing minicomputers. IBM's own 3101 and 3151 ASCII display terminals are examples of this. This was a departure from IBM mainframes that used 3270 terminals and coaxial attachment.

Series/1 computers were withdrawn from marketing in 1990. IBM intended the follow-up computer to be, depending on the user application, the IBM PC, AS/400, or RS/6000. The challenge faced by the users was how to migrate their applications to these new systems.

A US government asset report dated May 2016 revealed that an IBM Series/1 was still being used as part of the country's nuclear command and control systems.

== Models ==
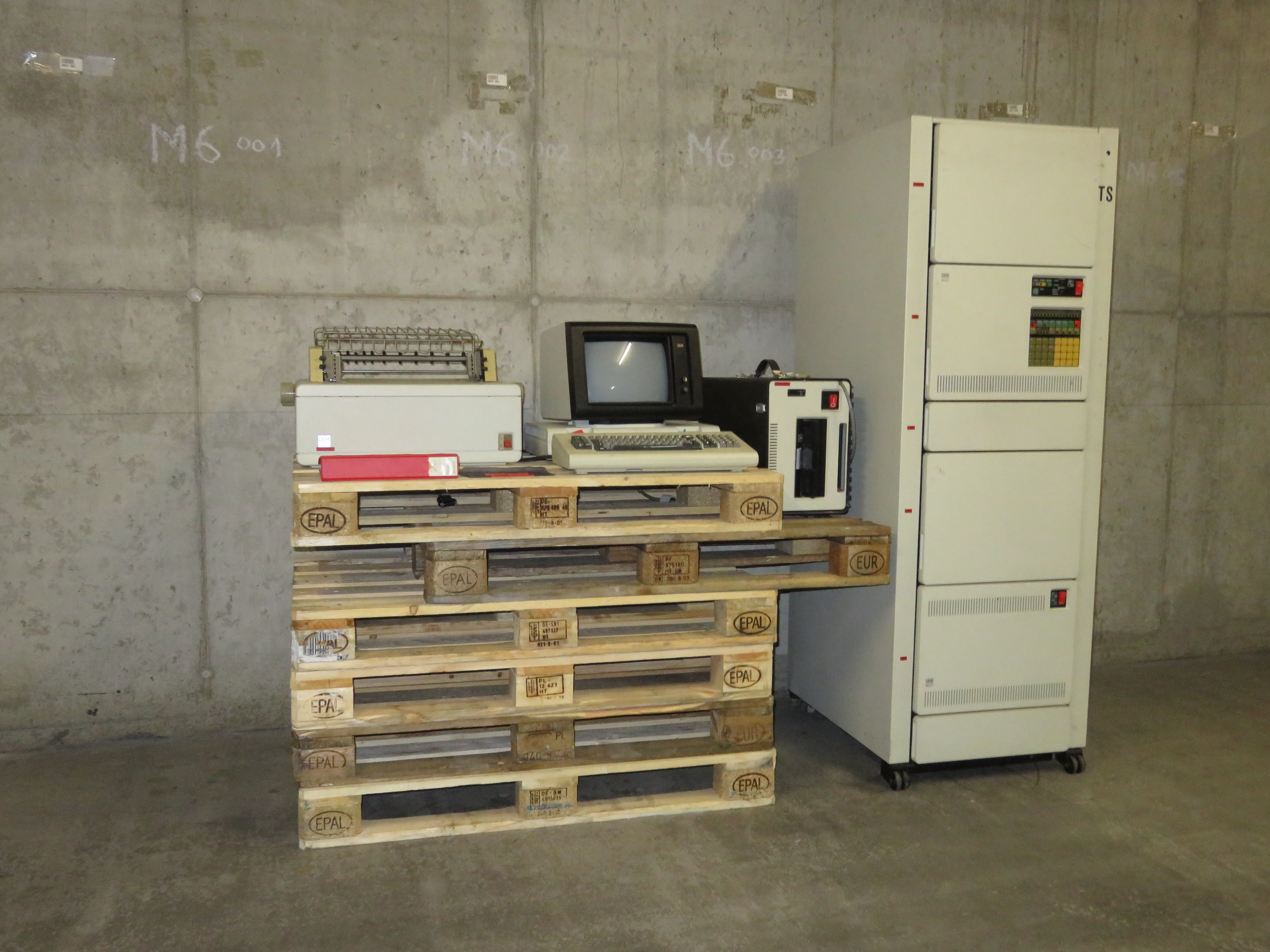
IBM Series/1 in museum; tower include 4956 processor module and 4967 module inside of IBM 4997 Rack

Initially, model 1 (4952, Model C), model 3 (IBM 4953) and model 5 (IBM 4955, Model F) processors were provided. Later processors were the model 4 (IBM 4954) and model 6 (IBM 4956). Don Estridge had been the lead manager on the IBM Series/1 minicomputer. He reportedly had fallen out of grace when that project was ill-received. He would then become the lead of the Entry Systems Division, creators of the IBM PC 5150.

== Software support ==
The Series/1 could be ordered with or without operating system. Available were either of two mutually exclusive operating systems: Event Driven Executive (EDX) or Realtime Programming System (RPS). Systems using EDX were primarily programmed using Event Driven Language (EDL), though high level languages such as FORTRAN IV, PL/I, Pascal and COBOL were also available. EDL delivered output in IBM machine code for System/3 or System/7 and for the Series/1 by an emulator. Although the Series/1 is underpowered by today's standards, a robust multi-user operating environment (RPS) was available along with several additional high level languages for the RPS OS. The EDX operating system was originally ported from the IBM 1800 Palo Alto Labs system to the System/7 and from there to the Series/1. Series/1 was also the first computer that IBM supported for Unix.

Systems without an operating system were intended for users needing dedicated applications that did not require the full capabilities of either OS. Applications were built using a set of standalone programs, called the Base Program Preparation Facilities, consisting of a macro assembler, a link editor and some basic utilities. A set of modules, called Control Program Support (CPS), was linked with the application to provide task management, data processing input/output support and initial program loading for both disks and diskettes.

== Applications of the Series/1 ==
The Series/1 was also widely used in manufacturing environments, including General Motors assembly plants. Example systems and applications included Manufacturing Information Database (MIDB), Vehicle Component Verification System (VCVS) and Assembly Line Diagnostic Link (ALDL). These systems were connected to plant floor devices and used in the realtime manufacture of vehicles. There was also a Time and Attendance (T&A) system connected to badge readers and employee turnstiles. Series/1 computers were also utilized in the early development of GM's Manufacturing Automation Protocol (MAP)

Commercial applications of customized Series/1 computers included an application by State Farm as an intelligent remote terminal in agents' offices. The processing unit was built into a desk.

The Kmart Corporation also used the Series/1 computer initially for its Kmart Information Network (KIN) which handled the store's ordering, invoicing, payroll, inventory, cash, and headquarters to store communications. A separate Series/1 computer was later added in the early phases of its POS roll-out networked with IBM 3683 registers. The Series/1 used for POS systems was short lived as it was quickly replaced by two IBM PC AT computers running either IBM 3683 or IBM 4683 registers.

The Deluxe Corporation also used a bank of Series/1 IBM 4956 computers for each check printing facility which handled the plant's business and personal check sales orders and printing operations. Various serial peripherals were attached: Printronix bar-coding printers, MICR Readers, IBM ASCII Terminals. Parallel devices were also used for phototypesetting machines, plate makers and Teletype BRPE punch creating Punched tape; all connecting to the IBM integrated DI/DO digital in/out card. The Series/1 was a good work horse for its day and was operational around the clock in an industrial environment.

Severn Trent Water Authority used a number of Series/1 computers running the RPS operating system to collect and process river telemetry outstation data. It polled each outstation every 6 hours and fed data to applications running on their ICL 2900 mainframe. Unusually, the communications link between the IBM Series/1 machines and the ICL 2900 machine used the ICL CO3 protocol rather than one of the (de facto standard) IBM communication protocols.

Shared Medical Systems (SMS Corp.) in the 1980s used the Series/1 (running EDX) as a channel-attached front-end communications processor for its IBM mainframe-based MVS/CICS hospital information system. In this environment the Series/1 provided customized interfaces to diverse (and generally non-IBM) minicomputer-based hospital systems using asynchronous or binary synchronous communications then commonly found in the laboratory, pharmacy, and other departments. Where necessary, the Series/1 also provided batch connectivity to a centralized TCAM host at SMS headquarters in Malvern, PA. Finally, the Series/1 provided a cost-effective method for remote support of the distributed mainframes using inexpensive ASCII terminals and modems, or IBM PCs equipped with light pens (emulating the 3278/9 terminals). The Series/1 was selected for this application due to challenges with MVS/VTAM and the 37x5 supporting straightforward non-SNA/SDLC communications. These Series/1 systems were connected to the mainframe using the Series/1 to System/370 channel attach module, and connected to non-IBM systems using the Feature-Programmable Multi-line Controller and Adapter.

Internally, IBM used banks of Series/1 computers as communications front end systems on their IBM Information Systems commercial network although back end processing was done with System/370 architecture computers. Also, in some IBM locations, the Series/1 was employed for building access security using ID card readers.

== Series/1 in the Marine Corps ==
The United States Marine Corps was a major Series/1 customer in the late 1970s and into the early 1980s. IBM created a ruggedized, portable version with a green plastic and metal housing for field and shipboard use known as the IBM Series I Model 4110. The central processor unit boasted twin 1 megabyte 8 inch floppy disk drives, an 8-inch green monitor with 25 × 80 character resolution (and seldom-used graphics capability) and 16 kilobytes of RAM which was upgraded to 32 kilobytes in 1984. Each standard 'suite' included the CPU unit, a keyboard, and a 132 column dot-matrix printer with a separate cooling-fan base. This suite was transported in two green, foam-lined, waterproof, locking plastic cases; each weighing over 100 pounds loaded. Among the optional pieces of equipment was a paper tape punch and a magnetic tape reader. Each of these also came with its own case.

The official nomenclature for this equipment was the 'Automated Data Processing Equipment for the Fleet Marine Force' (ADPE-FMF), but it was universally known as the 'Green Machine'.

The initial rollout of the equipment was on the west coast at Camp Pendleton in 1981, where the 1st FSSG Information Systems Management Office (ISMO) was formed to develop software and support the new equipment. ISMOs were also formed at 2nd FSSG at Camp Lejeune, 2nd MAW Cherry Point and 3rd FSSG and 1st MAW on Okinawa and were staffed with computer programmers (MOS 4063/4066) whose responsibilities included training of end users, hardware and software troubleshooting and development of local computer applications. Systems development offices were also established at Marine Corps Central Design and Programming Activities (MCCDPA) at the Marine Corps Finance Center, Kansas City, Missouri, at Marine Corps Base Quantico, and at Marine Corps Logistic Base Albany, Georgia. These offices specialized in (respectively) financial, personnel and logistical applications.

The 'Class I' systems were classified as mainframe systems – and the Series/1 systems that provided field input to them – that were maintained at and distributed from the three CDPAs. The chief among these were JUMPS/MMS (Joint Uniform Military Pay System/Manpower Management System), SASSY (Supported Activities Supply SYstem), and MIMMS (Marine Corps Integrated Maintenance Management System).

Designed primarily as a Source Data Automation (SDA) device for the enhancement of input into 'Class I' logistics and personnel computer systems, the ADPE-FMF Series/1 provided the power of a minicomputer to the battalion/squadron commander. However, left in the hands of young computer programmers from the Marine corps eager to explore the capabilities of their new equipment, the Series/1 soon proved to be a valuable tool for all manner of tasks at all organizational levels.

Dozens of 'Class II' systems were locally developed and maintained at the GSUs (General Support Units), later known as ISMOs (Information Systems Management Offices), providing undreamed-of functionality even as far as the company and deployed unit level. Systems developed included the waggishly named 'Standardized Wing Overseas Operation Passenger System' (SWOOPS – developed to generate Air Force passenger manifests from personnel databases) and 'Universal Random Integrity News Extract' (URINE – developed to provide names picked randomly from personnel databases for urinalysis screening), FLEAS (FLight Evaluation Administration System).

Although a COBOL compiler was available as part of the software package sold to the Marine Corps with the Series/1, most Class I and Class II systems development was in EDL.

In the middle 1980s, the ADPE-FMF equipment was gradually phased out in favor of IBM-PC class microcomputers running off-the-shelf software and Marine Corps developed applications written in Ada.

== As part of U.S. nuclear weapon command and control systems ==
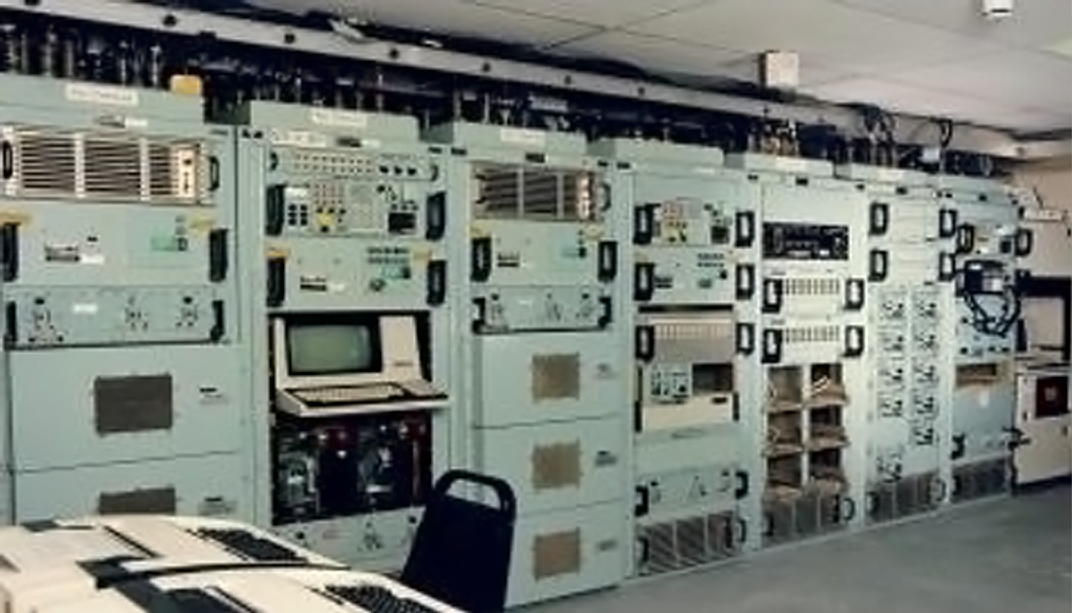
Series/1 computers used in the U.S. Air Force Strategic Automated Command and Control System as of 2016

In May 2016 the United States Government Accountability Office released a document that covered the need to upgrade or replace legacy computer systems within Federal Agencies. According to this document, the Air Force's Strategic Automated Command and Control System still uses Series/1 computer to "coordinate[...] the operational functions of the United States' nuclear forces, such as intercontinental ballistic missiles, nuclear bombers, and tanker support aircraft." This system still used 8-inch floppy disks, however the Department of Defense planned to update some of the technology by the end of the 2017 fiscal year. In June 2019, the retirement of the 8-inch floppy drives was completed, and they were replaced by a "highly secure solid state digital storage solution".
