= Idea–expression distinction =

Concept in copyright law

The idea–expression distinction or idea–expression dichotomy is a legal doctrine in copyright law that limits the scope of copyright to only the expression of manifestation of ideas, not ideas themselves. The principle is set out in article 9(2) of the TRIPS Agreement and thus followed in at least 164 countries.

Unlike patents, which may confer proprietary rights in relation to general ideas and concepts per se when construed as methods, copyrights cannot confer such rights. An adventure novel provides an illustration of the concept. Copyright may subsist in the work as a whole, in the particular story or characters involved, or in any artwork contained in the book, but generally not in the idea or genre of the story. Copyright, therefore, may not subsist in the idea of a man venturing out on a quest, but may subsist in a particular story that follows that pattern. Similarly, if the methods or processes described in a work are patentable, they may be the subject of various patent claims, which may or may not be broad enough to cover other methods or processes based on the same idea. Arthur C. Clarke, for example, sufficiently described the concept of a communications satellite (a geostationary satellite used as a telecommunications relay) in a 1945 paper that was not considered patentable in 1954 when it was developed at Bell Labs.

== Legal origins and status ==
Philosophically, there is disagreement about the distinction between thought and language. In the past it was often thought that the two could not be separated, and so a paraphrase could never exactly reproduce a thought expressed in different words. At the opposite extreme is the view that concepts and language are completely independent, so there is always a range of ways in which a concept can be expressed.

In the United States, the doctrine originated from the 1879 Supreme Court case of Baker v. Selden. The Supreme Court held in Selden that, while exclusive rights to the "useful arts" (in this case bookkeeping) described in a book might be available by patent, only the description itself was protectable by copyright. In later cases, the Supreme Court has stated that "unlike a patent, a copyright gives no exclusive right to the art disclosed; protection is given only to the expression of the idea—not the idea itself," and that "copyright's idea/expression dichotomy 'strike[s] a definitional balance between the First Amendment and the Copyright Act by permitting free communication of facts while still protecting an author's expression.'"

In the English decision of Donoghue v. Allied Newspapers Ltd. (1938) Ch 106, the court illustrated the concept by stating that "the person who has clothed the idea in form, whether by means of a picture, a play or a book" owns the copyright. In the Australian decision of Victoria Park Racing and Recreation Grounds Co. Ltd v. Taylor (1937) 58 CLR 479 at 498, Latham CJ used the analogy of reporting a person's fall from a bus: the first person to do so could not use the law of copyright to stop other people from announcing this fact.

Today, Article 1.2 of the European Union Software Directive expressly excludes from copyright ideas and principles that underlie any element of a computer program, including those that underlie its interfaces. As stated by the European Court of Justice in SAS Institute Inc. v World Programming Ltd., "to accept that the functionality of a computer program can be protected by copyright would amount to making it possible to monopolize ideas, to the detriment of technological progress and industrial development."

== Delineation ==
The idea–expression distinction has been delineated in various ways in copyright jurisprudence. One view, advanced by Stanford law professor Paul Goldstein, treats the concepts of "expression" and "idea" as metaphors for those parts of a work that are subject to copyright protection and those that are not. Thus, "idea" includes everything that is not copyrightable, especially abstract ideas, and "expression" includes all the copyrightable parts of a work, even when the work has not been copied literally.

Another view, advanced by Pamela Samuelson, draws attention to the "eight words of exclusion" in the Copyright Act of 1976:

In no case does copyright protection for an original work of authorship extend to any idea, procedure, process, system, method of operation, concept, principle, or discovery, regardless of the form in which it is described, explained, illustrated, or embodied in such work.

— 17 U.S.C. § 102(b)

Section 102(b) addresses both high-level abstractions (ideas, concepts, and principles) and "more complex, detailed, and functional information innovations" (procedures, processes, systems, methods of operation, and discoveries). According to Samuelson, the latter categories are excluded from copyright protection to prevent copyright from being used to circumvent the more stringent requirements for patent protection. In order to be covered by patents, inventions must be reviewed by a patent examiner for non-obviousness and novelty. By contrast, it is relatively easy to get copyright protection for an original work of authorship. In Baker v. Selden, the Supreme Court cautioned that granting a copyright holder a monopoly right in the useful art described in a work, "when no examination of its novelty has ever been officially made, would be a surprise and a fraud upon the public." Samuelson criticizes Goldstein's metaphor view for construing "ideas" too narrowly and distracting from the "policy reasons that support excluding more than just abstract ideas from copyright protection."

== Scènes à faire ==
Some courts have recognized that particular ideas can be expressed effectively only by using certain elements or background. There are certain archetypal characters and even types of scenes that are frequently used by authors, due to both necessity to conform to genre conventions or even because the intended audience expects such archetypes. The French name for the doctrine that protects the use of these archetypes is called Scènes à faire. Therefore, even the expression in these circumstances is unprotected, or extremely limited to verbatim copying only. This is true in the United Kingdom and most Commonwealth countries.

The term "Scenes a faire" means "obligatory scene", a scene in a play that the audience "has been permitted to foresee and to desire from the progress of the action; and such a scene can never be omitted without a consequent dissatisfaction." The term was applied to copyright law in Cain v. Universal Pictures (1942), where the United States District Court for the Southern District of California ruled that "... similarities and incidental details necessary to the environment or setting of an action are not the material of which copyrightable originality consists." The concept has been used by U.S. and U.K. courts. The term is used both in the sense of a scene that follows inevitably from a situation, or a standard scene that is always included in a particular genre of work. Another court said "Under the ... doctrine of scènes à faire, courts will not protect a copyrighted work from infringement if the expression embodied in the work necessarily flows from a commonplace idea." The concept has been extended to computer software, where some aspects may be dictated by the problem to be solved, or may be standard programming techniques.

In the United States it is recognized that certain background elements are universal or at least commonplace in some types of work. For example, in Walker v. Time Life Films, Inc., 784 F.2d 44 (2d Cir. 1986), the Second Circuit said that in a film about cops in the South Bronx it was inevitable that the scenery would include drunks, stripped cars, prostitutes, and rats. In Gates Rubber Co. v. Bando Chemical Industries, Ltd., 9 F.3d 823 (10th Cir. 1993), the Tenth Circuit held that hardware standards and mechanical specifications, software standards and compatibility requirements, computer manufacturer design standards, target industry practices and demands, and computer industry programming practices were unprotectable scènes à faire for computer programs. The principle must have a limit, however, so that something is outside the scènes à faire doctrine for South Bronx movies. In cases that "held that scenes a faire . . . are not copyrightable," outcomes were due to a "failure of the author to add anything original to the stock idea, rather than upon the impossibility of expressing the stock idea in a new form."

== Merger doctrine ==
A broader but related concept is the merger doctrine. Some ideas can be expressed intelligibly only in one or a limited number of ways. The rules of a game provide an example. For example, in Morrisey v. Procter & Gamble, 379 F.2d 675 (1st Cir. 1967), a set of rules for sweepstakes based on entrants' social security numbers was not copyrightable because there were only a limited number of ways to express the underlying idea of the sweepstakes instructions. In such cases the expression merges with the idea and is therefore not protected.

There are cases where there is very little choice about how to express some fact or idea, so a copy or close paraphrase may be unavoidable. In this case, the "merger doctrine" comes into play. The fact or idea and the expression are seen as merged, and the expression cannot be protected. The merger doctrine is typically applied only to factual information or scientific theories, not to imaginative works such as plays or novels where the author has a much broader choice of expression. The merger doctrine has been applied to the user interface design of computer software, where similarity between icons used by two different programs is acceptable if only a very limited number of icons would be recognizable by users, such as an image looking like a page to represent a document. However, in 1994 a U.K. judge in Ibcos Computers v. Barclays Mercantile Finance [FSR 275] cast doubt on the merger doctrine, saying he was not comfortable with the idea that "if there is only one way of expressing an idea that way is not the subject of copyright."

United States courts are divided on whether merger prevents copyrightability in the first place, or should instead be considered when determining if the defendant copied protected expression. Only one federal circuit, the Ninth Circuit, has specifically held that merger should be considered a "defense" to copyright infringement, but as of 2019 this is not considered an affirmative defense as the plaintiff still carries the burden of proof that infringement occurred.

== Criticism ==
A difficulty posed by the idea-expression distinction is that "[n]obody has ever been able to fix that boundary, and nobody ever can", as Judge Learned Hand wrote for the Second Circuit Court of Appeals in 1930's Nichols v. Universal Pictures Corp., holding that while a fictional character can be copyrighted, it must be well-developed. Thirty years later, Hand reiterated that point in a case that held print patterns on fabrics copyrightable: "Obviously, no principle can be stated as to when an imitator has gone beyond copying the 'idea,' and has borrowed its 'expression.' Decisions must therefore inevitably be ad hoc."

The extension of the concept to visual art has vexed later courts. In 1978, the Third Circuit heard Franklin Mint Corp. v. National Wildlife Art Exchange, where the plaintiff alleged a painter's work for the defendant was so similar to one it had previously commissioned as to be infringing. Judge Joseph F. Weis Jr. wrote:

Troublesome, too, is the fact that the same general principles are applied in claims involving plays, novels, sculpture, maps, directories of information, musical compositions, as well as artistic paintings. Isolating the idea from the expression and determining the extent of copying required for unlawful appropriation necessarily depend to some degree on whether the subject matter is words or symbols written on paper, or paint brushed onto canvas.

He also observed that under the distinction, a painter's copyright might be dependent on how stylized their work was, with a more realism-oriented artist like the one whose works were at the center of the instant case having a more difficult case for copyright infringement than the Impressionist Monet. In a case a few years later holding that the television series The Greatest American Hero did not infringe on the copyright for live-action depictions of Superman since the caped, flying superhero on the show had many significant differences, Judge Jon O. Newman of the Second Circuit commented that adaptations from a textual medium to a visual one created additional problems in resolving idea-expression questions since the former is meant to be perceived linearly while the latter is absorbed in its entirety.

In 2005, considering Mannion v. Coors Brewing Co., where a photograph was alleged to have been imitated too indistinctly, Judge Lewis A. Kaplan of the Southern District of New York recounted the earlier cases and elaborated on those difficulties:

... [I]t makes sense to speak of the idea conveyed by a literary work and to distinguish it from its expression. To take a clear example, two different authors each can describe, with very different words, the theory of special relativity. The words will be protected as expression. The theory is a set of unprotected ideas ... [But i]n the visual arts, the distinction breaks down. For one thing, it is impossible in most cases to speak of the particular "idea" captured, embodied, or conveyed by a work of art because every observer will have a different interpretation. Furthermore, it is not clear that there is any real distinction between the idea in a work of art and its expression. An artist's idea, among other things, is to depict a particular subject in a particular way. As a demonstration, a number of cases from this Circuit have observed that a photographer's "conception" of his subject is copyrightable. By "conception," the courts must mean originality in the rendition, timing, and creation of the subject—for that is what copyright protects in photography. But the word "conception" is a cousin of "concept," and both are akin to "idea." In other words, those elements of a photograph, or indeed, any work of visual art protected by copyright, could just as easily be labeled "idea" as "expression" ... [A]t what point do the similarities between two photographs become sufficiently general that there will be no infringement even though actual copying has occurred? But this question is precisely the same, although phrased in the opposite way, as one that must be addressed in all infringement cases, namely whether two works are substantially similar with respect to their protected elements. It is nonsensical to speak of one photograph being substantially similar to another in the rendition and creation of the subject but somehow not infringing because of a shared idea. Conversely, if the two photographs are not substantially similar in the rendition and creation of the subject, the distinction between idea and expression will be irrelevant because there can be no infringement. The idea/expression distinction in photography, and probably the other visual arts, thus achieves nothing beyond what other, clearer copyright principles already accomplish.

== See also ==
- Feist Publications v. Rural Telephone Service
- Ho v. Taflove
- Functionality doctrine
- Paraphrasing of copyrighted material
- Stock character
- Substantial similarity
