= Nimmer =

Nimmer may refer to

== People ==
- Melville Nimmer (1923–1985), American lawyer and expert in freedom of speech and copyright law
- Dan Nimmer (born 1982), American jazz pianist and composer
- David Nimmer, professor at the UCLA School of Law and son of Melville.
- Raymond Nimmer (1944–2018), attorney and Dean of the University of Houston Law Center

== Other ==
- Nimmer on Copyright, a 1963 copyright treatise initially written by Melville Nimmer, now revised by David Nimmer
