= Getaped.com, Inc. v. Cangemi =

U.S. legal case

Getaped, Inc. v. Cangemi
- Court: United States District Court for the Southern District of New York
- Full case name: Getaped, Inc., Plaintiff, v. Shelly Cangemi, John Shields and Ski & Cycle Hut, Defendants.
- Decided: February 28, 2002

Court membership
- Judge sitting: Alvin Hellerstein

Case opinions
- https://www.courtlistener.com/opinion/2577040/getaped-com-inc-v-cangemi/

Getaped.com, Inc. v. Cangemi is a 2002 case from the United States District Court for the Southern District of New York concerned with the issue of whether a copyrightable work made available over the internet could be considered published under the Copyright Act of 1976. Through analogy to traditional physical distribution, the court held that this indeed constituted publication.

== Background ==
The plaintiff's website, an online resource for buying mechanical scooters and the like, became available publicly on the internet in 1999. A version of the website was registered with the Copyright Office in August 2000. Beginning in the early summer of 2000, the defendants' website went live. Its content had been copied directly from the source code of Getaped.com, and offered similar services. Alleging damage to their business, Getaped filed a copyright infringement suit against the defendants. Magistrate Judge Ronald L. Ellis, calling the Getaped website an unpublished work, awarded the plaintiff a license fee of $1050.

== Opinion of the Court ==
=== Damages ===
At the district court, Judge Hellerstein reconsidered the appropriate damages to which the plaintiff was entitled. Under the Copyright Act, statutory damages can only be awarded for works registered with the Copyright Office. The copying had occurred before the website had been registered, but within the three-month grace period available for published works. Therefore, the plaintiff would only be entitled to statutory damages for the infringement if the website could be classified as a published work under the copyright act.

=== Copyright Publication ===
Under American copyright law, a work has been published once copies have been distributed to the public. Before the elimination of copyright formalities, publication without notice could result in forfeiture of an author's rights. Thus, cases considering whether or not publication had occurred focused on how many physical copies of the work had left the author's control and entered the stream of distribution. Even in reference to more intangible works, such as Martin Luther King, Jr.'s "I Have a Dream" speech, the courts paid special attention to whether physical copies of the work had been made available to the public. The court likened the fact that, once made available on the internet, anyone could have saved a copy of the website's source code to their personal computer and held that the website was indeed published.

== Subsequent Developments ==
=== Criticism ===
The opinion's reasoning on internet publication received a mixed academic reception. Melville Nimmer and David Nimmer defended the decision as a proper interpretation of the distributive definition of publication within the copyright act, and that publishing a website is the functional equivalent of a lending which would have triggered publication in the physical realm. Others have argued that making a website available is akin to a public performance or a transmission, which have traditionally not been considered publication because tangible copies were not distributed to the public. Others argued that any copying of a website's code, besides the copying necessary to view web content, would be unauthorized and thus not a publication.

=== Other Districts ===
The question of internet copyright publication arises in multiple contexts given the reliance of multiple statutes on the published or unpublished status of a work. In the international realm, the country of first publication determines whether a work can be treated as a "U.S. work" under American law. In a case brought against Nelly Furtado and Timbaland in a federal court in Florida this issue became relevant (see Timbaland plagiarism controversy). Because certain non-U.S. works are not subject to the pre-registration requirement, and a work simultaneously published in the United States can qualify as a U.S. work, the published status of the allegedly infringed work was relevant. Following the Getaped line of reasoning, the court found that the work was published, therefore a U.S. work—and because it had not been registered prior to the lawsuit's filing dismissed the case effectively imposing copyright formalities on a Berne Convention national.
