= Wainwright Securities Inc. v. Wall Street Transcript Corp. =

American legal case

Wainwright Securities v. Wall Street Transcript Corp
- Court: United States Court of Appeals for the Second Circuit
- Full case name: WAINWRIGHT SECURITIES INC., Plaintiff-Appellee, v. WALL STREET TRANSCRIPT CORPORATION and Richard A. Holman, Defendants-Appellants.
- Argued: 27 April 1977
- Decided: 15 June 1977
- Citation: 558 F.2d 91

Court membership
- Judges sitting: MEDINA, OAKES and MISHLER

Case opinions
- The essence or purpose of legitimate journalism is the reporting of objective facts or developments, not the appropriation of the form of expression used by the news source

Keywords
- copyright infringement

Wainwright Securities v. Wall Street Transcript Corp (1977) was a case in which a weekly newspaper was found to have infringed on the copyright of a publisher of reports that analyzed corporate finances, risks and opportunities. The newspaper's defense that the findings of such reports were news items was rejected, since the newspaper was found to have violated copyright through substantial similarities with the expression used in the Wainwright reports.

== Background ==
Wainwright Securities, dating back to 1868, was in the business of preparing in-depth analyses of large corporations for use by major investors such as banks, insurance companies and mutual funds. A given report may take several months to prepare, involving interviews with the company's executives and extensive research into other sources on the company and the industry as a whole. Wall Street Transcript Corp published the weekly Wall Street Transcript, providing news on business, financial and economic changes. The newspaper advertised that it provided easily digested summaries of the main research reports in its "Wall Street Roundup" section.

The newspaper began publishing summaries of the Wainwright reports in 1974. Wainwright began to formally copyright its reports, and asked the Wall Street Transcript Corp to stop copying these reports, without success. Wainwright asked the United States District Court for the Southern District of New York for an injunction and financial damages.

== District court findings ==
The district court found that there was sufficient evidence to prove irreparable injury against Wainwright, since potential customers might choose not to purchase the reports if they felt that the essential findings were available in the newspaper. The court also found that a case of copyright infringement seemed likely to succeed since the takings were substantial in quality and quantity, they probably reduced the financial value of the reports and Wall Street Transcript could have prepared their own reports from original materials rather than disseminating the Wainwright reports. The court granted a preliminary injunction, after which the case was referred to the United States Court of Appeals for the Second Circuit.

== Court of appeal findings ==
The Court of Appeal agreed with the District Court on the finding that publication of the extracts "may materially reduce the demand for Wainwright's services," sufficiently show irreparable injury. The court went on to review the alleged copyright infringement. It considered whether publication of the excerpts fell under the category of "fair use". The court defined the fair use doctrine as "a means of balancing the exclusive rights of a copyright holder with the public's interest in dissemination of information affecting areas of universal concern, such as art, science and industry". The court quoted the more vivid description given by John Schulman in 1966 as a doctrine that distinguishes between "a true scholar and a chiseler who infringes a work for personal profit." The court also considered the defendants' claim that the reports were financial news, with publication of the extracts covered under the First Amendment to the United States Constitution, which protects Freedom of the press.

The court agreed that a news event cannot by copyrighted, but pointed out that a distinction had to be made between the information about the event and the manner of expression of the person reporting the event. The latter could be copyrighted. The court quoted the finding in Reyher v. Children's Television Workshop (1976) that there is infringement in appropriating the "particular expression through similarities of treatment, details, scenes, events and characterization." It also noted that Wall Street Transcript had not, as a news reporter normally would, sought out comments on the same event from other analysts, industry experts or investors, but had simply reproduced almost verbatim the most important elements of the Wainwright report. An example of very close paraphrasing is:

- Original: And second, he says that likely to aid comparions this year was the surprisingly limited extent to which Fiber Divisions losses shrank last year
- Paraphrase: The second development likely to aid comparisons this year was the surprisingly limited extent to which the Fiber Division's losses shrank last year.

The court affirmed the district court judgement, finding that, "This was not legitimate coverage of a news event; instead it was, and there is no other way to describe it, chiseling for personal profit".

== Reactions ==
The case has been cited as an example of the principle that when the purpose of the copy is mainly financial gain, that weighs against the fair use finding. The Transcript had the intent, if not the effect, of fulfilling the demand for the original work. It is also an example of a finding that an abstract that summarizes narrow excerpts of creative expression from the original should be protected under fair use, but not if the excerpts appropriate most of the most creative and original elements.
