= See v. Durang =

- Court: United States Court of Appeals for the Ninth Circuit
- Full case name: John William SEE, Plaintiff-Appellant, v. Christopher DURANG and L.A. Stage Company, Defendants-Appellees
- Argued: 7 June 1983
- Decided: 22 July 1983
- Citation: 711 F.2d 141

Court membership
- Judges sitting: BROWNING, CHOY and FERGUSON

Case opinions
- Copying deleted or so disguised as to be unrecognizable is not copying.

Keywords
- copyright infringement

See v. Durang (1983) was a case where the author of a play claimed that another playwright had based a second play on a draft script that the plaintiff had written, infringing on its copyright. The court refused to consider the process by which the second play had been created, but chose to simply compare the end results. The court found no infringement, coining the axiom, "Copying deleted or so disguised as to be unrecognizable is not copying."

== Background ==
John William See wrote the play Fear of Acting. Christopher Durang wrote another play, The Actor's Nightmare. There is some similarity in the underlying idea of an inexperienced actor being thrust into a leading role - or in See's play into three different roles. Durang was alleged to have had access to a draft version of See's play. See complained of an infringement of his copyright in Fear of Acting to a district court.

== District court findings ==
The district court summarily dismissed the case on the basis that no reasonable person could find any substantial similarity between the two plays, apart from similarities that naturally followed from the situation and could therefore be ignored under the "scènes à faire" doctrine. The court found the two plays could not be found substantially similar in their expression of ideas. The district court refused to view the finished Fear of Acting, since it had not been alleged that the defendant copied from that version. See appealed this judgment.

== Appeals court decision ==
The United States Court of Appeals for the Ninth Circuit affirmed the judgment of the district court . The court denied that Sid & Marty Krofft Television Productions Inc. v. McDonald's Corp. said there should be no summary judgment if there is substantial similarity of ideas, and denied that summary judgment could only be granted if the similarities are "trifling". The court said summary judgment was appropriate if reasonable people would not disagree over whether or not there was substantial similarity of expression.

The appeals court examined the alleged similarities, dismissing several on the basis of "scènes à faire" and others on the grounds that they were not similar. Five remained, which the court did not consider to be enough to show substantial similarity. The court found significant differences in the treatment and mood of the two plays. The first describes the various fears of an understudy thrown into playing unfamiliar roles. The second has a dreamlike quality in which an accountant finds himself thrust into acting in a situation that seems normal to everyone but himself. The court defended the district court's decision to compare the plays "as a whole" in looking for substantial similarity, citing Sid & Marty Krofft and Roth Greeting Cards v. United Card Co.

== Results ==
The axiom "Copying deleted or so disguised as to be unrecognizable is not copying" has been quoted in various textbooks and works on copyright law. It has been quoted in other trials, such as Micro Consulting Inc. v. Zubeldia (1990) and Barbara Chase-Riboud v. DreamWorks, Inc. (1997).
