= The Actor's Nightmare =

One-act play by Christopher Durang

- Written by: Christopher Durang
- Characters: George Spelvin; Meg; Sarah Siddons; Ellen Terry; Henry Irving
- Genre: Comedy

Premiere
- Date: October 14, 1981
- Place: Playwrights Horizons; New York City

The Actor's Nightmare is a short comic play by Christopher Durang. It involves an accountant named George Spelvin, who is mistaken for an actor's understudy and forced to perform in a play for which he does not know any of the lines.

== Inspiration ==
The play was inspired by the dreams actors and performers often have in which they are about to go on stage and need help remembering their lines or rehearsal instructions. Durang himself had an actor's nightmare after performing in this play, in which he could not remember any lines and could not find his script, and when he did find the script, it was gibberish to him.

Later, the play was the subject of the legal case See v. Durang (1983), when John William See claimed that Durang had infringed his copyright in the play Fear of Acting. The district court summarily dismissed the case because no reasonable person could find any substantial similarity between the two plays, and the appeals court confirmed this decision.

== Plot ==
A man finds himself inexplicably backstage one day. When confronted by the stage manager, Meg, it becomes apparent that he is the understudy for an actor named Edwin (Edwin Booth), and as "Eddie" apparently broke both his legs, the man must perform in his stead. The man is referred to as "George" throughout the play, despite his feeling that it is not his real name (another actress refers to him as Stanley at one point as well), and he cannot remember attending any rehearsals or being an actor at all – he instead believes that he is an accountant. To make matters worse, he cannot get a straight answer about the play. An actress named Sarah tells him that it is a Noël Coward play (Private Lives), and the other actress, Ellen, tells him that it is a Samuel Beckett play called Checkmate (which seems to have elements of the plays Endgame, Happy Days and Waiting for Godot). Literally forced on stage, George attempts to improvise his lines. However, the play inconsistently shifts between scenes from Private Lives, Hamlet, Checkmate, and A Man for All Seasons. When forced to improvise a soliloquy in the Hamlet scene, George tells the audience that he was raised in a Catholic school and was interested in joining a monastery, but they told him to wait until he was older. When he was older, however, he lost faith (as he put it, "I don't know many Catholic adults"). In the final part of the play (A Man for All Seasons), George is alarmed to learn that he is to play the part of Sir Thomas More, and the execution seems too real for his liking. While attempting to convince himself that he is merely in a dream, George ends up theorizing that one cannot dream of one's death and, therefore, he will wake up just before he is beheaded. He accepts the execution but appears to be dead during the curtain call, much to the cast's confusion.

== Characters ==
- George – a man who finds himself backstage under mysterious circumstances. He appears to be an accountant and seems to be the understudy of a man named Edwin, although he cannot actually remember attending any rehearsals or being a part of the production. In Private Lives he plays Elyot. In Hamlet he plays Prince Hamlet. In Checkmate he plays Willie (who seems to be based on Nagg in Endgame). In A Man for All Seasons he plays Sir Thomas More.
- Meg – the stage manager. A capable worker. When it becomes apparent that George does not know many of his lines, she pretends to be a maid in the production and whispers some to him. In the scene from A Man for all Seasons, she plays the part of Sir Thomas More's daughter and during the execution she bids him goodbye as "George".
- Sarah – a grand actress. In Private Lives, she plays Amanda. In Hamlet, she plays Queen Gertrude. In A Man for all Seasons, she plays Sir Thomas More's wife (she also quotes Hamlet in that scene, when trying to convince George to accept the execution and bids him goodbye as "Hamlet"). Name taken from Sarah Siddons.
- Ellen – another actress, but not as grand as Sarah. For some reason, she calls George "Stanley" before the production. In Private Lives she plays Sybil. In Checkmate, her character is unnamed, but she appears to be a cross between Winnie (from Happy Days) and Nell (from Endgame). She remains in this character throughout the A Man for all Seasons scene and bids George goodbye as "Willie". Name taken from Dame Ellen Terry.
- Henry – a grand actor. In Hamlet, he plays the part of Horatio. According to the script, Henry is also able to play the part of the executioner. If this is the case, he bids George goodbye as "Sir Thomas". Name taken from Henry Irving.
- The Executioner – he makes an appearance only in A Man for All Seasons. If it is desired, the part can be played by the same actor as Henry. He bids George goodbye as "Sir Thomas".
- The Announcer – a voice over the loudspeaker who announces the cast for the performances and instructs the audience not to use flash photography (a warning which is ignored). When Ellen's character hears the announcer in the Checkmate scene, she comments, "Oh listen, Willie, a voice! Maybe there is a God!"
