= ABC's Wide World of Entertainment =

- Genre: Variety
- Country of origin: United States
- Original language: English

Production
- Running time: 90 minutes
- Production companies: Paramount Television; Columbia Pictures Television; Time Life Television; 20th Century Fox Television

Original release
- Network: American Broadcasting Company
- Release: January 8, 1973 – June 14, 1976

ABC's Wide World of Entertainment is a late night television block of programs created by the ABC television network. It premiered on January 8, 1973, and ended three years later. The title was based on the long-running broadcast ABC's Wide World of Sports; there was also an ABC's Wide World of Mystery broadcast from 1973 to 1978.

== Credits ==
Unable to find a single talk show to compete with NBC's The Tonight Show Starring Johnny Carson, the network aired a collection of comedy specials, documentaries, mystery movies, music concerts and talk shows with a variety of hosts. Included were The Dick Cavett Show, Jack Paar Tonite, Good Night America (a news magazine hosted by Geraldo Rivera), the live concert series In Concert, the UK-originated anthology series Thriller, and Comedy News (a parody of Eyewitness News with an ensemble cast of comedians and satirists including Kenneth Mars, Marian Mercer, Robert Klein, Mort Sahl and Dick Gregory). Initially, Paar, Cavett, comedy specials and mystery movies were each given one week per month.

Two nights of music concerts, broadcast every other Friday on weeks where specials or movies were broadcast, completed the monthly schedule. The 1975 and 1976 editions of Dick Clark's New Year's Rockin' Eve were also broadcast as "Wide World Specials".

== Monty Python broadcast ==
Monty Python's Flying Circus, the British comedy sketch television series, taped its last episode in December 1974 and was syndicated to American public broadcasting soon after. On October 3, 1975, ABC aired the first of two edited compilations of sketches from the series as one of its Wide World of Entertainment comedy specials. The Python group represented by Terry Gilliam, the group's only American-born member, sued ABC for copyright infringement.

== Zapruder film ==
On the March 6, 1975, edition of Good Night America, Rivera had as his guests assassination of John F. Kennedy researchers Robert J. Groden and Dick Gregory, who presented the first-ever network television showing of the Zapruder film. The public's response to that television showing quickly led to the forming of the Hart-Schweiker investigation, contributed to the Church Committee Investigation on Intelligence Activities by the United States, and resulted in the United States House Select Committee on Assassinations investigation.

== ABC Late Night ==
The comedy and variety specials did not last and, along with most talk shows, were dropped by the summer of 1974. They were replaced with reruns of television films and the programming block was re-titled ABC Late Night on January 12, 1976. In addition to movies (which were seen under the ABC Movie of the Week banner), the network aired a variety of prime-time series reruns including Police Woman, Mannix, Starsky & Hutch, Soap, Barney Miller, Charlie's Angels and Fantasy Island, with the only first-run programming a series of specials hosted by Geraldo Rivera and the sketch comedy series Fridays. However, not all programs were carried by all affiliates. ABC Late Night ended on October 22, 1982, being replaced with the talk show The Last Word on October 26. The Last Word last aired on April 22, 1983, replaced the following Monday by One On One hosted by The Last Word host Greg Jackson. One On One was canceled in July 1983, leaving ABC without regular late-night network programming—aside from Nightline and a short-lived block in the fall of 1986 featuring a revival of the Dick Cavett Show alternating with an interview show hosted by Jimmy Breslin—until January 6, 1992, when World News Now was launched.
