= Paraphrasing of copyrighted material =

Issue in copyright law

Paraphrasing of copyrighted material may, under certain circumstances, constitute copyright infringement. In most countries that have national copyright laws, copyright applies to the original expression in a work rather than to the meanings or ideas being expressed. Whether a paraphrase is an infringement of expression, or a permissible restatement of an idea, is not a binary question but a matter of degree. Copyright law in common law countries tries to avoid theoretical discussion of the nature of ideas and expression such as this, taking a more pragmatic view of what is called the idea/expression dichotomy. The acceptable degree of difference between a prior work and a paraphrase depends on a variety of factors and ultimately depends on the judgement of the court in each individual case.

== In Germany ==
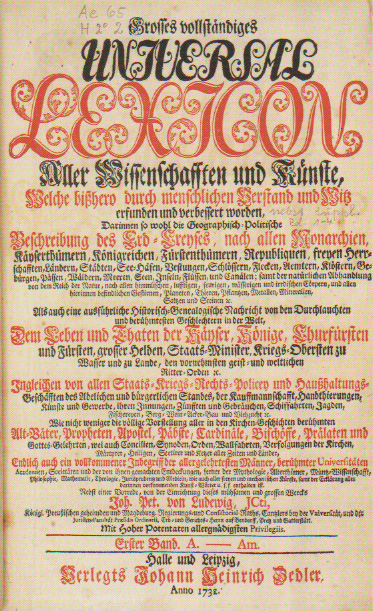
Johann Heinrich Zedler's right to publish his Universal-Lexicon was challenged on the grounds that an encyclopedia must always paraphrase other works.

An early example of the concept of paraphrasing as a copyright issue arose with Johann Heinrich Zedler's application in 1730 for copyright protection in Saxony for his Grosses vollständiges Universal-Lexicon, one of the first encyclopedias. The publisher of a rival General Historical Lexicon said that Zedler's Universal Lexicon would not differ in content from this and other existing lexicons apart from paraphrasing. On 16 October 1730, the Upper Consistory court in Dresden rejected Zedler's request, and warned that he would be subject to confiscation and a fine if he reproduced any material from the General Historical Lexicon in his Universal Lexicon.

== In the Soviet Union ==
The Soviet Union's Copyright Act of 1925 in essence said that a work created by a minimal paraphrase of an existing text could be considered a new work eligible for copyright. By 1991, the Copyright law of the Soviet Union had evolved to give much more protection to the author. Free use, similar to the English common law concept of fair use, was only allowed if it did not infringe upon the normal exploitation of the work or the legitimate interests of the author.

== In the United States ==
United States copyright law protects original expressions but not facts, methods, discoveries, or other ideas being expressed, a doctrine known as the idea–expression distinction. Despite making this distinction, verbatim copying is not always required for copyright infringement, as paraphrasing is also prohibited in certain circumstances.

US copyright law originates in the Copyright Clause (Article I, Section 8, Clause 8) of the Constitution, and has been the subject of several federal statutes, most recently the Copyright Act of 1976. The basic two-part test for copyright infringement under the 1976 Act, described by the US Supreme Court in Feist Publications, Inc., v. Rural Telephone Service Co., is (1) whether there is a valid copyright, and (2) whether there has been improper copying of the copyrighted work. The second prong also has a two-part test, first articulated in the Second Circuit case Arnstein v. Porter: (a) whether copying occurred (as opposed to independent creation), and (b) whether the copying amounts to an "improper appropriation", meaning that enough of the author's protected expression (and not unprotected ideas) was copied to give rise to a "substantial similarity" between the original work and the putative copy. Even if all prongs are met, there are fair use defenses that may defeat a claim of copyright infringement.

Beyond these basics, US copyright law is complex, confusing, and inconsistent, with a variety of tests employed by courts to determine when copyright has been infringed, including by paraphrasing. There is no single rule that defines when two works are substantially similar, or when paraphrasing is so "close" as to constitute infringement of a copyrighted expression as opposed to being a different way of expressing the same idea. There is a circuit split among the twelve federal appeals courts on substantial similarity analysis, with each circuit employing overlapping but unique approaches. Decisions are, by necessity, made on a case-by-case basis, with few universally-applicable principles.

=== Factual v. fictional works ===
When examining claims of copyright infringement, including by paraphrasing, US copyright law distinguishes between works of fiction (e.g., a novel) and works of fact (e.g., a history book or a set of instructions). Copyright protection for factual works is narrow, covering the author's original expressions, but not the facts or theories being expressed. In order to infringe, the copy must be "verbatim reproduction or very close paraphrasing".

Different courts adopt different approaches to analyzing whether paraphrasing in factual works constitutes infringement. Some courts have held that some factual works, particularly functional works such as instructions, lack the creativity required to meet the threshold of originality, and thus there can be no valid copyright under the first Feist prong. Other courts follow the "merger doctrine". Under the merger doctrine, if there are only a limited number of ways in which an idea can be expressed, the expression is said to have "merged" with the idea, and thus there can be no valid copyright under the 1976 Act. Some courts employ "thin copyright", finding that there is a valid copyright of factual works, but that it is afforded only limited protection against "virtual identicality" or "bodily appropriation of copyrighted expression", thus permitting paraphrasing that might be prohibited in other circumstances. Finally, some courts find that all prongs of the Feist and Arnstein tests are met, but that the copying is nevertheless permitted under the fair use doctrine. Fair use analysis includes multiple factors, one of which is the "nature of the copyright work," and some courts find that factual works provide greater leeway for fair use than fictional works.

Nonfiction literary works, such as history books, newspaper articles, and biographies, are treated as factual works with similarly narrow copyright protection. An author's unique expressions are protected, but not the facts and theories themselves. Even the selection and arrangement of facts may not be protectable. For example, an author may arrange a series of facts to support a theory for why a historical event occurred, but if the author could prevent others from using the same selection and arrangement of facts, the author would have an effective monopoly on the theory itself, which would run counter to US copyright law's prohibition on copyrighting ideas.

For fictional works, more than "very close paraphrasing" is protected. US copyright law protects against paraphrasing a story by, for example, copying a detailed plot sequence but using different language for the dialogue. However, under the doctrine of "scènes à faire", it does not protect more general patterns, such as story themes and character prototypes. Some courts will distinguish between "literal" similarities, such as verbatim duplication or paraphrasing, and "nonliteral similarities", such as the details of a novel's plot, characters, or settings. In his 2008 book Copyright's Paradox, discussing the conflict between protecting copyright and protecting free speech, Neil Netanel says, "Yeats [borrowed] from Shelley; Kafka from Kleist and Dickens; Joyce from Homer; and T.S. Eliot from Shakespeare, Whitman and Baudelaire, all in ways that would infringe today's bloated copyright."

== In music ==
Paraphrase may apply to music as well as to writing. It was commonplace for Baroque, Classical and Romantic composers to create variations on each other's work without permission. This would not be allowed today.

== See also ==
- Article spinning, in which paraphrasing is automated for search engine optimization, copyright evasion, or both

== Sources ==
- Barrett, Margreth (2008-03-19). Intellectual Property. Aspen Publishers Online. pp. 162–. ISBN 978-0-7355-6297-4.
- Bently, Lionel; Davis, Jennifer; Ginsburg, Jane C. (2010-10-28). Copyright and Piracy: An Interdisciplinary Critique. Cambridge University Press. ISBN 978-0-521-19343-6.
- Elst, M. (2005). Copyright, Freedom of Speech, and Cultural Policy in the Russian Federation. Leiden/Boston: Martinus Nijhoff. ISBN 90-04-14087-5.
- Gorman, Robert A. (2006) [1991]. Copyright Law (2nd ed.). Federal Judicial Center.
- Head, Dominic (2006-01-26). The Cambridge Guide To Literature In English. Cambridge University Press. ISBN 978-0-521-83179-6.
- Kirchhoff, Albrecht (1891). "Lesefrüchte aus den Acten des städtischen Archivs zu Leipzig 5: Klagen u. Mißstände im Anfang des 18. Jahrhunderts". Archiv für Geschichte des Buchwesens 14. pp. 196–269.
- Levitsky, S. L. (1964). Introduction to Soviet Copyright Law. Library of Congress Catalog Card Number 58-33118. Leiden: A.W. Sythoff.
- Lippman, Katherine (2013). "The Beginning of the End: Preliminary Results of an Empirical Study of Copyright Substantial Similarity Opinions in the U.S. Circuit Courts". Michigan State Law Review. 2013 (2). doi:10.17613/A8S5-ZY10.
- "Order against Zedler, rejecting his request for privilege, Leipzig". 12 October 1730.
- Patry, William (2012-03-08). How to Fix Copyright. Oxford University Press. ISBN 978-0-19-976009-1.
- Saint-Amour, Paul K. (2011). Modernism and Copyright. Oxford University Press. ISBN 978-0-19-973153-4.
