= Richard Maxwell =

Richard Maxwell may refer to:

- Richard Maxwell (academic) (1919–2016), American professor of law
- Richard Maxwell (director) (born 1967), American experimental theater director and playwright

== See also ==
- Maxwell (surname)
