= Michael T. Sauer =

American lawyer (1937–2021)

Michael Thomas Sauer (December 13, 1937 – May 14, 2021) was an American judge on the Los Angeles County Superior Court. He is best known for sentencing socialite Paris Hilton to 45 days in jail for violating the terms of her probation. He was previously a Deputy City Attorney for Los Angeles, California and unsuccessfully argued the famous Cohen v. California case before the United States Supreme Court.

== Early life ==
Sauer grew up in the Windsor Square neighborhood of Los Angeles. He attended Loyola Law School and later worked for eight years for the city attorney's office. In 1971, as deputy city attorney in charge of appellate cases, he unsuccessfully argued before the U.S. Supreme Court in the case of Cohen v. California (arguing against famed first amendment attorney Melville B. Nimmer) — an obscenity case stemming from a defendant who appeared in a county courtroom wearing a jacket decrying the draft.

Appointed to Los Angeles Municipal Court in 1972 by Governor Ronald Reagan, Sauer was elevated to the Superior Court bench in 2000 when the two courts combined. While on the bench in May 1993, Sauer was responsible for removing the MCA World Headquarters shooting by John Brian Jarvis to California Superior Court. In 2003, he was moved from criminal court cases to misdemeanor arraignments — a posting heavy on traffic violations and DUIs.

== Paris Hilton ==
In May 2007 Sauer sentenced socialite Paris Hilton to 45 days in jail for violating her probation. Following the sentencing, Sauer reportedly received a standing ovation from his church in Los Angeles. However, the judge stated that this incident did not occur, and was also surprised at the amount of publicity surrounding the jail sentence.

On Thursday, June 7, Los Angeles County Sheriff's Department officials released Hilton because of an undisclosed medical condition and sent her home under house arrest. She had been in jail for only three days. Hilton was fitted with an ankle monitor and was expected to finish her 45-day sentence at home. City attorney Rocky Delgadillo filed a petition late Thursday afternoon questioning whether Sheriff Lee Baca should be held in contempt of court for releasing Hilton on Thursday morning. Sauer himself had expressed his unhappiness with Hilton's release before Delgadillo asked him to return her to court. When Sauer sentenced Hilton to jail, he ruled specifically that she could not serve her sentence at home under electronic monitoring (house arrest).

The day after her release, June 8, Sauer ordered Hilton to report immediately to court, and then ordered her to return to jail to serve out her entire sentence.

== Death ==
Sauer died on May 14, 2021, at the age of 83.
