= Roth Greeting Cards v. United Card Co. =

- Court: United States Court of Appeals for the Ninth Circuit
- Full case name: Roth Greeting Cards v. United Card Co.
- Decided: July 10, 1970
- Citations: 429 F.2d 1106, 166 U.S.P.Q. 291 (9th Cir. 1970)

Court membership
- Judges sitting: Frederick George Hamley, Montgomery Oliver Koelsch, John Kilkenny

Case opinions
- Copyright may be infringed when total concept and feel is the same
- Decision by: Hamley
- Dissent: Kilkenny

Keywords
- copyright infringement

Roth Greeting Cards v. United Card Co., 429 F.2d 1106 (9th Cir. 1970), was a Ninth Circuit case involving the copyright of greeting cards that introduced the "total concept and feel" standard for determining substantial similarity. Courts used this test in later cases such as Reyher v. Children's Television Workshop (1976).

== Background ==
Roth Greeting Cards was engaged in the greeting card business. The company's writer would come up with ideas for the wording, which the president would review. If an idea was accepted, the president would make a rough sketch of the card design with notes on the artwork, which would be developed by the company artist, reviewed and refined until the card was ready to be printed and distributed to stores for sale. United Card Co had a similar approach, but at the time of the alleged infringement did not have a writer. The president and vice-president of United Card Co came up with ideas, and the vice-president made the pictures.

== District court decision ==
Roth sued United for infringement of their copyright in seven cards with similar messages and designs. Two examples were a picture of a cute doll with the words "I wuv you", and a picture of a boy sitting and crying with the words "I miss you already ..." and inside the card "... and you haven't even left". The vice-president of United admitted that he might have seen the Roth cards in stores that he visited to see what his competition was doing, and might have had samples of the Roth cards in his office, but denied copying.

The district court found for the defendant on two grounds. First, the court found that Roth Greeting Cards had not completed its registration of copyright ownership at the time the case was filed, and therefore the court did not have jurisdiction. Second, it found that, while pictures could be subject to copyright, the pictures on the United cards did not infringe on the copyright of the pictures on the Roth cards. The court found that the words were too commonplace to be subject to copyright. Roth appealed this decision.

== Appeals court decision ==
The United States Court of Appeals for the Ninth Circuit disagreed with the district court on the subject of jurisdiction. Roth had initiated filing for copyright well before the case was filed, and although there had been some delays in completing the process that was not relevant. The court agreed that the words could not be protected since they were too ordinary. However, it noted that the combination of the characters portrayed, the message, the mood and the layout was very similar. The "total concept and feel" were the same.

The court found that an ordinary person comparing the pairs of cards would consider that one was a copy of the other. Although it is always difficult to prove copying, United had admitted access. On this basis, copyright had been infringed. The court remanded the case back to the district court for further proceedings based on this decision. One of the judges dissented from this opinion, feeling that if there was no infringement of either the words or the artwork taken separately, there was no infringement.

== Results ==
The case became a standard example of a case where copyright infringement had been found based on evidence of access to the original work and substantial similarity in the total concept and feel of the two works. Later courts followed the decision in this case. See v. Durang (1983) cited the case in defending the practice when comparing two plays "as a whole" in looking for substantial similarity. The court in Hamil America, Inc v. GFI (1999) rejected "the broad proposition that 'in comparing designs for copyright infringement, we are required to dissect them into their separate components, and compare only those elements which are in themselves copyrightable.'" In BMS Entertainment / Heat Music LLC v. Bridges (2005) the court held that a combination of unoriginal elements in a song could be infringed if there were similarity in total concept and feel.

The court in the case of Sid & Marty Krofft Television Productions Inc. v. McDonald's Corp. (1977) refined the concept by establishing a two-stage comparison. An extrinsic test would determine similarity of general ideas, while an intrinsic test would compare the particular expressions used. The second test should be made by an "ordinary reasonable person" rather than an expert.
