= UCLA School of Law =

Public law school in Los Angeles, California

Coordinates: 34.073023°N 118.438443°W

University of California, Los Angeles School of Law
- Parent school: University of California, Los Angeles
- Established: 1949
- School type: Public law school
- Parent endowment: $7.7 billion (2022–2023)
- Dean: Michael Waterstone
- Location: Los Angeles, California, U.S.
- Enrollment: 1,086 (as of May 18, 2022)
- Faculty: 104
- USNWR ranking: 12th (2025)
- Bar pass rate: 92.47% (July 2022 1st time takers)
- Website: law.ucla.edu
- ABA profile: Standard 509 Report

The University of California, Los Angeles School of Law (commonly known as UCLA School of Law or UCLA Law) is the law school of the University of California, Los Angeles.

== History ==
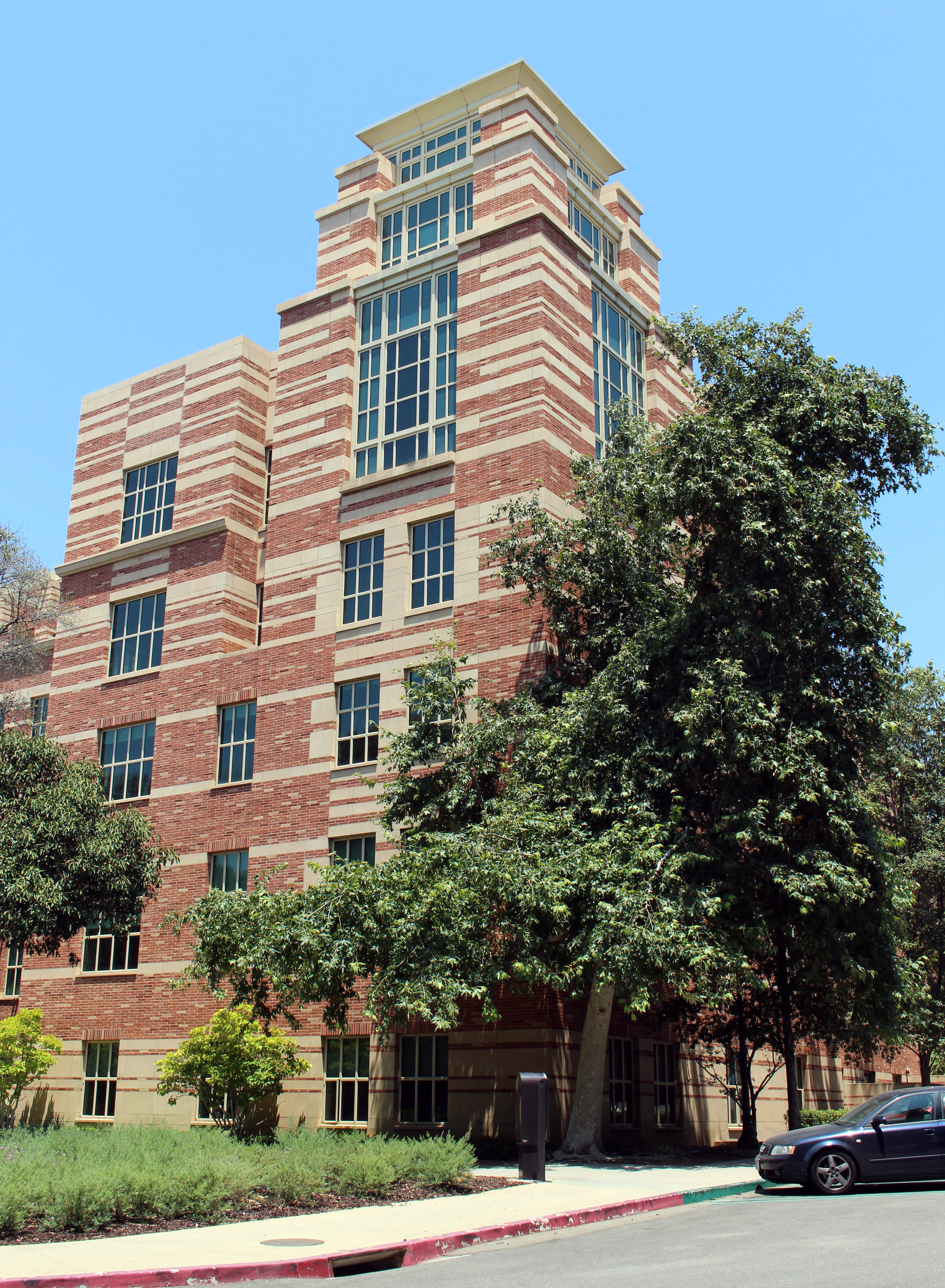
The Hugh and Hazel Darling Law Library, UCLA School of Law

Founded in 1949, the UCLA School of Law is the third oldest of the five law schools within the University of California system. It was established by legislation authored by State Assemblyman William H. Rosenthal in 1947.

In the 1930s, initial efforts to establish a law school at UCLA were not successful as a result of resistance from UC president Robert Gordon Sproul, and additionally because UCLA's supporters eventually refocused their efforts on establishing medical and engineering schools.

During the mid-1940s, the impetus for the creation of the UCLA School of Law emerged from outside of the UCLA community. Assemblyman Rosenthal conceived of, and fought for, the creation of the first public law school in Southern California as a convenient and affordable alternative to the expensive private law school at USC. Rosenthal's first attempt, in 1945, failed, but his second attempt gained momentum when the State Bar of California and the UCLA Alumni Association announced their support for the bill. On July 18, 1947, Governor Earl Warren authorized the appropriation of $1 million for the construction of a new law school at UCLA by signing Assembly Bill 1361 into state law.

Selecting the law school's first dean was difficult and delayed its opening by a year. UCLA's law school planning committee prioritized merit, while the then-conservative Regents of the University of California prioritized political beliefs. Another factor was a simultaneous deanship vacancy at the Berkeley Law. Near the end of 1948, the committee finally identified a sufficiently conservative candidate willing to take the job: L. Dale Coffman, the then dean of Vanderbilt University Law School. The Regents believed Coffman would help bring balance to the UCLA campus, which they saw as overrun by Communists.

Coffman was able to recruit faculty to UCLA, including Roscoe Pound, Brainerd Currie, Rollin M. Perkins, and Harold Verrall. To build a law library, he hired Thomas S. Dabagh, the librarian of the Los Angeles County Law Library. The UCLA School of Law officially opened in September 1949 in temporary quarters in former military barracks behind Royce Hall, and moved into a permanent home upon the completion of the original Law Building in 1951.

The new law school at Los Angeles was the first UC law school to be formally named a "school of law", the first to obtain a full subsidy from the Board of Regents for its law review, and the first to obtain partial autonomy for its faculty from the university's academic senate. These developments had a considerable impact on Berkeley Law, which then changed its name, finally got its own subsidy for its law review, and battled with the other faculty at the Berkeley campus to avoid ejection of its faculty from the academic senate (because the amendments to the regents' standing orders affected faculty at all UC professional schools offering courses only at the graduate level).

Coffman's deanship, however, ended allegedly due to his strongly prejudiced and vindictive personality. Coffman drove out Dabagh in 1952 after they could not bridge their fundamental differences over how to run the law library; a dispute that was widely regarded by the UCLA community as contributing to Dabagh's early death in 1959. On September 21, 1955, the faculty revolted in the form of a memorandum to chancellor Raymond B. Allen, alleging that Coffman was categorically refusing to hire Jews or anyone he perceived to be leftist, and that the school's reputation was deteriorating because Coffman's abrasive personality had led to excessive faculty turnover. On May 24, 1956, Coffman was stripped of his deanship after a lengthy investigation by a panel of deans concerning his biases and his "dictatorial, undemocratic, and autocratic" management style. He remained on the faculty until his forced retirement in 1973, but continued to face allegations as late as 1971 that he was "an unreconstructed McCarthyite and pro-segregationist."

Coffman's successor was Richard C. Maxwell, who served as the second dean of UCLA Law from 1958 to 1969. Dean Maxwell "presided over happier, more harmonious years of institutional growth", and it was under his deanship that UCLA became "the youngest top-ranked law school in the country." Dabagh's successor, Louis Piacenza, was able to grow the law school's library collection to 143,000 volumes by May 1963, which at that time was the 14th largest law school library in the United States.

By 1963, the law school had 600 students in a building designed for 550, and the law building's deficiencies had become all too evident, such as a complete lack of air conditioning. In October 1963, the law school administration announced a major remodeling and expansion project, which added air conditioning and a new wing to the building. During the 1960s, the law school grew so quickly that the new wing was already insufficient upon its completion in January 1967. From its founding to the end of the 20th century, UCLA Law struggled with severe overcrowding, as librarians, faculty, staff, and as many as 18 student organizations—at one point, more than any other law school in the United States—competed for limited space in the law building for books, classes, conferences, and offices.

The chronic space shortage was ultimately relieved by the addition of a wing for clinical education and, after four years of construction, completion of the Hugh and Hazel Darling Law Library in January 2000.

Under Maxwell, the faculty increased from 12 to 37 professors, and the school hired its first female and African-American faculty members. Under Murray Schwartz, who led the school from 1969 to 1975, and William Warren, who served as dean from 1975 to 1982, the school became a pioneer in clinical legal education, developing a skills-based approach that remains among the school's hallmarks.

In 1973, students created a network of student-run legal clinics first known as El Centro Legal de Santa Monica, which continues to provide pro bono services around Los Angeles with 15 separate clinics.

=== Admissions and campus disputes ===
In 1999, following California's Proposition 209, only two of UCLA Law's 286 entering students were Black, compared with 19 in 1996. On February 24, 2000, twelve law students were arrested after occupying the school's records office to protest its admissions policies.

In September 2026, a UCLA Law symposium examining the legal consequences of the September 11 attacks drew criticism for including an attorney who had represented Khalid Sheikh Mohammed. Chancellor Julio Frenk publicly distanced the university from the event, prompting protests from faculty members who argued that his response undermined academic freedom. Sixty UCLA Law faculty members and more than 250 other academics signed letters criticizing his remarks. Frenk subsequently reaffirmed that the symposium was protected by academic freedom.

In October 2026, the United States Department of Justice announced that its investigation had found UCLA Law's admissions practices discriminated against white and Asian applicants during the 2023–2025 admissions cycles. According to the department's analysis, Black applicants in 2025 had approximately seven times the odds of admission of otherwise comparable white applicants. UCLA disputed the findings, maintaining that its admissions process complied with applicable law. The findings were administrative rather than judicial.

== Academics ==
UCLA Law has approximately 1,000 students enrolled in its Juris Doctor (J.D.) program and 200 in its Master of Laws (LL.M.) program. It also offers a Doctor of Juridical Science (S.J.D.) program for students who already have a J.D. and hope to become law professors, as well as a Master of Legal Studies (M.L.S.) program for those who do not seek a law degree, but find a legal education an important complement to their professional obligations. The Master of Legal Studies degree also offers a Concurrent Degree Program for David Geffen School of Medicine students (MD/MLS).

The school allows students to represent clients under supervision. UCLA Law's clinics also provide services to many people who cannot afford to pay for their legal services, including veterans, the homeless, and individuals appearing in criminal and immigration courts. In 2017, the school opened the Documentary Film Legal Clinic and Music Industry Clinic, which provide legal services to aspiring visual journalists, musicians, and entrepreneurs in the arts, and the Veterans Justice Clinic at the West Los Angeles VA Medical Center.

Students can elect to specialize in law and policy, business law and policy, entertainment law, environmental law, public interest law, critical race studies, and law and philosophy. The roughly 300 students who begin law school at UCLA every year are organized into sections. Students take all of their first-year courses with their sections.

Several joint degree programs are available, which require four years of study and result in the simultaneous award of a Juris Doctor and master's degree in Afro-American studies, American Indian studies, law and management, public health, public policy, philosophy, social welfare, and urban planning.

=== Faculty and students ===
J.D. entering class of 2026 profile
- 122 undergraduate schools represented
- 63% female; 35% male; 2% non-binary
- 58% students of color
- 64% California residents; 36% non-residents
- 9% majored in engineering, technology, science or math
- 18% are the first in their families to have completed college

The UCLA School of Law has a faculty of over 100 with expertise in all major disciplines of law, representing "one of the most diverse in the country." Thirteen members of the school's tenured faculty have been recognized for being the most-cited scholars in their areas of specialty. The school faculty is ranked 11th for scholarship, up from 15th in 2010 and 13th in 2013.

In 2023, 6,457 students applied to attend UCLA Law, and 315 were enrolled. The median LSAT score for members of the entering class in 2023 is 170.

=== Centers and legal clinics ===
The Center for Immigration Law and Policy (CILP) works with the intersection of Immigration Scholarship and practice. It works with the Immigrant Family Legal Clinic and the Immigrant's Right Policy Clinic.

The Ziffren Institute for Media, Entertainment, Technology & Sports Law offers students courses and programming related to entertainment, intellectual property, business, and technology law. The Institute has strong relationship with many well-regarded lawyers working in Hollywood, including its namesake and primary benefactor, Ken Ziffren. The Institute also host an annual symposium.

== Campus ==
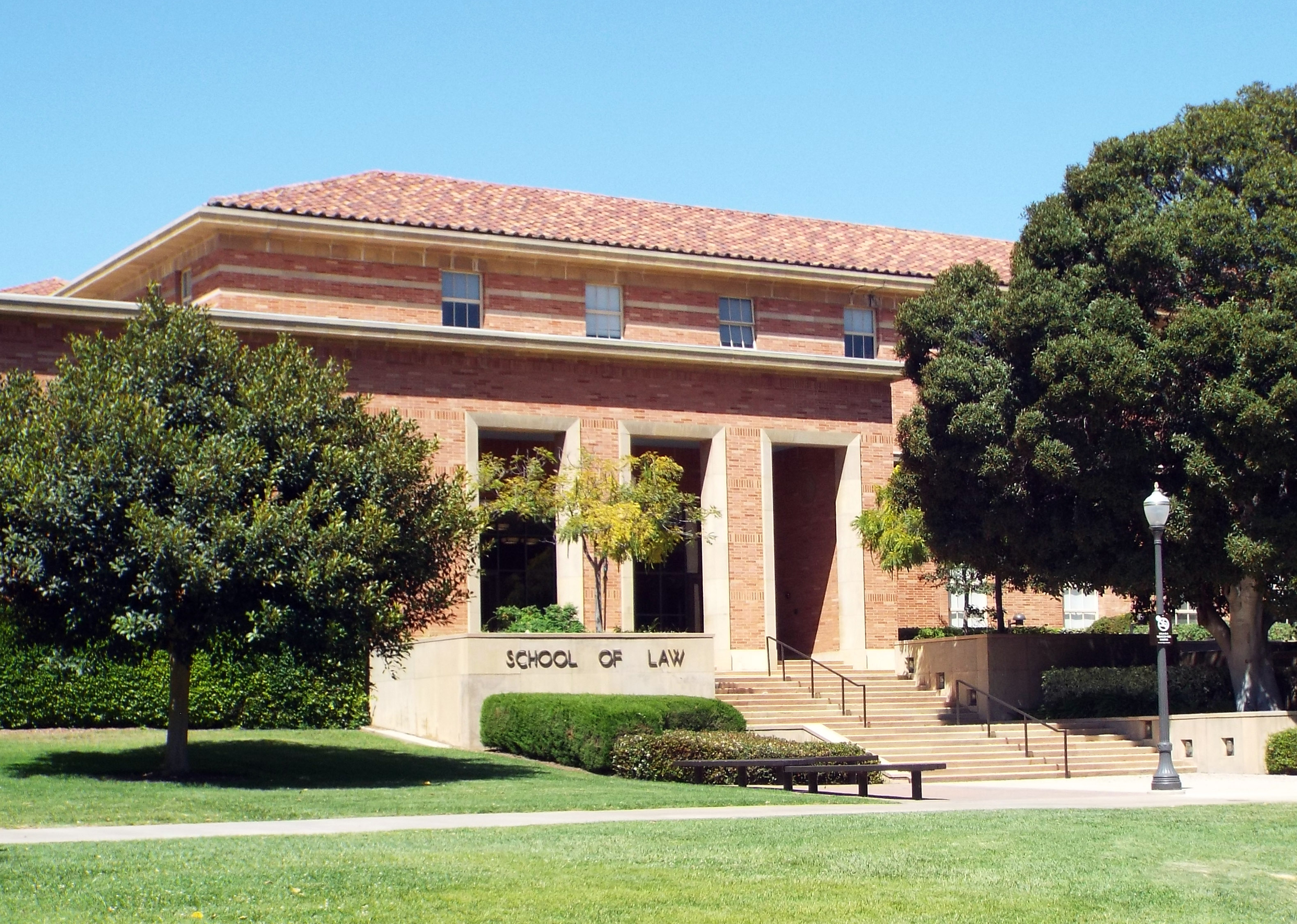
UCLA School of Law's south entrance facing Charles E. Young Drive East

UCLA School of Law is located on the UCLA campus in the Westwood area of Los Angeles.

The school proper is housed in a three-story brick building known simply as the Law Building, with the law library tower extending to five stories. The oldest parts of the Law Building's interior are notorious for a "high school atmosphere" and "dark, drafty classrooms". However, the Law Building has been extensively improved by the addition of the clinical wing in 1990 and the new law library in 2001. A few offices, such as the Office of Career Services, are housed in an adjacent building, Dodd Hall.

== Reception ==
=== Rankings ===
In 2026, U.S. News & World Report ranked UCLA as 13th among U.S. law schools, including 4th in trial advocacy, 4th in environmental law, 9th in criminal law, 12th (tied) in tax law, and 30th in Law Schools With the Most Graduates in Federal Clerkships. In 2022, UCLA joined a growing list of law schools that said they would no longer actively participate in the U.S. News rankings.

According to Brian Leiter's law school reports, UCLA Law ranked 12th in the nation for faculties in terms of scholarly distinction in 2022.

The Hollywood Reporter has repeatedly ranked UCLA as the number one school for entertainment law.

=== Bar passage rates ===
In October 2020, UCLA Law's bar passage rates were 97% in California and 100% in New York.

American Bar Association data shows that more than 95% of 2019 graduates had secured full-time, long-term, JD-required employment within 10 months of graduation.

== People ==
=== Current faculty ===
- Khaled Abou El Fadl – Omar and Azmeralda Alfi Distinguished Professor of Law and scholar of Islamic Jurisprudence; chairman of Islamic Studies Department at UCLA
- Stephen Bainbridge – corporations and business law
- Ann E. Carlson – U.S. environmental law and policy
- Kimberlé Crenshaw – founding coordinator of the "Critical Race Theory Workshop" movement; also teaches at Columbia Law School
- Ariela Gross – contract law, constitutional law, enslavement and racialization in U.S. legal history
- Cheryl Harris – civil rights, civil liberties, and critical race theory
- Richard L. Hasen – election law and campaign finance; director, Safeguarding Democracy Project
- Lynn M. LoPucki – Security Pacific Bank Professor of Law; her Bankruptcy Research Database provides data for empirical work bankruptcy
- Hiroshi Motomura – immigration law
- David Nimmer – copyright law
- Frances Olsen – feminist legal theory
- Angela R. Riley – indigenous rights, chief justice of Citizen Potawatomi Nation (2010–present)
- Seana Shiffrin – philosophy of law
- Eugene Volokh – author of textbooks on First Amendment law and academic legal writing; author of over 45 law review articles; founder of The Volokh Conspiracy blog
- Adam Winkler – author of Gunfight: The Battle over the Right to Bear Arms in America and We the Corporations: How Corporate America Won Its Civil Rights
- Ken Ziffren – entertainment attorney; founder of UCLA Law's Ziffren Center for Media, Entertainment, Technology and Sports Law

=== Former faculty ===
- Richard L. Abel – member of the faculty since 1974; scholar of the sociology of law
- Brainerd Currie – professor (1949–1952); expert on the conflict of laws in the United States
- Jesse Dukeminier – professor (1963–2003); property law, wills, trusts, and estates
- James L. Malone – associate dean (1961–1967); later became Assistant Secretary of State for Oceans and International Environmental and Scientific Affairs (1981–1985)
- Mari Matsuda – first female Asian-American law professor to obtain tenure at any law school in the United States, while teaching at UCLA Law in 1998
- Richard C. Maxwell – dean of the School of Law (1958–1969)
- Jennifer Mnookin – evidence (law) (2005–2022), became chancellor of the University of Wisconsin–Madison in 2022
- Melville B. Nimmer – professor (1962–1985); U.S. copyright law and father of David Nimmer
- Cruz Reynoso – professor (1991–2001), former associate justice of the Supreme Court of California (1982–1987)
- Michael H. Schill – dean and professor (2004–2009), property law and urban planning; became president of the University of Oregon in 2015 and president of Northwestern University in 2022
- Lynn Stout – professor (2001–2012); corporate law, securities, and derivatives
