= Reyher v. Children's Television Workshop =

American legal case

- Court: United States Court of Appeals for the Second Circuit
- Full case name: Rebecca REYHER and Ruth Gannett v. CHILDREN'S TELEVISION WORKSHOP and Tuesday Publications, Inc.
- Argued: 31 October 1975
- Decided: 5 April 1976
- Citation: 533 F.2d 87

Court membership
- Judges sitting: Mulligan, Oakes and Meskill

Case opinions
- The essence of infringement lies in taking not a general theme but its particular expression through similarities of treatment, details, scenes, events and characterization

Keywords
- copyright infringement

Reyher v. Children's Television Workshop (2d Cir. 1976) was a case where the author and illustrator of a children's book sued a company that had published a TV skit and a magazine story with a similar title and plot, claiming copyright infringement. The story was based on an old Russian folk tale. The court found that the plot or theme was not subject to copyright, and there had been no infringement since the book and the story or skit were quite different in all other respects. The court used the "total concept and feel" standard in reaching their decision.

== Background ==
Rebecca Reyher wrote My Mother Is The Most Beautiful Woman In The World, a children's book, and Ruth Gannett illustrated it. The book retells an old Russian story about a small girl who helps her mother on the farm and in the kitchen. On the eve of a festival, when a crowd has gathered, they become separated. The girl asks various strangers if they have seen her mother, describing her as the most beautiful woman in the world. Possible candidates are sought out and brought to where the crowd has gathered, but none are the mother. When the mother eventually shows up, it turns out that she is quite homely in appearance, at least to others.

Children's Television Workshop (CTW) produced the Sesame Street TV program and published a related magazine, Sesame Street Magazine. Jon Stone wrote a script for a TV skit on the story called The Most Beautiful Woman In The World, which was aired as part of the TV program. Tibor Gergely created illustrations of the script, published in the Sesame Street Magazine. Tuesday Publications also published the story in their Tuesday At Home magazine. Although the plot was similar, the illustrations showed a small boy somewhere in Africa and the story was much shorter and simpler. The morals of the two versions are not quite the same. The book says that love makes people seem beautiful, while the CTW story says that different people have different views of beauty.

== District court findings ==
Reyher and Gannett sued for copyright infringement, but their case was dismissed by the United States District Court for the Southern District of New York. The District court found "substantial similarity between the two works", but described the book as derivative from a work already in the public domain, so the plot could not be protected. Only the original expression could be protected, and the District court did not find evidence of copying of the text or the illustrations. Reyher and Gannett appealed the decision.

== Appeals court findings ==
The United States Court of Appeals for the Second Circuit heard the appeal on 31 October 1975. Rebecca Reyher testified that her mother had told her the story, which she had adapted for the children's book. Stone and Gergely said they had also heard versions of the story, but denied having seen Reyher's book. Reyher claimed that the total concept and feel of her work had been copied, even though there had been no literal copying or paraphrasing.

The court disagreed with the district court's findings that the work was "derivative", due to the difficulty of defining the original work, but also disagreed that there was substantial similarity. The court observed that it was axiomatic that "the protection granted to a copyrightable work extends only to the particular expression of an idea and never to the idea itself." The court used the "total concept and feel" standard for determining substantial similarity that had been laid out by the Ninth Circuit in Roth Greeting Cards v. United Card Co (1970). The court found that there had not been copying, since the different versions were very different in style and in detail, saying "the essence of infringement lies in taking not a general theme but its particular expression through similarities of treatment, details, scenes, events and characterization."

== Reactions and results ==
Various commentators have discussed Reyher. Taking it as an example of the idea-expression dichotomy, some have said it shows the clear distinction between the idea, which cannot be copyrighted, and the expression, which can. Others have said it shows the difficulty of distinguishing between the two. It has also been discussed in terms of the scènes à faire doctrine, under which scenes or events that follow inevitably from the situation, in this case, a child separated from a mother and trying to describe her to strangers, cannot be subject to copyright. The findings have been cited in other cases, such as Wainwright Securities v. Wall Street Transcript Corp (1977) and Monty Python v. American Broadcasting Companies, Inc. (1976).
