= Apple Computer, Inc. v. Microsoft Corp. =

1994 copyright infringement lawsuit

Apple Computer, Inc. v. Microsoft Corporation
- Court: United States Court of Appeals for the Ninth Circuit
- Full case name: Apple Computer, Inc. v. Microsoft Corporation and Hewlett-Packard Co.
- Argued: July 11, 1994
- Decided: September 19, 1994
- Citations: 35 F.3d 1435; 63 USLW 2259, 1994 Copr. L. Dec. (CCH) ¶ 27,301, 32 U.S.P.Q.2d 1086

Court membership
- Judges sitting: Ferdinand Francis Fernandez, Pamela Ann Rymer, Thomas G. Nelson

Case opinions
- Majority: Rymer, joined by a unanimous court

Apple Computer, Inc. v. Microsoft Corporation, 35 F.3d 1435 (9th Cir. 1994), was a copyright infringement lawsuit in which Apple Computer, Inc. (now Apple Inc.) sought to prevent Microsoft and Hewlett-Packard from using visual graphical user interface (GUI) elements that were similar to those in Apple's Lisa and Macintosh operating systems. The court ruled that "Apple cannot get patent-like protection for the idea of a graphical user interface, or the idea of a desktop metaphor [under copyright law]...". In the midst of the Apple v. Microsoft lawsuit, Xerox also sued Apple alleging that Mac's GUI was heavily based on Xerox's. The district court dismissed Xerox's claims without addressing whether Apple's GUI infringed Xerox's. Apple lost all claims in the Microsoft suit except for the ruling that the trash can icon and folder icons from Hewlett-Packard's NewWave windows application were infringing. The lawsuit was filed in 1988 and lasted four years; the decision was affirmed on appeal in 1994, and Apple's appeal to the U.S. Supreme Court was denied.

== Background ==
Apple Inc. had agreed to license certain parts of its GUI to Microsoft for use in Windows 1.0, but when Microsoft made changes in Windows 2.0 adding overlapping windows and other features found in the Macintosh GUI, Apple filed suit. Apple added additional claims to the suit when Microsoft released Windows 3.0.

Apple claimed the "look and feel" of the Macintosh operating system, taken as a whole, was protected by copyright, and that each element of the interface (such as the existence of windows on the screen, the rectangular appearance of windows, and their ability to be resized, overlap, and have title bars) was not as important as all these elements taken together. After oral arguments, the court insisted on an analysis of specific GUI elements that Apple claimed were infringements. Apple listed 189 GUI elements; the court decided that 179 of these elements had been licensed to Microsoft in the Windows 1.0 agreement and most of the remaining 10 elements were not copyrightable —either they were unoriginal to Apple, or they were the only possible way of expressing a particular idea.

Midway through the suit, Xerox filed a lawsuit against Apple claiming Apple had infringed copyrights Xerox held on its GUIs. Xerox had invited the Macintosh design team to view their GUI computers at the PARC research lab; these visits had been very influential on the development of the Macintosh GUI. Xerox's lawsuit appeared to be a defensive move to ensure that if Apple v. Microsoft established that "look and feel" was copyrightable, then Xerox would be the primary beneficiary, rather than Apple. The Xerox case was dismissed, for a variety of legal reasons, most notably that Xerox "had waited too long to file a copyright infringement case and had to resort to a weaker charge of unfair competition".

== Court case ==
The district court ruled that it would require a standard of "virtual identity" between Windows and the Macintosh at trial for Apple to prove copyright infringement. Apple believed the standard to be too narrow and believed also that a more broad "look and feel" was all that should be necessary at trial. As a result, both parties agreed that a jury trial was unnecessary given the rulings, and Apple filed an appeal to the Ninth Circuit Court of Appeals to have the district court's characterization overruled.

After the district court ruled in favor of Microsoft, Apple appealed the decision arguing that the district court only considered infringements on the individual elements of Apple's GUI, rather than the interface as a whole. The appeals court almost entirely affirmed the ruling of the district court, establishing that, "almost all the similarities spring either from the license or from basic ideas and their obvious expression... illicit copying could occur only if the works as a whole are virtually identical." However, the circuit court did reverse the district court's decision not to award attorney's fees to Microsoft, clarifying and sending the case back to the district court to resolve the issue.

Citing Brown Bag Software v. Symantec Corp., the circuit court dissected the GUI to separate expression from ideas (as expression, but not ideas, are covered by copyright law). The court outlined five ideas that it identified as basic to a GUI desktop: windows, icon images of office items, manipulations of icons, menus, and the opening and closing of objects. The court established that Apple could not make copyright claims based on these ideas and could only make claims on the precise expression of them.

The court also pointed out that many of Apple's claims fail on an originality basis. Apple admittedly licensed many of its representations from Xerox, and copyright protection only extends to the original expression. Apple returned to its "complete look and feel" argument, stating that while the individual components were not original, the complete GUI was. The court rejected these arguments because the parts were not original.

== Impact ==
Much of the court's ruling was based on the original licensing agreement between Apple and Microsoft for Windows 1.0, and this fact made the case more of a contractual matter than of copyright law, to the chagrin of Apple. This also meant that the court avoided a more far-reaching "look and feel copyright" precedent ruling. However, the case did establish that the analytic dissection (rather than the general "look and feel") of a user interface is vital to any copyright decision on such matters.

In 1997, three years after the lawsuit was decided, all lingering infringement questions against Microsoft regarding the Lisa and Macintosh GUI as well as Apple's "QuickTime piracy" lawsuit against Microsoft were settled in direct negotiations. Apple agreed to make Internet Explorer its default browser, to the detriment of Netscape. Microsoft agreed to continue developing Microsoft Office and other software for the Mac over the next five years. Microsoft also purchased $150 million of nonvoting Apple stock. Both parties entered into a patent cross-licensing agreement.

== See also ==
- Apple Inc. litigation
- Microsoft litigation
- Pirates of Silicon Valley
