= UCLA Master of Legal Studies =

Public law school in Los Angeles, California

Coordinates: 34.073023°N 118.438443°W

University of California, Los Angeles School of Law, Master of Legal Studies
- Parent school: University of California, Los Angeles
- Established: 2019
- School type: Public law school
- Parent endowment: $7.7 billion (2022–2023)
- Dean: Michael Waterstone
- Location: Los Angeles, California, U.S.
- Enrollment: UCLA School of Law Total: 1,086 (as of May 18, 2022)
- Faculty: UCLA School of Law total: 104
- Website: law.ucla.edu/academics/programs/master-legal-studies

The University of California, Master of Legal Studies (also known as UCLA M.L.S. Program) is a degree for professional advancement at the University of California, Los Angeles.

== History ==
In December 2019, UCLA Law School announced a Master of Legal Studies program which would provide students with a master's degree at less cost, and in less time, than a JD degree. The program is designed for working professionals seeking an advanced understanding of legal principles without pursuing a JD degree.

In 2020, Jennifer Mnookin, then dean of the Law School at UCLA told CNBC, "There’s an enormous number of people who engage with the law, who need to work with lawyers, who need to know a decent amount about the law for what they do, but they don't actually need the license. They don't need to be lawyers."

The program's first class graduated in 2021 and was included in the UCLA School of Law graduation. The event featured live remarks, delivered from the law school, by keynote speaker U.S. Rep. Ted Lieu and then UCLA Law Dean Jennifer Mnookin. Recorded messages from special guests included UCLA and NBA player Bill Walton, as well as law school alumni Judge Paul Watford of the U.S. Court of Appeals for the Ninth Circuit and U.S. Senator. Kirsten Gillibrand.

Mnookin was succeeded by Russell Korobkin as interim dean of UCLA School of Law, followed by Michael Waterstone as Dean of UCLA School of Law on August 1, 2023, who also oversees the UCLA Master of Legal Studies.

The program launched its hybrid and online options in the Fall 2024.

== Academics ==
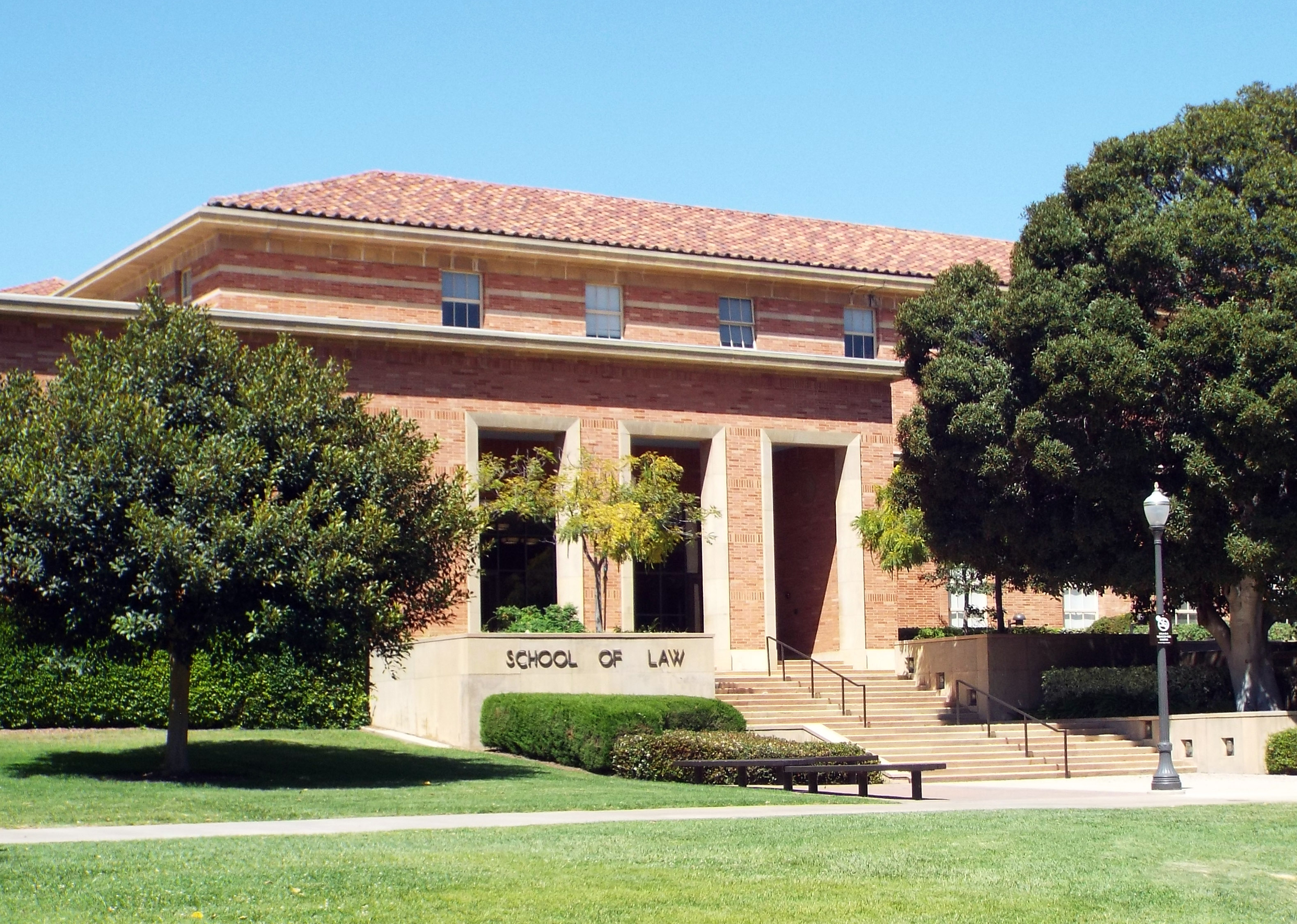
UCLA School of Law's south entrance facing Charles E. Young Drive East

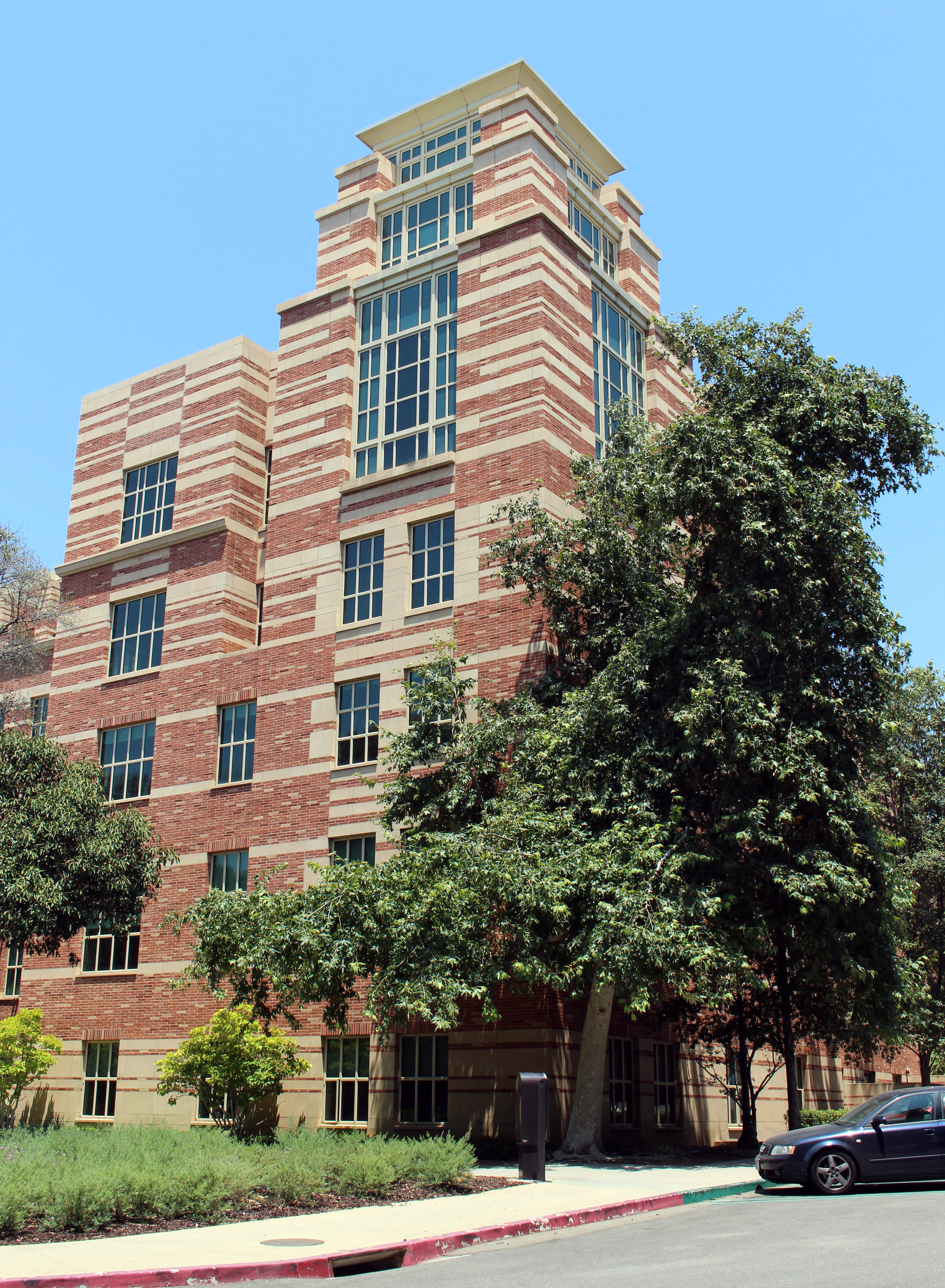
The Hugh and Hazel Darling Law Library, UCLA School of Law

The UCLA Master of Legal Studies offers online, in-person and hybrid options. It is located on the UCLA campus in the Westwood area of Los Angeles.

The program is structured into three phases: core classes, specialization electives, and capstone. Phase 1 focuses on core courses, Phase 2 involves specializations and elective courses tailored to career goals (i.e. Entertainment Law, Public Interest Law, etc.), and Phase 3 culminates in a capstone project or seminar for deeper engagement with legal topics. The program can be completed in 9 months with full-time study or in 2–4 years with part-time study.

Specializations are Business Law, Employment & Human Resources Law, Entertainment & Media Law, Health Law & Policy, Law & Technology, Criminal Law, Government & National Security Law, Public Interest Law, Environmental Law, and General Studies. The program also offers self-designed specializations. 26 credits are required to graduate.

All nine specializations offered can be done on campus. The specializations of Business Law, Employment & Human Resources Law, Entertainment & Media Law, Health Law & Policy, and Law & Technology can be done online.

Since Fall 2023, the program has offered a concurrent and articulated MD/ MLS degree for UCLA David Geffen School of Medicine students.

=== Students ===
In 2026, there were 95 incoming students in the program pursuing a master of legal studies degree (M.L.S.). 38% of all new students reside outside of the Los Angeles area. 32.6% hold advanced degrees, over 15% are chief executives or vice presidents, and nearly one-third are directors or managers.

== Reception ==
In 2025, The Princeton Review ranked UCLA's Master of Legal Studies program as one of the Best Online Master of Studies in Law Programs for 2025.

== Alumni ==
Alumni of UCLA Master of Legal Studies include Peter Arceo and UCLA Bruins quarterback Chase Griffin. Griffin reported to Business Insider that he chose studying entertainment, media, and sports law because he wanted to understand the contract side of his talent and production work.
