= The Wall Street Transcript =

- Type: Private corporation
- Headquarters: 622 Third Avenue; 34th Floor; New York, NY 10017
- Website: www.twst.com

The Wall Street Transcript is a paid subscription publication and Web site that publishes bi-weekly industry reports that feature equity analyst, money manager and CEO interviews. Reports typically cover two to three industries and express money managers' and analysts' views on each of the various industry sectors, as well as interviews with CEOs whose companies operate within the covered industries.

In publication since 1963, The Wall Street Transcript is a publication in the finance community, which has interviewed the CEOs and senior executives of public companies, money managers handling billions of dollars of assets, and equity analysts from leading investment banks around the world and publishing these interviews verbatim. The Wall Street Transcript does not endorse the views of those interviewed, nor does it make stock recommendations. The Wall Street Transcript highlights micro-cap and small-cap stocks that may go overlooked by many investors, while its CEO interviews often offer commentary to investors in larger-cap stocks as well. Large investment houses such as Merrill Lynch, Morgan Stanley, and Goldman Sachs contribute their opinions on various market topics regularly to The Wall Street Transcript.

The Wall Street Transcript has been awarded various awards and accolades, as well as having been cited by Forbes as the Best Web Site Publication for Stock Picking. It has around 200,000 readers every month, 5,000 readers who choose to receive publications in print; furthermore 67 percent of these readers invest more than $75,000 annually and 71 percent of the readers have annual incomes greater than $100,000.

Seeking Alpha, a free provider of financial and stock analysis from blogs, newsletters and money managers, publishes excerpts of Wall Street Transcript reports on its Web site.

Notable CEOs who have interviewed with The Wall Street Transcript include William P. Lauder, executive chairman and chairman of The Estee Lauder Companies' board of directors, MGM Mirage Chairman and CEO James J. Murren and John Wareham, CEO of Beckman Coulter.

Analysts and money managers from investment firms such as Goldman Sachs & Co., UBS, Credit Suisse and RBC Capital Markets have also appeared in interviews with The Wall Street Transcript.

== Founder ==
Richard Holman (1923–2000) was the founder, owner and CEO of the Wall Street Transcript from 1963 to 1998. After a brief career in investment banking, Holman founded the Transcript, believing that investment professionals and casual investors would be willing to pay for information that would help them pick stocks.

From the late 1960s through late 1970s, Holman was involved in a series of court cases with the U.S. Securities and Exchange Commission (S.E.C.), focused around whether the Wall Street Transcript published investment news or investment advice. The case ultimately ended in 1978 with S.E.C. v. Wall Street Transcript, in which the publication was determined to be a legitimate news organization and not an investment adviser.

Holman was born in New York City, son of former New York state assemblyman Abraham Goodman. He graduated from Cornell University and served in the Army during World War II in Japan and the Philippines.

== See also ==
- Wainwright Securities Inc. v. Wall Street Transcript Corp.
