= Cohen v. California =

1971 U.S. Supreme Court case on freedom of speech and public civility

- Supreme Court of the United States

Argued February 22, 1971 Decided June 7, 1971
- Full case name: Paul Robert Cohen, Appellant v. State of California
- Citations: 403 U.S. 15 (more) 91 S. Ct. 1780; 29 L.2d 284; 1971 U.S. LEXIS 32
- Argument: Oral argument

Case history
- Prior: Defendant convicted, Los Angeles Municipal Court; affirmed, 81 Cal. Rptr. 503 (Cal. Ct. App. 1969); rehearing denied, Court of Appeal of California, Second Appellate District 11-13-69; review denied, Supreme Court of California, 12-17-69
- Subsequent: Rehearing denied, 404 U.S. 876 (1971).

Holding
- The First Amendment, as applied through the Fourteenth, prohibits states from making the public display of a single four-letter expletive a criminal offense, without a more specific and compelling reason than a general tendency to disturb the peace. The First Amendment places a heavy burden on the justification of prior restraint in order to curtail free speech. Court of Appeal of California reversed.

Court membership
- Chief Justice Warren E. Burger Associate Justices Hugo Black · William O. Douglas; John M. Harlan II · William J. Brennan Jr. Potter Stewart · Byron White; Thurgood Marshall · Harry Blackmun

Case opinions
- Majority: Harlan, joined by Douglas, Brennan, Stewart, Marshall
- Dissent: Blackmun, joined by Burger, Black; White (in part)

Laws applied
- U.S. Const. amends. I, XIV; Cal. Penal Code § 415

Cohen v. California, 403 U.S. 15 (1971), is a landmark decision of the US Supreme Court holding that the First Amendment prevented the conviction of Paul Robert Cohen for the crime of disturbing the peace by wearing a jacket displaying "Fuck the Draft" in the public corridors of a California courthouse.

The Court ruled that displaying a mere four-letter word was not sufficient justification for allowing states to restrict free speech and that free speech can be restricted only under severe circumstances beyond offensiveness. The ruling set a precedent used in future cases concerning the power of states to regulate free speech in order to maintain public civility.

The Court described free expression as a "powerful medicine" in a pluralistic society like the United States. It is intended to "remove government restraints" from public discussion to "produce a more capable citizenry" and preserve individual choices which is imperative for "our political system."

== Background ==
=== Facts of the case ===
On April 26, 1968, 19-year-old Paul Robert Cohen was arrested for wearing a jacket bearing the words "Fuck the Draft" in a corridor of the Los Angeles Hall of Justice. Cohen was reportedly at court to testify as a defense witness in an unrelated hearing, and had removed his jacket on entering the courtroom.

An officer (Note: There were three officers who observed Cohen in the corridor, Sergeants Shore and Swan, and Officer Alexander. Which officer entered the courtroom is not identified.) who had noticed his jacket in the corridor requested that the judge hold Cohen in contempt of court, but the judge did not take any action. The officer then waited until Cohen exited the courtroom and arrested him for disturbing the peace. Cohen claimed that he wore the jacket in an act of protest against the Vietnam War, to inform others of the depth of his feelings. He was convicted of violating section 415 of the California Penal Code, which prohibited "maliciously and willfully disturb[ing] the peace or quiet of any neighborhood or person [by] tumultuous or offensive conduct", and sentenced to 30 days in jail.

=== Lower courts ===
Cohen appealed the conviction to the Appellate Department of the Superior Court, which in a memorandum opinion ruled that "conduct that is merely offensive is insufficient". The State then requested a rehearing, and the Superior Court then added, in a more lengthy opinion, that according to the California Penal Code, offensive conduct must also be tumultuous. The state then appealed to the California Court of Appeal, which upheld the conviction with the claim that "offensive conduct" means "behavior which has a tendency to provoke others to acts of violence or to in turn disturb the peace".

According to the ruling, Cohen had "carefully chose[n] the forum for his views where his conduct would have an effective shock value" and that he should have known that the words on his jacket could have resulted in violent reactions. The California Court of Appeal also stated that Cohen used words that were below the "minimum standard of propriety and the accepted norm of public behavior". The opinion stated that California could determine what language was not suitable for use in public, an expansion of First Amendment jurisprudence. After the California Supreme Court denied review, the U.S. Supreme Court granted a writ of certiorari on June 22, 1970.

== Supreme Court ==
=== Arguments ===
The case was argued by Melville Nimmer, representing Paul Robert Cohen, and Michael T. Sauer, representing California. Anthony G. Amsterdam filed an amicus curiae brief for the American Civil Liberties Union of Northern California, in support of Cohen. At the beginning of oral argument, Chief Justice Warren Burger advised Nimmer that it would not be necessary to "dwell on the facts", effectively stating that Nimmer should not speak the word on the jacket. Seconds later, Nimmer did exactly that, stating that "What this young man did was to walk through a courthouse corridor wearing a jacket on which were inscribed the words, 'Fuck the Draft'." Nimmer believed that if he did not say the word, it would concede that there are some places that certain words cannot be uttered and the case would be lost. Nimmer also distinguished what Cohen did from contempt of court, emphasizing that Cohen did not display the jacket in a courtroom while a court was in session.

Sauer's argument was that the conviction should stand as is, that the very words were offensive conduct by themselves, even when there was no objection by anyone present. Sauer also argued that the violation consisted of both speech and conduct, and that the conduct was not protected speech. Sauer noted that the statute read that it was an offense to "disturb the peace of any neighborhood or person" and that since persons were present that could be offended, Cohen's conviction should be upheld. Sauer did concede that the case turned on the display of the "four-letter word" when pressed on it by Justice Potter Stewart.

=== Opinion ===
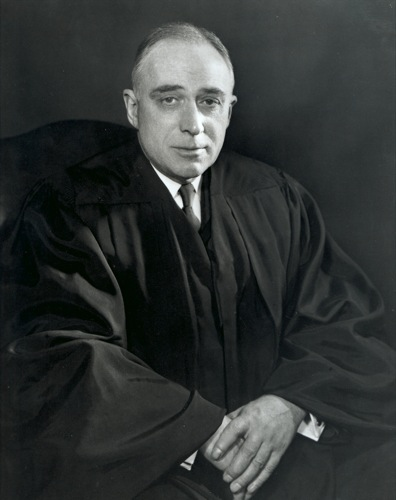
Justice John Harlan wrote the majority opinion in Cohen.

Justice John Harlan announced the decision of the Court, which reversed the appellate court's ruling in a 5–4 decision. First, Justice Harlan's opinion confirmed that the issue with which the Court was dealing consisted of "a conviction resting solely upon 'speech', not upon any separately identifiable conduct" (citation omitted). Because the conviction was based on speech, Justice Harlan stated that the defendant may be criminally punished only if his speech (the words on his jacket) fell within a specific category of speech that is not protected by the First Amendment. The justice then outlined why the word "fuck" did not fall into one of those categories. As Justice Harlan said in the decision, "while the particular four-letter word being litigated here is perhaps more distasteful than most others of its genre, it is nevertheless often true that one man's vulgarity is another's lyric".

=== Blackmun's dissent ===
In a dissenting opinion, Justice Harry Blackmun, joined by Burger and Black, suggested that Cohen's wearing of the jacket in the courthouse was not speech but conduct (an "absurd and immature antic") and therefore not protected by the First Amendment.

The second paragraph of Blackmun's dissent noted that the Supreme Court of California interpreted section 415 in In re Bushman, 1 Cal.3d 767, 463 P.2d 727 (Cal, 1970), which was decided after the Court of Appeal of California's decision in Cohen v. California and the Supreme Court of California's denial of review. The appeal court's ruling was cited in Bushman. Blackmun wrote that the case "ought to be remanded to the California Court of Appeal for reconsideration in the light of the subsequently rendered decision by the State's highest tribunal in Bushman" since the interpretation of section 415 used in the appeal court's ruling may no longer be the authoritative interpretation.

== Subsequent jurisprudence ==
The Cohen ruling has been cited in many subsequent court rulings.

=== National Socialist Party of America v. Village of Skokie ===
National Socialist Party of America v. Village of Skokie was a 1977 United States Supreme Court case. It concerned the constitutionality of an injunction against members of the National Socialist Party of America prohibiting them from holding a march in Skokie, Illinois, which had a large Jewish population. Following that ruling, the Illinois Appellate Court and Illinois Supreme Court cited Cohen v. California in their respective rulings on the case. The ruling in the Illinois Appellate Court found that, while the actions of the Nazi marchers were offensive to Jewish Skokie residents, mere offensiveness was not enough to justify curtailing free speech and assembly. In the Illinois Supreme Court ruling, the opinion states, "[T]he Constitution does not permit government to decide which types of otherwise protected speech are sufficiently offensive to require protection for the unwilling listener or viewer."

=== FCC v. Pacifica Foundation ===
In the Supreme Court case Federal Communications Commission v. Pacifica Foundation (1978), the Court ruled that the commission could regulate broadcasts that were indecent, but not necessarily obscene. In the ruling, the Court stated that while the Cohen ruling disputed that Cohen's speech would offend unwilling viewers, and that no one in the courthouse had actually complained, the commission was responding to a listener's complaint. Furthermore, the ruling noted that the while Cohen was sentenced to 30 days in jail, "even the strongest civil penalty at the commission's command does not include criminal prosecution".

In the dissenting opinion, the ruling cited Cohen to argue that listeners could simply turn the radio off, and therefore offensive speech on the radio did not infringe on people's right to privacy.

=== The State of Washington v. Marc D. Montgomery ===
In State of Washington v. Marc D. Montgomery (1982), 15-year-old Montgomery successfully won an appeal overturning his convictions for disorderly conduct and possession of marijuana on the grounds of free speech. Montgomery was arrested after shouting obscenities, such as "fucking pigs, fucking pig ass hole" at two police officers passing in their patrol car. Citing Cohen v. California, the Court ruled that Montgomery's words could not be classified as fighting words, and restricting speech based merely on its offensiveness would result in a "substantial risk of suppressing ideas in the process".

=== Bethel School District v. Fraser ===
In Supreme Court case Bethel School District v. Fraser (1986), the court ruled that public schools had the right to regulate speech that was indecent, but not necessarily obscene. The Court stated that while adults could not be prohibited from using offensive speech while making a political statement, this protection did not extend to public school students. The ruling cited New Jersey v. T.L.O., arguing that "the constitutional rights of students in public school are not automatically coextensive with the rights of adults in other settings".

=== R.A.V. v. St. Paul ===
R.A.V. v. City of St. Paul was a 1992 United States Supreme Court case which ruled that St. Paul's Bias-Motivated Crime Ordinance was unconstitutional because it discriminated by the content of "fighting words". The Court stated that while the law applied to "fighting words", which are not protected under the First Amendment, it was unconstitutional because it specifically targeted fighting words that "insult or incite violence on the basis of race, religion, or gender". In its ruling, the Court acknowledged that while cross-burning was an abhorrent act, the ordinance was nevertheless void and the defendants could be prosecuted by other means. In his opinion on the ruling, Justice John Paul Stevens cited Cohen in his claim that "we have consistently construed the 'fighting words' exception set forth in Chaplinsky narrowly".

=== Other cases ===
The following is an incomplete list of other court cases that have cited Cohen v. California:

- Gooding v. Wilson, 405 U.S. 518 (1972)
- Lewis v. City of New Orleans, 415 U.S. 130 (1974)
- Collin v. Smith, 578 F.2d 1197 (7th Cir. 1978)
- State of Louisiana v. Meyers, 462 So.2d 227 (1984)
- New Jersey v. T.L.O., 469 U.S. 325 (1985)

== Scholarly response ==
In his critique of the Cohen ruling, Professor R. George Wright wrote that it would be reasonable to expect all speakers to maintain at least a minimum level of decorum in their speech, such that they do not disrespect "substantial numbers of reasonably tolerant people". Wright pushed back on claims made by other scholars that Cohen should not be censored because the word "Fuck" in the phrase "Fuck the Draft" expressed the depth of Cohen's emotion, and instead argued that it is risky to assume that a slogan, "profane or otherwise, is likely to be particularly apt in expressing deep frustrations". He further argued that Cohen's emotions should not be assumed from his willingness to offend. Subsequently, Wright claimed that the effect of speech on the level of public discourse should not be ignored. Legal scholar Archibald Cox similarly argued that the expression, "Fuck the Draft", in the Cohen ruling unnecessarily lowered the standard of public debate. In his retrospective on the ruling, legal scholar Thomas Krattenmaker points out that at the time of the ruling, uttering the word "Fuck" in public, especially in the presence of women, was exceptionally rare, and that it was not unreasonable that Cohen aimed to be offensive in his use of the word. Despite this, Krattenmaker states that the Cohen ruling successfully addresses and disputes arguments that Cohen's speech should not be protected because of the location of the speech, its perceived obscenity, and its potential classification as "fighting words". However, Krattenmaker does argue that governments should perhaps have more power to regulate hurtful speech, and criticizes the Court's treatment of the captive audience problem for providing little direction for future rulings.

Legal scholar William Cohen also noted the limitations of the ruling in providing guidance on whether profanity should still be protected in certain locations or given certain audiences. Cohen argues that because the ruling is "narrowly limited to its facts", it has not been used in future cases pertaining to the regulation of offensive speech, such as FCC v. Pacifica Foundation. As a result, the ruling has been contradicted in future cases that have attempted to interpret the limitations of the First Amendment in specific contexts.

== See also ==
- Mahanoy Area School District v. B.L. (2021), a case involving the use of the word fuck by a student while off campus and outside of school hours
- List of United States Supreme Court cases, volume 403
