= Gilliam v. American Broadcasting Companies, Inc. =

1976 United States court case

- Court: United States Court of Appeals for the Second Circuit
- Full case name: Monty Python v. American Broadcasting Companies, Inc.
- Argued: 13 April 1976
- Decided: 30 June 1976
- Citation: 538 F.2d 14 (2d. Cir. 1976)

Court membership
- Judges sitting: Lumbard, Hays and Gurfein

Case opinions
- The edited version broadcast by ABC impaired the integrity of appellants' work and represented to the public as the product of appellants what was actually a mere caricature of their talents.

Keywords
- copyright infringement

Monty Python v. American Broadcasting Companies, Inc. (2d Cir. 1976) was a case where the British comedy group Monty Python claimed that the American Broadcasting Company (ABC) had violated their copyright and caused damage to their artistic reputation by broadcasting drastically edited versions of several of their shows. An appeals court found in favor of Monty Python, directing a ban of further broadcasts by ABC on the basis of violation of the Lanham Act, which could provide protection in the United States similar to that provided by moral rights in Europe, and gave the opinion that the group's copyright had probably also been infringed.

== Background ==
Monty Python had made a series of half-hour comedy shows for the BBC. The group retained the copyright of the script for each show, with a clearly defined agreement under which the BBC could request certain minimal changes to the script before the show was recorded, but all other rights were reserved to Monty Python. The BBC had the right to license the shows, and had allowed some of the shows to be broadcast in their entirety in the United States, mostly by non-profit public broadcasting networks but in two cases by commercial networks.

The BBC granted a license to Time Life to distribute some of the shows in the United States, and ABC obtained the rights to broadcast the six shows of their final series as two ninety-minute specials. At the request of ABC, Time Life edited the shows to remove 24 minutes of content, in part to create space for advertisements and in part because some of the material was considered by ABC to be unsuitable for American audiences. Monty Python had been reassured that the programs would be broadcast uncut, and did not discover the drastic editing until several weeks after the first broadcast. After trying without success to get ABC to agree not to cut the shows in the second special, they asked the United States District Court for the Southern District of New York to prevent broadcast of the second special and to award damages for the first broadcast.

== District court ruling ==
The district court found that the editing had indeed impaired the integrity of the work, and had caused irreparable damage. That is, some of the people who had seen their mutilated work would not watch further episodes and would not become Monty Python fans. On the other hand, the judge found that if ABC were to withdraw the second special from their program a few days before the date that had been announced in TV schedules, ABC would also suffer damage. Since the ownership of copyright in the shows was not clear, and since the judge felt that Monty Python had been slow to make their complaint, he refused to enjoin ABC from making the second broadcast, but did agree that ABC should broadcast that Monty Python objected to the editing. In the end, a watered-down disclaimer was broadcast saying only that ABC had edited the shows. Monty Python, represented in court by Terry Gilliam and Michael Palin, appealed this ruling.

== Appeals court ruling ==
The United States Court of Appeals for the Second Circuit agreed with the district court judge that irreparable damage had been caused, and said he had been correct in balancing against that the possible damage to ABC from cancellation of the second broadcast. They noted that factor was no longer present, since no further broadcasts had been planned or announced. On the question of copyright, the court found that Monty Python clearly had copyright in the script, and that this carried through into the recordings, which were derivative work using the script under the terms of the agreement. The court referred to Reyher v. Children's Television Workshop (1976) in pointing out that the copyright in the derivative work covered only the novel additions to the underlying work. The agreement did not authorize the BBC to make drastic cuts in the script, so the BBC had no right to authorize Time Life or ABC to make such cuts.

The court reviewed the cut and uncut version of the second broadcast, and found that "the truncated version at times omitted the climax of the skits to which appellants' rare brand of humor was leading and at other times deleted essential elements in the schematic development of a story line." The court dismissed arguments by ABC that Monty Python knew in advance but did not object to the cuts, that the shows were joint work of Monty Python and the BBC, or that the contract allowed such cuts. Monty Python's rights under their contract with the BBC had been violated, and in the end this was the basis of the decision in their favor. The permission granted to broadcast the shows did not confer the right to edit the work, which had not been granted by the copyright holder of the scripts.

The court also discussed at some length other reasons why the cuts might be an "actionable mutilation". Noting that United States law did not include the European concept of droit moral, or moral right, the court also noted that artists had the right of protection against misrepresentation that would damage their ability to earn money, and that courts had therefore used laws related to contracts or unfair competition to provide such protection. The court considered that the Lanham Act §43(a) covered the situation where the network had presented a garbled, distorted version of Monty Python's work, and also found "there is a substantial likelihood that, after a full trial, appellants will succeed in proving infringement of their copyright by ABC's broadcast of edited versions of Monty Python programs." One of the judges concurred with the overall finding, but disagreed about the applicability of the Lanham Act.

== Related law ==
The case has often been presented as the first to discuss false or misleading attribution claims, but in fact the concept has a long pedigree in Anglo-American jurisprudence. In 1816 Lord Byron obtained an injunction from an English court that prevented publication of a book that was said to contain only Byron's poems, but in fact contain some poems by others. By the start of the twentieth century, U.S. laws on unfair competition recognized three related causes of action: for incorrectly attributing another person's work to an author, for failing to give an author credit for their work, and for publishing a version of the work that substantially departs from the original as the author's work. However, the case may be seen as a step towards recognition of moral rights as defined by the Berne Convention for the Protection of Literary and Artistic Works, to which the United States became a signatory in 1989.
