= Richard Maxwell (academic) =

American lawyer

Richard C. Maxwell (October 7, 1919 - October 7, 2016) was Chadwick Professor Emeritus of Law at Duke University. A graduate of Duke and the University of Minnesota Law School, Maxwell was previously Connell Professor and Dean of Law at the University of California, Los Angeles. A struggling institution at the time (1958-1969), he provided the leadership to make the UCLA School of Law a nationally prominent center for legal research and teaching. Over his long career Maxwell has also taught law at Columbia University, the University of Minnesota, the University of California, Berkeley, and the University of Texas. An expert on oil and gas law, he also served as president of the Association of American Law Schools.

Maxwell received the Clyde O. Martz award by the Rocky Mountain Mineral Law Foundation in 1994.

He resided in Durham, North Carolina.
