= Arnstein v. Porter =

- Court: United States Court of Appeals for the Second Circuit
- Full case name: Arnstein v. Porter
- Decided: February 11, 1946

Court membership
- Judges sitting: Jerome Frank, Learned Hand, Charles Edward Clark
- Chief judge: Jerome Frank

Case opinions
- Decision by: Frank
- Majority: Frank, Hand
- Dissent: Clark

Arnstein v. Porter, 154 F.2d 464 (2d Cir. 1946) is a case in the law of copyright in the United States which set a precedent for determining substantial similarity for copyright infringement.

== Facts ==
Ira B. Arnstein, a chronic litigant, sued Cole Porter, a renowned composer, for copyright infringement. Arnstein was a professional songwriter and had published several popular songs. He claimed Porter had plagiarized some of his songs, mainly "The Lord is My Shepherd" and "A Mother's Prayer." Porter rebutted, arguing he had never heard Arnstein's songs and had independently created the songs. Arnstein argued Porter enlisted spies or "stooges" to steal the songs. Porter filed a motion for summary judgment.

The trial court granted Porter's motion for summary judgment. The court had relied on expert testimony about the similarity of the songs and found that Porter's songs were not substantially similar. Arnstein appealed.

== Opinion ==
The appellate court reversed and remanded. The court stated there are two elements to establish infringement: (1) there must be evidence that the defendant had access to the copyrighted work; and (2) there must be evidence that the works are substantially similar.

The primary issue in this appeal was whether the lower court properly deprived the plaintiff of a trial on his copyright infringement action by granting the motion for summary judgment. Regarding the first step, the lower court determined that the plaintiff's claims were "fantastic". However, the key issue was the second step, where there were aspects that were by no means "fantastic"; particularly, the similarity between the works.

Regarding the second step of the infringement analysis, determining substantial similarity is to be done from the view of the "ordinary lay hearer", although "the testimony of experts may be received to aid" this part of the analysis. The plaintiff's legally protected interest is not in his reputation as a musician but his interest in the potential financial returns from his compositions, which derive from the lay public's approbation of his efforts. Accordingly, the question to be answered by this step of the analysis is "whether defendant took from plaintiff's works so much of what is pleasing to the ears of lay listeners, who comprise the audience for whom such popular music is composed, that [the] defendant wrongfully appropriated something which belongs to the plaintiff."

In this case, the appellate court, after listening to the respective compositions, was unable to conclude "that the likenesses are so trifling that, on the issue of misappropriation, a trial judge could legitimately direct a verdict for defendant." Therefore, the court remanded the case to the trial court for a jury trial.
