= Brown Bag Software v. Symantec Corp. =

United States intellectual property law case

Brown Bag Software v. Symantec Corp
- Court: United States Court of Appeals for the Ninth Circuit
- Full case name: Brown Bag Software, a California Corporation, Formerly Telemarketing Resources, Inc. v. Symantec Corp., a California Corporation John L. Friend, an Individual and Dba Softworks Development, 960 F.2d 1465 (9th Cir. 1992)
- Decided: April 7, 1992
- Citations: 960 F. 2d 1465 - Court of Appeals, 9th Circuit 1992

Court membership
- Judges sitting: Joseph Tyree Sneed III, Thomas Tang, David R. Thompson

Keywords
- Copyright Infringement, substantial similarity

Brown Bag Software v. Symantec Corp. is an intellectual property law case in which the United States Court of Appeals for the Ninth Circuit affirmed-in-part and vacated-in-part the previous ruling of the United States District Court for the Northern District of California. Brown Bag Software sued Symantec Corporation and John L. Friend, an individual software developer for Softworks Development, for copyright infringement and several state law claims regarding the similarity of Symantec Corporation's and Brown Bag Software's computer outlining programs.

The District Court rejected Brown Bag Software's copyright infringement claims and the Ninth Circuit Court of Appeals affirmed these rulings. The Ninth Circuit Court of Appeals noted the lack of a decision regarding Brown Bag's state law claims and returned the case back to the District Court for a ruling. The District Court later rejected Brown Bag's state law claims, finalizing all claims in this case.

== Background ==
John L. Friend was an independent computer program developer for Softworks Development. Friend was inspired by Symantec's original ThinkTank outlining program and created his own outlining program called PC-Outline.

In 1987, Friend sold ownership of PC-Outline's intellectual property to Brown Bag Software under two stipulations. First, Friend could not develop a program that would infringe Brown Bag's newly acquired copyright of PC-Outline. Second, Friend had a non-exclusive right to use several pages of PC-Outline's source code.

In the same year, Friend developed and sold another outlining program called GrandView to Symantec. Symantec rebranded this acquisition as an upgrade to its computer outlining programs, ThinkTank and MORE.

On June 8, 1988, Brown Bag Software sued Symantec in federal district court for infringing Brown Bag's copyright and trademark rights. Brown Bag alleged that Symantec and Friend copied several of PC-Outline's features including: basic computer GUI concepts, the idea of an outlining program, the use of pull-down windows, and the color scheme of the program. Furthermore, Brown Bag alleged that Symantec had falsely advertised its GrandView program as an upgrade over Brown Bag's PC-Outline program.

== Court Decision by the Ninth Circuit ==
=== Access of Trade Secrets Divulged in Discovery ===
A protective order was issued on behalf of Symantec Corp to limit Brown Bag's in-house counsel from accessing any trade secrets divulged in discovery. Symantec claimed that access to these trade secrets, which included source code, developmental plans, and beta tester information, were an undue burden. The magistrate issued the order after concluding that Brown Bag's counsel's employment would "necessarily entail advising employers in relating to Symantec's trade secrets".

Brown Bag claimed that the magistrate who issued the order failed to perform a factual inquiry before issuing the protective order. The Court reviewed the records and found that the magistrate had performed comprehensive hearing with both parties before issuing the protective order. The Court made note that the magistrate had also allowed Brown Bag to indirectly interpret the trade secrets deemed "attorneys eyes only" through an independent consultant and ask for unhindered access to any documents it deemed necessary on a document-by-document basis. The Court viewed this as good reason for a protective order, and upheld the magistrate's decision.

=== Copyright Infringement Claim ===
The Court also upheld the district court's summary judgement of the copyright infringement claims in favor of Symantec. From an affidavit written by computer expert Ronald Ogg, the district court identified five groups of features that Brown Bag thought was infringing their copyright:

1. Concepts fundamental to a host of computer programs
2. The idea of an outlining program
3. The use of pull-down windows
4. The color scheme used by PC-Outline
5. The set of features similar to PC-Outline

The Court ruled that the first four groups of features are either unprotectable by copyright law as they were ideas or concepts essential to general outliners, or not substantially similar between the two programs. The Court also agreed with the district court that the set of features posing any resemblance to PC-Outline was due to Friend's right to exercise his non-exclusive license to the source code of PC-Outline.

=== Substantial similarity analysis ===
Brown Bag claimed that the district court did not properly perform legal analysis by using analytical dissection in the intrinsic test for the test of substantial similarity. Although application of "analytical dissection and expert testimony is inappropriate for intrinsic tests," analytical and expert testimony is appropriate for extrinsic tests. The Court rejected Brown Bag's contention, noting that extrinsic tests have expanded to utilize analytical dissection "as a tool for comparing not only ideas but also expression."

The intrinsic test can only be applied to the examination of protectable expression. The Court cites Data East USA, Inc. v. Epyx, Inc. to back this claim, noting that "the source of the similarity must be identified and a determination made as to whether this source is covered by plaintiff's copyright." Instead of using analytical dissection for substantial similarity, the district court used analytical dissection to identify which elements were protectable. The Court deemed the analytical dissection of copyrighted elements necessary to determine the scope of Brown Bag's copyright. The intrinsic tests were performed only after filtering out unprotectable elements and made no use of analytical dissection and expert testimony.

=== Trademark claim ===
The Court believed that the district court attempted to dispose all of Brown Bag's federal claims (copyright and trademark), but the District Court failed to explicitly state a decision regarding the claim that Symantec infringed trademark rights under the Lanham Act. The Court could not make a new ruling and returned the case back to district court for a clarified decision.

== Significance ==
The Ninth Circuit established that analytical dissection could be used for substantial similarity of expression of user interfaces and carefully worded their opinion such that it applies to all subject matters. Furthermore, the Ninth Circuit established that analytical dissection could be used to separate protectable forms of expression from the unprotectable ones. The Ninth Circuit made a clear distinction between the analytical dissection used for the extrinsic tests and the analytical dissection used for copyright analysis.
