= Nimmer on Copyright =

1963 legal treatise on US copyright law

Nimmer on Copyright is a multi-volume legal treatise on United States copyright law that is widely cited in American courts, and has been influential for decades as the leading secondary source on American copyright law.

The work was originally published in 1963 by Melville Nimmer, and was for several decades the only significant treatise in United States copyright law. In 1985, Melville's son David Nimmer took over updates and revisions to Nimmer on Copyright. The work is routinely cited by domestic and foreign courts at all levels in copyright litigation, and within the United States in at least 2500 judicial opinions.

The United States Copyright Office held a special celebration on May 6, 2013, in honor of the 50th anniversary of the publication of Nimmer on Copyright. Similarly, the Copyright Society of the U.S.A. published a special issue of the Journal dedicated to the 50th anniversary, in Winter 2013.

== Notable cases ==
In Bridgeman Art Library v. Corel Corp. the court held that photographs were "writings" within the meaning of the Copyright Clause and cited Nimmer on Copyright, which stated that there "appear to be at least two situations in which a photograph should be denied copyright for lack of originality". Judge Lewis Kaplan considered one of those situations, as described by Nimmer, to be directly relevant, namely that "where a photograph of a photograph or other printed matter is made that amounts to nothing more than slavish copying". A slavish photographic copy of a painting thus, according to Nimmer, lacks originality and thus copyrightability under the U.S. Copyright Act.

One rule that the treatise had proposed, known as the inverse ratio rule, stipulated that a high degree of access would lower the burden of proof for substantial similarity. The rule had initially been endorsed by the Ninth Circuit in Sid & Marty Krofft Television Productions Inc. v. McDonald's Corp. (1977), when the court held that the defendants' prior consultations with the plaintiffs regarding their IP had substantively implicated the former parties in copyright infringement. This doctrine was abrogated in Skidmore v. Led Zeppelin (2020), the Ninth Circuit holding that "the inverse ratio rule, which is not part of the copyright statute ... creates uncertainty for the courts and the parties[.]"
