= Sid & Marty Krofft Television Productions Inc. v. McDonald's Corp. =

1977 copyright infringement lawsuit

- Court: United States Court of Appeals for the Ninth Circuit
- Decided: October 12, 1977
- Citation: 562 F.2d 1157

Court membership
- Judges sitting: James Marshall Carter, Alfred Goodwin, and Joseph Tyree Sneed III

Case opinions
- Extrinsic and intrinsic tests may be used to determine substantial similarity in regards to copyright infringement.
- Majority: Carter
- Concurrence: Sneed
- Concurrence: Goodwin (Carter and Sneed's opinions)
- Concur/dissent: Carter (Sneed's opinion)

Laws applied
- U.S. Const. Art. I § 8, Copyright Act of 1976
- Overruled by
- Skidmore v. Led Zeppelin (2020, inverse ratio rule only)

Keywords
- copyright infringement

Sid & Marty Krofft Television Productions Inc. v. McDonald's Corp. (1977) was a case in which puppeteers and television producers Sid and Marty Krofft alleged that the copyright in their H.R. Pufnstuf children's television program had been infringed by a series of McDonald's "McDonaldland" advertisements. The finding introduced the concepts of extrinsic and intrinsic tests to determine substantial similarity.

== Background ==
Brothers Sid and Marty Krofft had been successfully putting on puppet shows around the country, including Les Poupées de Paris, an adult puppet show. They had created the puppets for Hanna-Barbera's children's TV show The Banana Splits. In 1968, the NBC TV network asked them to create a Saturday morning TV show, and after a year of development the H.R. Pufnstuf program was launched in September 1969. The program includes various puppet characters and a boy named Jimmy who live in a fantasy land called "Living Island". The island has walking trees and books that talk. The show was very successful and generated various spin-off products such as toys, games, comic books, lunch boxes and Kellogg's cereal commercials.

Early in 1970, the advertising agency Needham, Harper and Steers contacted Marty Krofft asking if the Kroffts would be willing to work with Needham on an advertising campaign for the McDonald's hamburger chain based on the H.R. Pufnstuf characters. Various telephone conversations followed to discuss the concept, and on August 31, 1970, Needham sent a letter indicating that the plan was going ahead. Shortly after, however, the agency telephoned to say the campaign had been cancelled.

Needham had in fact, won the contract for the campaign, hired former employees of the Kroffts to work on the sets and costumes, and hired the person who supplied the H.R. Pufnstuf voices to make the voices for several of the McDonaldland commercials, the first of which was broadcast in January 1971.

== District court trial ==
Following launch of the McDonaldland campaign, the Kroffts were unable to license or renew H.R. Pufnstuf spin-off products. The Ice Capades, which had used their characters, even began to use the McDonaldland characters. The Kroffts filed a suit for copyright infringement in September 1971.

The district court began a three-week trial by jury in November 1973. The jury was shown episodes of H.R. Pufnstuf and McDonaldland broadcasts, and examples of merchandise based on the shows and commercials. They were instructed that in finding damages they should not consider McDonald's profits, but could consider the value that McDonald's had gained by using the Kroffts' work. The jury found in favor of the Kroffts and assessed damages at $50,000. Both the plaintiffs and the defendants appealed.

== Appeals court findings ==
The United States Court of Appeals for the Ninth Circuit heard the appeal, publishing its lengthy decision on October 12, 1977.

On the question of infringement, the court quoted Judge Learned Hand's "abstractions test" defined in Nichols v. Universal Pictures Corp.. In this the judge defined successive layers of abstraction from the words themselves, which are subject to copyright, up to the most general statement of ideas, which is not. He said that the point where an expression was subject to copyright lay somewhere in between. To help find where that point was, the court defined extrinsic and intrinsic tests. In the extrinsic test the work would be analysed by an expert to determine similarities in factual aspects including, "the type of artwork involved, the materials used, the subject matter, and the setting for the subject". The intrinsic test would decide whether an "ordinary reasonable person" would consider there were substantial similarities in expression. A jury is well fitted to determine this.

McDonald's character Mayor McCheese (left) and Sid and Marty Krofft's character H.R. Pufnstuf both are fictional mayors that possess disproportionately large round heads.

The court found that both the extrinsic and intrinsic tests showed that there was substantial similarity, rejecting the defendants' detailed list of differences, which the target audience of children would ignore. A footnote said:

Even a dissection of the two works reveals their similarities. The "Living Island" locale of Pufnstuf and "McDonaldland" are both imaginary worlds inhabited by anthropomorphic plants, animals, and other fanciful creatures. The dominant topographical features of the locales are the same: trees, caves, a pond, a road, and a castle. Both works feature a forest with talking trees that have human faces and characteristics. The characters are also similar. Both lands are governed by mayors who have disproportionately large round heads dominated by long wide mouths. They are assisted by "Keystone cop" characters. Both lands feature strikingly similar crazy scientists and a multi-armed evil creature. It seems clear that such similarities go beyond merely that of the idea into the area of expression.

The court also noted that Needham clearly had access to Pufnstuf, since their representatives had visited the Krofft's headquarters to discuss engineering and design work for the commercials even after they had been awarded the McDonald's contract and had decided not to use the Kroffts. This served as part of an endorsement of the inverse ratio rule, proposed in the treatise Nimmer on Copyright. The heuristic stipulated that overwhelming proof of access could lower the burden of proof for substantial similarity, and would remain as binding yet vague precedent in the Ninth Circuit until being explicitly overruled in Skidmore v. Led Zeppelin (2020).

The court rejected the claim that the First Amendment limited the degree to which copyright could be extended to Pufnstuf, saying that other courts had long ago determined that copyright and the First Amendment were compatible, since copyright protected the form of expression only, while the First Amendment protected the right to present the ideas in some other form of expression.

On damages, the court discussed at some length whether the jury should have been instructed to ignore profits. The court felt that a successful plaintiff should be entitled at least to the greater of the damages or profits, and one of the judges felt they should be entitled to the sum of the two. If profits could not be determined accurately, the plaintiff should be entitled to "in lieu" damages. The case was remanded for an accounting, after which the district court could choose to award "in lieu" damages.

== Results ==
Following the remand, the trial court could not decide how much of McDonald's sales had been due to the advertisements, so could not measure the resulting profits. Instead, the court decided to calculate statutory damages using a formula based on the number of copyrights and the number of infringements, treating each commercial or promotional item as a single infringement, rather than each airing of a commercial or each sale of an item as an infringement. This yielded a total award to the Kroffts of $1,044,000.
