= David Nimmer =

American lawyer

- Born: January 14, 1955 (age 71)
- Occupations: Lawyer, Law professor,authority in United States copyright law
- Known for: Nimmer on Copyright

Academic background
- Education: Stanford University; Yale Law School

Academic work
- Discipline: United States copyright law
- Institutions: University of California, Los Angeles Law School; Berkeley Center for Law and Technology

David Nimmer (born January 14, 1955) is an American lawyer, law professor, and authority in United States copyright law.

== Education ==
He received an A.B. with distinction and honors in 1977 from Stanford University and his J.D. in 1980 from Yale Law School, where he served as editor of the Yale Law Journal. David Nimmer is of counsel to Irell & Manella LLP in Los Angeles, California.

== Career ==
Nimmer is an American copyright scholar, practicing attorney, and legal author whose career has combined academic research, appellate-level litigation, and long-term stewardship of one of the most influential treatises in United States intellectual-property law.

Nimmer is a senior lawyer at Irell & Manella LLP, where he practices in copyright and related intellectual-property litigation. His professional work has included appellate advocacy in federal courts, participation in major copyright disputes involving software, digital distribution, and media industries, and advisory work on emerging questions at the intersection of copyright and technology.

Earlier in his career, Nimmer served as an Assistant United States Attorney in the Criminal Division of the United States Attorney's Office, Central District of California, where he handled federal criminal prosecutions.

He subsequently clerked for Judge Warren Ferguson of the United States Court of Appeals for the Ninth Circuit, an experience that strongly shaped his later engagement with appellate copyright doctrine and statutory interpretation.

He also serves as a Professor from Practice at University of California, Los Angeles Law School and Distinguished Scholar at the Berkeley Center for Law and Technology. In 2000, he was elected to the American Law Institute. He has served as a guest professor at the University of Haifa, Yeshiva University (Cardozo Law School), the University of Miami, and Syracuse University.

Nimmer’s academic profile is distinguished by the unusual depth of integration between scholarship and active legal practice. His teaching and writing frequently draw upon contemporary litigation, technological change, and evolving judicial interpretation of the Copyright Act, particularly in areas such as fair use, secondary liability, statutory damages, and digital-rights enforcement.

Nimmer also served as the Chairman on the Committee on Intellectual Properties Litigation for the American Bar Association from 1989-1992.

=== Stewardship of Nimmer on Copyright ===
Nimmer is best known as the long-standing author of Nimmer on Copyright, the leading treatise on United States copyright law. He assumed responsibility for the treatise in the mid-1980s from his father, Melville B. Nimmer, and David Nimmer has overseen continuous updates and revisions from the late 1980s through the present, at which time it spans 11 volumes.

As of 2026, LexisNexis indicates that over 3,500 U.S. judicial opinion have cited Nimmer on Copyright. Courts in many other countries have also relied on this treatise.

Under his direction, the treatise has expanded substantially in scope to address the transformation of copyright law brought about by software markets, networked distribution, and the enactment and interpretation of blockbuster amendments including the Digital Millennium Copyright Act and the Music Modernization ACt.

== Scholarly writing ==
Nimmer has authored an extensive body of legal scholarship addressing the structure and theory of copyright law, with particular emphasis on statutory interpretation, fair use, and the relationship between copyright and technological change.

His major monographs include Copyright Illuminated: Refocusing the Diffuse U.S. Statute and Copyright: Sacred Text, Technology, and the DMCA. These works examine the internal coherence of the Copyright Act, the limits of technology-specific regulation, and the long-term consequences of digital-era legislative reforms.

Across several decades of law-review writing, Nimmer has explored a wide range of doctrinal and theoretical topics, including the development and institutional role of fair-use standards, secondary and vicarious liability in copyright, statutory damages and remedies, the relationship between copyright and contract, international harmonisation of copyright norms, and the interpretive significance of legislative history in technology-focused statutes.

A distinctive feature of Nimmer’s scholarship is its engagement with comparative and historical sources. A significant portion of his work draws on Jewish legal traditions, historical copyright controversies, and comparative copyright systems in Europe and elsewhere.

=== Testimony and lectures ===
In 2014, the Judiciary Committee of the U.S. House of Representatives invited Nimmer to testimony about copyright revision. That congressional testimony followed his previous testimony to the U.S. Senate in 1997 on behalf of the United States Telephone Association and to the House in 1992 on behalf of the National Association of Broadcasters.

The Library of Congress sponsored a forum in 2013 to celebrate the 50th anniversary of the publication of Nimmer on Copyright. He has also delivered lectures in Italian at Università di Trento and at MAXXI in Rome, in French at Université de Montréal and at Université Paris V (René Descartes), and in Spanish (during the pandemic via Zoom) at Universidad Externado de Colombia.

== Awards ==
Nimmer was named the 2010 "Intellectual Property Lawyer of the Year" by the Century City Bar Association. He was selected a Southern California "Super Lawyer" by Los Angeles Magazine in 2006-2010 and has been named in The Best Lawyers in America for over 10 years. The Los Angeles and San Francisco Daily Journals named him one of California's "Top 10 Copyright Lawyers" in 2008. In September 2010, he was named one of "The 25 Most Influential People in IP" in The American Lawyer's Fall 2010 Intellectual Property supplement.
