= Melville B. Nimmer =

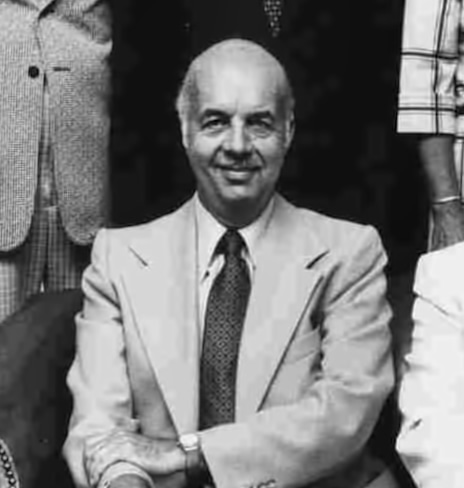
Nimmer at the last meeting of the CONTU working group in 1978

Melville Bernard Nimmer (June 6, 1923 – November 23, 1985) was an American lawyer and law professor, renowned as an expert in freedom of speech and United States copyright law.

Nimmer graduated from UCLA, UC Berkeley, and Harvard Law School. He was admitted to the California State Bar in January 1951. He was professor at the UCLA School of Law from 1962. One year later, he published the two-volume treatise that would become the leading secondary source on copyright law, Nimmer on Copyright. In 1974 he was appointed to the Commission on New Technological Uses of Copyrighted Works (CONTU), a group tasked with determining how US copyright law should treat computer programs. In 1984, he published a one-volume treatise on freedom of speech, titled appropriately Nimmer on Freedom of Speech: Treatise on Theory of the First Amendment.

As a lawyer, he was best known as the winning attorney in the 1971 case Cohen v. California. In Cohen, the Supreme Court of the United States, by a 5–4 vote in an opinion written by Justice Harlan, held that a state cannot criminalize speech absent a "particularized and compelling reason." The Court struck down the conviction of a 19-year-old man who had walked into the Los Angeles courthouse with a jacket reading "Fuck the Draft." Cohen became one of the leading cases interpreting the First Amendment to the United States Constitution protection of freedom of speech.

Melville Nimmer is the father of David Nimmer, himself a legal academic, who has made some revisions to the original version of Nimmer on Copyright.
