= Substantial similarity =

Standard in US copyright law

Substantial similarity, in US copyright law, is the standard used to determine whether a defendant has infringed the reproduction right of a copyright. The standard arises out of the recognition that the exclusive right to make copies of a work would be meaningless if copyright infringement were limited to making only exact and complete reproductions of a work. Many courts also use "substantial similarity" in place of "probative" or "striking similarity" to describe the level of similarity necessary to prove that copying has occurred. A number of tests have been devised by courts to determine substantial similarity. They may rely on expert or lay observation or both and may subjectively judge the feel of a work or critically analyze its elements.

== Substantial similarity in copyright infringement ==
To win a claim of copyright infringement in civil or criminal court, a plaintiff must show he or she owns a valid copyright, the defendant copied the work, and the level of copying amounts to misappropriation. Under the doctrine of substantial similarity, a work can be found to infringe copyright even if the wording of text has been changed or visual or audible elements are altered.

Confusion arises because some courts use "substantial similarity" in two different contexts during a copyright infringement case. In the first context, it refers to that level of similarity sufficient to prove that copying has occurred, once access has been demonstrated. In the second context, it is used after it has been shown that a defendant had copied to determine if what had been copied is legally actionable or amounts to misappropriation. Some courts use "striking" or "probative" instead of "substantial" to describe the level of similarity needed in the first context to avoid confusion. The second meaning, which Judge Jon O. Newman referred to in 1997 as the more proper use, defines "the threshold for determining that the degree of similarity suffices to demonstrate actionable infringement" exists, "after the fact of copying has been established."

=== Striking similarity ===
Direct evidence of actual copying by a defendant rarely exists, so plaintiffs must often resort to indirectly proving copying. Typically, this is done by first showing that the defendant had access to the plaintiff's work and that the degree of similarity between the two works is so striking or substantial that the similarity could only have been caused by copying, and not, for example, through "coincidence, independent creation, or a prior common source". Some courts also use "probative similarity" to describe this standard. This inquiry is a question of fact determined by a jury.

Courts have relied on several factors to aid in a striking similarity analysis. Among these are:

1. Uniqueness, intricacy, or complexity of the similar sections.
2. If the plaintiff's work contains an unexpected or idiosyncratic element that is repeated in the alleged infringing work.
3. The appearance of the same errors or mistakes in both works.
4. Fictitious entries placed by the plaintiff that appear in the defendant's work. For example, fake names or places are often inserted in factual works like maps or directories to serve as proof of copying in a later infringement case since their appearance in a defendant's work cannot be explained away by innocent causes.
5. Obvious or crude attempts to give the appearance of dissimilarity.

Generally, copying cannot be proven without some evidence of access; however, in the seminal case on striking similarity, Arnstein v. Porter, the Second Circuit stated that even absent a finding of access, copying can be established when the similarities between two works are "so striking as to preclude the possibility that the plaintiff and defendant independently arrived at the same result."

=== Misappropriation ===
Substantial similarity is the term used by all courts to describe, once copying has been established, the threshold where that copying wrongfully appropriates the plaintiff's protected expression. It is found when similarity between the copyrightable elements of two works rises above the de minimis exception, reaching a threshold that is "substantial" both qualitatively and quantitatively. While actionable infringement is more likely to be found where greater levels of similarity exist, substantial similarity has also been found where the portion copied was small but constituted the "heart" of the work. In determining whether use is substantial, courts look not only at the proportion of duplication in comparison to the relative size of the works, but also to such considerations as the creativity of the copied material, its use in both works and its centrality to either. Only when a work rises to a level of "substantial similarity" does it infringe to the point of being legally actionable. As there is no clear line on how much duplication is necessary to reach "substantial similarity", the question is determined on a case-by-case evaluation. A showing that features of the two works are not similar does not bar a finding of substantial similarity, if such similarity as does exist clears the de minimis threshold.

The substantial similarity standard is used for all kinds of copyrighted subject matter: books, photographs, plays, music, software, etc. It may also cross media, as in Rogers v. Koons, where a sculptor was found to have infringed on a photograph.

Substantial similarity is a question of fact that is decided by a jury. In situations where "reasonable minds could not differ" in the opinion that substantial similarity of expression does not exist, a court may make summary judgment for the defendant, closing a case without finding infringement. Since "substantial similarity" can require careful evaluation, however, infringement cases usually lead to full inquiry with appropriate tests developed by the courts.

== Tests ==
A number of tests have been devised to determine substantial similarity. These may rely one or both of expert or lay observation and may subjectively judge the feel of a work or critically analyze its elements.

Noted copyright authority Melville Nimmer describes two different tests for substantial similarity, "fragmented literal similarity" and "comprehensive non-literal similarity", which have been widely adopted and utilized by U.S. courts. Either test may result in a finding of infringement. Fragmented literal similarity occurs when fragmented copyrightable elements are copied from a protected work in a manner not allowed by fair use. It is more limited than comprehensive copying, involving briefer elements such as a stanza of a song or an image. Comprehensive non-literal similarity may occur even in the absence of verbatim duplication of copyrighted elements when, in the words of J. Thomas McCarthy's McCarthy's Desk Encyclopedia of Intellectual Property, one work appropriates "the fundamental structure or pattern" of another. Judge John M. Walker, Jr. of the U.S. Court of Appeals for the Second Circuit noted in Arica v. Palmer that a court may find copyright infringement under the doctrine of "comprehensive non-literal similarity" if "the pattern or sequence of the two works is similar".

The various other tests devised to determine substantial similarity can essentially be broken down into two categories: those that rely on the impressions of ordinary observers and those that rely on "dissection" by experts. Some tests combine elements of both. Ordinary observer tests rely on the subjective response that an ordinary person forms on comparing two works as to whether substantial similarity exists. These have been criticized as unreliable in that ordinary observers may not have enough familiarity with copyright concepts to recognize those elements not copyrightable, such as idea, and might also not recognize where superficial alterations fail to efface infringement. By contrast, dissection tests seek infringement only in those specific copyrightable elements within a work. The tester in these cases considers factors like the idea-expression divide and the scènes à faire doctrine.

=== Total concept and feel test ===
The total concept and feel test relies on the subjective evaluation of observers who consider the question of whether the total concept and feel of one work is substantially similar to another. The idea of "total concept and feel" was introduced in Roth Greeting Cards v. United Card Co (1970). The test is subdivided into the "extrinsic test", wherein a complex analysis is conducted of the concepts underlying the work, and the "intrinsic test", wherein within the judgment of an ordinary person the expression of the works are compared. The differences between the two were defined in 1977 by United States federal judge James Marshall Carter in Sid & Marty Krofft Television Productions, Inc. v. McDonald's Corp.:

[The extrinsic test] is extrinsic because it depends not on the responses of the trier of fact, but on specific criteria that can be listed and analyzed. Such criteria include the type of artwork involved, the materials used, the subject matter, and the setting for the subject. Since it is an extrinsic test, analytic dissection and expert testimony are appropriate. Moreover, this question may often be decided as a matter of law. The determination of when there is substantial similarity between the forms of expression is necessarily more subtle and complex. As Judge Hand candidly observed, "Obviously, no principle can be stated as to when an imitator has gone beyond copying the 'idea,' and has borrowed its 'expression.' Decisions must therefore inevitably be ad hoc." Peter Pan Fabrics, Inc. v. Martin Weiner Corp., 274 F.2d 487, 489 (2 Cir. 1960). If there is substantial similarity in ideas, then the trier of fact must decide whether there is substantial similarity in the expressions of the ideas so as to constitute infringement. The test to be applied in determining whether there is substantial similarity in expressions shall be labeled an intrinsic one depending on the response of the ordinary reasonable person. See International Luggage Registry v. Avery Products Corp., supra, 541 F.2d at 831; Harold Lloyd Corp. v. Witwer, 65 F.2d 1, 18–19 (9 Cir. 1933). See generally Nimmer § 143.5. It is intrinsic because it does not depend on the type of external criteria and analysis that marks the extrinsic test.... Because this is an intrinsic test, analytic dissection and expert testimony are not appropriate.

This test was utilized in BSS Studio, Inc. v. Kmart Corporation in 1999 in determining that a line of Halloween masks produced by Kmart infringed in "total concept and feel" on a line of masks produced by BSS. Particularly the intrinsic test has met criticism as extending copyright beyond the protection of expression into the protection of ideas.

In Brown Bag Software v. Symantec Corp, the Ninth Circuit expanded the extrinsic test to include the analysis expression as well as ideas. The Court found that analytical dissection of expression was necessary to identify expressions for comparison in the intrinsic test.

=== Pattern test ===
The pattern test created by Columbia University professor Zechariah Chafee is primarily utilized to test fiction, comparing elements of plot and character between two works to see if substantial similarity exists. The more similarities exist between the two, the more likely the court will determine infringement.

=== Abstraction–filtration–comparison test ===
The primary test utilized in comparing computer programs, the "abstraction–filtration–comparison test" is also called more simply the "filtration test". The test, which was devised by the U.S. Court of Appeals for the Second Circuit for Computer Associates International, Inc. v. Altai, Inc., compares the elements of software at increasing levels of abstraction, from machine instructions to program function, excluding those elements not copyrightable, such as those approaches dictated by efficiency or the fundamental operation of computers, to evaluate similarity.

== Inverse ratio rule ==
The inverse ratio rule is a controversial heuristic proposed in Nimmer on Copyright that has at times been accepted by a few of the Circuit Courts, notably within the Ninth Circuit which deals with many of the cases of the entertainment industry since it covers California. The inverse ratio rule holds that the more an alleged infringer had access to a work, the lower the threshold for establishing substantial similarity. In Skidmore v. Led Zeppelin, a 2020 lawsuit involving the Led Zeppelin song "Stairway to Heaven", the Ninth Circuit abrogated its prior endorsement of the inverse ratio rule.

The rule was enshrined by Ninth in Sid & Marty Krofft Television Productions Inc. v. McDonald's Corp. (1977), in which McDonald's was found infringing on the characters created by the Kroffts as the Kroffts had shown that the firm that created the McDonald's characters had been in earlier discussions with the Kroffts, thus proving access and lowering the bar on similarity. Other Circuits have formally rejected the rule, and no case on the rule has been heard at the Supreme Court.

The inverse ratio rule has been frequently used in several entertainment-based lawsuits when it is difficult to prove substantial similarity, which had made it a point of concern since the burden of access is much easier to satisfy and can make nearly any similarity easy to show. Two recent cases signaled changes in the Ninth's attitude towards the inverse ratio rule: the suit of Marvin Gaye's estate over "Blurred Lines" by Robin Thicke, and the suit brought by a trust for the band Spirit over Led Zeppelin's "Stairway to Heaven". In the first case, a jury found for Gaye's estate on the similarity of "Got to Give It Up", both with substantial similarity and on the inverse ratio rule. While the three-judge Ninth Circuit panel agreed, on an en banc hearing, the full Ninth Circuit concurred with all but the inverse ratio rule. In the "Stairway to Heaven" case, the trust accused Led Zeppelin of copying Spirit's "Taurus". A jury found there was no substantial similarity, and the case was appealed to the Ninth Circuit, with specific instructions asking on ruling on the inverse ratio rule. On the en banc appeal in 2020, the Ninth Circuit specifically took the time to overturn its stance on the inverse ratio rule "Because the inverse ratio rule, which is not part of the copyright statute, defies logic, and creates uncertainty for the courts and the parties, we take this opportunity to abrogate the rule in the Ninth Circuit and overrule our prior cases to the contrary." The Supreme Court denied to hear the challenge to the case, leaving the Ninth Circuit's new stance to ignore the inverse ratio rule as case law in future copyright cases within the jurisdiction.

== See also ==
- Derivative work
- Idea-expression divide
