= My First Alphabet =

1981 educational video game

- Atari, Inc. version
- Developer: Fernando Herrera
- Publishers: Atari Program Exchange; Atari, Inc.
- Designer: Fernando Herrera
- Platform: Atari 8-bit
- Release: 1981
- Genre: Educational
- Mode: Single-player

My First Alphabet is an educational video game for Atari 8-bit computers. It was designed and programmed by Fernando Herrera and published by the Atari Program Exchange in 1981. My First Alphabet won the first Atari Star Award, an annual recognition of the best APX submission. It was moved to Atari, Inc.'s product line. The award led to the creation of First Star Software and a string of games from Herrera.

== Development ==
Pressing the A key displays things that start with that letter.

Herrera's son, Steve, was born with severe cataracts and was pronounced blind by medical specialists. Refusing to place his son in remedial classes, Herrera wrote a program to help his son learn the alphabet. After several months, his son made rapid progress, overcoming his handicap. The program later evolved into My First Alphabet.

== Reception ==
When Atari began recognizing the top APX submissions in 1981, My First Alphabet was the first Atari Star Award winner, including a $25,000 prize. Herrera used the money to found First Star Software. Herrerra wrote First Star's initial title, Astro Chase (1982), as well as Bristles (1983). First Star was the publisher of Boulder Dash (1984) and Spy vs. Spy (1984).

InfoWorld's Essential Guide to Atari Computers recommended the game among educational software for the Atari 8-bit.
