= Superman: The Man of Steel (1989 video game) =

- Acorn Electron cover art
- Developer: Tynesoft
- Publishers: Tynesoft (Europe); First Star Software (US)
- Platforms: Acorn Electron, Amiga, Amstrad CPC, Atari ST, BBC Micro, Commodore 64, MSX, PC, ZX Spectrum
- Release: 1989
- Genre: Action-adventure
- Mode: Single-player

Superman: The Man of Steel is a 1989 video game featuring the DC Comics character Superman. It was developed and published by UK software company Tynesoft under license from First Star Software.

== Gameplay ==
In game shot of the opening pseudo-3D flying level (Amiga).

In game shot of a side-scrolling level set inside the satellite (C64).

The game is split into distinct levels including 3D flying, overhead vertical scrolling and side scrolling sections. The number of sections depended on format (e.g. part seven is missing from some versions). Sections are linked by comic book graphics telling the story.

The first level is a pseudo-3D forward scrolling flying level (similar to Space Harrier) where Superman, en route from Metropolis to S.T.A.R. Labs, is attacked by Parademons.

Part two is set on a ship where Lois Lane is being held hostage by terrorists. This takes the form of a side scrolling fighting game with Superman fighting off terrorists to reach and free Lois.

The third part is an overhead view vertical scrolling section set in space where Superman must escort a Space Shuttle, manned by Professor Gorwin, through an asteroid and Kryptonite field, to the S.T.A.R. Lab Satellite.

The fourth is another side-scrolling level. Set inside the satellite, Superman must battle the faulty Robot Defence System which has mistaken Superman for an enemy intruder.

The fifth part is set outside the satellite when another asteroid field approaches. Gameplay is identical to level three.

Part six is similar to parts three and five but rather than asteroids, Superman must fly to an enemy satellite which is disrupting the signals from the S.T.A.R. Lab Satellite. On the way, he must battle Darkseid's Mini-Robots and a large boss robot.

Part seven is set outside the enemy satellite, now identified as belonging to Lex Luthor. Superman uses telescopic sight to identify and attack weak spots while avoiding the satellite's defences.

The eighth and final part is set inside Luthor's satellite. Similar to part four, Superman must battle defence robots in a side-scrolling level. The object of the game is to destroy the 'geo-disruptor' found at the end of the level.

== History and release ==
Tynesoft had ported and published First Star's Boulder Dash and Spy vs. Spy for Acorn platforms in the UK and were looking for other licenses. First Star held the home computer rights to Superman (which they had used for Superman: The Game). Tynesoft developed an entirely new game on as many different computers as possible. Versions were released for most home computer platforms of the day including Atari ST, Amiga, PC, Commodore 64, ZX Spectrum, Amstrad CPC, MSX, BBC Micro and Acorn Electron. It is claimed a version for the Apple II was also created for the US market, but there has been no evidence it was ever published or released. The game was published by First Star in the US and distributed by Capstone Software. Important information : The Master System version of the 1992 Superman game is also called "Man of Steel" but has nothing to do with the 1989 game.

== Critical reaction ==
The 16-bit versions generally received moderately favourable reviews. The One praised the game's incorporation of the style of the comic book source but found gameplay to be frustrating, particularly having to play the sub games in sequence. It gave a score of 69% for the Amiga version and 66% for the Atari ST version. Amiga Computing similarly praised the look of the game while also pointing out the "top notch" sound, awarding an overall score of 62%.

Reception of the 8-bit versions of the game was mixed. While still praising the presentation and graphics, Zzap!64 gave the C64 version an overall score of 39%, complaining of the lightweight nature of the sub games and the "tedious" multi-load. This was a particular problem when loading from tape as there was a lengthy load between each level and to start a new game, the tape would need to be rewound to the correct position for the first level. Crash gave the Spectrum version 35% with praise only being given to the sound. Even the graphics in this version came in for criticism including the "matchstick figure" representing Superman in the sideways scrolling section. Electron User was much more positive about the Acorn Electron version, giving an overall score of 8/10, but still criticised the multi-load and the frustrating gameplay.
