= Mister Cool =

Mister Cool, Mr. Cool, or Mr Cool may refer to:

== Nicknames and pseudonyms ==
- Mister Cool, nickname for Ibrahim El Bouni, an MMA fighter; see List of current ONE fighters
- Mister Cool, nickname for Sam Farha, professional poker player
- Mr. Cool, nickname for Elwood Glover, Canadian broadcaster and musician
- Mister Cool, alias for Randy Herdian, a bad singer on I Can See Your Voice Indonesia season 3
- Mr. Cool, stage name for Jason Koenig, member of the band Kentucky Knife Fight
- Mr. Cool, stage name for Antero Manninen, musician
- Mr. Cool, nickname for Jimmy Mariano, Filipino basketball player
- Mr. Cool, nickname for Shukor Salleh, Malaysian footballer

== Animals ==
- Mister Cool, a medal-winning horse in equestrian for Ireland at the 2012 Summer Paralympics.
- Mr Cool, a race-winning racehorse sired by Jupiter Island

== Characters ==
- Mr. Cool (Mr. Men), a character from the children's literature series Mr. Men
- Mr. Cool, a character from the 1958 UK novel Absolute Beginners
  - Mr Cool, a character from the 1986 British film Absolute Beginners
- Mr. Cool, an anthropomorphic dog from the animated TV show The Fonz and the Happy Days Gang
- Mr. Cool, a guest character from the animated TV show Wow! Wow! Wubbzy!
- Mr. Cool, a nickname for Kwamé Asiedu, a character in the 2000s British TV show Rock School
- Mr. Cool, a nickname for Lawrence, a character in the 2003 U.S. film School of Rock
- Mr Cool, a character from the 2016 Hong Kong film Buddy Cops
- Mr. Cool, a 2010s advertising character used by e-cigarette maker blu; see Electronic cigarette and e-cigarette liquid marketing

== Music ==
=== Albums ===
- Mr. Cool, alternative title for Still Crazy, a 1981 album by Crazy Cavan 'n' the Rhythm Rockers
- Mr.Cool, a 2003 album by Louis Koo

=== Songs ===
- "Mr. Cool" (Kevin Ayers song), 1977
- "Mr. Cool", a 1963 song by The Champs
- "Mr Cool", a 1975 song by Sweet Sensation
- "Mr Cool", a 1970s single by Killer Kane and Blackie Lawless
- "Mr. Cool", a 1981 song by Carroll Thompson, from the album Hopelessly in Love
- "Mr. Cool", a 1984 song by Vixen, from the Hardbodies soundtrack
- "Mr. Cool", a song by Sykotik Sinfoney, from the Bad Channels soundtrack
- "Mr. Cool", a 1996 song by Eg White, from the album Turn Me On, I'm a Rocket Man
- "Mr. Cool", a 1997 song by Ill Gotten Gains, found on the 2003 compilation album Grand Central Vol. 2
- "Mister Cool", a 2004 song by Snook, from the album Vi vet inte vart vi ska men vi ska komma dit
- "Mr. Cool", a 2004 song by Tamia featuring Mario Winans, from the album More
- "Mr. Cool", a 2006 song by Jim Jones, from the album Hustler's P.O.M.E. (Product of My Environment)

== Other uses ==
- Mr. Cool (book), by Roger Hargreaves and illustrated by Adam Hargreaves, part of the Mr. Men series, 2003
- Mr. Cool (video game), 1983
- Mr Cool, a short film collected in the 1999 film anthology Tube Tales
- "Mr. Cool", an episode of the television show Silver Spoons
- "Mr. Cool", an episode of the television show Pawn Stars

== See also ==
- Mister (disambiguation)
- Cool (disambiguation)
  - Cool (surname)
- Kool (surname)
- MR (disambiguation)
- Evaporative cooler, or mister
