= Spy vs. Spy (disambiguation) =

Spy vs. Spy is a wordless black and white comic strip published in Mad magazine since 1961.

Spy vs. Spy may also refer to:

- Spy vs. Spy (1984 video game), the first computer game based on the comic strip
- Spy vs Spy (1999 video game), a game released on Game Boy Color by Kotobuki System Co., Ltd.
- Spy vs. Spy (2005 video game)
- Spy vs Spy (album), the 1989 recording of Ornette Coleman compositions by American multi-instrumentalist, John Zorn
- Spy vs. Spy (band), Australian rock band
- English songwriter Billy Bragg in his 1983 Life's a Riot with Spy vs Spy.
