= Kool (surname) =

Kool is a Dutch patronymic surname. Kool (Dutch pronunciation: [koːl]) is an archaic short form of the given name Nicolaas. Since "kool" means both "cabbage" and "coal" in modern Dutch, for some families the name could conceivably have originated as a metonymic occupational surname, referring to a cabbage farmer or seller, or coal worker. Among variant forms are Coolen, Cools, Koole, Koolen and Kools. People with the surname include:

- Charlotte Kool (born 1999), Dutch professional racing cyclist
- Corien Kool (born 1959), Dutch CDA politician (married name: Corien Wortmann)
- David Kool (born 1987), American college basketball player and coach
- Eric Kool (born 1960), American biochemist
- Molly Kool (1916–2009), North America's first registered female sea captain
- Noah Kool (born 1962), Papua New Guinean politician
- Ruud Kool (born 1969), Dutch football midfielder
- Willem Gillisz Kool (1608–1666), Dutch landscape painter

Koole

- Ricky Koole (born 1972), Dutch singer and film actress
- Ruud Koole (born 1953), Dutch political scientist and Labour Party chair 2001–05

Kools

- Cor Kools (1907–1985), Dutch football midfielder and manager
- Mark Fidel Kools (born 1971), US Army soldier on death row for fragging

== See also ==
- Kool (disambiguation)
- Cool (disambiguation)
