= Boulder Dash-XL =

2011 video game

- Developers: Catnip Games (360, Win); Ludosity (3DS); HeroCraft (iOS)
- Publishers: Kalypso Media / First Star Software (360, Win); Reef Entertainment (3DS); First Star Software (iOS)
- Designer: Daniel Remar (3DS)
- Platforms: Xbox 360, Windows, Nintendo 3DS, iOS
- Release: July 13, 2011: July 13, 2011 (360) 2011 (Win); EU: October 5, 2012 (3DS) November 20, 2012 (iOS); NA: September 5, 2013 (3DS)
- Genre: Action-puzzle
- Mode: Single-player

Boulder Dash-XL is an action-puzzle video game developed by Catnip Games and published by Kalypso Media for the Xbox 360 (XBLA) in July 2011. It is part of the Boulder Dash series. A PC version was released later in 2011. A Nintendo 3DS and iOS ports were released in 2012. The 3DS port is known as Boulder Dash-XL 3D.

== Gameplay ==
The objective of the game is to burrow through tunnels collecting gems without causing rocks to crush the player character. The game has over 150 levels and five game modes: Arcade, Zen, Puzzle, Retro, and Score.

== Development ==
The Nintendo 3DS version of the game was developed by Ludosity, with lead designer Daniel Remar having been a fan of the Boulder Dash series. It was developed in a six-month span along with Alien Chaos 3D.

== Release ==
Boulder Dash-XL was developed by Catnip Games, based in Germany. Developers previously worked on Boulder Dash: Rocks! from 2007. The game was released on July 13, 2011, for Xbox 360 and later for PC the same year. A mobile version (which was originally scheduled to be released for Android, Windows Phone and iOS in 2011), was released on November 20, 2012, for iOS. It was published for Nintendo 3DS on October 5, 2012, in Europe, and was later released on the Nintendo 3DS eShop on August 22 and September 5, 2013, respectively.

== Reception ==
Reception

Aggregate score
Aggregator	Score
Metacritic	71/100 (360); 70/100 (3DS)

Review scores
Publication	Score
Eurogamer	8/10 (360)
GameSpot	7.0/10 (360)
IGN	8.0/10 (360)
MeriStation	8/10 (360)
Nintendo Life	7/10 (3DS)
Pocket Gamer	3.5/5 (3DS)
AppSpy	3/5 (iOS)
Gamereactor	7/10 (360)
Vandal	8/10 (360)

Boulder Dash-XL received "mixed or average" reviews according to review aggregator website Metacritic.

GameSpot said: "Boulder Dash-XL is great when it sticks close to the original Boulder Dash formula, but an apparent focus on quantity rather than quality hurts the experience". IGN called the game "simple and fun" but said that "the visuals and sound don't deliver on the same level as the gameplay". GamePro called the game "an enjoyable ride that's well worth your time".
