= Cooling (surname) =

Cooling is an English surname. One origin of the name is as a variant of the surname Culling. The other origin is as a name given to people from Cooling, Kent. Notable people with the surname include:

- Jeff Cooling (born 1987), American politician
- Joyce Cooling (born 1969), American jazz guitarist, vocalist and songwriter
- Robert Cooling (born 1957), Royal Navy officer
- Roy Cooling (1921–2003), English footballer
- Sonia Couling (born 1974), Thai model, actress, television personality

== See also ==
- Cool (surname)
- Cools (surname)
- McCool (surname)
