= Cool =

Cool commonly refers to:

- Cool, moderately cold temperature
- Cool (aesthetic), an aesthetic of attitude, behavior, and style

Cool or COOL may also refer to:

== People ==
- Cool (producer), American hip hop producer
- Cool Wakushima (born 2002), New Zealand snowboarder
- Fabien Cool (born 1972), French footballer
- Kenton Cool (born 1973), English mountain climber
- Phil Cool (born 1948), English impressionist
- Tré Cool (born 1972), American drummer (Green Day)
- LL Cool J (born 1968), American rapper

== Economics ==
- Country of origin labelling
- mCOOL - US consumer legislation to enforce COOL at the grocery store

== Computing ==
- COOL, a computer language used in the CLIPS tool
- Cool, an internal name of C#
- An abbreviation for Collabora Online

== Geography ==
- Cool, Rotterdam, Netherlands
- Cool, California, U.S.
- Cool, Texas, U.S.

== Arts and entertainment ==
=== Music ===
- Cool (band), a South Korean K-pop music group
- Cool jazz

==== Albums ====
- Cool (George Duke album) (2000)
- Lupe Fiasco's The Cool (2007)
  - The Cool (character), the associated concept character
- Cool (Joyce album) (2015)

==== Songs ====
- "Cool" (Alesso song), 2015
- "Cool" (Anthony Hamilton song), 2008
- "Cool" (Jonas Brothers song), 2019
- "Cool" (Le Youth song), 2013
- "Cool" (Dua Lipa song), 2020
- "Cool" (Soccer Mommy song), 2018
- "Cool" (Gwen Stefani song), 2005
- "Cool" (The Time song), 1981
- "Cool" (West Side Story song), 1957
- "Cool", a 2011 song by Jason Blaine from Life So Far
- "Cool", a 2018 song by Felix Jaehn, featuring Marc E. Bassy and Gucci Mane, from I (Felix Jaehn album)
- "Cool", a 2020 song by Weki Meki from New Rules
- "Cool", a 2020 song by Bvndit
- "Cool", a 2024 song by Gracie Abrams from The Secret of Us (Deluxe)

=== Other media ===
- "Cool" (Smallville), an episode of Smallville
- CoolTV, a Canadian television channel
- Cool TV, a Hungarian television channel
- KBS Cool FM, a South Korean radio station
- COOL Award, children's book choice award
- Cool colors, a perceptual and psychological classification of colors
- Majesco' NASDAQ ticker symbol
- Mr. Cool (Mr. Men), a fictional character in the Mr. Men children's book series
- Steve McQueen: popularly known as "The King of Cool"

== Other uses ==
- Cool pavement, road surface that uses additives to reflect solar radiation unlike conventional dark pavement

== See also ==
- Cool Change (disambiguation)
- Cool Kids (disambiguation)
- Mister Cool (disambiguation)
- Cooling (disambiguation)

=== Words and names pronounced the same or similarly ===
- Kool (disambiguation)
- Kewl (disambiguation)
- Cumhall (Irish pronunciation: [kuːl̪ˠ]), a figure in Irish mythology
- Cruel (disambiguation)
