= Richard Spitalny =

American film producer

Richard Spitalny is an American film producer and the founder of First Star Software.

He co-produced Rhinestone, starring Dolly Parton and Sylvester Stallone, for 20th Century Fox as well as other films, prior to 1982.

As the president of First Star Software, he was responsible for the sale of part of the company to Warner Software (a Warner Communications Company) in 1983. Although Warner no longer maintains ownership equity, the companies continue to work together in the exploitation of the three Spy vs. Spy computer games created by First Star based on Mad‘s Spy vs. Spy characters. Spitalny was also responsible for the acquisition of Boulder Dash and continues to oversee all production, distribution, marketing and/or licensing of games based on this intellectual property throughout the world.
