= Spy vs. Spy III: Arctic Antics =

1986 video game

- Developer: First Star Software
- Publishers: Epyx (US), Databyte (UK), Hi-Tec Software (UK budget reissue)
- Platforms: Amiga, Amstrad CPC, Apple II, Atari 8-bit, Atari ST, Commodore 64, MS-DOS, ZX Spectrum
- Release: 1986
- Modes: Single-player, multiplayer

Spy vs. Spy III: Arctic Antics is the third game in the Spy vs. Spy series. The game was developed by First Star Software.

== Gameplay ==
Gameplay screenshot

Spy vs. Spy III: Arctic Antics switches the location from a tropical island to the arctic. The spies fight by throwing snowballs at each other and setting traps, which decreases their body heat bar. Tools include a saw to cut holes in the ice for the second player to fall into. Lost body heat can be restored by moving into a heated igloo.

== Reception ==
Matthew J.W. Ratcliff for ANALOG Computing said "First Star Software has done an excellent job of bring the Mad Magazine classic Spy vs. Spy comics to life in Arctic Antics."

Ervin Bobo for Compute!'s Gazette said "As a new grouping, Maxx-Out is off to a good start with its initial selection."

Bill Scolding for Commodore User said "Arctic Antics is by far and away the weakest of the three Spy games and you might wonder just how much longer the First Star programming team can get away with churning out what are essentially very similar games."

Paul Rixon for Page 6 said "If you're a fan of the previous Spy vs Spy titles you will be overjoyed with Arctic Antics since it has all the charm, challenge, fun and addictiveness of its predecessors."
