= Boulder Dash II =

1985 video game

- Publisher: First Star Software
- Designer: Peter Liepa
- Platforms: Atari 8-bit, Commodore 64, IBM PC, MSX, ZX Spectrum
- Release: 1985
- Genres: Puzzle, maze

Boulder Dash II is a 2D maze-puzzle video game designed by Peter Liepa and released in 1985 by First Star Software. It is the first sequel to the original Boulder Dash.

== Release ==
Boulder Dash II was published under several titles; Rockford's Riot on the MSX, Rockford's Revenge on the Commodore 64. The second release in Japan was titled Champion Boulder Dash, but it is not a port of the western game.

Super Boulder Dash (1986 – Apple II, C64, MS-DOS) was a compilation of Boulder Dash and Boulder Dash II published by Electronic Arts.

== Reception ==
Paul Rixon for Page 6 said that "the majority of Atarians will already have the Boulderdash duo in their collections, but if it's missing from yours then you ought to make amends as soon as possible". J. Mark Hunter for The Australian Commodore and Amiga Review said: "It's good. That's undeniable. It is one of my personal favourites due to its teasing action and glittering end results. The diamonds we all wish could be our best fried". Zzap! said that "despite the extra complexities, it doesn't seem any harder overall – indeed, experienced Boulder Dash players may be able to plough straight through level one at virtually the first attempt. The higher levels are another matter". Crash said: "I expected Rockford's Riot to be a step forward from Boulder Dash, but it's really just a step sideways. Admittedly, there a few new features, but for all intents and purposes Rockfords Riot is a souped-up Boulder Dash". Clare Edgeley for Sinclair User said that "Rockford's Riot is packaged – in a ludicrous vertical box crowned by a luminous disc – with Boulder Dash, so you can see exactly how similar both games are". Craig Grannell for the 2012 Sinclair ZX Spectrum And Commodore 64 Book wrote that "Rockford's Revenge provided gamer with a new set of Liepa-designed caves, but little else".
