= Cornelis Beelt =

Dutch Golden Age landscape painter

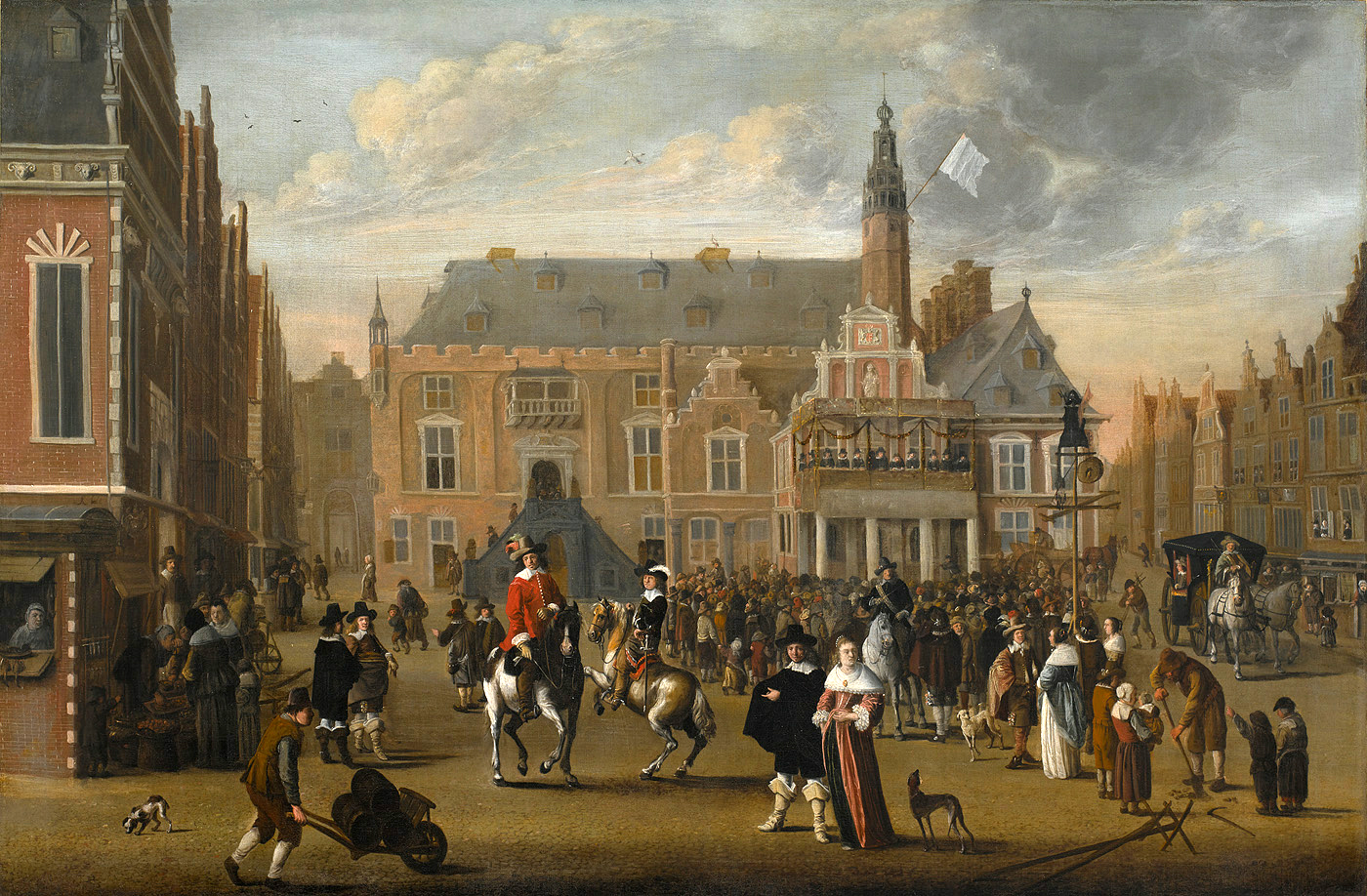
Grote Markt of Haarlem, c. 1670-90, by Cornelis Beelt

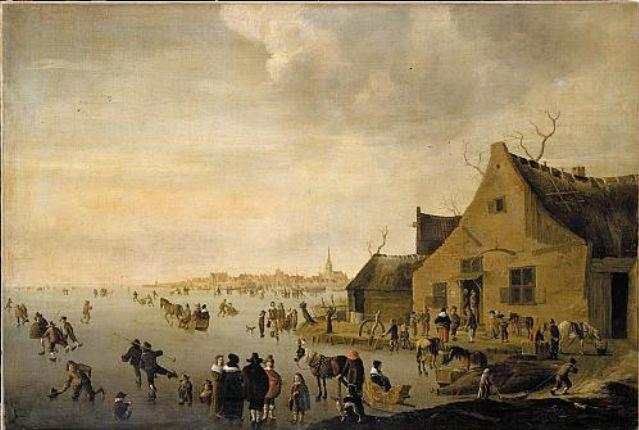
Winter landscape with ice skaters

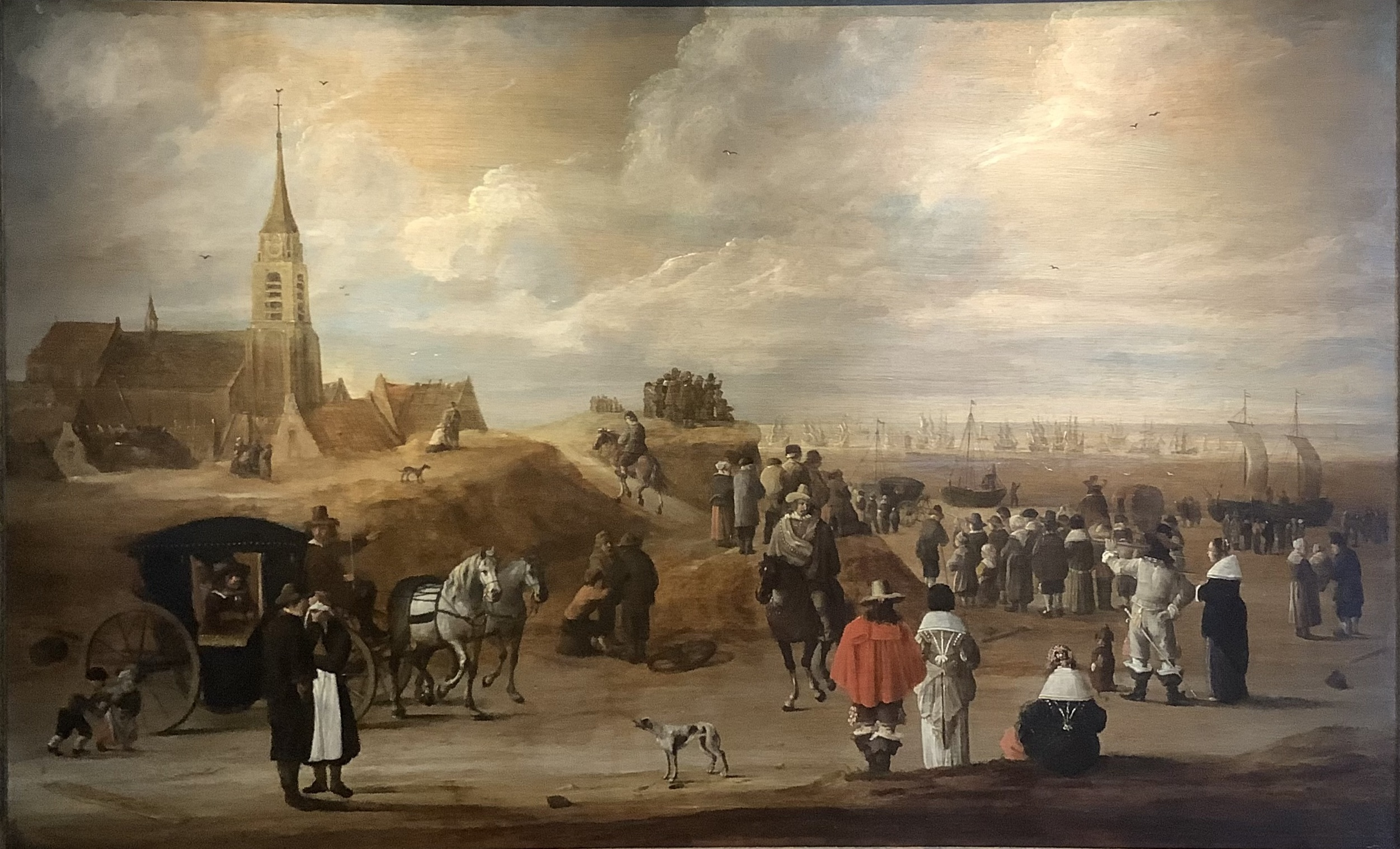
A crowd of people on the beach watches the naval battle of Scheveningen in 1653.

Cornelis Beelt (born 1602/1612 – died 1664/1702), was a Dutch Golden Age landscape painter.

== Biography ==
According to the RKD though older sources claim he was born in Rotterdam in 1640, this is impossible because he was engaged to be married in Haarlem 30 March 1630. This places the year of his birth between 1602 and 1612. It is unknown in what year he became a member of the Haarlem Guild of St. Luke, but he is listed in 1661 as one of the 51 better-known painters of the total of 72 painters who paid their 7 stuivers that year. He is known for signed landscapes between 1651 and 1664. He is listed in Vincent van der Vinne's list of guild members that he knew and his name was marked with a "d" for dead before 1702 as "cor: beelt". He was a follower of Willem Gillisz Kool. His last dated work was from 1664, so he died sometime between 1664 and 1702.
