= Supaplex =

1991 video game

- Developer: Think!Ware Development
- Publisher: Dream Factory (Digital Integration)
- Designers: Philip Jespersen; Michael Stopp
- Platforms: Amiga, MS-DOS
- Release: 1991
- Genre: Puzzle
- Mode: Single-player

Supaplex is a video game created by Philip Jespersen and Michael Stopp, two Swiss students, and published by Digital Integration in 1991. It is an extended clone of Boulder Dash.

== History ==
Aiming to develop a version of Boulder Dash that could fit onto a floppy disk, the designers had a hard time developing better graphics under said constraint. The original Amiga Supaplex version had to fit on a standard 880 kB floppy disk and needed to run on a standard 512 kB Amiga like the original A500 or A2000. In fact, the Amiga version could not be copied onto the hard drive due to copy protection and its custom disk format.

The game was released for Amiga and MS-DOS. Two people from the London area started developing a full version for the Atari ST, but it was never released because of the limited graphical support. Unofficial ports have been made to other platforms, such as the ZX Spectrum.

Due to hardware-dependent programming, the PC version of Supaplex ran twice as fast as PCs became faster. Herman Perk disassembled the game, debugged it and re-assembled it again. The result became known as SpeedFix. Extra features have also been added without changing the game itself.

The developers of the game have declared the software to be freeware. Level editors and a Win32 clone called "Megaplex" were created.

== Gameplay ==
A partial screenshot showing a few elements of the game

The game comes with 111 levels. Although the levels must be played in order, the game allows up to three levels to be skipped at any given time. Supaplex does not use time limits for solving the puzzles, unlike Boulder Dash. The game panel displays the current level number and all numbers of Infotrons that are required to finish the levels.

Most objects are identical in behaviour to those in the original Boulder Dash, simply redrawn with a computer hardware theme. Murphy replaces Rockford, who collects objects called Infotrons, which are reminiscent of schematic representations of atoms, instead of diamonds. Instead of dirt, the levels are filled with printed circuit board simply called base in the game's manual, and not lined with brick walls, but with computer chips and other hardware, and filled with Zonks instead of rocks. The enemies are moving scissors, called Snik Snaks, and electrons, which resemble sparkling stars.

Supaplex introduces a number of new elements that were not present in Boulder Dash, including bugs, pieces of base that randomly cause lethal electric arcs, Ports, which limit Murphy's movement to specific directions, and terminals, which set off yellow Utility Disks. Utility Disks are explosive floppy disks and come in three different colors: an Orange Disk may be pushed, falls down if a space under it is void, and explodes when hit by a Zonk, hits the bottom, or is detonated by a nearby explosion; Yellow Disks do not fall, yet may be pushed in any direction, but not pulled (which allows creating Sokoban-like puzzles), and explode when a Terminal is used or a close explosion occurs. Red Disks can be carried and dropped (by pressing Space) when convenient, exploding seconds after.

Supaplex is the first Boulder Dash-like game that is not fully grid-based: while the playing field is an obvious grid, the objects do not "snap" from one grid position to another, but can be halfway or "in between" grid positions while moving or falling. This behavior has led to a number of well-known bugs that can be turned to the player's advantage, many of which need to be exploited to complete fan-made levels. For instance, by turning around quickly, the player can cause an enemy or rock to "bounce" off Murphy.

The game also applies "gravity" on some levels, which means that Murphy will fall down empty spaces and will be unable to go back up, unless he climbs up by using bases. Gravity is not indicated visually – the player can only notice by trial and error.

== Reception ==
Reception

Review scores
Publication	Score
Amiga Action	84%
Amiga Computing	67%
Amiga Format	73%
Amiga Power	29%
Zero	84%
CU Amiga	85%

Supaplex received mostly favorable reviews. Comparing it to Boulder Dash and Emerald Mine, CU Amiga lauded the variety of the puzzles and the longevity of the gameplay, only lamenting the lack of a multiplayer mode and the need to restart difficult levels if the player makes a mistake. Amiga Action thought that it improved considerably on the game inspiring it, but expressed dissatisfaction with its graphics, and also felt that it was priced high since several public-domain Boulder Dash clones already existed. Zero praised the puzzle-oriented gameplay as addictive, with minor criticism directed at its stagnant graphics.

Amiga Format also found the game to be addictive, but was more forgiving of the graphics, calling them "simplistic but effective". Amiga Computing considered Supaplex to be an average game. It described its gameplay as dated with new features "to give it some welly", criticised its presentation for not providing context as to what the game is about, and felt that it should have been released as a budget title. In its negative review, Amiga Power criticised the length and difficulty of the levels and the game's overall presentation, writing that there are superior Boulder Dash clones released to the public domain.

== See also ==
- Repton (video game)
- Rocks'n'Diamonds
