= Q*bert =

1982 video game

- Arcade flyer
- Developer: Gottlieb
- Publishers: Gottlieb: Arcade; NA: Gottlieb; JP: Konami/Sega Ports Parker Brothers NES Ultra Games
- Designers: Warren Davis; Jeff Lee
- Programmer: Warren Davis
- Artist: Jeff Lee
- Composer: David Thiel
- Platform: Arcade: Atari 2600, ColecoVision, Intellivision, Atari 5200, Atari 8-bit, Commodore 64, Odyssey 2, SG-1000, TI-99/4A, VIC-20, ZX Spectrum, MSX, NES, Vidéoway, Game Boy, Game Boy Color, mobile phone, PlayStation 3
- Release: October 18, 1982: Arcade; NA: October 18, 1982; JP/EU: March 1983 2600; July 1983 ColecoVision, Intellivision; September 1983 5200; October 1983 C64; November 1983 ZX Spectrum; UK: 1984 NES; NA: February 1989 Game Boy; JP: January 14, 1992; NA: February 1992; EU: 1992 Game Boy Color; NA: September 2000 Mobile; NA: 2003 PlayStation 3; NA: February 22, 2007; EU: April 17, 2007
- Genres: Action, puzzle
- Modes: Single-player, multiplayer

Q*bert (/ˈkjuːbərt/) is a 1982 action video game developed and published by Gottlieb for arcades. It is a 2D action game with puzzle elements that uses isometric graphics to create a pseudo-3D effect. The objective of each level in the game is to change every cube in a pyramid to a target color by letting Q*bert, the on-screen character, hop on top of the cube while avoiding obstacles and enemies. Players use a joystick to control the character.

The game was conceived by Warren Davis and Jeff Lee, the latter of whom designed the titular protagonist and original concept, which was further developed and implemented by Davis. Q*bert was developed under the project name Cubes.

Q*bert was well-received in arcades and among critics. The game was Gottlieb's most successful video game and is among the most recognized brands from the golden age of arcade games. It has been ported to numerous platforms. The game's success resulted in sequels and the use of the character's likeness in merchandising, such as appearances on lunch boxes, toys, and an animated television show. The Q*bert character became known for his "swearing" and "Q*bertese sound" – an incoherent phrase made of synthesized speech generated by the sound chip and a speech balloon containing a grawlix that appears when he collides with an enemy.

Because the game was developed during the period when Columbia Pictures owned Gottlieb, the intellectual rights to Q*bert remained with Columbia, even after they divested themselves of Gottlieb's assets in 1984. Therefore, the rights have been owned by Sony Pictures Entertainment since its parent, Sony, acquired Columbia in 1989. Q*bert appeared in Disney's Wreck-It Ralph franchise, under license from Sony, and later appeared in 2015's Pixels.

== Gameplay ==
Q*bert is an action game with puzzle elements played from an axonometric third-person perspective to convey a three-dimensional look. The game is played using a single, diagonally mounted four-way joystick. The player controls Q*bert, who starts each game at the top of a pyramid made of 28 cubes, and moves by hopping diagonally from cube to cube. Landing on a cube causes it to change color, and changing every cube to the target color allows the player to progress to the next stage.

At the beginning, jumping on every cube once is enough to advance. In later stages, each cube must be hit twice to reach the target color. Other times, cubes change color every time Q*bert lands on them, instead of remaining on the target color once they reach it. Both elements are then combined in subsequent stages. Jumping off the pyramid results in the character's death.

Q*bert hops diagonally down the pyramid to avoid the purple snake, Coily.

The player is impeded by several enemies, introduced gradually to the game:

- Coily – Coily first appears as a purple egg that bounces to the bottom of the pyramid and then transforms into a snake that chases Q*bert. He is often considered the main antagonist and Q*bert's arch-nemesis. Q*bert will die if he collides with Coily.
- Ugg and Wrongway – Two purple creatures that fly or hop along the sides of the cubes in an Escheresque manner. Starting at either the bottom left or bottom right corner, they keep flying toward the top right or top left side of the pyramid respectively before leaving the pyramid by reaching the end. Both are dangerous. Q*bert will also die if he collides with them.
- Slick and Sam – Two green creatures that descend the pyramid and revert changed cubes to their original color, but do not harm Q*bert.

Contact with purple enemies results in a life lost, whereas the green ones are removed from the board upon contact. Colored balls occasionally appear at the second row of cubes and bounce downward; contact with a red ball also results in a life lost, while contact with a green one immobilizes the on-screen enemies for a limited time. Multicolored floating discs on either side of the pyramid serve as an escape from danger, particularly Coily. When Q*bert jumps on a disc, it transports him to the top of the pyramid. If Coily is in close pursuit of the character, he will jump after Q*bert and fall to his death, awarding bonus points and removing all enemies and balls (though they reappear after a few seconds).

Points are awarded for each color change (15 or 25), defeating Coily with a flying disc (500), remaining or unused discs at the end of a stage (at higher stages, 50 or 100) and catching either green balls (100) or Slick and Sam (300 each). Bonus points are also awarded for completing a screen, starting at 1,000 points on the first screen of Level 1 and increasing by 250 on each subsequent completion, up to 5,000 starting in Level 4. Extra lives are granted for reaching certain scores, which are set by the machine operator.

== Development ==
In this concept sketch, Q*bert is still depicted shooting his foes. The sole enemy type depicted appears to be Ugg or WrongWay, although some are positioned on top of the blocks instead of just the sides as they would appear in the final version.

=== Concept ===
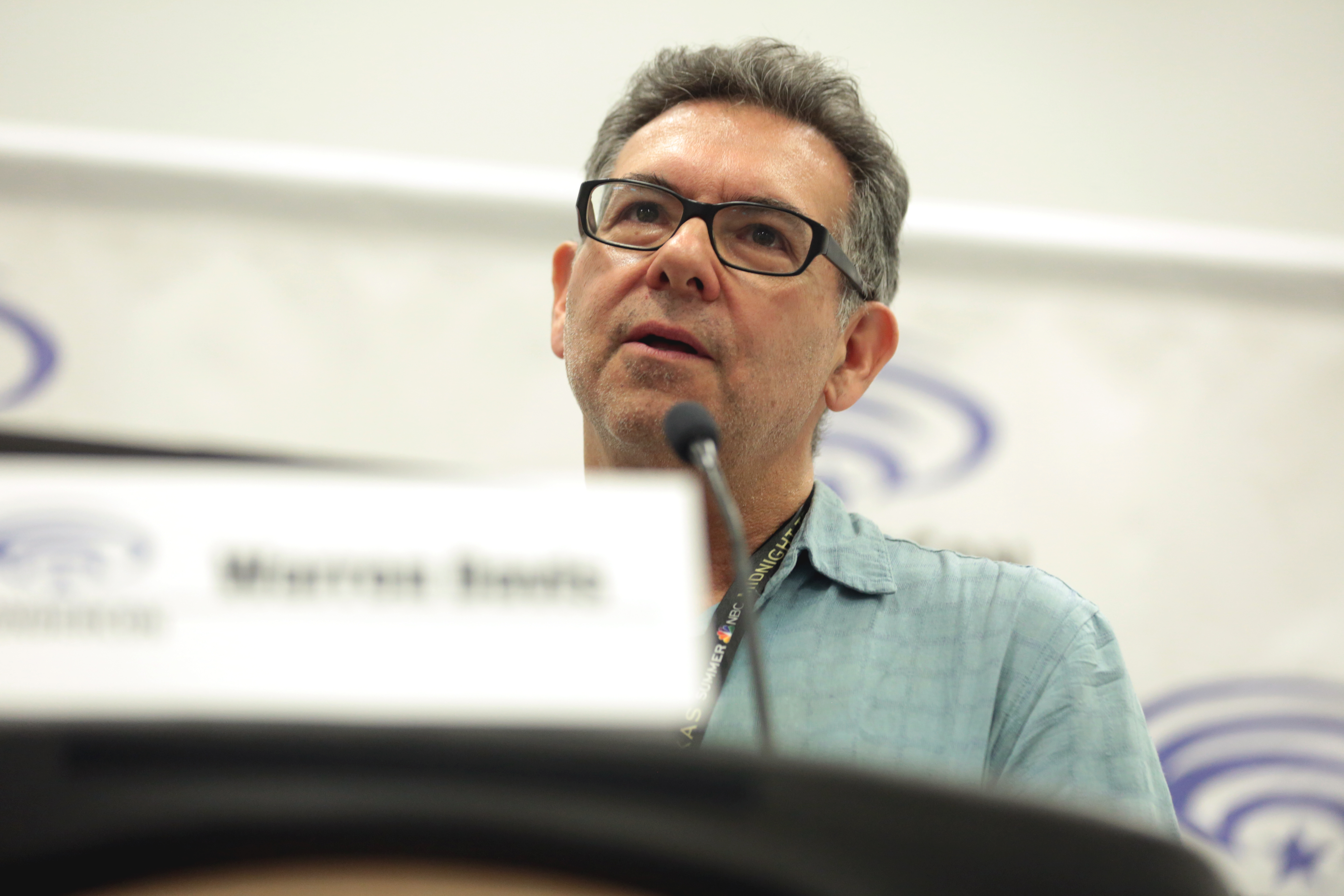
Q*bert developer Warren Davis

Programmer Warren Davis wrote that he was inspired by a pattern of hexagons implemented by fellow Gottlieb developer and Mad Planets designer Kan Yabumoto.

In a different telling, the initial concept began when artist Jeff Lee drew a pyramid of cubes inspired by M. C. Escher. Lee believed a game could be derived from the artwork, and created an orange, armless main character. The character jumped along the cubes and shot projectiles, called "mucus bombs", from a tubular nose at enemies. Enemies included a blue creature, later changed purple and named Wrong Way, and an orange creature, later changed green and named Sam. Lee had drawn similar characters since childhood, inspired by characters from comics, cartoons, Mad magazine and by artist Ed "Big Daddy" Roth. Q*bert's design later included a speech balloon with a string of nonsensical characters, "@!#?@!", (Note: The original artwork displays the first and fifth character as spirals. The at sign ("@") is used in its place in the text of the references.) which Lee originally presented as a joke.

=== Implementation ===
Warren Davis, who was hired to work on the game Protector, noticed Lee's ideas and asked if he could use them to practice programming randomness and gravity as game mechanics. Thus, he added balls that bounce from the pyramid's top to bottom. Because Davis was still learning how to program game mechanics, he wanted to keep the design simple. He also believed games with complex control schemes were frustrating and wanted something that could be played with one hand. To accomplish this, Davis removed the shooting and changed the objective of saving the protagonist from danger. As Davis worked on the game one night, Gottlieb's vice president of engineering, Ron Waxman, noticed him and suggested to change the color of the cubes after the game's character has landed on them. Davis implemented a unique control scheme; a four-way joystick was rotated 45° to match the directions of Q*bert's jumping. Staff members at Gottlieb urged for a more conventional orientation, but Davis stuck to his decision. Davis remembered to have started programming in April 1982, but the project was only put on the schedule as an actual product several months later. (Note: Davis stated that this happened "by June or July", whereas Howie Rubin, vice president of Gottlieb, claimed in an early 1983 interview with Video Games that the game was not yet on a list of games voted for in a brainstorming session in August. Tesser, Neil (April 1983). "The Life and Times of Q*bert & Joust" (PDF). Video Games. Vol. 1, no. 7. Pumpkin Press. pp. 26–30.)

=== Audio ===
We wanted the game to say, "You have gotten 10,000 bonus points", and the closest I came to it after an entire day would be "bogus points". Being very frustrated with this, I said, "Well, screw it. What if I just stick random numbers in the chip instead of all this highly authored stuff, what happens?"

— David Thiel on the creation of Q*bert's incoherent swearing.

A MOS Technology 6502 chip that operates at 894 kHz generates the sound effects, and a speech synthesizer by Votrax generates Q*bert's incoherent expressions. The audio system uses 128 B of RAM and 4 KB of EPROM to store the sound data and code to implement it. Like other Gottlieb games, the sound system was thoroughly tested to ensure it would handle daily usage. In retrospect, audio engineer David Thiel commented that such testing minimized time available for creative designing.

Thiel was tasked with using the synthesizer to produce English phrases for the game. However, he was unable to create coherent phrases and eventually chose to string together random phonemes instead. Thiel also believed the incoherent speech was a good fit for the "@!#?@!" in Q*bert's speech balloon. Following a suggestion from technician Rick Tighe, a pinball machine component known as a "knocker" was included to make a loud sound when a character falls off the pyramid. This knocker consists of a solenoid with a plunger that strikes the mounting bracket (which in turn is firmly fastened to the cabinet). Foam padding was added to the area of contact on the bracket; the developers decided the softer sound better matched a fall rather than a loud knocking sound. The cost of installing foam, however, was too expensive and the padding was omitted.

=== Title ===
The Gottlieb staff had difficulty naming the game. Aside from the project name "Cubes", it was untitled for most of the development process. The staff agreed the game should be named after the main character, but disagreed on the name. Lee's title for the initial concept—Snots And Boogers—was rejected, as was a list of suggestions compiled from company employees. According to Davis, vice president of marketing Howie Rubin championed @!#?@! as the title. Although staff members argued it was silly and would be impossible to pronounce, a few early test models were produced with @!#?@! as the title on the units' artwork. During a meeting, "Hubert" was suggested, and a staff member thought of combining "Cubes" and "Hubert" into "Cubert". Art director Richard Tracy changed the name to "Q-bert", and the hyphen was later changed to an asterisk. In retrospect, Davis expressed regret for the asterisk, because it prevented the name from becoming a common crossword term and it is a wildcard character for search engines.

=== Testing ===
As development neared the production stage, Q*bert underwent location tests in local arcades under its preliminary title @!#?@!, before being widely distributed. According to Jeff Lee, his oldest written record attesting to the game being playable as @!#?@! in a public location, a Brunswick bowling alley, dates back to September 11, 1982. Gottlieb also conducted focus groups, in which the designers observed players through a one-way mirror. The control scheme received a mixed reaction during playtesting; some players adapted quickly while others found it frustrating. Initially, Davis was worried players would not adjust to the different controls; some players would unintentionally jump off the pyramid several times, reaching a game over in about ten seconds. Players, however, became accustomed to the controls after playing several rounds of the game. The different responses to the controls prompted Davis to reduce the game's level of difficulty, a decision that he would later regret.

=== Release ===
Q*bert is Gottlieb's fourth video game. A copyright claim registered with the United States Copyright Office by Gottlieb on February 10, 1983 cites the date of publication of Q*bert as October 18, 1982. Video Games reported that the game was sold directly to arcade operators at its public showing at the AMOA show held November 18–20, 1982. Gottlieb offered the machines for $2600 per unit.

Cash Box magazine listed the mass-market US release date as December 1982. The game was distributed in Japan by Konami and Sega in March 1983. It was also released in Europe in March 1983.

== Reception ==
Q*bert is Gottlieb's only video game that earned considerable critical and commercial success, selling around 25,000 arcade cabinets. In the United States, it was among the thirteen highest-grossing arcade games of 1983. A cocktail version of the game was later produced. These machines have since become collector's items.

When the game was first introduced to a wider industry audience at the November 1982 AMOA show, it was immediately received favorably by the press. Video Games magazine placed Q*bert first in its list of Top Ten Hits, describing it as "the most unusual and exciting game of the show" and stating that "no operator dared to walk away without buying at least one". The Coin Slot reported "Gottlieb's game, Q*BERT, was one of the stars of the show", and predicted that "The game should do very well".

Contemporaneous reviews were equally enthusiastic, and focused on the uniqueness of the gameplay and audiovisual presentation. Roger C. Sharpe of Electronic Games considered it "a potential Arcade Award winner for coin-op game of the year", praising innovative gameplay and outstanding graphics. William Brohaugh of Creative Computing Video & Arcade Games described the game as an "all-round winner" that had many strong points. He praised the variety of sound effects and the graphics, calling the colors vibrant. Brohaugh lauded Q*bert's inventiveness and appeal, stating that the objective was interesting and unique. Michael Blanchet of Electronic Fun suggested the game might push Pac-Man out of the spotlight in 1983. Neil Tesser of Video Games also likened Q*bert to games released in the early 1980s in Japan, like Pac-Man and Donkey Kong, due to the focus on characters, animation and story lines, as well as the "absence of violence". Computer and Video Games magazine praised the game's graphics and colors.

Electronic Games awarded Q*bert "Most Innovative Coin-op Game" of the year. Video Games Player called it the "Funniest Game of the Year" among arcade games in 1983.

Q*bert continues to be recognized as a significant part of video game history. Author Steven Kent and GameSpy's William Cassidy considered Q*bert one of the more memorable games of its time. Author David Ellis echoed similar statements, calling it a "classic favorite". 1UP.com's Jeremy Parish and Kim Wild of Retro Gamer magazine described the game as difficult yet addictive. Author John Sellers also called Q*bert addictive, and praised the sound effects and three-dimensional appearance of the graphics. Cassidy called the game unique and challenging; he attributed the challenge in part to the control scheme. IGN's Jeremy Dunham believed the controls were poorly designed, describing them as "unresponsive" and "a struggle". He nonetheless considered the game addictive.

Edge magazine attributed the success of the game to the title character. They stated that players could easily relate to Q*bert, particularly because he swore. Computer and Video Games, however, considered the swearing a negative but the character appealing. Cassidy believed the game's appeal lay in the main character. He described Q*bert as cute and having a personality that made him stand out in comparison to other popular video game characters. The authors of High Score! referred to Q*bert as "ultra-endearing alien hopmeister", and the cutest game character of 1982.

== Ports ==
In the Atari 2600 version, the Escher-inspired visual style is removed and the pyramid shortened by one row. The discs are horizontal lines.

At the 1982 AMOA Show, Parker Brothers secured the license to publish home conversions of the Q*bert arcade game. Parker Brothers first published a port to the Atari 2600, and by the end of 1983, the company also advertised versions for Atari 5200, Intellivision, ColecoVision, Atari 8-bit computers, VIC-20, TI-99/4A, and Commodore 64. The release of the Commodore 64 version was noted to lag behind the others but appeared in 1984. Parker Brothers also translated the game into a standalone tabletop electronic game. It uses a VFD screen and has since become a rare collector's item. Q*bert was also published by Parker Brothers for the Philips Videopac in Europe, by Tsukuda Original for the Othello Multivision in Japan, and by Ultra Games for the NES in North America.

The initial home port for the Atari 2600, the most widespread system at the time, was met with mixed reactions. Video Games warned that buyers of the Atari 2600 version "may find themselves just a little disappointed." They criticized the lack of music, the removal of the characters Ugg and Wrongway, and the system's troubles handling the character sprites at a steady performance. Later, Mark Brownstein of the same magazine was more in favor of the game, but still cited the presence of fewer cubes in the game's pyramidal layout and "pretty poor control" as negatives. Will Richardson of Electronic Games noted a lack in audiovisual qualities and counter-intuitive controls, but commended the gameplay, stating that the game "comes much closer to its source of inspiration than a surface evaluation indicates." Randi Hacker of Electronic Fun with Computers & Games called it a "sterling adaption [sic]" Computer and Video Games scored the Atari VCS version 70% in 1989. In 2008, IGN's Levi Buchanan rated it the fourth-worst arcade port for the Atari 2600, mostly because of a lack of jumping animations for enemies, which instead appear instantly on the adjacent cube, making it impossible to know in which direction they are traveling before they land. Entertainment Weekly called Q*Bert one of the top ten games for the Atari 2600 in 2013, saying the port "lost the cool isometric perspective but none of the addictive gameplay."

Other home versions were well-received, with some exceptions. Of the ColecoVision version, Electronic Fun with Computers & Games noted that "Q*bert aficionados will not be disappointed." Brownstein called it one of the best of the authorized versions. Warren Davis also considered the ColecoVision version the most accurate port of the arcade. Computer and Video Games gave the ColecoVision version a 72% score. Brownstein judged the Atari 5200 version inferior to that for the ColecoVision because of the imprecision of the Atari 5200 controller, but noted that "it does tend to grow on you." Video Games identified the Intellivision version as the worst of the available ports, criticizing the system's controller as inadequate for the game. Antic magazine's David Duberman called the Atari 8-bit version "one of the finest translations of an arcade game for the home computer format", and Arthur Leyenberger of Creative Computing listed it as a runner-up for Best Arcade Adaptation to the system, praising its faithful graphics, sound, movement and playability. Softline was more critical, criticizing the Atari version's controls and lack of swearing. The magazine concluded that "the home computer game doesn't have the sense of style of the one in the arcades ... the execution just isn't there." In 1984, the magazine's readers named the game the fifth-worst Atari program of 1983. Computer Games called the C64 version an "absolutely terrific translation" that "almost totally duplicates the arcade game," aside from its lack of synthesized speech. The standalone tabletop was awarded Stand-Alone Game of the Year in Electronic Games. Electronic Gaming Monthly reviewed the NES version in 1989, with four critics scoring it 7, 3, 4 and 4 out of 10.

In 2003, a version for Java-based mobile phones was announced by Sony Pictures Mobile. Reviewers generally acknowledged it as a faithful port of the arcade original, but criticized the controls. Modojo's Robert Falcon stated that the diagonal controls take time to adapt to on a cell phone with traditional directions. Michael French of Pocket Gamer concluded: "You can't escape the fact it doesn't exactly fit on mobile. The graphics certainly do, and the spruced-up sound effects are timeless ... but really, it's a little too perfect a conversion." Airgamer criticized the gameplay as monotonous and the difficulty as frustrating. By contrast, Wireless Gaming Review called it "one of the best of mobile's retro roundup."

On February 22, 2007, Q*bert was released on the PlayStation 3's PlayStation Network by fellow Sony subsidiary Sony Online Entertainment. It features upscaled and filtered graphics, an online leaderboard for players to post high scores, and Sixaxis motion controls. The game received a mixed reception. IGN's Jeremy Dunham and GameSpot's Jeff Gerstmann did not enjoy the motion controls and said that the game was a title only for nostalgic players. Eurogamer.net's Richard Leadbetter judged the game's elements "too simplistic and repetitive to make them worthwhile in 2007." In contrast, 1UP.com's Jeremy Parish considered the title worth purchasing, citing its addictive gameplay.

== Legacy ==
According to Jeremy Parish, Q*bert is "one of the higher-profile titles of the classic era". In describing Q*bert's legacy, Jeff Gerstmann of GameSpot referred to the game as a "rare arcade success". In 2008, Guinness World Records ranked it behind 16 other arcade games in terms of their technical, creative and cultural impact. Though successful, the creators of the game did not receive royalties, as Gottlieb had no such program in place at the time. Davis and Lee nonetheless expressed pride about the game continuing to be remembered fondly.

=== Market impact ===
An advertisement flyer by Gottlieb showcasing several of the licensed tie-in products by Parker Brothers, Kenner, and others. The character's likeness was often slightly adjusted to serve the specific application.

Q*bert became one of the most merchandised arcade games behind Pac-Man, although according to John Sellers it was not nearly as successful as that franchise or Donkey Kong. The character's likeness appears on various items including coloring books, sleeping bags, frisbees, board games, wind-up toys, and stuffed animals. In a flyer distributed in 1983, Gottlieb claimed over 125 licensed products. However, the video game crash of 1983 depressed the market, and the game's popularity began to decline by 1984.

In the years following its release, Q*bert inspired many other games with similar concepts. The magazines Video Games and Computer Games both commented on the trend with features about Q*bert-like games in 1984. They listed Mr. Cool by Sierra On-Line, Frostbite by Activision, Q-Bopper by Accelerated Software, Juice by Tronix, Quick Step by Imagic, Flip & Flop and Boing by First Star Software, Pharaoh's Pyramid by Master Control Software, Pogo Joe by Screenplay, Rabbit Transit by Starpath, as games which had been inspired by Q*bert. Further titles that have been identified as Q*bert-like games include Cubit by Micromax, J-bird by Orion Software, and in the UK Bouncer by Acornsoft, Hubert by Blaby Computer Games, Pogo by Ocean, Spellbound by Beyond, Vector Hopper by Kristof Tuts, and Hoppy Hop by Josyan.

=== In other media ===
In 1983, Q*bert was adapted into an animated cartoon as part of Saturday Supercade on CBS, which features segments based on video game characters from the golden age of video arcade games. Saturday Supercade was produced by Ruby-Spears Productions, the Q*bert segments between 1983 and 1984. The show is set in a United States, 1950s era town called "Q-Burg", and stars Q*bert (voiced by Billy Bowles) as a high school student, altered to include arms, hands, jacket, and sneakers. He shoots black projectiles from his nose, which he calls "Slippy Dew", to make his enemies slip. Characters frequently say puns that add the letter "Q" to words.

Unlike the other shows in the package, in November 2015, Sony Pictures Home Entertainment released this segment on DVD in Region 1; Sony Pictures owned the rights to Q*bert due to Columbia Pictures owning Gottlieb during its development. The two-disc collection features 17 of the 19 episodes of the series.

Gottlieb released the pinball game Q*bert's Quest in 1983. It has two pairs of flippers in an "X" formation and uses audio from the arcade game. Gottlieb produced fewer than 900 units, but in Japan Game Machine listed Q*bert's Quest in their June 1, 1983 issue as being the second most-successful flipper unit of the year.

Q*bert is seen being played in the 1984 film Moscow on the Hudson starring Robin Williams.

The 1993 IBM PC role-playing game Ultima Underworld II: Labyrinth of Worlds has a segment where the player has to solve a pyramid puzzle as a homage to Q*bert. In the 2009 action-adventure game Ghostbusters: The Video Game, a Q*bert arcade cabinet can be seen in the Ghostbusters headquarters.

Q*bert alongside his enemies Coily, Slick, Sam and Ugg (except Wrong-Way) appear as homeless characters in Game Central Station due to their game being unplugged from the arcade in Disney's Wreck-It Ralph franchise.

Q*bert appears in the 2015 film Pixels as a supporting character, the film having produced by copyright owner Sony.

In 2014, Q*bert makes a cameo appearance in the RadioShack Super Bowl XLVIII commercial "The '80s Called".

The game has been referenced in several animated television series – Family Guy, Futurama, The Simpsons, Robot Chicken, Mad and South Park.

=== High scores ===
On November 28, 1983, Rob Gerhardt reached a record score of about 33 million points in a Q*bert marathon. He held it for almost 30 years before George Leutz from Brooklyn, New York, played one game of Q*bert for eighty-four hours and forty-eight minutes on February 14–18, 2013, at Richie Knucklez' Arcade in Flemington, New Jersey. He scored about 37 million points.

Doris Self, credited by Guinness World Records as the "oldest competitive female gamer", set the tournament record score of about 1.1 million for Q*bert in 1984 at the age of 58. Her record was surpassed by Drew Goins on June 27, 1987, with a score of about 2.2 million. Self continually attempted to regain the record until her death in 2006.

On November 18, 2012, George Leutz broke the Q*Bert tournament world record live at the Kong Off 2 event at The 1up Arcade and Bar in Denver, Colorado. Leutz scored about 3.9 million points in just under eight hours, earning 1.5 million points on his first life, beating Self's score using a single life. Leutz's score was verified by Twin Galaxies. The video ends at a score of 3.7 million points, 1.5 million points over the previous record.

=== Updates, remakes, and sequels ===
Q*bert series
1982	Q*bert
1983	Q*bert's Qubes
1984
1985
1986
1987
1988
1989
1990
1991
1992	Q*bert 3
1993
1994
1995
1996	Faster Harder More Challenging Q*bert
1997
1998
1999	Q*bert
2000
2001
2002
2003
2004	Q*bert 2004
2005	Q*bert 2005
2006
2007
2008
2009	Q*Bert Deluxe
2010
2011
2012
2013
2014	Q*bert: Rebooted
2015
2016
2017
2018
2019	Q*bert (iOS)

==== Faster Harder More Challenging Q*bert ====
Believing that the original game was too easy, Davis initiated development of Faster Harder More Challenging Q*bert in 1983, which increases the difficulty, introduces Q*bertha, and adds a bonus round. The project was canceled. Davis released the ROM image onto the web in December 1996.

==== Q*bert's Qubes ====
Several video game sequels were released over the years, but did not reach the same level of success as the original. The first, titled Q*bert's Qubes, shows a copyright for 1983 on its title screen, whereas the instruction manual cites a 1984 copyright. It uses the same hardware as the original. The game features Q*bert, but introduces new enemies: Meltniks, Shoobops, and Rat-A-Tat-Tat. The player navigates the protagonist around a plane of cubes while avoiding enemies. Jumping on a cube causes it to rotate, changing the color of the visible sides of the cube. The goal is to match a line of cubes to a target sample; later levels require multiple rows to match. Though part of a popular franchise, the game's release was hardly noticed. Parker Brothers showcased home versions of Q*bert's Qubes at the Winter Consumer Electronics Show in January 1985. Q*bert's Qubes was ported to the ColecoVision and Atari 2600. Versions for Atari 8-bit computers and the Commodore 64 were referred to in the instructions of the released conversions. The Atari 8-bit version has not yet been found, but Games That Weren't tracked down a preview of the C64 version in 2017.

In Q*bert's Qubes, the player rotates cubes in a line to match the target sample in the top left corner.

==== MSX Q*bert (1986) ====
Konami, who had distributed the original Q*bert to Japanese arcades in 1983, produced a different game, that kept the title Q*bert, released in Japan and Europe for MSX computers in 1986. The main character is a little dragon, and the mechanics are based on Q*bert's Qubes. Each of the 50 stages has a different pattern of cubes. The competitive 2-player mode assigns each side a different pattern, and the players score points either by completing their pattern first or by pushing the other off the board.

==== Q*bert for Game Boy ====
Developed by Realtime Associates and published by Jaleco in 1992, this version has 64 boards in different shapes and a scene from a short animation every four boards. The animation can be watched via pressing the buttons Right, Up, B, A, Down, Up, B, Down, Up, and B on the title screen.

==== Q*bert 3 ====
Q*bert 3 for the Super NES was developed by Realtime Associates and published by NTVIC in 1992. Jeff Lee worked on the graphics. It has gameplay similar to the original, but like the Game Boy game, has larger levels of varying shapes. In addition to enemies from the first game, it introduces Frogg, Top Hat, and Derby.

==== Q*bert (1999) ====
Q*bert is a remake of the 1982 arcade game of the same name with 3D graphics. It was developed by Artech Studios and released by Hasbro Interactive on the PlayStation and Microsoft Windows in 1999 and on the Game Boy Color and Dreamcast in 2000.

==== Q*bert 2004 ====
In 2004, Sony Pictures released a sequel for Adobe Flash titled Q*bert 2004, containing a faithful rendition of the original arcade game, along with 50 levels that use new board layouts and six new visual themes. Q*Bert Deluxe for iOS devices was initially released as a rendition of the arcade game, but later received updates with the themes and stages from Q*Bert 2004.

==== Q*bert 2005 ====
In 2005, Sony Pictures released Q*bert 2005 as a download for Windows and as a Flash browser applet, featuring 50 different levels.

==== Q*bert Rebooted ====
On July 2, 2014, Gonzo Games and Sideline amusement announced Q*bert Rebooted to be released on Steam, iOS and Android. Versions for PlayStation 3, PlayStation 4 and PlayStation Vita were released on February 17, 2015, in North America and February 18, 2015, in Europe. It was released on February 12, 2016, for the Xbox One. According to Mark Caplan, Vice President, Consumer Products, Worldwide Marketing & Distribution at Sony Pictures Entertainment, the release was motivated by "renewed interest in Q*bert, in part due to the cameo in the recent Wreck-It Ralph animated feature film".

Q*bert Rebooted contains a port of the classic arcade game alongside a new playing mode that uses hexagonal shapes, increasing the number of possible movement directions to six. Additionally, the 'Rebooted' mode features new enemy types, including a boxing glove that punches Q*bert off the levels and a treasure chest that tries to avoid him. The game has 5 different stage designs spread across 40 levels, which contain three rounds and a bonus round and have to be completed with 5 lives. Gems are collected to unlock different skins for the Q*bert character, and completing levels multiple times while reaching specific time and score goals is awarded with stars that enable access to more levels.

==== Q*bert (2019) ====
On October 11, 2019, an updated version of Q*bert developed by Lucky-Kat games in association with Sony Pictures was published via the iOS and Android.
