= McCoo =

McCoo is a surname. Notable people with the surname include:

- Eric McCoo (born 1980), American football player
- Marilyn McCoo (born 1943), American singer

== See also ==
- McCool
