= Rocks'n'Diamonds =

1995 video game

- Developer: Holger Schemel
- Publisher: Artsoft Entertainment
- Platforms: Linux; Windows; OS X; MS-DOS; Android
- Release: 23 October 1995: Linux; 23 October 1995; MS-DOS; 5 December 1998; Windows; 1 January 2001; Mac OS X; 5 August 2002
- Genre: Puzzle
- Modes: Single-player, multiplayer

Rocks'n'Diamonds is an open source (Note: Although the game is licensed under the free GNU General Public License, it is unclear whether that license extends to its assets. See § Development.) puzzle video game created by Holger Schemel and published in 1995 by Artsoft Entertainment. It is a clone of Boulder Dash, Supaplex, Emerald Mine, and Sokoban.

== Gameplay ==
A clone of several puzzle games, Rocks'n'Diamonds features gameplay elements from Boulder Dashand several of its variants like Emerald Mine, Diamond Caves and Supaplex —as well as Sokoban, and comes with complete levels sets from all of them, although levels can contain combinations of elements from any of the aforementioned games, as well as new ones.

A common element of Rocks'n'Diamonds involves collecting a set number of diamonds, opening an exit door through which the player can enter the next level. The levels are filled with dirt, which can be dug by simply moving through it, leaving behind empty space, as would "snapping" it without moving the player character. Diamonds are collected in a similar manner. Rocks and diamonds rest on dirt, walls, or other rocks and gems, but fall down once these are removed or a space next to them is vacated. This is sometimes useful, as the player can drop objects into "magic walls", which convert rocks passing through them into gems and gems into rocks, or on top of monsters roaming the levels, destroying most of anything surrounding them. Some destroyed monsters drop gems necessary to achieve the number needed to complete the level. Amoebae expand rapidly and, depending on the game style, will turn into either rocks after a certain amount of time or diamonds if suffocated with rocks prematurely.

The Emerald Mine and Supaplex level sets share the goal of collecting enough of an item before reaching the exit, but differ from the Boulder Dash set in having their own graphical styles, elements, and emulated engines and mechanics. For example, the Emerald Mine set includes dynamite that can be dropped to explode monsters and destructible objects and locked doors with matching keys, while the Supaplex set has no time limit and has levels where entryways restrict the player's movement and gravity affects their character. The Sokoban set differs from the others the most in that the goal is to push objects into the correct places in order to finish the level. As with Boulder Dash, the objects cannot be pulled, and the player must avoid situations where completing the objective becomes impossible. In this case, the objects are giant light bulbs that must be pushed into sockets.

During each session, the player's run is recorded and saved as a replay, as indicated in an interface styled after a tape recorder. Using the tape recorder's controls, the "tapes"—the term used by the game for replays—can then be played back for viewing, or they can be overwritten or ejected for recording on a new tape. With a tape, the player can rewind to any point and record from that position; this is useful in cases where the player wishes to retry a level without having to repeat an earlier part. The game includes a level editor that lets the player create custom levels. The game also supports custom graphics, as well as wholly new level elements that can be created without any prior programming knowledge. If the "Team Mode" option is selected, then up to four players can participate simultaneously in a multiplayer game, depending on session settings and a level's structure. This takes place either locally or over a local area network or the Internet under a client–server model.

== Development ==
Rocks'n'Diamonds's development was begun by Holger Schemel of Artsoft Entertainment, based in Germany. Schemel previously developed a port of Mindbender, a puzzle game based on Deflektor, for the Amiga in 1989 before releasing it on Linux as a free and open-source game called Mirror Magic II in May 1995. His new project would be graphically similar to and its engine based on that of Mirror Magic II.

The game is programmed in C. The first version of Rocks'n'Diamonds, version 0.9, was published for X11-supported Linux distributions on 23 October 1995. This was followed by several major updates. The MS-DOS port debuted with version 1.2.0 on 5 December 1998. Version 2.0.0 saw the game's code rewritten to be compilable with Simple DirectMedia Layer on 1 January 2001, and is thus marked as the release date for the Windows version. With version 2.1.0, Mac OS X was given a port on 5 August 2002. In addition to the game's own engine, three algorithms based on external sources were provided to emulate the mechanics of other games for increased level compatibility. One such method is derived from the engine of Megaplex, a clone of Supaplex, and was first used for Supaplex-styled levels in 2010. The second method was added in 2020 for Emerald Mine levels, based on the engine of an unofficial port of Emerald Mine for X11. The third algorithm, based on the engine of a Boulder Dash clone called GDash, is used for Boulder Dash levels and first appeared in 2024—twenty years after Schemel first conceived of an engine compatible with the original game.

On 17 September 2014, the source code was made available via a Git repository, where the game continues to receive changes as of 29 May 2025. Rocks'n'Diamonds is published under the GNU General Public License, version 2 and later. However, the Debian package's copyright file states that the status of the game data, which includes graphics resembling those of Emerald Mine and Supaplex and music originating in Amiga demos, is unclear. Therefore, the package is bundled with only the source code and hosted in the contrib area of the Debian repository; the installer then requests to retrieve the necessary files from Artsoft's website.

== Reviews ==
Reviewing Rocks'n'Diamonds in 1998, Amiga Dream praised its environment, including the graphics and sound effects, and the level editor. Recommending it especially to newcomers of Boulder Dash-style games, it concluded that, while not demanding on a graphics card such as a RIVA TNT, the game would get first-time players "quickly tak[ing] on the form of the arrow keys". The game garnered a generally favorable reception in the Czech Republic. Doupě.cz welcomed the tape recorder feature, but had a mixed reaction to the art style and criticized the difficulty curve and the choice of brief, low-quality samples for music (which Artsoft removed in 2010, citing the industry's awareness of sharing copyrighted files on the Internet). The same reviewer also lauded the game's ease of use and the editor's versatility. Root.cz was more dismissive of the graphics for its retro look, but praised the breadth of user-made levels sent to the game's author.

Martin Brinkmann of Ghacks recommended Rocks'n'Diamonds as a means of reliving a Commodore 64 classic, praising the execution and the music pulled from the Amiga demoscene. Other sources to recommend the game include Free Software Magazine and Linux Magazine. The Czech magazine Score regarded it as the best and most comprehensive Boulder Dash clone—a point that Edge magazine concurred with when considering it as a noncommercial title with an extensive player base and user-generated content; as of 2006, there were over 50,000 levels available online.

== See also ==
- List of open-source video games
