= Spy vs. Spy II: The Island Caper =

1985 video game

- Developer: First Star Software
- Designer: Michael Riedel
- Platforms: Amiga, Amstrad CPC, Apple II, Commodore 64, Atari 8-bit, Atari ST, Famicom, ZX Spectrum, MSX
- Release: NA: June 1, 1985
- Modes: Single-player, Multiplayer

Spy vs. Spy II: The Island Caper is a 1985 video game developed by First Star Software. It is the sequel to Spy vs. Spy. It can be played as both single-player and multiplayer

== Gameplay ==
When in the same room, both players use the same screen, leaving the other blank.

Spy vs. Spy II: The Island Caper adds a side-scrolling play area. Spies no longer start with a fixed number of traps but must collect the raw materials to build them

== Reception ==
Ahoy! stated that Spy vs. Spy II "expands and improves" on the first game, with all-new traps and improved graphics.

Steve Panak for ANALOG Computing wrote "you've got an action-packed game. Spy vs Spy II is a fantasy adventure recommended for all who enjoy a little harmless espionage."

Computer and Video Games stated "The cartoon graphics are every bit as good as on Spy vs Spy and, with seven levels of action, you'll find it a real challenge."

In a 92/100 review, Zzap! concluded "Fans of the original won't be disappointed."
