= Astro Chase =

1982 video game

- Atari 5200 box cover
- Developer: First Star Software
- Publishers: First Star Software; Parker Brothers; Exidy (arcade)
- Designer: Fernando Hererra
- Platforms: Atari 8-bit, Arcade, Atari 5200, Commodore 64
- Release: 1982: Atari 8-bit 1983: Atari 5200; 1984: C64, arcade
- Genre: Multidirectional shooter
- Mode: Single-player
- Arcade system: Max-A-Flex

Astro Chase is a multidirectional shooter written by Fernando Herrera for Atari 8-bit computers. It was published by First Star Software in 1982 as the company's first game. Parker Brothers licensed it, releasing cartridge versions for the Atari 8-bit computers and Atari 5200 console in 1983 and a Commodore 64 version in 1984. Exidy licensed it for arcade use with its Max-A-Flex cabinet.

Gameplay takes place on a 2D scrolling map of space around Earth, which the player has to defend from an alien force. The primary target is a number of Mega-Mines, which approach the Earth and must be destroyed. Contemporaneous reviewers were impressed by the graphics, but retrospective evaluations have called the game simplistic.

== Gameplay ==
The game opens with the player looking at a scene at a spaceport, in a simulated 3D view. A flying saucer is hovering just to the right of center, and the player's character is seen exiting a terminal building on the left, walking to the spaceship, waving goodbye, and then beaming aboard.

Atari 8-bit screenshot

The view then cuts to space, where the player uses the joystick to cause the screen to rapidly scroll in the selected direction, creating the illusion of flight. The screen is filled with planets and other objects. When the user presses the fire button on the joystick, the stick stops causing the ship to move, and instead fires its weapon in the chosen direction. The ship can simultaneously move and fire in different directions.

The enemy aliens attack the player with an endless supply of attack saucers; however, they are not the player's main opponent. The real threat is the 16 Megamines that start at the end of the universe and slowly make their way towards planet Earth, displayed in the center of the game map. If a single Megamine manages to reach Earth, the planet explodes.

The game's music is an endless loop of the 1812 Overture. After destroying all 16 Megamines in a given level, the player is able to move to the next of the 36 levels. Every four levels, the ship returns to Earth, where a cutscene animation is shown.

== Development ==
In 1981, Atari, Inc. introduced the Atari Star Award for the best new program distributed though their Atari Program Exchange. The winner of the first $25,000 grand prize was Fernando Herrera for My First Alphabet, a children's game.

Fernando was working at a computer retail store owned by Billy Blake. Blake was also a feature film producer, along with his business partner Richard Spitalny. They decided to start and fund an interactive software company to showcase Fernado's talents, naming it First Star Software. Astro Chase was the first title from the new company, released on 7 December 1982.

A version of Astro Chase for the Atari 2600 was completed in 1983, but not published.

== Reception ==
The Atari 8-bit computer version of Astro Chase was reviewed by Video magazine in its "Arcade Alley" column where it was described as "a state-of-the-art space shoot-out" and as "a revolutionary game with graphic achievements of stunning virtuosity". Reviewers specifically praised the game's innovative "single thrust propulsion" mechanic. The game was awarded "1984 Best Science Fiction/Fantasy Computer Game" at the 5th annual Arkie Awards, where judges described it as "slam-bang space battle" and praised its animated intermissions.

Allen Doum reviewed the game for Computer Gaming World, and stated that "What qualifies Astro Chase as "state of the art" is the graphics presentation. The full scrolling playfield is not only drawn beautifully, but changes with each chase." Softline stated that "Astro Chase is just about all you could ask for in an arcade game ... an exercise in class and style", citing its "Tremendous graphics".

Retrospective looks at the game are harsher. Keita Iida wrote, "the gorgeous 3-D starfield is just another 2-D maze—with round obstructions instead of walls." He concluded, "Astro Chase is one big letdown and serves as a reminder that graphics are only skin deep".

== Legacy ==
In 1994, MacPlay released a first-person reworking of the game for Classic Mac OS as Astro Chase 3D.
