= Emerald Mine =

1987 video game

- Developer: Kingsoft
- Publisher: Kingsoft
- Designers: Klaus Heinz; Volker Wertich
- Platforms: Amiga, Atari ST, Commodore 64, Commodore 16, Plus/4
- Release: 1987
- Genres: Puzzle, maze
- Modes: Single-player, multiplayer

Emerald Mine is a 1987 puzzle video game developed and published for Amiga and Atari ST by Kingsoft. The series follows mines filled with various gems, such as emeralds. It is a Boulder Dash clone in which the player completes levels by collecting sufficient gems before reaching the exit. Emerald Mine was Kingsoft's best-selling title with reviews generally favorable, and spawned several sequels. It was also Volker Wertich's, one of the game's designers, most successful game until The Settlers in 1993, of which he was also the creator.

== Gameplay ==
Emerald Mine is a top-down, tile-based puzzle game. Similar to Boulder Dash, it revolves around a character who attempts to collect enough emeralds and diamonds scattered across maze-like structures before reaching the exit, all within a time limit. The player character is immune to gravity, but objects such as stones and the aforementioned gems will fall to the ground, rolling to the side when the underground is loose and killing the character if one falls on him. Stones and other non-collectible objects can be pushed aside if the space next to them is empty. The player can move their character over squares of sand, digging away any in the way and creating an open space for the objects. Collectible objects and sand adjacent to the player's current position can also be removed without moving to those squares.

Some of these mazes contain enemies, including those that travel along a wall on a certain side and one kind that eats diamonds in its way. They can be killed by falling objects, one of which will explode into a diamond and up to eight emeralds. The difference between the two genstones is that a diamond is worth three emeralds and can be crushed by a falling stone, destroying it. Additionally, in some levels are amoebae given one or a combination of properties, depending on the level: they expand across adjacent tiles of space or sand, or deadly drops fall from them. Amoebae pose a unique threat in that they can enclose the player if not managed. Other elements include colored keys to unlock doors, explosive bombs and collectible dynamite that can be used to destroy enemies and weak walls, and blue walls through which falling stones are converted into emeralds, emeralds into diamonds, and diamonds back into stones. A player scores points by collecting gemstones, crushing enemies with a boulder, cracking a nut to release an emerald, and as a bonus by having leftover time at the end of the level. Emerald Mine allows for two players to cooperate and complete their objectives, with some levels designed exclusively for that mode.

== Development ==
Emerald Mine was developed by Kingsoft, based in Aachen. It was designed by Klaus Heinz and Volker Wertich. Wertich would later go on to become the creator of a more successful game, the debut installment of The Settlers, in 1993. This game was released for Amiga and Atari ST in 1987 and ported to the Commodore 64 and the Commodore 16 and Plus/4 computers the next year.

== Reception ==
Reception

Review scores
Publication	Score
Aktueller Software Markt	10/12 (AMI)
Tilt	17/20 (AMI)
Amiga Joker	Release year: 85% 1992: 72%
Happy Computer	77% (AMI)
.info	4/5 (AMI)

Emerald Mine received generally favorable reviews, was Kingsoft's best-selling title, and was also Wertich's most successful game until The Settlers. Aktueller Software Markt cited the game's high difficulty; saying "If you liked well-programmed, tricky games, then Emerald Mine would be exactly the right thing for you. Happy Computer praised the music and digitised sound effects and found the puzzles to be addictive and very satisfying to solve. Tilt magazine described the game's multidirectional scrolling as "fluid" and wrote that the game's longevity was guaranteed by its variety.

The game's multiplayer mode was well received. While directing minor criticism towards its graphics, Commodore Computing International considered Emerald Mine a good and inexpensive addition to the Amiga games library that had yet to expand to over a hundred full-price titles. Amiga World remarked on the game's addictive nature, comparing it to arcade classics, and noted its ability to save up to eight player names, their score totals, and how many levels they mastered—a feature unusual at the time. In its retrospective review, Amiga Joker commented on the game's appeal, saying "It's the playing fun that counts", and that the design was well received: "Nobody offers such a good control and inventively designed levels".

Happy Computer considered it to be the best budget game of the year, and Amiga World awarded the game the title of the Number One Amiga Game of All Time in 1988.

== Sequels and legacy ==
Kingsoft developed and published Emerald Mine 2, the game's sequel, in 1988 with 100 new levels. A level editor was included, which triggered the creation of thousands of levels by players.

In 1990, Kingsoft published a selection of levels created by players, called Emerald Mine 3: Professional. It was panned by critics, citing the game being lazy, with Power Play magazine saying "[The third part] has been cobbled too unlovingly. No question, the game mechanics and elements are still fine invented, but they should have removed the dust layer lying on it." Amiga Joker was also highly critical of the game's presentation commenting; "There's no change on graphics and sound […], all technical details like animation and scrolling appear substantially dated."

In 1994, Almathera published a collection of 14,160 levels on compact disk for the Amiga CD32, titled Emerald Mines. It received a better critical reception than that of EM3, with Amiga Games commenting that the gameplay was as good as ever, "This Boulder Dash clone doesn't come up with spectacular graphics, but the addicting game principle and over 10,000 levels should guarantee playing fun for months." Amiga Joker also commented on the gameplay; "The game elements are in such an abundance and variants that variety is presented truly in the whole lot. [... But since it is imbalanced] it is more a CD for fans [...]

Emerald Mine's levels and assets formed part of the basis for Rocks'n'Diamonds, another clone of Boulder Dash and a free and open-source game, along with Supaplex.
