= Spellbound (1984 video game) =

- Title screen
- Publisher(s): Beyond Software
- Designer(s): P.W. Norris
- Platform(s): ZX Spectrum
- Release: 1984
- Genre(s): Action
- Mode(s): Single-player

Spellbound is a Q*bert clone written by P.W. Norris for the ZX Spectrum and published by Beyond Software.
