= Kewl =

Kewl may refer to:

- Cool (disambiguation)
- KEWL
- Kewl Chix
- Kewl Magazine
