= Cool (surname) =

Cool is a surname. Notable people with the surname include:

- Fabien Cool (born 1972), French soccer player
- Kenton Cool (born 1973), British mountaineer

== See also ==
- Tré Cool (born 1972, as Frank Edwin Wright III), U.S. drummer from the band Green Day
- Kaul (Kashmiri: कौल (Devanagari), کول (Nastaleeq)), a surname also spelled as "Cool"
- Mister Cool (disambiguation)
- Cole (surname)
- Cooling (surname)
- Cools (surname)
- McCool (surname)
