= Rockford (video game) =

1988 video game

- Publisher: Mastertronic
- Platforms: Arcade, Amstrad CPC, Commodore 64, Amiga, Atari ST, Atari 8-bit, MS-DOS, ZX Spectrum
- Release: 1988

Rockford is a 1988 arcade video game developed by Mastertronic's Arcadia Systems as a spin-off of the home computer series Boulder Dash. The original arcade version of Rockford ran on the "Arcadia Multi Select system", an Amiga 500-based system that supported multiple games.

Mastertronic ported the game to home computers, with the 16-bit versions on their Melbourne House label and the 8-bit versions released on the Mad X budget label.

== Plot ==
Rockford is a game in which the player is on a treasure hunt involving five different worlds, and needs to collect treasures while avoiding getting crushed by giant rocks, boxing himself in, getting caught by enemies or running out of time. Once the required amount of treasure is collected, the player must locate the exit door to finish the level.

=== The Explorer ===
Gold coins must be collected. Enemies here are bats and evil monkeys. Killing a bat will give 9 coins. One level features a giant snake, which can turn evil monkeys to stones and stones to gold coins.

=== The Cook ===
This food-themed world consists oranges (or rolls) as stones, and apples as treasures. The enemies are sandwiches and fried eggs. Killing a sandwich gives 9 apples. This world features two types of sausages - a good sausage, which turns fried eggs into oranges and oranges into apples, and an evil rotten sausage which does the polar opposite. One level features a clock collectible, which gives additional time.

=== The Cowboy ===
Stones are cacti here, and red rubies are collectibles. Enemies include geologic hammers and Colt Woodsman revolvers. Hammers give 9 rubies when killed. The final level has a colonist wagon which turns cacti into rubies and cold woodsman revolvers into cacti. This worlds' clock powerups are bugged and will not increase overall time.

=== The Cosmonaut ===
Cosmonaut players must collect suns, and Earth globes function as stones. Enemies are mainly evil black holes, but at one level, strange dinosaur-like space-doves appear, which give out 9 suns when killed. This particular level is also notable for a boiling and expanding plasma-like substance which kills enemies when they are in its close proximity, while growing even bigger. At the end, the whole mass may eventually turn into suns or Earth globes.

=== The Doctor ===
Hearts must be collected here, eyeballs serve as stones. Enemies include skulls, and palette-swapped butterflies (these give out hearts when killed). Two worm-like characters will also appear here: a bony one, which turns hearts to eyeballs and eyeballs to skulls, and a healthy meaty one which turns skulls back to eyeballs and eyeballs to hearts.

== Gameplay ==
Rockford is an action arcade game counterpart to Boulder Dash. The game has four difficulty levels, 80 screens, and digitized sound effects.

The player must collect the designated amount of treasure items before he could leave the area and proceed to the next level. Every world features 4 levels, making it 20 levels altogether. The player dies if a stone or a treasure item falls onto him, collides or touches an enemy (even brushing against is enough for the kill), or runs out of time. The player must also watch out not to get himself or the exit locked. The player can kill enemies to break through walls and to obtain the desired amount of treasures.

There are several special characters and contraptions to assist the player, such as faucets, clocks, plasma walls and worm-like creatures.

This game has two distinct versions - one version offers unlimited lives, whereas the other gives 4 lives to the player upon starting a world, and an extra life is awarded after every 20000 points. Points are earned by collecting treasure items and racing the clock.

Rockford was originally planned to contain a bonus disk with five extra worlds with significantly more challenging levels. These worlds, the scuba diver, football player, music conductor, leprechaun and gem miner are partially included in the game files, but they are unplayable without modifying the game.

== Reception ==
The game was reviewed in 1989 in Dragon #141 by Hartley, Patricia, and Kirk Lesser in "The Role of Computers" column. The reviewers gave the game 4 1/2 out of 5 stars.
