= Kool =

Kool may refer to:

== People ==
- Kool (surname), surname of Dutch origin
- Robert "Kool" Bell (born 1950), American bassist and founder of Kool and the Gang
- Roger Kool (1954–2005), Singaporean DJ (Roger Kiew)
- Kool DJ Herc (born 1955), Jamaican–American DJ and hip hop pioneer (Clive Campbell)
- Kool DJ Red Alert (born 1956), American DJ and hip hop pioneer (Frederick Crute)
- DJ Kool (born 1958), American DJ and rapper (John W. Bowman)
- Kool Moe Dee (born 1962), American rapper (Mohandas Dewese)
- Kool Keith (born 1963), American rapper (Keith M. Thornton)
- Kool Bob Love (born 1967), American DJ, breakdancer and streetball player (Bobbito Garcia)
- Kool Shen (born 1966), French rapper, actor and producer (Bruno Lopes)
- Kool G. Rap (born 1968), American rapper (Nathaniel T. Wilson)
- Kool Kim (born 1971), American rapper (Kim Sharpton)
- Kool Savas (born 1975), German rapper (Savaş Yurderi)
- Kool Kojak (born 1970s), American musician (Allan P. Grigg)
- Kool A.D. (born 1983), American rapper (Victor Vazquez)

== Broadcasting ==
- KOOL 96.5, the branding for radio station CKUL-FM in Halifax, Nova Scotia, Canada
- KOOL 97.3, the branding for radio station KEAG in Anchorage, Alaska
- KOOL 99.1, the branding for radio station KODZ in Eugene, Oregon
- KOOL 101.5, the branding for radio station CKCE-FM in Calgary, Alberta, Canada
- KOOL 101.7, the branding for radio station KLDJ in Duluth, Minnesota
- KOOL 101.9, the branding for radio station KFMH in Belle Fourche, South Dakota
- KOOL 105.1, the branding for radio station KXKL-FM in Denver, Colorado
- KOOL 105.9, the former branding for radio station KFBW (then KQOL) in Vancouver, Washington
- KOOL 107.5, the branding for radio station CKMB-FM in Barrie, Ontario, Canada
- KOOL 107.9, the branding for radio station KBKL in Grand Junction, Colorado
- KOOL 108, the branding for radio station KQQL in Anoka, Minnesota
- Kool FM, a pirate radio station in the UK
- KOOL-FM, a radio station (94.5 FM) in Phoenix, Arizona
- KKNT, a radio station (960 AM) in Phoenix, Arizona, formerly known as KOOL
- KSAZ-TV, a television station (channel 10) in Phoenix, Arizona, formerly known as KOOL-TV

== Other uses ==
- Kool (cigarette), a brand of cigarettes
- Kool (film), a 2011 Indian Kannada-language film
- "Kool", a song by Benee from her 2020 album Hey U X
- "Kool", a song by 28 Days from their 1998 album 28 Days

== See also ==
- Cool (disambiguation)
