= Omnicron Conspiracy =

1989 video game

- Developer(s): First Star Software
- Publisher(s): Epyx (US); Image Works (EU)
- Platform(s): Amiga, Atari ST, MS-DOS
- Release: 1989: MS-DOS; 1990: Amiga, ST
- Genre(s): Adventure

Omnicron Conspiracy is an adventure video game developed by First Star Software for MS-DOS. It was published in 1989 by Epyx in the United States and Image Works in the UK and German markets. Versions were released for the Amiga and Atari ST in 1990.

== Gameplay ==
Omnicron Conspiracy a graphic adventure starring the intergalactic police officer Ace Powers.

== Reception ==
Reception

Award
Publication	Award
C+VG	Hit

Dennis Owens reviewed the game for Computer Gaming World, and stated that "Omnicron Conspiracy, because of its logical puzzles, ease of interaction, and humorous (sometimes, downright sweet, small touches), can certainly be recommended. It makes an interesting change of pace and offers an entertaining story for anyone who likes graphic adventures."
