= Mr. Cool (video game) =

1983 video game

- Publisher: Sierra On-Line
- Designer: Peter Oliphant
- Programmers: Atari 8-bit, C64; Peter Oliphant; Apple II, IBM PC; John Redekopp
- Platforms: Apple II, Atari 8-bit, Commodore 64, IBM PC
- Release: 1983
- Genre: Action

Mr. Cool is an action game designed by Peter Oliphant and published in 1983 by Sierra On-Line for the Atari 8-bit computers and Commodore 64 home computers. The ports for the IBM PC (as a self-booting disk) and Apple II were written by John Redekopp and released the same year. The game is heavily inspired by the 1982 arcade video game Q*bert.

== Gameplay ==
Gameplay screenshot (Atari 8-bit)

The player controls an ice cube (titular Mr. Cool) starting each game at the top of a seven-tiered pyramid of hot plates. He must jump diagonally from plate to plate and turn them all to the same color. At first only one touching of each plate is required, but on subsequent levels two or more landings on each plate are needed. The many obstacles the player must avoid include fireballs and hot springs dropping from the top and bouncing to the bottom of a pyramid. Once on any level the player can activate "Supercool Time" lasting for fifteen seconds. Then he can turn the fireballs into snowballs and cool down hot springs.

There are fifteen rounds in every level, and the levels become faster as the player progresses.

== Development ==
After finishing his first game for Sierra On-Line, Wall War, Peter Oliphant became interested in Q*bert. He identified some problems with that game—a certain repetitiveness. Mr. Cool was a response to that: "a game like Q*bert, but better". He had the Atari 8-bit version finished three weeks after he first started thinking about it.

== Reception ==
Softline wrote in a 1983 review: "Although Mr. Cool lacks Q*Bert's Escheresque assault on the eyes, it's a no less addicting game. [...] Mr. Cool deserves to be a sizzling hit for Sierra On-Line." In Creative Computing, Arthur Leyenberger had a similar response to the game's inspiration: "This game resembles the popular arcade game Q-Bert, but without the beautifully colored screen. That is not to say the game is not fun or challenging enough." He found that some players had difficulty using the joystick diagonals to control the character.

The Addison-Wesley Book of Atari Software 1984 gave the game an overall mediocre rating (C) and concluded: "It does require some strategy, for like Pac-Man you must take the offensive for brief periods of time. In sum, it is a well-made clone."
