= Boulder Dash: Rocks! =

2007 video game

- DS version cover art
- Developer: 10tacle Mobile GMBH
- Publishers: 10tacle Studios; QV Software; Electronic Arts
- Platforms: Nintendo DS iOS; BlackBerry; Java Platform
- Release: DS: EU: November 23, 2007; AU: February 15, 2008; Blackberry; June 26, 2009 iOS; August 29, 2009; Java Platform; September 2009
- Genre: Action game
- Modes: Single-player, multiplayer

Boulder Dash: Rocks! is an action video game by German studio 10tacle released for Nintendo DS in the PAL region. The game is a part of the Boulder Dash video game series. A PlayStation Portable version was scheduled to be released in the first quarter of 2008 but never released.

== Plot ==
The protagonist, Rockford, is collecting diamonds from a variety of themed worlds to win the heart of his girlfriend, Crystal. Tentacle, a giant octopus-like creature, is also hunting for the crystals and aims to get them before Rockford.

== Gameplay ==
The core gameplay is based on the 1984 original game, but there are a number of new additions, including a ray gun with various powers and boss battles against Tentacle, which require a different strategy to regular levels. There are also new game modes.

== Release ==
Boulder Dash: Rocks! was developed by 10tacle Mobile GMBH and published by various companies, including 10tacle Studios, OV Software, and Electronic Arts. It was originally released on the Nintendo DS on November 23, 2007 and February 15, 2008 in Europe and Australia respectively. It was later released in 2009 for Blackberry devices on June 26, on iOS devices on August 29, and on Java in September. A PlayStation Portable port was planned for release in 2008, but it never materialized.

== Reception ==
Reception

Aggregate score
Aggregator	Score
GameRankings	67%

Review scores
Publication	Score
Eurogamer	7/10
Nintendo World Report	6.5/10
Pocket Gamer	3.5/5

Nintendo World Report said the game "successfully combines arcade action with enticing puzzle elements without looking or sounding particularly good". Pocket Gamer said that it's "one of the more enjoyable puzzlers out on the DS this Christmas". Eurogamer said the game's "low-budget feel and glossy makeover makes it come across as a kids' title. But if you can look beyond all of that, this has a lot more going for it than you might initially imagine".
