= Spy vs. Spy (2005 video game) =

- Developer: Vicious Cycle Software
- Publisher: Global Star Software
- Engine: Vicious Engine
- Platforms: Xbox, PlayStation 2
- Release: Xbox: NA: April 7, 2005; PAL: April 29, 2005; PlayStation 2: PAL: April 29, 2005
- Genre: Platform
- Modes: Single-player, multiplayer

Spy vs. Spy is a video game developed by Vicious Cycle Software and published by Global Star Software. The game is based on the MAD magazine's titular comic strip. The game features the two spies ("Black" and "White") in a story mode, plus two other game modes ("Modern" and "Classic"), and a multiplayer mode for up to 4 players. The overall gameplay is a modernized version of the older Spy vs. Spy series of games in 3D environments. The game received a generally mixed reception upon release. In line with other online-enabled games on the Xbox, multiplayer on Xbox Live was available to players until April 15, 2010. Spy vs. Spy was made playable online again in 2023, on the replacement online servers called Insignia.

== Game modes ==
=== Story mode ===
In this single-player mode, the player is able to choose between Black Spy or White Spy to complete a variety of missions filled with puzzles and a cast of enemies, all of which are AI-controlled. The story presents as an extended episode of the 1960s cartoon with a modern twist. The choice of spy does not matter, as the player receives the same weapons, gadgets and missions in either campaign. The main story revolves around the two spies trying to stop the superweapon of an evil general and trying to outsmart each other along the way.

=== Modern/Classic mode ===
These modes can be played in Single player or Multiplayer. The aim of these modes is to collect 4 artifacts, (Key, Disguise, Gadget (Remote), Bucks Bag (Money Bag)) from safes around the map (and a Briefcase in Classic mode to carry all of the items) before the other spy, and then escaping in either the elevator or (in Modern mode) some unusual getaway vehicle. The winner is the player who collects all 4 artifacts from the map and then escapes. This rule applies in both Modern and Classic modes - the only difference is that the 8 Modern maps are all unique and different, but the Classic maps are more like the 1960s cartoon and the original game. The 8 Modern modes are: The Mansion, The Kooky Carnival, The Robot Factory, The Oil Rig, The Haunted House, The Volcano Lair, Area 51 & The Space Station, whereas the Classic mode increases in room size by 1 every level.

=== Other multiplayer modes ===
In this mode, two new spies are introduced: Red and Blue. These coloured spies are AI-controlled with 2 players or can be selected in 3 or 4-player mode. These are Deathmatch/Capture the Flag style games - kill all other spies and capture their flags to win, and can be played in either Modern or Classic modes.

== Reception ==
Reception

Aggregate score
Aggregator	Score	
Aggregator	PS2	Xbox
Metacritic	47/100	53/100

Review scores
Publication	Score	
Publication	PS2	Xbox
1Up.com	N/A	C
Eurogamer	N/A	4/10
GameSpot	N/A	4.3/10
GameSpy	N/A	2/5
GameZone	N/A	6/10
IGN	N/A	4.5/10
Official Xbox Magazine (US)	N/A	5.4/10
TeamXbox	N/A	6.4/10
VideoGamer.com	2/10	N/A
X-Play	N/A	2/5
Detroit Free Press	N/A	2/4
The Sydney Morning Herald	2/5	2/5

The Xbox version received "mixed" reviews, while the PlayStation 2 version received "unfavorable" reviews according to video game review aggregator Metacritic.

== Sequel and remaster ==
Around 2018, a sequel and remaster, titled Spy vs. Spy vs. Spy (or Spies) was being developed by ONIGAME team. It was put on hold for a long time until it was eventually cancelled with one of the reasons being that ONIGAME asked the rights for the game from Eric Peterson (one of the developers at Vicious Cycle Software which produced the game) but not asking the rights from DC Entertainment which owned the Spy vs. Spy IP.
