= Superman: The Game =

1985 video game

- Developer: First Star Software
- Publishers: First Star Software (US); Beyond Software; Telecomsoft; Prism Leisure (UK)
- Designer: Fernando Herrera
- Platforms: Acorn Electron, Amstrad CPC, Atari 8-bit, BBC Micro, Commodore 64, Commodore 16, ZX Spectrum
- Release: 1985
- Genre: Action-adventure
- Modes: Single-player, multiplayer

Superman: The Game is a 1985 video game designed by Fernando Herrera and published in the US by First Star Software for the Commodore 64. For European release, Superman was ported the Acorn Electron, Amstrad CPC, Atari 8-bit computers, BBC Micro, and ZX Spectrum.

== Gameplay ==
The Kryptonite combat zone (Atari 8-bit)

The game is for 2 players (or 1 vs the computer) and pits Superman against the character Darkseid. The object of the game is to save citizens of Metropolis (playing as Superman), or lure them to an underground lair (playing as Darkseid).

The game area is split into six sectors; 3 in the streets of Metropolis and 3 underground. Frantic citizens are running around the city and can be directed by deflectors (which can be set in certain directions) or by using super powers (Superman can pick up and carry citizens, Darkseid can teleport them). The players cannot leave a sector until they collect a diamond (or a number of diamonds depending on the difficulty setting). They then get to choose which sector to move to. In between each sector is a 'combat zone' mini-game and comes in a variety of styles. If the player who chose to leave the sector wins, the game moves on to the chosen sector. If they lose, play returns to the previous sector. In the sectors, the players can fire beams of set lengths (Superman uses heat vision, Darkseid fires an omega ray). If they hit, the enemy loses energy and also drops any diamonds collected. These beams are also directed by the deflectors.

The game ends when there are no more citizens running around or one of the players' energy bars is fully drained. The winner is the player who has saved (or lured) the most citizens at this point.

== Release ==
Originally released in 1985 for the Commodore 64 in the US by developer First Star Software, it was picked up in the UK by Beyond Software. Beyond also advertised conversions for the ZX Spectrum, Amstrad CPC, and Atari 8-bit computers, but not all of them made it to release. Telecomsoft released the Spectrum version for the first time at a budget price in 1986. In 1987 Prism Leisure Corporation published the game. This included all of the previous versions as well as new conversions for the Commodore 16, Plus/4, BBC Micro, and Acorn Electron. The new conversions do not contain the combat zones.

== Reception ==
Computer Entertainer praised Superman: The Game's graphics, recommending it for fans of "shoot-'em-up" arcade styled-games as a refreshing change from other adventure and strategy games on the market. Ahoy! said "there's very little original or exciting" in the game. While stating that the Metropolis levels were "far more interesting" because of "rudimentary strategy segments", the magazine concluded that Superman "never really gets off the ground".
