= Bristles (video game) =

1983 video game

- Developer: First Star Software
- Publishers: First Star Software; Statesoft (Spectrum)
- Designer: Fernando Herrera
- Programmers: Atari 8-bit Fernando Herrera; Robert Diaz; Commodore 64; Adam Bellin; ZX Spectrum; Richard Huddy
- Composer: Jerry White
- Platforms: Atari 8-bit, Commodore 64, Arcade, ZX Spectrum
- Release: 1983: Atari, C64; 1984: Arcade, Spectrum
- Genre: Platform
- Modes: Single-player, multiplayer

Bristles is a non-scrolling platform game by Fernando Herrera for Atari 8-bit computers. It was published in 1983 as the second release from the company he co-founded, First Star Software. It was ported to the Commodore 64, ZX Spectrum, and as an arcade video game using Exidy's Max-A-Flex system. As Peter the Painter, the player uses ladders and elevators move through a cutaway view of a house to paint all the walls.

== Gameplay ==
A level in progress, with Peter on the lowest floor of the house (Atari 8-bit)

The player controls Peter the Painter with the goal of painting the walls of eight different houses within a time limit. To move between the different floors Peter can ride an elevator or climb a ladder. If he gets caught in an open elevator shaft, Peter is sent to the bottom of the building.

Dangerous objects that hinder Peter's task include "flying half pints" that knock him down and "dumb buckets" that steal Peter's brush. Later levels add "Brenda the Brat", who leaves handprints all over the freshly painted walls, and the "Bucket Chucker" who never stops chasing Peter. Brenda can be pacified with a candy cane and Bucket Chucker can be temporarily trapped in a paint mixer.

The player starts with 10 brushes serving as lives and additional two brushes are added after finishing the paint job on every level.

=== Music ===
Tchaikovsky's Russian Dance (Atari 8-bit)

Bristles soundtrack uses arrangements of different pieces from Tchaikovsky's The Nutcracker Suite, Op. 71a. The main theme is II. Danses caractéristiques - a. Marche. When the player is knocked down, the game reacts with a IIc piece: Russian Dance. When Brenda is ruining freshly painted walls, piece IIe Chinese Dance is played.

== Reception ==
In a review for Antic in 1984, George Adamson wrote: "The game's action is fast and furious. It doesn't get faster in higher levels, though. Instead, Bristles offers more novel challenges". Video Games magazine wrote: "As excellent and colorful as the visuals are, the melodies throughout this contest are the real show stoppers." In a brief review, GAMES magazine concluded: "There's so much going on, and the action is so fast, that it's easy to get confused; but everything occurs strictly according to patterns that can be memorized. It may take a while to get the hang of this game, but it's a real charmer".

In a 1985 ANALOG Computing review of reduced price games, Andy Eddy cautioned, "Many users will find Bristles too difficult and demanding, as it's a very hard game to master."

== Legacy ==
In 2004, an authorized modification of the Atari 8-bit computer version was released as an Atari 5200 cartridge.
