= Cool Kids =

Cool Kids may refer to:

== Music ==
- The Cool Kids (duo), an alternative hip-hop duo
- Cool Kids, a French music group

=== Albums ===
- Cool Kids (album), a 1983 album by Kix
- Cool Kids, a 2011 EP by Natalie Walker

=== Songs ===
- "Cool Kids" (song), a 2013 song by Echosmith from their album Talking Dreams
- "Cool Kids", a 1983 song by Kix from Cool Kids
- "Cool Kids", a 1996 song by Screeching Weasel from Bark Like a Dog
- "Cool Kids", a 2010 song by Fast Romantics
- "Cool Kids", a 2012 song by Lower Than Atlantis from Changing Tune
- "Cool Kids", a 2017 song by Kwaye

== Other uses ==
- The Cool Kids (TV series), American sitcom
- Cool Kids (TV series), South Korean variety show

== See also ==
- Cool Kids Don't Cry, alternative English title for the film Achtste Groepers Huilen Niet
- Teenage Cool Kids, American indie rock group from Denton, Texas
- Cool Kids of Death, Polish alternative band
