= Steve McQueen filmography =

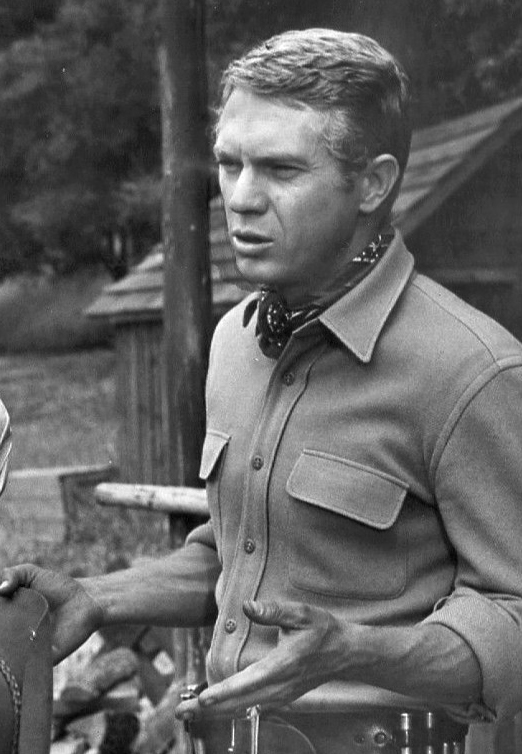
Steve McQueen as Josh Randall in Wanted Dead or Alive (1958–1961)

Steve McQueen (March 24, 1930 – November 7, 1980) was an American actor who had an extensive career in film and television. Popularly known as the "King of Cool", McQueen's screen persona was that of portraying cool, reticent antihero roles, which appealed strongly to the masses. This led him to cement his status as one of the most famous celebrities in Hollywood during the counterculture of the 1960s.

McQueen made his film debut appearing in an uncredited role in the crime drama Girl on the Run (1953), He played the uncredited role of Fidel, a member of the protagonist's gang, in Somebody Up There Likes Me (1956). In 1958, he appeared in the science fiction film The Blob, which was his first film as the lead actor. It proved to be commercially successful at the box office, grossing $4 million ($45,000,000 in 2022) against a budget of $110,000 ($1,000,000 in 2022). McQueen became known for portraying bounty hunter Josh Randall in the CBS television series Wanted Dead or Alive (1958–1961). He continued to act in films, playing the lead in The Great St. Louis Bank Robbery (1959), and in a supporting role as a corporal in Never So Few (1959), his first of three films with John Sturges.

In 1960, McQueen achieved stardom when he co-starred alongside Yul Brynner in Sturges' Western, The Magnificent Seven, which was based on Akira Kurosawa's 1954 film Seven Samurai. After a series of unsuccessful films over the next two years, McQueen teamed up with Sturges again in the war drama The Great Escape (1963), in which he played Virgil Hilts, a World War II prisoner of war who, along with fellow Allied POWs, makes an escape from a high security prisoner-of-war camp. It emerged as one of the highest-grossing films of the year, winning McQueen the award for Best Actor at the Moscow International Film Festival. In The Great Escape, a shot of Hilts riding a motorcycle and jumping a series of barbed-wire fences (performed by stuntman Bud Ekins) to escape from German soldiers is considered one of the most memorial motorcycle stunts.

McQueen received his first Golden Globe Award for Best Actor nomination for his role of a musician in Love with the Proper Stranger (1963), in which he was paired opposite Natalie Wood. He achieved critical and commercial success with The Cincinnati Kid (1965) and The Sand Pebbles (1966), the latter garnering him the only Academy Award for Best Actor nomination of his career. In 1968, McQueen appeared as millionaire Thomas Crown in the crime film The Thomas Crown Affair, and in the thriller Bullitt as the eponymous police detective Frank Bullitt. These films fared well at the box office, the latter garnering acclaim for its stunt sequences, particularly the car chase. For his performance in The Reivers (1969), McQueen earned a third Golden Globe Award nomination.

McQueen began the 1970s with the sports drama Le Mans (1971), a fictional take on the annual 24 Hours of Le Mans endurance races. The film was a critical and commercial disappointment, leaving him almost bankrupt. (Note: McQueen's production company, Solar Productions, was a shareholder in Le Mans. After the film's lackluster performance, McQueen received a notice from the Internal Revenue Service, which urged him to pay $2 million as tax. He had to make use of whatever profits he made as well as shut down his company to pay the tax.) He followed it by starring in two back-to-back films under Sam Peckinpah: the Western Junior Bonner (1972), in which he featured as the titular character, a rodeo rider, and the action film The Getaway (1972), in which he appears as an ex-conman who flees to Mexico with his wife after being double-crossed by his partners-in-crime. In the latter, he was paired opposite his second wife, Ali MacGraw. Both films were critically acclaimed. While Junior Bonner did not enjoy box office success, The Getaway went on to become one of the highest-grossing films of the year, marking a comeback for McQueen.

In 1973, he featured alongside Dustin Hoffman in the prison film Papillon playing Henri Charrière, a prisoner convicted of murder who makes an escape attempt with fellow convict Louis Dega (Hoffman). McQueen's performance earned him his fourth and final Golden Globe Award nomination in the Best Actor category. He then starred alongside Paul Newman as a SFFD chief in the disaster drama The Towering Inferno (1974). McQueen received $12 million for acting in the film, making him the highest-paid actor in the world up to that point. The film was commercially successful, grossing $139 million ($907,000,000 in 2022) against a $14 million ($91,000,000 in 2022) budget. After a four-year hiatus during which he focused on his motorcycle racing career, McQueen returned to acting when he was cast against type as a scientist in An Enemy of the People. He completed two more films before his death: Tom Horn and The Hunter (both released in 1980).

== Film ==
Film	Year	Role(s)	Notes	Ref(s)
Girl on the Run	1953	Young Man Trying to Ring the Bell	Uncredited extra	
Somebody Up There Likes Me	1956	Fidel	Uncredited role	
Never Love a Stranger	1958	Martin Cabell		
The Blob	1958	Steve Andrews	Credited as Steven McQueen	
The Great St. Louis Bank Robbery	1959	George Fowler		
Never So Few	1959	Bill Ringa		
The Magnificent Seven	1960	Vin Tanner		
The Honeymoon Machine	1961	Lieutenant Ferguson "Fergie" Howard		
Hell Is for Heroes	1962	John Reese		
The War Lover	1962	Buzz Rickson		
The Great Escape	1963	Captain Virgil Hilts (The Cooler King) (Note: McQueen played a single character in the film who has two or more different names.)		
Soldier in the Rain	1963	Sergeant Eustis Clay		
Love with the Proper Stranger	1963	Rocky Papasano		
Baby the Rain Must Fall	1965	Henry Thomas		
The Cincinnati Kid	1965	Eric Stoner (The Cincinnati Kid)		
Nevada Smith	1966	Max Sand (Nevada Smith)		
The Sand Pebbles	1966	Machinist's Mate First-Class Jake Holman	nominated for Best Actor Academy Award	
The Thomas Crown Affair	1968	Thomas Crown		
Bullitt	1968	Lieutenant Frank Bullitt		
The Reivers	1969	Boon Hogganbeck		
Le Mans	1971	Michael Delaney		
On Any Sunday	1971	Himself	Documentary film	
Junior Bonner	1972	Junior "JR" Bonner		
The Getaway	1972	Carter "Doc" McCoy		
Papillon	1973	Henri Charrière (Papillon)		
The Towering Inferno	1974	Michael O'Hallorhan		
An Enemy of the People	1978	Thomas Stockmann	Also executive producer	
Tom Horn	1980	Tom Horn	Also executive producer	
The Hunter	1980	Ralph "Papa" Thorson	final film role	

== Television ==
Title	Year	Role(s)	Notes	Ref.
Goodyear Television Playhouse	1955	Guest appearance	Episode: "The Chivington Raid"	
The United States Steel Hour	1956	Bushy	Episode: "Bring Me a Dream"	
Westinghouse Studio One	1957	Joseph Gordon	Episode: "The Defender": Part 1	
Westinghouse Studio One	1957	Joseph Gordon	Episode: "The Defender": Part 2	
The West Point Story	1957	Rick	Episode: "Ambush"	
The 20th Century Fox Hour	1957	Kinsella	Episode: "Deep Water"	
The Big Story	1957	Chuck Milton	Episode: "Car 83"	
Climax!	1958	Anthony Reeves, Henry Reeves (Note: McQueen appeared in dual roles in this episode.)	Episode: "Four Hours in White"	
Tales of Wells Fargo	1958	Bill Longley	Episode: "Bill Longley"	
Trackdown	1958	Josh Randall	Episode: "The Bounty Hunter"	
Trackdown	1958	Mal Cody, Wes Cody	Episode: "The Brothers"	
Wanted Dead or Alive	1958–1961	Josh Randall	Main role: 94 episodes	
Alfred Hitchcock Presents	1959	Bill Everett	Season 4 Episode 32: "Human Interest Story"	
Alfred Hitchcock Presents	1960	Gambler	Season 5 Episode 15: "Man from the South"	

== Bibliography ==
- Lentz, Harris M. (1996). Western and Frontier Film and Television Credits 1903-1995: Section I. Actors and actresses. Section II. Directors, producers, and writers. Jefferson, North Carolina: McFarland & Company. ISBN 978-0-7864-0217-5.
- Niemi, Robert (2013). Inspired by True Events: An Illustrated Guide to More Than 500 History-Based Films, 2nd Edition: An Illustrated Guide to More Than 500 History-Based Films. Santa Barbara, California: ABC-CLIO. ISBN 978-1-61069-198-7.
- Sanford, Christopher (2003). McQueen: The Biography. Lanham, Maryland: Taylor Trade Publications. ISBN 978-0-87833-307-3.
- Terrill, Marshall (1993). Steve McQueen: Portrait of an American Rebel. New York City: Donald I. Fine, Inc. ISBN 978-1-55611-414-4.
- Weaver, Tom (2002). Science Fiction Confidential: Interviews with 23 Monster Stars and Filmmakers. Jefferson, North Carolina: McFarland & Company. ISBN 978-0-78641-175-7.
- Wright, Kate (2004). Screenwriting is Storytelling: Creating an A-list Screenplay that Sells!. New York City: Perigee Books. ISBN 978-0-399-53024-1.
- Weddle, David (1994). If They Move...Kill 'Em! The Life and Times of Sam Peckinpah. New York City: Grove Press. ISBN 978-0-8021-1546-1.
