= Cool Change =

Cool Change may refer to:

- Cool Change (CSI), an episode of CSI: Crime Scene Investigation from 2000
- "Cool Change" (song), a 1979 hit by the Australian rock group, Little River Band
- Cold front, or cool change, leading edge of a cooler mass of air
- Cool Change (film), a 1986 action film directed by George T. Miller
