= Willem Gillisz Kool =

Dutch Golden Age painter (1608–1666)

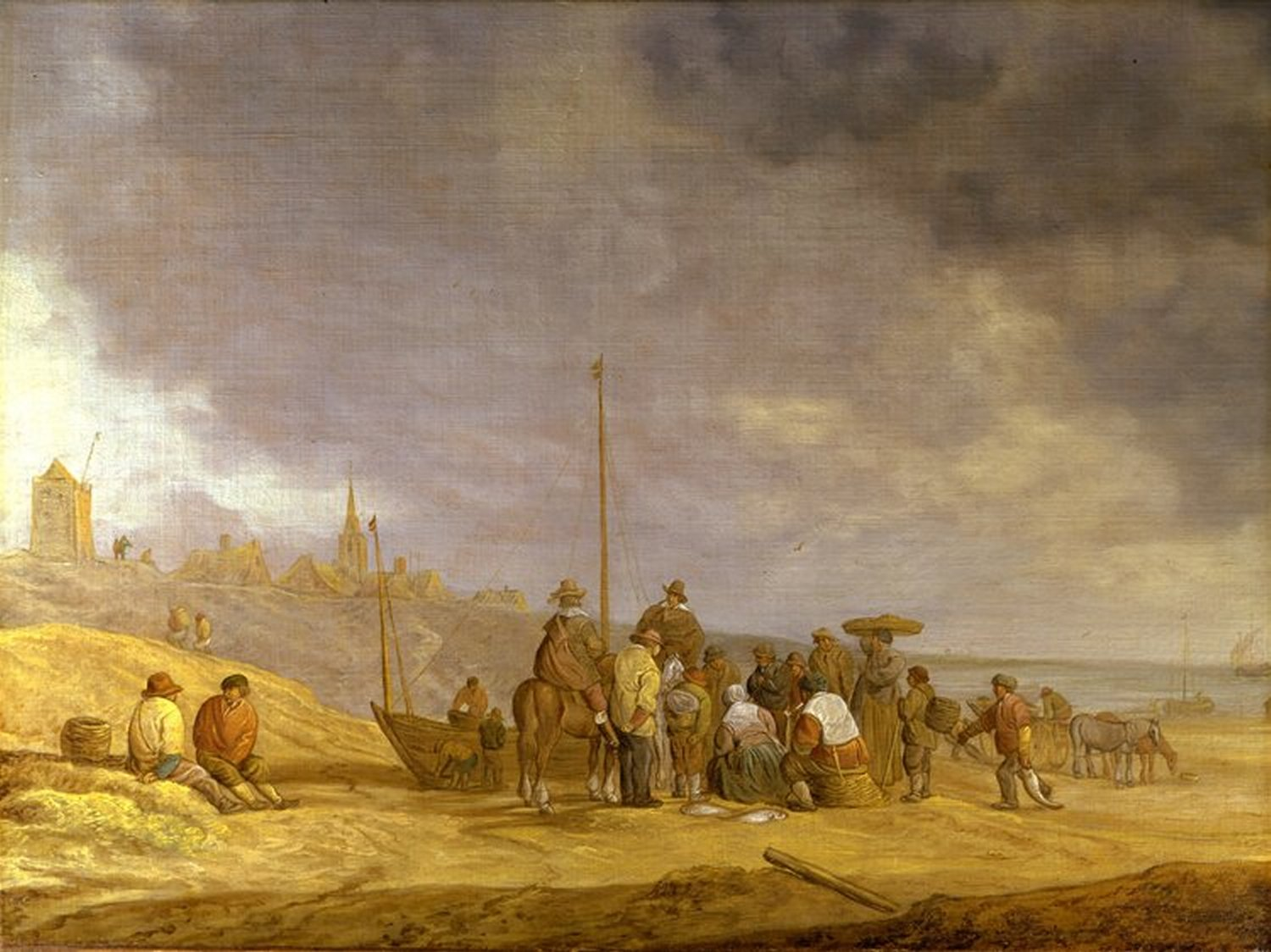
Beach scene with fisherfolk

Willem Gillisz Kool (1608 – 1666), was a Dutch Golden Age painter.

== Biography ==
He was born in Haarlem and entered the Haarlem Guild of St. Luke in 1638. In the same year he married Cornelia van der Molen, daughter of Jan Gerritsen van der Molen, on 17 januari 1638. He is known for landscapes and died in Haarlem.
