= McCool =

McCool is an Irish surname.

== People ==
Notable people with the surname include:

- Alex McCool (1923–2020), American NASA manager
- Billy McCool (1944–2014), professional baseball player
- Colin McCool (1916–1986), Australian cricket player
- Courtney McCool (born 1988), American gymnast
- Felix J. McCool (1912–1972), American Marine held as prisoner of war in both World War II and Korea
- Ken McCool (born 1998), American politician
- Michelle McCool (born 1980), American professional wrestler and diva for WWE
- Ralph W. McCool (1918–2011), American politician from Maryland
- Richard Miles McCool Jr. (1922–2008), United States Navy officer and Medal of Honor recipient
- Robert McCool (born 1973), software developer and architect, author of Apache HTTP Server.
- William Cameron McCool (1961–2003), crew member and pilot of the final mission of Space Shuttle Columbia

== Fictional characters ==
- Cool McCool, 1960s cartoon spy in an animated TV show of the same name
- Droopy McCool, fictional Star Wars character and member of the Max Rebo Band
- Harry McCool, cartoon cop in the 1960s animated TV show Cool McCool
- Tom McCool, cartoon cop in the 1960s animated TV show Cool McCool
- Orla McCool, fictional character from TV series Derry Girls
- Strait McCool, fictional mountie from animated TV series Fugget About It

== See also ==
- Fionn mac Cumhaill (aka "Finn McCool"), character from Irish mythology
- Cool (surname)
- Cools (surname)
