= Cools =

Cools (Dutch pronunciation: [ˈkoːls]) is a Dutch patronymic surname meaning "son of Cool", Cool being an archaic nickname for Nicholas. The name is particularly prominent in the Belgian province of Antwerp. People with the surname include:

- Alexander Cools (1941–2013), Dutch behavioral pharmacologist
- André Cools (1927–1991), Belgian socialist politician
- Anne Cools (born 1943), Canadian social worker
- Dion Cools (born 1996), Malaysian-Belgian footballer
- Frans Cools (1918–1999), Belgian cyclist
- Jens Cools (born 1990), Belgian football player
- Julien Cools (born 1947), Belgian football player
- Reginaldus Cools (1618–1706), Flemish Catholic bishop
- Roshan Cools (born 1975), Dutch neuroscientist
- Samantha Cools (born 1986), Canadian cyclist
- Sarah Cools (born 1997), Belgian volleyball player
- Kobe Cools (born 1997), Belgian footballer

== See also ==
- Cool (surname)
- McCool (surname)
