= Spy vs. Spy (1984 video game) =

- European C64 cover art
- Developers: First Star Software; Compile (PC-88, X1); Kemco (NES); Sega (Master System)
- Publishers: Beyond Software (UK); Tynesoft (BBC, Electron); Wicked Software (Amiga, ST); Kemco (NES, GBC); Sega (Master System)
- Designers: Mike Riedel; PC-88, X1; Satoshi Fujishima
- Programmers: C64; Mike Riedel; Atari 8-bit Jim Nangano; PC-88, X1; Takayuki Hirono
- Composers: C64; Nick Scarim; NES; Hiroyuki Masuno; PC-88, X1; Masatomo Miyamoto
- Platforms: Atari 8-bit, Commodore 64: Apple II; Amstrad CPC; ZX Spectrum; Nintendo Entertainment System; Master System; PC-88; Sharp X1; Acorn Electron; BBC Micro; Commodore 16; Amiga; Atari ST; Game Boy Color
- Release: November 1984: Atari 8-bit, Commodore 64; NA: November 1984; Apple II; NA: January 1985; Amstrad CPC, ZX Spectrum; NA: 1985; Nintendo Entertainment System; JP: April 26, 1986; NA: October 1988; PAL: July 27, 1990; Master System; JP: September 20, 1986; EU: August 1987; NA: October 1988; PC-88; JP: August 1986; Sharp X1; JP: 1986; Acorn Electron, BBC Micro, Commodore 16; UK: 1987; Amiga, Atari ST; NA: 1989; Game Boy; NA: September 1992; Game Boy Color; NA: August 1, 1999
- Modes: Single-player, multiplayer

Spy vs. Spy is a 1984 video game written by Mike Riedel for the Commodore 64 and published by First Star Software. A port for the Atari 8-bit computers was released simultaneously. It is a two-player, split-screen game, based on Mad magazine's long-running cartoon strip Spy vs. Spy, about the slapstick antics of two spies trying to kill each other with improbably elaborate traps and weapons.

It was ported to the Apple II, ZX Spectrum, Acorn Electron, Atari ST, BBC Micro, Commodore 16, Amstrad CPC, Amiga, Master System, Game Boy, Game Boy Color, and Nintendo Entertainment System. A 3D remake/remaster of the same name was released for the Xbox and PlayStation 2 in 2005.

== Gameplay ==
White Spy has just found the briefcase (Atari 8-bit).

The object of the game is to collect various secret items in a briefcase and exit the building through a door to the airport, either before the opposing player exits or before the timer runs out. During the search, traps can be laid to kill whoever triggers them, whether the opponent or the player who set them. Each spy has a personal countdown timer which depletes by 30 seconds upon each death.

The arena is an embassy, constructed from a series of interconnected rooms laid out on a grid pattern. Higher levels have more rooms and therefore a larger play area. The spies can engage in hand-to-hand combat (achieved by wiggling the joystick or directional pad left and right or up and down when the spies are in proximity to each other) as well as place traps on the furniture and doors which occupy the playing area. These traps are triggered when a spy searches a piece of furniture or opens a booby trapped door, resulting in a cartoon-style animation showing the subject being shot, blown up, etc., and floating up to heaven as an angel.

Strategy is introduced by limiting the numbers of each trap a spy can use and by allowing the traps to be triggered by either spy. Some pieces of furniture also contain 'remedies' which match up to specific traps; these allow a trap to be defused, but can only be fetched one at a time.

== Reception ==
Reception

Award
Publication	Award
Crash	Crash Smash

Video magazine described it as "a rousing action-strategy contest" and praised the game's "excellent" graphics as "befit[ting] a game so rooted in a visual medium." The reviewer also noted that "no one has more successfully captured the original feel of the source nor offered a more satisfying result". Ahoy! agreed in the Commodore 64 version's faithfulness to the original, and praised both the simultaneous two-player and one-player options. The magazine later praised the game's graphics, theme song, and humorous fatalities. Antic called it "one of the most original and clever games for the Atari computers yet". The magazine praised the simultaneous two-player display and concluded, "I cannot recommend this game highly enough." The ZX Spectrum version was rated number 20 in the Your Sinclair Official Top 100 Games of All Time, and awarded a Crash Smash in the August 1985 issue.

Computer and Video Games scored the Master System version 90% in 1989 and 88% in 1990.

The NES version sold 300,000 units in North America.

== Legacy ==
Two sequels to the original 1984 game were produced: Spy vs. Spy II: The Island Caper and Spy vs. Spy III: Arctic Antics. The third game was also released for the IBM PC. These kept the basic gameplay while tweaking some core features.

A remake, including the original version, was released for iOS in 2012, but is no longer available.
