= First Star Software =

American video game developer

First Star Software, Inc.
- Industry: Video games
- Founded: 1982
- Defunct: 2018
- Headquarters: New York City, U.S.
- Area served: Global
- Website: www.firststarsoftware.com

First Star Software, Inc. was a Chappaqua, New York based video game development, publishing and licensing company, founded by Richard Spitalny (who remains the company's president), Billy Blake, Peter Jablon, and Fernando Herrera in 1982. It is best known for the series Boulder Dash, which began on the Atari 8-bit computers, and Spy vs. Spy, which first appeared on the Commodore 64. Games were ported to or written for home computers, consoles, and later for Macintosh, Microsoft Windows, and portable devices. Millions of units have been sold in both the Boulder Dash and Spy vs. Spy series of games.

== History ==
Fernando Herrera wrote an educational program for Atari 8-bit computers, My First Alphabet, which was published by the Atari Program Exchange in 1981. That same year, Atari, Inc., created an award to honor the year's best APX submission. The first Atari Star went to My First Alphabet along with a $25,000 prize. Herrera partnered with Richard Spitalny and Billy Blake to found First Star Software. His story of winning the Atari Star made him the face of the company.

First Star's inaugural release was the Atari 8-bit computer shoot 'em up Astro Chase, which was later distributed by Parker Brothers. Herrera also wrote Bristles and Superman: The Game for First Star.

First Star's two biggest titles came from outside developers, Boulder Dash and Spy vs. Spy, each of which was the first game in a series.

As of January 1, 2018 the First Star Software name and website are owned by BBG Entertainment GmbH which also purchased all intellectual property rights pertaining to Astro Chase, BOiNG!, Boulder Dash, Bristles, Flip & Flop, Millennium Warriors, Omnicron Conspiracy, Panic Button, Rent Wars and Security Alert.

== Games ==
- Astro Chase
- Boing! (Atari 2600)
- Boulder Dash
- Bristles
- Flip & Flop
- Millennium Warriors
- Omnicron Conspiracy
- Panic Button
- Rent Wars
- Security Alert
- Spy vs. Spy
- Superman: The Game
- Superman: The Man of Steel
- U.S. Adventure
