= Boulder Dash (video game) =

1984 video game

- Developer: First Star Software
- Publisher: First Star Software
- Designers: Peter Liepa; Chris Gray
- Programmers: Peter Liepa (Atari 8-bit); Kazunori Ishiguri; Toshiyuki Sakai; Hisatada Ohta (1990 arcade)
- Composers: Peter Liepa (Atari 8-bit); Azusa Hara; Fuse (1990 arcade)
- Platform: Atari 8-bit: Acorn Electron, Amstrad CPC, Apple II, Arcade, Atari 2600, BBC Micro, ColecoVision, Commodore 64, FM-7, Game Boy, IBM PC, Intellivision, iOS, MSX, NES, PC-88, PMD 85, Super Cassette Vision, Atari ST, Amiga, ZX Spectrum, Windows, Mac, Nintendo Switch, Xbox, PlayStation, iOS, Android, Atari VCS
- Release: March 1984: Atari 8-bit; NA: March 1984; UK: August 1985; C64; NA: April 1984; UK: 1984; Apple II; NA: October 1984; PC-88; JP: October 1984; FM-7; JP: November 1984; ColecoVision; NA: December 1984; Arcade; NA: 1984; JP: August 1985; JP: May 1990 (1990 arcade); IBM PC; 1984; ZX Spectrum; UK: 1984; CPC; UK: August 1985; MSX; 1985; Super Cassette Vision; JP: 1985; BBC, Electron; UK: 1988; NES; JP: March 23, 1990; NA: June 1990; EU: 1990; Game Boy; JP: September 21, 1990; EU: 1990; Atari 2600; June 2012; iOS, Android; 2014; Intellivision; NA: March 18, 2015; Windows, Mac, Switch, Xbox September 2019; PlayStation 4/5 October 2024
- Genres: Puzzle, maze
- Mode: Single-player

Boulder Dash is a maze-based puzzle video game released in 1984 by First Star Software for Atari 8-bit computers. It was created by Canadian developers Peter Liepa and Chris Gray. The player controls Rockford, who tunnels through dirt to collect diamonds. Boulders and other objects remain fixed until the dirt beneath them is removed, then they fall and become a hazard. Puzzles are designed around collecting diamonds without being crushed and exploiting the interactions between objects (such as a butterfly turning into diamonds when hit with a falling rock). The game's name is a pun on balderdash.

Boulder Dash was ported to many 8-bit and 16-bit systems and turned into a coin-operated arcade video game. It was followed by multiple sequels and re-releases. Many games were influenced by Boulder Dash, such as Repton and direct clones like Emerald Mine, resulting in the sub-genre of rocks-and-diamonds games.

As of September 2017, BBG Entertainment owns the intellectual property rights to Boulder Dash.

== Gameplay ==
Rockford drops a series of boulders on butterflies which explode into diamonds and fall down the shafts.

Boulder Dash takes place in a series of caves, each of which is laid out as rectangular grid of blocks. The player guides the player character, Rockford, with a joystick or arrow keys. In each cave, Rockford has to collect a set number of diamonds within a time limit. Player has to avoid falling rocks and other obstacles, including amoeba, butterflies, and fireflies. When enough diamonds have been collected, the exit door opens, and going through this exit door completes the cave.

== Development ==
As an aspiring game developer, Peter Liepa reached out local publisher Inhome Software. They put him in touch with Chris Gray, who had submitted a game based on the 1982 arcade video game The Pit written in BASIC. It was not of commercial quality, but they thought it had potential. The project began with the intention of converting this game to machine language and releasing it through Inhome, but according to Liepa, the game was primitive. He decided to expand the concept and add more interesting dynamics, and wrote the new version in Forth in about six months. When it became clear that the game was worth releasing, Liepa rewrote Boulder Dash in 6502 assembly language.

Dissatisfied with the lack of a contact from Inhome Software, Liepa searched for a new publisher. He settled on First Star Software, which, according to him, was very happy to publish the game.

== Ports ==
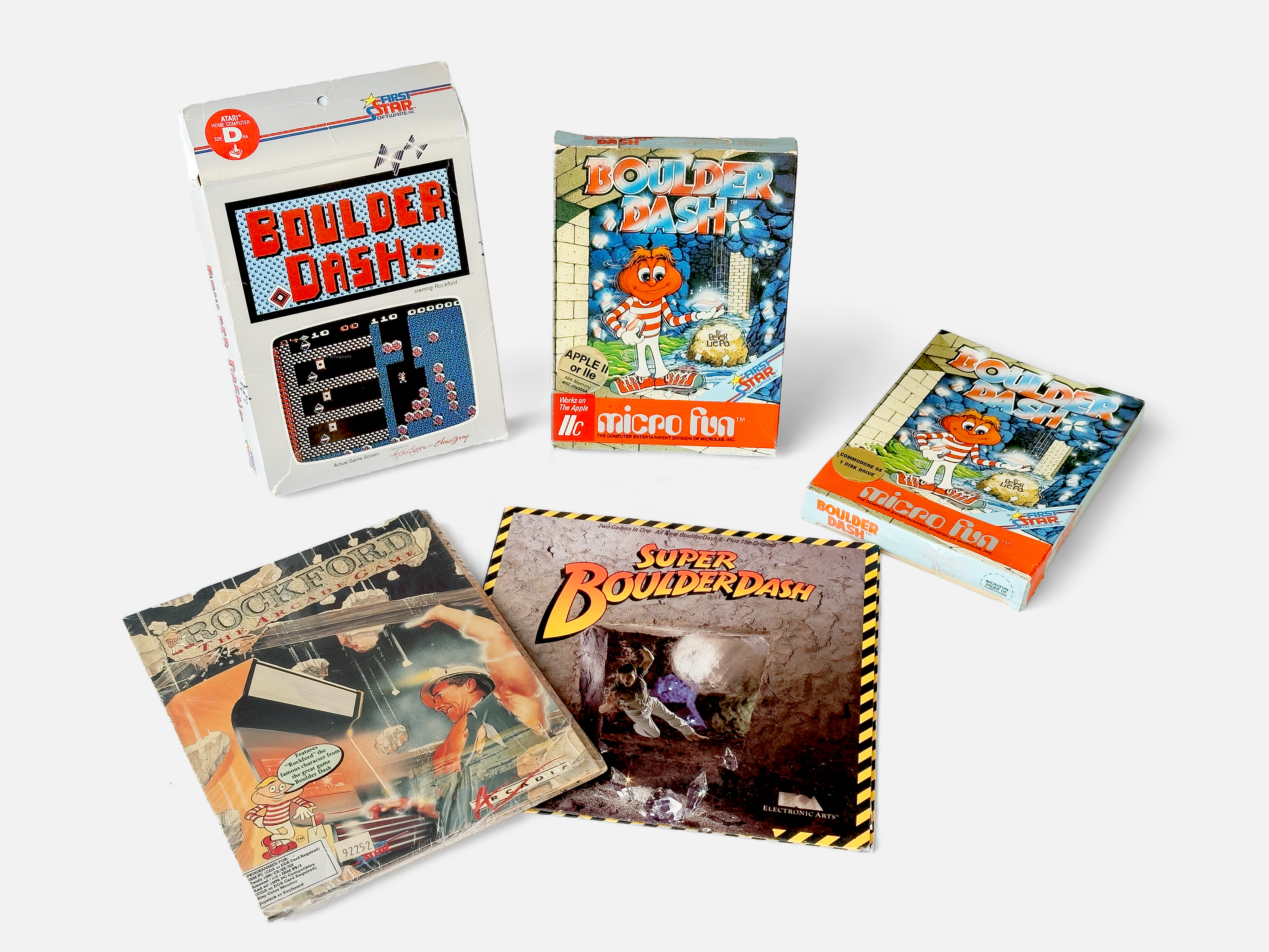
Various Boulder Dash ports from 1984 to 1988

Liepa's original Atari 8-bit version was converted by First Star to many consoles and computers. The original group of releases from 1984 was based on the Atari code and are extremely similar outside sound and graphics differences.

The game was licensed by Exidy for use with their Max-A-Flex arcade cabinet. Released in 1984, it allows buying 30 seconds of game time. This was the first home computer game to be converted to an arcade cabinet.

In 1990, a version of Boulder Dash for the Nintendo Entertainment System was developed by Data East and published in North America by JVC. It has much more cartoony graphics, additional music, an overworld map that displays between stages, and lower difficulty than the original computer version.

== Reception ==
Reception

Review scores
Publication	Score
Crash	93% (ZX Spectrum)
Computer and Video Games	34/40 (ZX Spectrum); 97% (ColecoVision)
Electronic Gaming Monthly	5/10, 6/10, 6/10, 7/10 (NES)
Sinclair User	5/10 (ZX Spectrum)
Your Sinclair	8/10 (ZX Spectrum)
Zzap!64	97% (Commodore 64)
Computer Games	B+ (home computers)
Home Computing Weekly	5/5 (ZX Spectrum)

II Computing said that "bright, colorful animation coupled with a breezy story line make this game more than just a momentary diversion". Computer Games magazine called it an "incredible addicting maze game" along the lines of Dig Dug, but faster and more exciting. Ahoy! called the "fascinating" Commodore 64 version "an entertainment classic", with excellent graphics and sound and "lots of delightful touches".

Mean Machines gave the Game Boy port of Boulder Dash a score of 90%, praising it as "one of the finest video games ever written", describing the game as "one to buy as soon as possible" and noting its faithfulness to the original Commodore 64 version. The same publication reviewed the NES version favourably, stating that it was "an extremely impressive title" and "one of the greatest games ever written". It was given a 92% rating.

The ZX Spectrum version of Boulder Dash received a positive review from Computer and Video Games magazine. The reviewer found the game's sounds and graphics to be adequate, though noted that slow screen scrolling was an issue. Despite this, the reviewer praised the game's "incredible playability" and addictive nature.

The ZX Spectrum version was placed ninth in the Your Sinclair Top 100 Speccy Games Of All Time (Ever) by journalist Stuart Campbell. In 1993, Commodore Force ranked the game at number 17 on its list of the top 100 Commodore 64 games.

IGN reviewed the Virtual Console release of the Commodore 64 version. Although the graphics and sound were both found to be dated they enjoyed the game stating that it "still feels as fresh as it did in 1984". They concluded by stating "though it doesn't look like much, Boulder Dash rocks".

Boulder Dash was included in the top 30 Commodore 64 games by C't Magazin in Germany.

The game sold more than 500,000 copies by August 1994.

== Legacy ==
Boulder Dash was the first in a long series of games:

- Boulder Dash (1985 – Arcade) – in 1985 another arcade version was released on Data East's "DECO Cassette System", with improved graphics but a reduced display grid on a vertical monitor.
- Boulder Dash II (1985) – published under several different titles; Rockford's Riot on the MSX, Rockford's Revenge on the C64. The second release in Japan was titled Champion Boulder Dash, but it is not a port of the western game.
- Boulder Dash 3 (1986 – Apple II, C64, Spectrum, PC) – monochrome space-themed graphics and poorly designed levels made this a critical failure.
- Boulder Dash Construction Kit (1986 – Apple II, C64, Spectrum, Atari 8-bit computers, Atari ST) – this release included a small number of levels (12 caves and 3 intermission levels), but was titled Boulder Dash IV – The Game for the Spectrum re-release. The title allowed players access to tools which allowed them to design their own levels.
- Super Boulder Dash (1986 – Apple II, C64, PC) – a compilation of Boulder Dash and Boulder Dash II published by Electronic Arts.
- Rockford (1988 – Arcade, Amiga, Atari 8-bit, Atari ST, Arcade, Spectrum, Amstrad, C64) - Rockford was originally a licensed arcade game produced by Arcadia Systems, and later converted to various home computer formats.
- Boulder Dash Part 2 (1990 – Arcade)
- Boulder Dash (1990 - Game Boy)
- Boulder Dash (1990 - NES)
- Boulder Dash EX (2002 – Game Boy Advance) - this one has a new "EX mode" and "Classic mode" which is a direct port of the 1984 PC version.
- Boulder Dash Xmas 2002 Edition (2002 – PC)
- GemJam Gold (2003 – PC) – the game's credits claim this is based on Boulder Dash, and is licensed by First Star.
- Boulder Dash – Treasure Pleasure (2003 – PC)
- Boulder Dash: Rocks! (2007 – DS, iOS)
- Boulder Dash Vol. 1 (2009 – iOS) - released by Chillingo and First Star Software. It includes all 80 levels of the original as well as 4 additional bonus levels.
- Boulder Dash-XL (2011 - Xbox Live Arcade, PC, iOS, 3DS)
- Boulder Dash - The Collection! (2011 – Android)
- Boulder Dash (2011 – Atari 2600) - limited edition of 250 copies.
- Boulder Dash 30th Anniversary (2014 – iOS, Android, Switch, PC, Mac) - co-published by TapStar Interactive and First Star Software, with a world designed by the original creator Peter Liepa as well as another world by TapStar CEO, Chris Gray. This sequel was developed in collaboration by TapStar Interactive, First Star Software, SoMa Play Inc. and Katsu Entertainment LLC (2014 - Android, iOS) as both a premium (paid) and a freemium game.
- Boulder Dash (2015 – Intellivision) – co-published by First Star Software, Inc. and Classic Game Publishers, Inc./Elektronite
- Boulder Dash Deluxe (2021 – Switch, Xbox, Atari VCS, Steam (PC and Mac), Windows Store and Mac Store) – developed and published by BBG Entertainment with a world designed by the original creator Peter Liepa and a Retro world with the 20 original levels from 1984.
- Boulder Dash Ultimate Collection (2022 – Switch) – developed by ININ Games and included Boulder Dash 30th Anniversary and Boulder Dash Deluxe.
- Boulder Dash 40th Anniversary (2025 – PC, Switch, Xbox One, PlayStation 4/5) – developed by BBG Entertainment in collaboration with the game's original creators. It features 180 new levels and all worlds from Boulder Dash, II, and III.
