= Collin (given name) =

Male given name

- Gender: Male

Origin
- Origin: Greek
- Meaning: "Victory of the people"

Other names
- See also: Colin

Collin is a Greek masculine name. As a derivative of Nicholas, it means "victory of the people".

Notable people with the name include:

- Collin Abranches (born 1991), Indian football (soccer) player
- Collin Altamirano (born 1995), American tennis player
- Collin Ashton (born 1983), American football linebacker
- Collin Balester (born 1986), American professional baseball pitcher
- Collin Benjamin (born 1978), Namibian football midfielder
- Collin Brooks (1893–1959), known as "CB", British journalist, writer, and broadcaster
- Collin Burns (fl. 2010s), American speedcuber
- Collin Cameron (born 1988), Canadian paralympic sitskier
- Collin Chandler (born 2003), American basketball player
- Collin Chou (born 1967), Chinese actor
- Collin Circelli (born 1981), Canadian ice hockey center
- Collin Cowgill (born 1986), American baseball outfielder
- Collin Dean (born 2005), American actor
- Collin Delia (born 1994), American ice hockey goaltender
- Collin d'Harleville (1755–1806), French dramatist
- Collin Dixon (born 2004), American football player
- Collin Drafts (born 1985), American football quarterback
- Collin Dyer, businessman and politician, member of the National Assembly of Seychelles
- Collin Edwards (born 1982), stage name Demarco, Jamaican dancehall and reggae recording artist
- Collin van Eijk (born 1991), Dutch footballer, who most recently played for Belgian side Spouwen-Mopertingen
- Collin Fernandez (born 1997), American-Peruvian soccer player
- Collin Finnerty, Duke University lacrosse player who was falsely accused of rape and kidnapping in 2006
- Collin Ryan Fitzgerald, Canadian soldier who received the Medal of Military Valour
- Collin Franklin (born 1988), American football tight end
- Collin Freeland (born 1933), Australian public servant and policymaker
- Collin Gillespie (born 1999), American college basketball player for the Villanova Wildcats
- Collin Graf (born 2002), American ice hockey player
- Collin Hansen (born 1981), American journalist and editorial director for The Gospel Coalition
- Collin Hegna, American indie rock musician
- Collin Johns (born 1993), American professional pickleball player
- Collin Johnson (born 1997), American football wide receiver
- Collin Klein (born 1989), Canadian football quarterback
- Collin Malcolm (born 1997), American basketball player in the Israeli Basketball Premier League
- Collin Martin (born 1994), American soccer player
- Collin McHugh (born 1987), American baseball pitcher
- Collin McKinney (1766–1861), American land surveyor, merchant, politician, and lay preacher
- Collin McLoughlin, American music producer, DJ, and singer
- Collin Mitchell (born 1969), Canadian curler
- Collin Mooney (born 1986), American football fullback
- Collin Morikawa (born 1997), American professional golfer
- Collin Murray-Boyles (born 2005), American basketball player
- Collin Peterson (born 1944), American politician
- Collin Pryor (born 1990), American-Icelandic basketball player
- Collin Quaner (born 1991), German football (soccer) player
- Collin Raye (born 1960), American country singer
- Collin Rogers (1791–1845), American master builder and neoclassical architect
- Collin Samuel (born 1981), Trinidad and Tobago footballer
- Collin Schlee (born 2001), American football player
- Collin Seedorf (born 1995), Dutch football player
- Collin Sexton (born 1999), American basketball player
- Collin Sixpence (born 1974), Zimbabwean sculptor
- Collin Taylor (born 1987), arena football player for the Albany Empire
- Collin Thompson, Canada-born Hong Kong–based fashion designer, filmmaker, and figure skater
- Collin van Eijk (born 1991), Dutch football player
- Collin Walcott (1945–1984), North American musician
- Collin Wilcox (actress) (1935–2009), American actress
- Collin Wilcox (writer) (1924–1996), American mystery writer
- Collin Williams (born 1961), Zimbabwean first-class cricketer
- Collin H. Woodward (died 1927), New York City politician
- Collin Wright (born 2003), American football player

== See also ==
- Colin (given name)
- Collin (surname)
