= Colin (given name) =

- Pronunciation: /ˈkɒlɪn, ˈkoʊlɪn/ KOL-in, KOH-lin
- Gender: masculine

Origin
- Meaning: (1) short for Nicolas (victory of the people); (2) Old Irish cuilen "pup, cub".

Other names
- See also: Collin

Colin is an English-language masculine given name. It has two distinct origins:

1. A diminutive form of "Colle", itself an Old French short form of the name Nicolas. This name, but not the anglicized Gaelic name, is also found in the spelling Collin. This name is formed by the Old French diminutive suffix -in also found in Robin.
2. An anglicisation of the Irish given name Coileán or the Scottish Gaelic name Cailean, which both come from the Old Irish word cuilén "pup, cub". The Scottish Gaelic name is recorded in the spelling Colin from as early as the 14th century. MacCailean was a patronymic used by Clan Campbell, after Cailean Mór (died 1296).

As a surname, Colin can be derived from the given name, but can also be of unrelated (French) origin. The Irish patronymic Ó Coileáin gave rise to the surname Cullen (which is also the anglicization of the unrelated patronymic Ó Cuilinn).

In England and Wales, Colin was one of the Top 100 most commonly given male names for most of the 20th century but declined greatly at the end of the century and since. It rose steadily from 96th in 1904 to 82nd in 1914, 61st in 1924, 26th in 1934 and 15th in 1944. It then declined to 22nd in 1954, 25th in 1964, 44th in 1974 and 67th in 1984. The decline then accelerated and Colin ranked 319th most popular name England and Wales in 1996 and 684th most popular in 2014. It has been moderately popular in the United States and was listed in the top 100 boys names in the U.S. in 2005. In Scotland it ranked 302 in 2014, but in Ireland it is more popular, ranking 88th in 2006.

In the US, Colin peaked in 2004 at rank 84, but has substantially declined since (rank 196 as of 2016). The form Collin reached the peak of its popularity somewhat earlier, at rank 115 in 1996, and has declined to rank 298 as of 2016. Taken together, the names Colin and Collin accounted for 0.16% (about 1 in 620) of boys named in the US in 2016, down from 0.4% (one in 250) in 2004.

== People called Colin ==
=== Medieval and early modern ===
- Cuilén mac Ildulb (died 971), King of Alba
- Cailean Mór (died 1296), Scottish chief, progenitor of Clan Campbell
- Colin Campbell, 1st Earl of Argyll (died 1493)
- Colin Campbell, 3rd Earl of Argyll (died 1529)
- Colin Campbell, 6th Earl of Argyll (died 1584)

=== Modern ===
==== A–G ====
- Colin Addison (1940–2025), English football player and manager
- Colin Alevras (1971–2022), American restaurateur
- Colin Allred (born 1983), American politician
- Colin Bailie (born 1964), Northern Ireland footballer
- Colin Baker (born 1943), British actor
- Colin Barber (baseball) (born 2000), American baseball player
- Colin Bean (1926–2009), British actor
- Colin Bell, several people
- Colin Blakely (1930–1987), Irish actor
- Colin Blanchard (born 1970), English paedophile convicted in the 2009 Plymouth child abuse case
- Colin Bland (1938–2018), South African cricketer
- Colin Blunstone (born 1945), English singer from the Zombies
- Colin Braun (born 1988), American race car driver
- Colin Burgess (musician) (born 1946), Australian Musician
- Colin C. Berry, Canadian actor
- Colin Cairnes, Australian film director and writer
- Colin Calderwood (born 1965), Scottish footballer, coach and manager
- Colin Campbell Mitchell (1925–1996), British Army lieutenant-colonel and politician
- Colin Campbell, 1st Baron Clyde, (1792–1863) Scottish soldier
  - See Colin Campbell (disambiguation) for more people with this name
- Colin Cassady (born 1986), American professional wrestler
- Colin Chapman (1928–1982), English founder of Lotus Cars
- Colin Clark (disambiguation)
- Colin Clive (1900–1937), British-American actor
- Colin Coates (born 1946), Australian ice speed skater
- Colin Campbell Cooper (1856–1937), American painter
- Colin Cowdrey (1932–2000), English cricketer
- Colin Cowherd (born 1964), American sports radio personality
- Colin Croft (born 1953), West Indian cricketer
- Colin Crouch (born 1944), British political scientist
- Colin Cunningham (swimmer) (born 1954), British swimmer
- Colin Cunningham (born 1966), American film and TV actor
- Colin Dagba (born 1998), French Footballer
- Colin Davis (1927–2013), English conductor
- Colin Delaney (born 1986), American professional wrestler
- Colin Dowdeswell (born 1955), Rhodesian, Swiss, and British tennis player
- Colin Edwards (born 1974), American motorcycle racer
- Colin Edwin (born 1970), Australian musician
- Colin Egglesfield (born 1973), American actor
- Colin Emerle (born 1979), American musician
- Colin Falvey (born 1985), Irish footballer
- Colin Farrell (born 1976), Irish actor
- Colin Ferguson (born 1972), Canadian actor
- Colin Ferguson (mass murderer), American mass murderer
- Colin Firth (born 1960), British actor
- Colin Ford (1996), American actor
- Colin Fox (actor) (1938–2025), Canadian actor
- Colin Furze (born 1979), British YouTuber
- Colin Gardner (c. 1940 – 2010), English football official and philanthropist
- Colin Greening (born 1986), Canadian pro hockey player
- Colin Greenwood (born 1969), English bassist for rock band Radiohead
- Colin Griffiths (born 1983), English comedian

==== H–Z ====
- Colin Hanks (born 1977), American actor
- Colin Hay (born 1953), Scottish-Australian lead singer of Men at Work
- Colin Heathcock (born 2005), American fencer
- Colin Hendry (born 1965), Scottish footballer
- Colin Heydt, American philosopher
- Colin Holba (born 1994), American football player
- Colin Huggins (born 1978), American classical pianist and busker
- Colin Ireland (1954–2012), British serial killer
- Colin Jackson (born 1967), Welsh hurdler
- Colin Jost (born 1982), American comedian, screenwriter, and TV actor
- Colin Kaepernick (born 1987), American NFL football player
- Colin Kelly (1915–1941), American aviator and WWII hero
- Colin Kroll (died 2018), American internet entrepreneur
- Colin Lane (born 1965), Australian comedian
- Colin Mackenzie, (1754–1821), Scottish soldier and surveyor
  - See Colin Mackenzie (disambiguation) for more people with this name
- Colin Maclaurin (1698–1746), Scottish mathematician
- Colin Mason (1926–2020), New Zealand-Australian politician and writer
- Colin Mathura-Jeffree (born 1972), New Zealand actor/model/celebrity
- Colin McAllister (born 1968), Scottish interior designer and TV presenter
- Colin McCahon (1919–1987), New Zealand artist
- Colin McComb (born 1970), American game designer
- Colin McFarlane (born 1961), English actor
- Colin McGinn (born 1950), British philosopher
- Colin McLoughlin, British freelance writer
- Colin McRae (1968–2007), Scottish rally driver
- Colin Meads (1936–2017), New Zealand rugby union player
- Colin Meloy (born 1974), American guitarist and singer in The Decemberists
- Colin Milner Smith (1936–2020), English cricketer and judge
- Colin Mochrie (born 1957), Scottish Canadian actor/improv comedian
- Colin Montgomerie (born 1963), Scottish golfer
- Colin Morgan (born 1986), Irish actor
- Colin Moulding (born 1955), bassist and singer for band XTC
- Colin Murdoch (1929–2008), New Zealand medical inventor
- Colin Murray (born 1977), British radio DJ and television presenter
- Colin Needham (born 1967), founder of the Internet Movie Database
- Colin Newman (born 1954), singer and guitarist
- Colin O'Donoghue (born 1981), Irish actor
- Colin Pillinger (1943–2014), British planetary scientist
- Colin Powell (1937–2021), U.S. Secretary of State
- Colin Quinn (born 1959), American comedian
- Colin Raston (born 1950), Australian chemist and Ig Nobel Laureate
- Colin Reitz (born 1960), British long-distance runner
- Colin Reynolds, Canadian politician
- Colin Richardson, music producer
- Colin Henderson Roberts (1909–1990), British classical scholar and publisher
- Colin P. Rourke (1943–2024), British mathematician
- Colin Schooler (born 1997), American football player
- Colin Slade (born 1987), New Zealand rugby union player
- Colin Simmons (born 2006), American football player
- Colin Stagg, man wrongly imprisoned in the Rachel Nickell murder case
- Colin Touchin (1953–2022), British musician and conductor
- Colin Townsley (1942–1987), firefighter and George Medal recipient
- Colin Thompson (disambiguation), several people
- Colin Thorne (born 1952), British academic
- Colin Turnbull (1924–1994), sociologist and author
- Colin Vearncombe (1962–2016), singer known as Black
- Colin Ward (1924–2010), political writer
- Colin Watkinson, British cinematographer
- Colin Welland (1934–2015), British actor and screenwriter
- Colin West (born 1962), English football player and coach
- Colin West (author) (born 1951), English children's author and illustrator
- Colin West (footballer, born 1967), English football player
- Colin Wilson (1931–2013), British writer
  - See Colin Wilson (disambiguation) for more people with this name
- Colin Winter (1928–1981), bishop
- Colin Winchester (1933–1989), assistant commissioner in the Australian Federal Police
- Colin Woodell (born 1991), American actor
- Colin Young (Born 2007), a Scottish video game developer.

== Fictional characters ==
- Colin, a character from the 1965 film Repulsion
- Colin, the titular character of the English comic series Colin the Vet
- Colin, a character in the 2006 video game Need for Speed: Carbon
- Colin, an anthropomorphic computer from Don't Hug Me I'm Scared
- Colin Creevey, a character from the Harry Potter series
- Colin Craven, a character from The Secret Garden by Frances Hodgson Burnett
- Colin Clout, poetic folk figure, appearing first in the works of John Skelton and later in many works by Edmund Spenser
- Colin Evans, main antagonist of the 2014 film No Good Deed
- Colin Frater, a character from Ip Man 4: The Finale
- Colin Mallory, a main character in the television series Sliders
- Colin Robinson, a character from What We Do in the Shadows
- Colin Bridgerton, third son of Bridgerton family from Bridgerton series
- Colin Ritman, a character from 2018 interactive film Black Mirror: Bandersnatch

== See also ==
- Colin (surname)
- Colin (disambiguation)
- List of Scottish Gaelic given names
- List of Irish-language given names
- Collin (disambiguation)
- Cullen (surname)
- Cullinane (name)
