= Colin (surname) =

Colin is a surname, variously derived including the given name Colin and the common name in French of some species of bird and fish.

- Alexander Colin or Colyn (1527/29–1612), Flemish sculptor
- Alexandre-Marie Colin (1798–1875), French painter of historical and genre subjects
- André Colin (1910–1978), French politician
- Andrew Colin (born 1936), British professor of computer science
- Andrew Colin (financial analyst), Australian specialist in portfolio theory
- Christie Colin (born 1982) American archer
- Denis Colin (born 1956), French bass clarinettist and composer
- Enrique Colin (born 1982), Mexican professional boxer
- Fabrice Colin (born 1972), French author of fantasy, science fiction, and magic realism
- Frédéric-Louis Colin (1835–1902), French-Canadian priest and educator
- Georges Colin (1880–1945), French actor
- Gerald Colin (1913–1995), Irish priest, Bishop of Grimsby, England
- Grégoire Colin (born 1975), French actor, producer, screenwriter, and director
- Gustave Colin (1814–1880), French politician.
- Gustave-Henri Colin (1828–1910), French painter.
- Héloïse Colin (1819–1873), French watercolorist
- Ian Colin (1910–1987), British film and television actor
- Jean Colin (disambiguation)
- Jean-Claude Colin (1790–1875), French priest, founder of the Society of Mary
- Jürgen Colin (born 1981), Dutch professional footballer
- Kathryn Colin (born 1974), American sprint canoer
- Letícia Colin (born 1989), Brazilian actress, singer and television presenter
- Margaret Colin (born 1958), American actress
- Maxime Colin (born 1991), French football player
- Mike Colin (born 1971), American Recording Artist
- Nathalie Colin (born 1966), French jewellery designer
- Paul Colin (disambiguation)
- Philippe Colin (born 1979), French sprint canoer
- Richarno Colin (born 1987), Mauritian boxer
- Sid Colin (1920–1989), English screenwriter
- Vladimir Colin, pen-name of Jean Colin (1921–1991), Romanian short story writer and novelist

== See also ==
- Collin (disambiguation)
