= Collin (surname) =

Collin is a French-language surname.

== Geographical distribution ==
As of 2014, 47.6% of all known bearers of the surname Collin were residents of France (frequency 1:2,853), 10.7% of Belgium (1:2,197), 10.2% of Canada (1:7,383), 6.7% of the United States (1:110,104), 4.3% of England (1:26,326), 3.0% of Sweden (1:6,653), 2.9% of South Africa (1:37,430), 1.6% of Germany (1:101,299), 1.1% of Malaysia (1:55,995), 1.0% of Australia (1:49,632) and 1.0% of Papua New Guinea (1:17,312).

In Belgium, the frequency of the surname was higher than national average (1:2,197) only in one region: Wallonia (1:892).

In France, the frequency of the surname was higher than national average (1:2,853) in the following regions:

1. Grand Est (1:1,055)
2. Brittany (1:1,360)
3. Bourgogne-Franche-Comté (1:1,705)
4. Centre-Val de Loire (1:2,101)
5. Île-de-France (1:2,846)

In Sweden, the frequency of the surname was higher than national average (1:6,653) in the following counties:

1. Örebro County (1:3,100)
2. Södermanland County (1:4,363)
3. Gävleborg County (1:4,376)
4. Kronoberg County (1:4,784)
5. Västmanland County (1:5,086)
6. Stockholm County (1:5,419)
7. Dalarna County (1:5,954)
8. Östergötland County (1:5,994)

== People ==
- Abel Collin (1653–1705), benefactor in Nottingham, England
- Adam Collin (born 1984), English footballer
- Albéric Collin (1886–1962), Belgian sculptor
- Amanda Collin (born 1986), Danish actress
- Anton Collin (1891–1973), Finnish cross country skier
- Aurélien Collin (born 1986), French footballer
- Birgit Collin-Langen (1956–2026), German politician, MEP
- Charles Jean Baptiste Collin-Mezin (1841–1923), French maker of violins, violas, cellos, basses, bows
- Christen Collin (1857–1926), Norwegian literary historian
- Dieter Collin (1893–1918), German flying ace in World War I
- Édouard Collin (born 1987), French actor
- Elsa Collin (1887–1941), Swedish theatre critic, poet and actress
- Fernand Collin (1897–1990), Belgian businessman
- Francis Collin (born 1987), English professional footballer
- Françoise Collin (1928–2012), Belgian novelist, philosopher and feminist
- Frank Collin (born 1944) formerly served as the leader of the National Socialist Party of America
- Frederick Collin (1850–1939), New York judge
- Frédérique Collin (born 1944), Canadian actress, screenwriter and film director
- George Collin (1905–1989), English footballer
- George H. Collin (1856–1938), American politician in the state of Washington
- Hannah Collin (born 1982), English former professional tennis player
- Heinrich Joseph von Collin (1771–1811), Austrian dramatist
- Hialmar Collin (1891–1987), Danish diplomat
- Hyacinthe Collin de Vermont (1693–1761), French painter
- Jacques Collin de Plancy (1793–1881), French occultist, demonologist and writer
- James Edward Collin (1876–1968), English entomologist
- Jean Christophe Collin (1754–1806), French general of cavalry
- John Collin (disambiguation)
- Joseph Henry Collin (1893–1918), English soldier, recipient of the Victoria Cross
- Kasper Collin (born 1972), Swedish film director, filmmaker, screenwriter, film producer
- Keith Collin (1937–1991), British diver
- Luc Collin, pen name Batem (born 1960), Belgian comics artist
- Marc Collin, French musician, film music composer and record producer
- Marcus Collin (1882–1966), artist from Finland
- Mary Collin (1860–1955), English teacher and campaigner for women's suffrage
- Matthäus Casimir von Collin (1779–1824), Austrian poet
- Maxime Collin (born 1979), Canadian actor and business owner
- Ottilie Collin (1863–1960), Austrian soprano
- Paul Collin (1843–1915), French poet, writer, translator and librettist
- Philipp Collin (born 1990), German male former volleyball player
- Raphaël Collin (1850–1916), French painter and teacher
- Richard Collin (1626–1698), engraver from Luxembourg
- Richard H. Collin (1932–2010), American historian and food writer
- Robbie Collin, British film critic
- Robert E. Collin (1928–2010), Canadian American electrical engineer and professor
- Rodney Collin (1909–1956), British writer in the area of spiritual development
- Tom Collin (1911–2003), English cricketer
- Victor Collin de Plancy (1853–1924), French diplomat, bibliophile, and art collector
- Xavier Collin (born 1974), French former professional footballer
- Yvon Collin (born 1944), member of the Senate of France

== See also ==
- Collin (disambiguation)
- Colin (surname)
- Collins (surname)
