= Collin River =

Collin River may refer to:

- Collin River (Chile)
- Collin River (Mégiscane River tributary), Quebec, Canada
