= Heydt =

Heydt is a surname. Notable people with the surname include:

- Colin Heydt, American philosopher
- Dorothy J. Heydt, American writer
- Francis Heydt (1918–2008), American swimmer
- Gerald T. Heydt, American electrical engineer
- Louis Jean Heydt (1903–1960), American actor
- Martin Heydt, American businessman

Fictional characters with the name include:

- Reinhard Heydt, the antagonist of the prolific terrorist cell in the Maj Sjöwall & Per Wahlöö novel The Terrorists.

== See also ==
- Von der Heydt
