= Colling =

Colling is a surname. Notable people with the surname include:

- Belinda Colling (born 1975), New Zealand netball and basketball player
- Émile Colling (1899–1981), Luxembourgian doctor and politician
- François Colling (1940–2024), Luxembourgish engineer and politician
- Gary Colling (born 1950), Australian rules footballer
- James Kellaway Colling (1816–1905), English artist and architect
- Lin Colling (1946–2003), New Zealand rugby union player
- Nancie Colling (1919–2020), English lawn bowls competitor
- Richard G. Colling, biologist
- Robert Colling (1749–1820), English cattle breeder

== See also ==
- Colling, Michigan, unincorporated community in Tuscola County, Michigan, United States
- Collin (disambiguation)
- Cooling (disambiguation)
