= Colin Campbell =

Colin Campbell may refer to:

== Scottish history ==
- Cailean Mór (died after 1296), also known as Sir Colin Campbell, or "Colin the Great"
- Sir Colin Og Campbell of Lochawe (died before 1343), Lord of Lochawe
- Colin Campbell (Swedish East India Company) (1686–1757), Scottish merchant and founder of the Swedish East India Company
- Colin Roy Campbell of Glenure (c. 1708–1752), also known as the "Red Fox", killed in the Appin Murder, subject of Kidnapped by Robert Louis Stevenson
- Sir Colin Campbell, 1st Baron Clyde (1792–1863), Scottish soldier

== Scottish nobility ==
- Colin Campbell, 1st Earl of Argyll (c. 1433–1493), Scottish nobleman
- Colin Campbell, 3rd Earl of Argyll (c. 1486–1535), Scottish nobleman and soldier
- Colin Campbell, 6th Earl of Argyll (1541/46–1584), Scottish nobleman and politician
- Sir Colin Campbell, 2nd Baronet (1577–1640), Scottish nobleman
- Sir Colin Campbell, 1st Baronet, of Lundie (died c. 1650), Scottish noble
- Colin Campbell, 7th Earl Cawdor (born 1962), Scottish earl and architect
- Lord Colin Campbell (1853–1895), MP, younger son of eighth Duke of Argyll
- Colin Campbell of Glenorchy (1499–1583), Scottish courtier and landowner

== Politics and law ==
- Sir Colin Campbell, 1st Baronet, of Ardkinglass (c. 1640–1709), Scottish politician
- Colin Campbell (probate judge) (1752–1834), lawyer, probate judge, customs official in Nova Scotia
- Sir Colin Campbell (British Army officer, born 1776) (1776–1847), governor of Nova Scotia and Ceylon
- Colin Campbell (Nova Scotia politician) (1822–1881), merchant and politician in Nova Scotia, American
- Colin H. Campbell (1859–1914), provincial cabinet minister in Manitoba, Canada
- Colin Campbell (Ontario politician) (1901–1978), Canadian politician, member of parliament, president of the International Curling Federation
- Colin Campbell (Scottish politician) (born 1938), member of the Scottish Parliament
- Colin Campbell, Lord Malcolm (born 1953), Scottish judge
- Colin Minton Campbell (1827–1885), British member of parliament for North Staffordshire
- Colin P. Campbell (1877–1956), speaker of the Michigan House of Representatives
- Colin Campbell (Australian politician) (1817–1903), pastoralist and politician in colonial Victoria

== Education and academia ==
- Colin Campbell (legal scholar) (1944–2022), British academic lawyer and vice-chancellor of the University of Nottingham
- Colin G. Campbell (1935–2024), American educator, president of Wesleyan University
- T. Colin Campbell (born 1934), American biochemist and nutritionist

== Science ==
- Colin Campbell (geologist) (1931–2022), British petroleum geologist
- Colin Campbell (astronomer) (died 1752), Scottish astronomer
- Colin Campbell (sociologist) (born 1940), British sociologist

== Sport ==
- Colin Campbell (sportsman, born 1872) (1872–1907), Australian footballer and cricketer
- Colin Campbell (footballer, born 1883) (active in 1907–1910), footballer for both Argentina and Chile
- Colin Campbell (footballer, born 1918) (1918–2003), Australian footballer for Collingwood
- Colin Campbell (footballer, born 1956), Scottish association football player
- Colin Campbell (cricketer, born 1977), English cricketer
- Colin Campbell (cricketer, born 1884) (1884–1966), Scottish-born New Zealand cricketer
- Colin Campbell (field hockey) (1887–1955), British Olympic field hockey player
- Colin Campbell (ice hockey, born 1953), Canadian ice hockey player, coach and executive
- Colin Campbell (ice hockey, born 1991), Canadian professional ice hockey player
- Colin Campbell (sportsman, born 1946) (1946–2024), British runner and bobsledder

== Arts ==
- Colen Campbell (1676–1729), Scottish neo-Palladian architect
- Colin Campbell (director) (1859–1928), Scottish-born film director, writer, actor and producer
- Colin Campbell (artist) (1942–2001), Canadian artist
- Lady Colin Campbell (born 1949), Jamaican-born British writer and biographer
- Colin Campbell (actor) (1937–2018), English actor
- Col Campbell (1933–2012), presenter on Gardening Australia

== Others ==
- Colin Campbell (murderer) (born 1946 or 1947), British double murderer, convicted of the cold case 1981 murder of Claire Woolterton in 2013
- Colin Campbell (farmer) (c. 1857–1932), British farmer
- Colin Campbell, 1st Baron Colgrain (1866–1954), British banker
- Colin "Caesar" Campbell, (1946–2021), Australian outlaw biker and gangster.
- Colin Campbell (Canadian bishop) (1931–2012), Catholic bishop of Antigonish
- Colin Campbell (New Zealand bishop) (born 1941), Catholic bishop of Dunedin
- Colin Campbell (British Army officer, born 1754) (1754–1814), British Army general
- Colin Campbell (entrepreneur), Canadian 21st century serial Internet entrepreneur
- Colin Campbell, first major-commandant of the 100th Regiment of Foot
- Colin Campbell (British priest) (1863–1916), Archdeacon of Wisbech
- Colin Campbell (River City), fictional soap opera character

== Fiction ==
- Colin Campbell, protagonist of The Cat Who Walks Through Walls, a 1985 novel by Robert A. Heinlein

== Ships ==
- Sir Colin Campell of Peterhead, best known under her later name Danmark of Copenhagen
