= Cullinane =

Cullinane may refer to:

- Cullinane (name). including a list of people with the name
- Cullinane, Queensland, a locality in the Cassowary Coast Region, Australia
- Cullinane Corporation (Cullinet), a former software company from Westwood, Massachusetts
- Cullinane College, Wanganui, a college in New Zealand

== See also ==
- Cullinane v McGuigan, a New Zealand case relating to breach of contract
