= Kolin =

Kolin may refer to:

== Places ==
- Kolín, a town in the Czech Republic
  - Kolín District
- Starý Kolín, a municipality and village in the Czech Republic
- Kolin, Louisiana, an unincorporated community
- Kolin, an unincorporated community in Judith Basin County, Montana
- Kolin, West Pomeranian Voivodeship, a village in Poland
- Koleyn, Tehran, also romanized as Kolīn, a village in Iran

== People ==
- David Kolin (born 1958), American TV and radio personality
- Ivo Kolin (1924–2007), Croatian economist, engineer and inventor
- Sacha Kolin (1911–1981), French-American painter
- Kuldip Singh Dhillon, also known as Kolin Dhillon (1950–2023), British property developer

== Other ==
- Kolin (Street Fighter), a fictional character

== See also ==
- Kollin, a personal name
- Colin (disambiguation)
