= Louis-Benoît Picard =

French playwright, actor, novelist, poet and music director

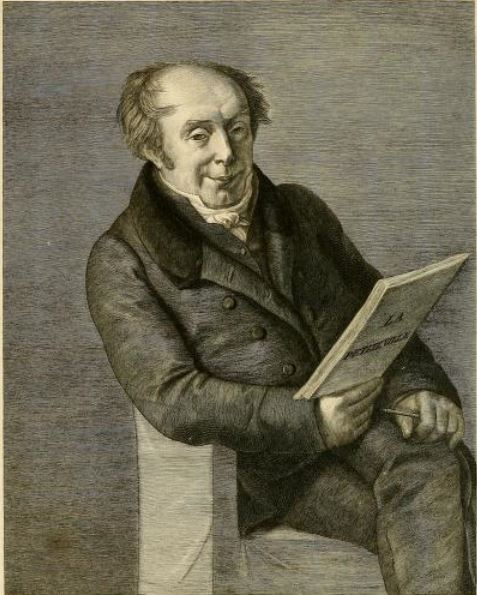
Louis-Benoît Picard

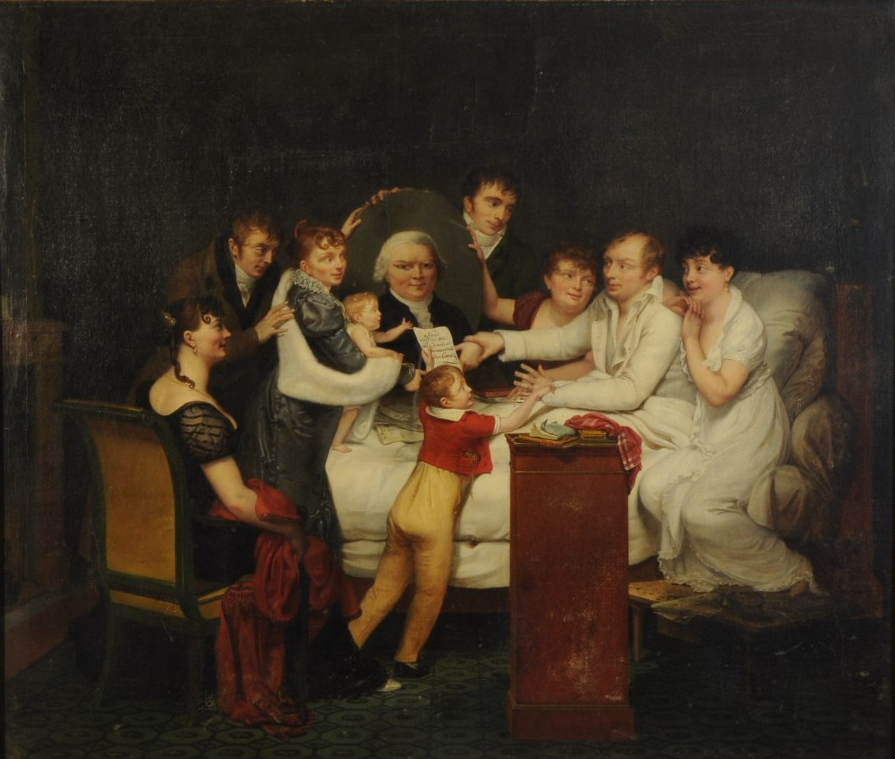
Pauline Auzou, Louis-Benoît Picard and his family, 1807, shown at the 1808 Paris Salon. Within the painting is a portrait of Pickard Elder, for which she won a medal in the 1806 Paris Salon.

Louis-Benoît Picard (29 July 1769 in Paris – 31 December 1828 in Paris) was a French playwright, actor, novelist, poet and music director.

== Biography ==
Son of a lawyer, and nephew of a doctor, Picard refused to follow the careers of law and medicine, and dedicated himself to the theater encouraged by his friend François Andrieux. He first became an actor before producing his first play, Le Badinage dangereux, in 1789.

Picard worked with the Comédiens-Italiens. In 1807 Picard was received by Bernardin de Saint-Pierre when he was elected to the Académie française. Before he became the head of the Odéon-Théâtre in 1816, he directed the Académie Impériale de Musique. He was at Odéon-Théâtre until 1821.

In the painting Louis-Benoît Picard and his family, Pauline Auzou depicts Picard with his wife Victoria Longchamps (far right), his brother and sisters Latour and Adele Picard and Mrs. Guersant. With Mrs. Guersant is her husband physician Louis Benoit Guersant, their son, Paul Benedict Guersant Louis, who became a doctor, and baby daughter who became Ms. Blache. LaTour's wife wore a red shawl over a black dress. The Picard's father, who had been a lawyer and parliamentarian, is represented in a portrait made by Auzou, which won a medal of honor at the 1806 Paris Salon. His writing desk holds his manuscripts and a book he is reading.

== Works ==
- Les Visitandines (put on at the Théâtre Feydeau on 7 August 1792, with music by François Devienne)
- La vraie bravoure (1793)
- Médiocre et rampant (1797)
- Le Collatéral (1799)
- Les Provinciaux à Paris (1801)
- Le Contrat d'union (1801)
- La Petite Ville (1801)
- Les voisins (1802)
- Les conjectures (1802)
- Le vieux comédien (1803)
- La Noce sans Mariage (1805)
- Le Susceptible (1805)
- Les oisifs (1809)
- Un lendemain de fortune, ou Les embarras du bonheur (1811)
- Un jeu de la fortune, ou Les marionnettes (1821)
