= Cullinane (name) =

The Irish surname Cullinane, Ó Cuilleanáin or Ó Cuilleannáin may refer to:

Surname: The name seems to be related to Cullen. While Cullen is encountered primarily in Dublin and southeast Ireland, Cullinan/Cullinane used almost exclusively in western Ireland on a north–south-Axis from County Galway to County Cork.

Notable persons of the name are:

- Charlie Cullinane (born 1945), Irish Sportsman
- David Cullinane (born 4 July 1974), Sinn Féin TD in Waterford
- Sir Frederick Fitzjames Cullinan (born County Clare, 1845–1913), Principal Clerk of the Chief Secretary's Office, Dublin Castle
- Joanna Cullinane, New Zealand professor of organisational studies at Massey University
- John Cullinan, Nationalist MP for Tipperary elected in 1900, remained in Westminster until 1918.
- John Cullinane, founder of Cullinet, an early software company.
- Majella Cullinane, New Zealand writer and poet
- The four nationalist Cullinane sisters of Newtown Kilmacthomas, County Waterford: eldest sister Mary (later Power), Katie (Kent), Hannah Imelda (Power) and Bridget Cullinane, active in the period after 1916.
- Maurice Cullinane (1932–2023), Washington, D.C., Police Chief and subject of a Pulitzer Prize–winning photograph and subsequent sculpture
- Seán Cullinane (Séán Ó Cuilleannáin) (born 1969), Irish sportsman
- Seán Ó Cuilleanáin (John Cullinane), Irish scribe and translator, fl. 1837–1845

Fictional people include:

- Dr. John Cullinane, archeologist and significant character in The Source by James Michener, 1965
- Karl Cullinane, main character in the Guardians of the Flame series by Joel Rosenberg
