= Pauline Auzou =

French artist (1775–1835)

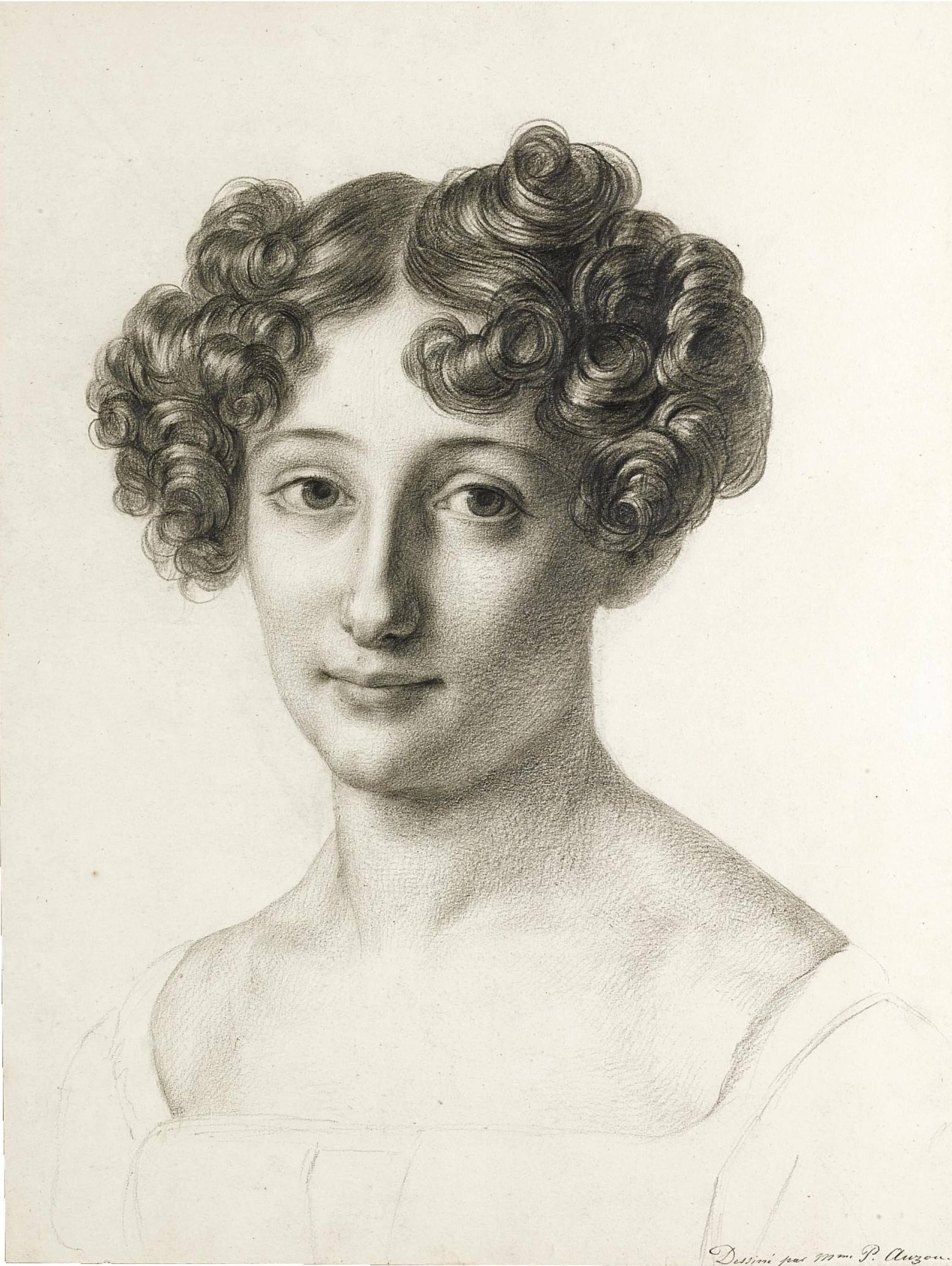
- Reputedly a self-portrait
- Born: Jeanne-Marie-Catherine Desmarquets; 24 March 1775; Paris, France
- Died: 15 May 1835 (aged 60); Paris, France
- Education: Jean-Baptiste Regnault's atelier
- Known for: Painter
- Movement: Neoclassicism, Troubadour art
- Spouse: Charles-Marie Auzou

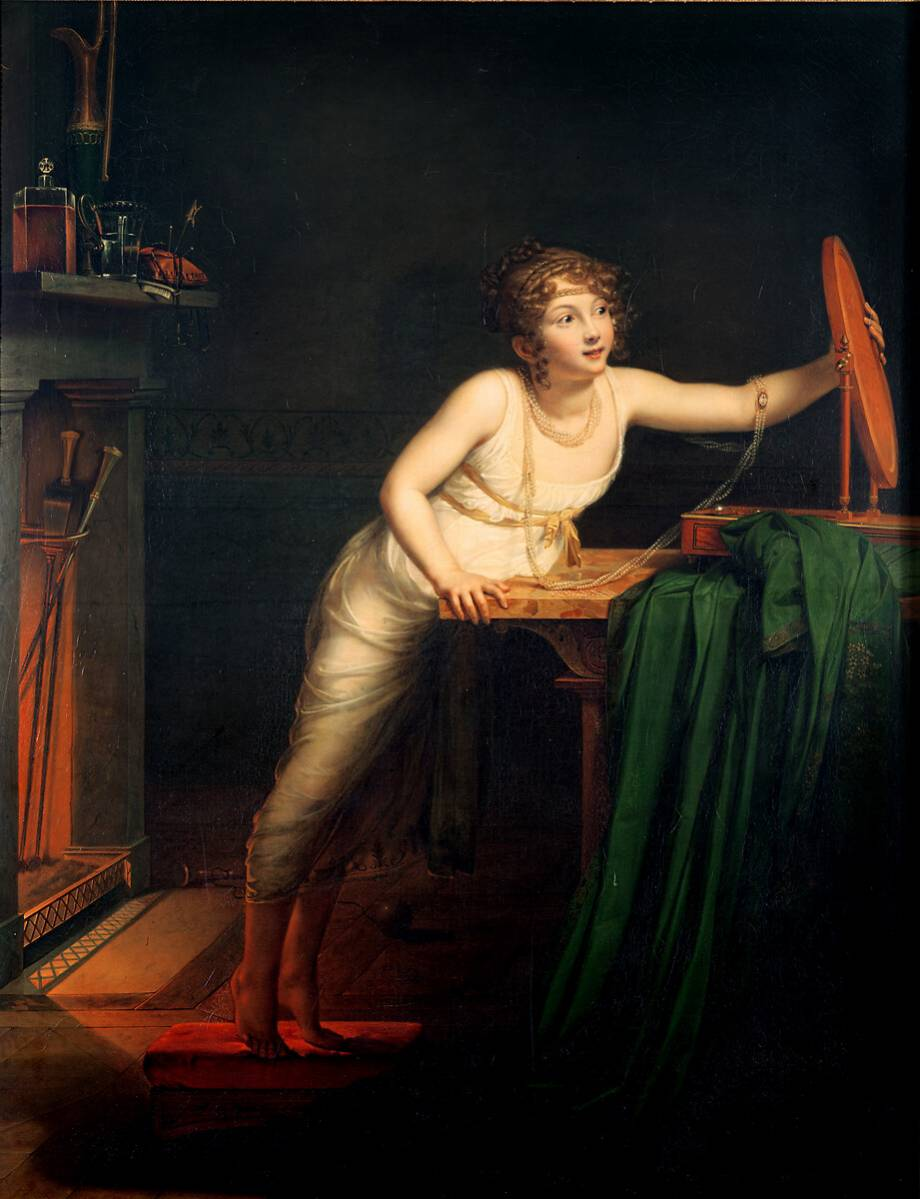
Pauline Auzou, The First Sense of Coquetry, 1804

Pauline Auzou (24 March 1775 – 15 May 1835) was a French painter, who exhibited at the Paris Salon between 1793 and 1817.

== Personal life ==
Jeanne-Marie-Catherine Desmarquets (sometime written Desmarquest) was born in Paris on 24 March 1775. She assumed the surname La Chapelle when she was adopted by a cousin. In December 1793, she married the stationer Charles-Marie Auzou. Starting in 1794, they had at least two sons, two daughters and a child who did not survive infancy.

Jacques-Augustin-Catherine Pajou bought one house of theirs in Fontenay-aux-Roses in 1820.

She died in Paris on 15 May 1835, aged 60.

== Career ==
In the late 18th century, women were generally prevented from attaining an education in art academies in France, particularly if they did not have money and connections. Auzou attended Jean-Baptiste Regnault's atelier in 1802, along with Sophie Guillemard, Eugénie Delaporte, Caroline Derigny and Henriette Lorimier. She was influenced by another woman artist, Marguerite Gérard, and by Jean-Auguste-Dominique Ingres.

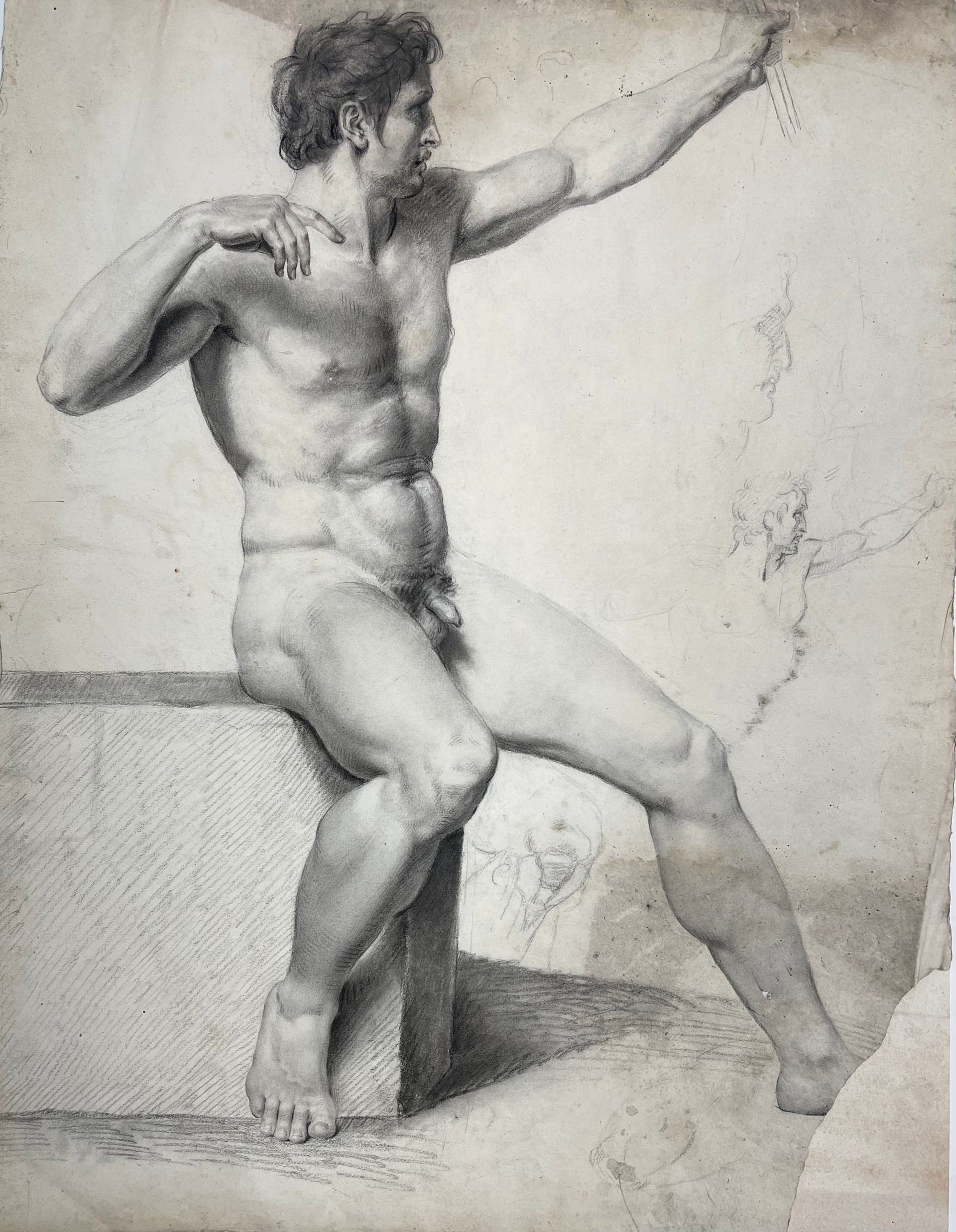
Drawing of a male nude model by Pauline Auzou

Early in her studies and career, Auzou made paintings of legendary Greek figures. She made studies of male and female nudes, something generally deemed inappropriate for women artists at the time. Women artists found greater success in creating paintings of women in homey settings, making music or reading.

She was a successful artist, first a Neoclassist, who made historic, genre and portrait paintings, including depictions of Napoleon. She received 2,000 to 4,000 francs in stipend payments, for the creation of essentially government mandated paintings of contemporary events, including paintings made of and for Napoleon. Like her sister artists Eugénie Servières, Hortense Haudebourt-Lescot, and Sophie Lemire, she added a feminine touch to paintings in the Troubadour style for patrons such as Caroline, Duchesse de Berry and Empress Josephine.

The Paris Salon opened up the exhibition to a greater number of women's works at the Salon of 1791. Her works were exhibited at the Paris Salon. In 1793, A Bacchante and A study of a head. She made a painting of legendary Daphnis and Phyllis, which was exhibited at the 1795 salon. In 1804, The First Sense of Coquetry was exhibited there. She was awarded a first-class medal at the Salon of 1806 for her painting of Pickard Elder, which in 1807 was represented in the painting Mr. Pickard and his family. In 1808, she was awarded the medaille de première classe for her work. That year she exhibited Mr. Picard and his family at the Salon of 1808.

At the Salon of 1810, she displayed a painting of Napoleon and his bride entitled Archduchess Marie-Louise in Compiègne, depicting the newly married Napoleon who looks on fondly, and secondarily, as Marie-Louise is met by her ladys-in-waiting. Other paintings made of the couple by Auzou included a painting of Marie-Louise with her family, Her Majesty the Empress, before Her Marriage, at the Moment of Taking Leave of Her Family. Shown in 1806, Departure for the Duel depicts the family drama as a man looks at his sleeping wife and child before departing for a duel. Like other women artists of this time, Auzou depicted events as they impacted families. In this case, the wife was "condemned to seduction and the child to poverty," according to art critic Pierre-Jean-Baptiste Chaussard. She exhibited at the Paris Salon until 1817 and generally until 1820.

Auzou opened an art school for young women, like other women artists, Lizinka de Mirbel and Marie Guilhelmine Benoist, and men. The studio and school were maintained for 20 years. Her book Têtes d'études (English: Head studies) was published in Paris by Didot.

Her painting Portrait of a musician is in the collection of the Currier Museum of Art, Manchester, New Hampshire, United States. Two of her works of Empress Marie-Louise are in the collections of The National Museum of Versailles, Palace of Versailles, including Her Majesty the Empress, before Her Marriage, at the Moment of Taking Leave of Her Family. Her works were collected by the Society of Friends to the Arts, Duchess de Berri and the French government. Several of these works were engraved, as well as period genre paintings such as the work engraved by John Norman, Diana of France and Montmorency.

== Legacy ==
Like Constance Mayer, Marguerite Gérard, Antoinette Haudebourt-Lescot and Marie-Denise Villers, Auzou was one of the successful women artists following the French Revolution:

Despite overt exclusion of women artists from the institutions governing their profession, women artists nevertheless made progress, as a group and as individuals, in the years following the French Revolution.

— Louise Nochlin, Women Artists: 1550-1950 catalog

== Works ==
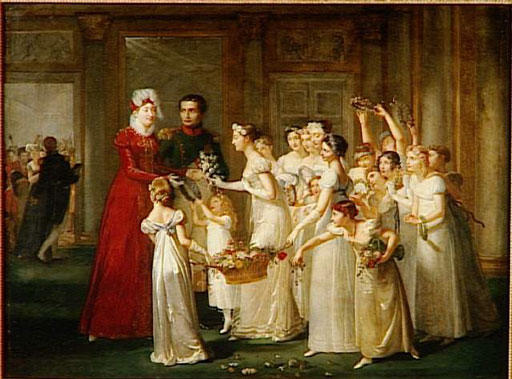
Arrival of Archduchess Marie-Louise in Compiègne (with new husband Napoleon)

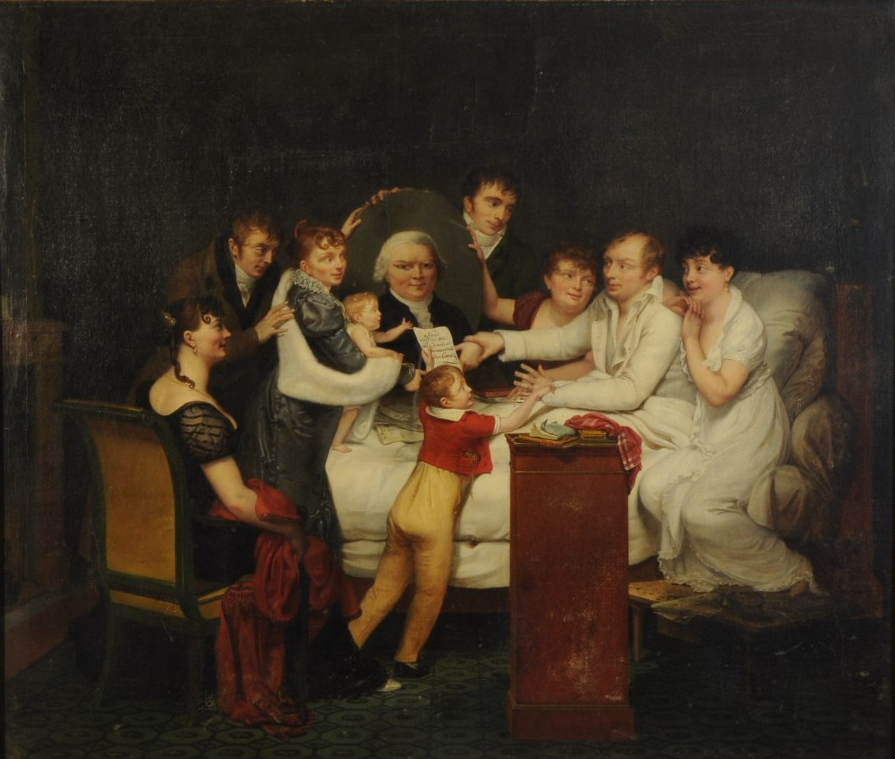
Pauline Auzou, Louis-Benoît Picard and his family, shown at the 1808 Paris Salon. Within the painting is a portrait of Picard Senior, for which she won a medal in the 1806 Paris Salon.

- A Bacchante, exhibited at 1793 Paris Salon
- A study of a head, exhibited at 1793 Paris Salon
- Agnes de Meranie, 1808
- Arrival of Archduchess Marie-Louise in Compiègne (with new husband Napoleon), 1810
- Daphnis and Phyllis, exhibited at the 1795 salon
- Departure for the Duel, exhibited in 1806
- Diana of France and Montgomery, 1814
- Her Majesty the Empress, before Her Marriage, at the Moment of Taking Leave of Her Family, Versailles Gallery, 1812
- Louis-Benoît Picard and his family, 1807
- Archduchess Marie-Louise in Compiègne, exhibited at the 1810 salon
- Picard the Elder, 1806, won a medal of honor in 1806 and first prize at the 1808 Paris Salon
- Portrait of a girl, bust length, est. 1790s, Snite Museum of Art, University of Notre Dame
- Portrait of a musician, oil on canvas, 1809
- Portraits of Volney, 1795
- Regnault, 1800
- The First Sense of Coquetry, exhibited at the 1804 salon
- The Return of Charles X
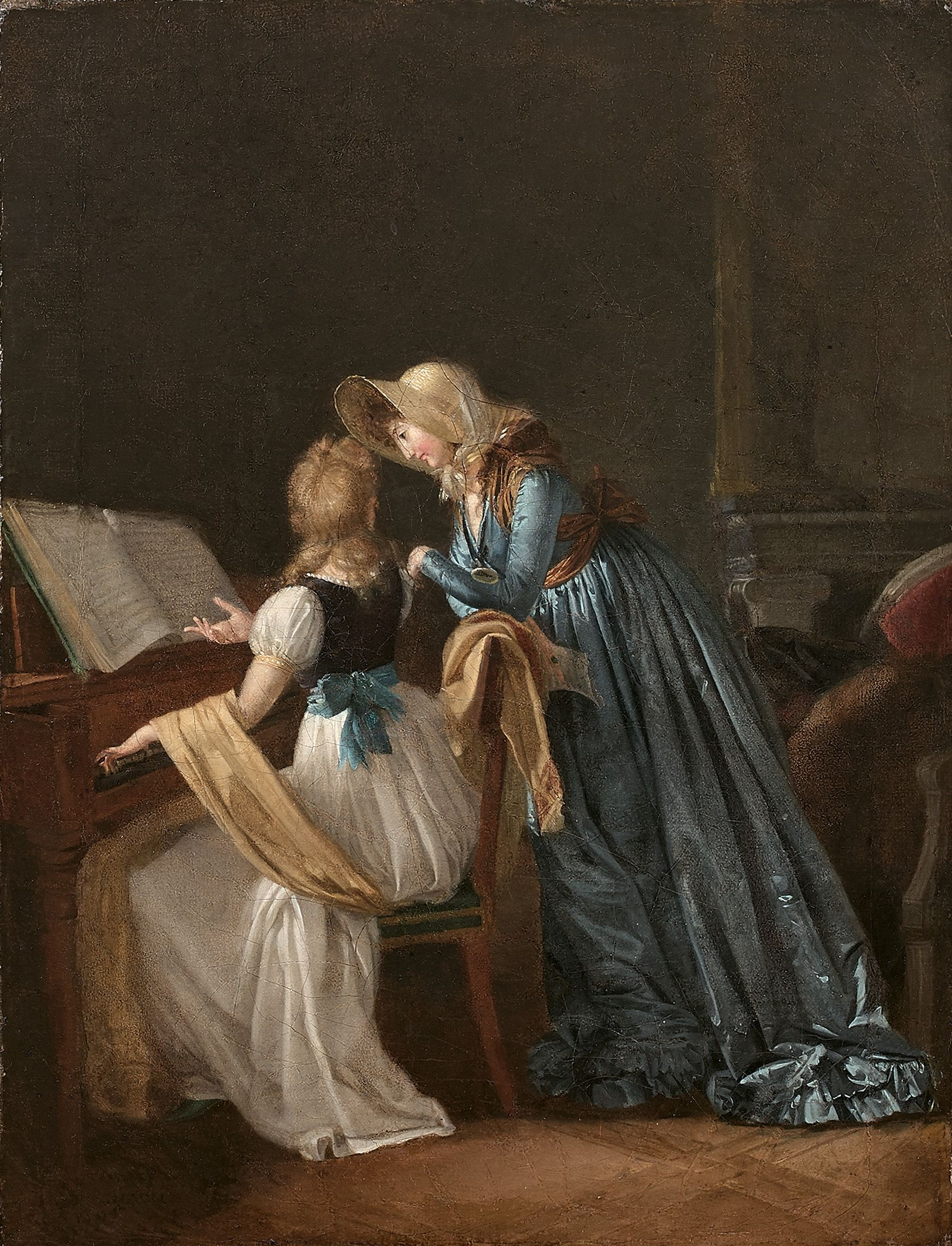
The Piano Lesson, 1796 (private collection)

Portrait of a Musician, 1809 (Currier Museum of Art)

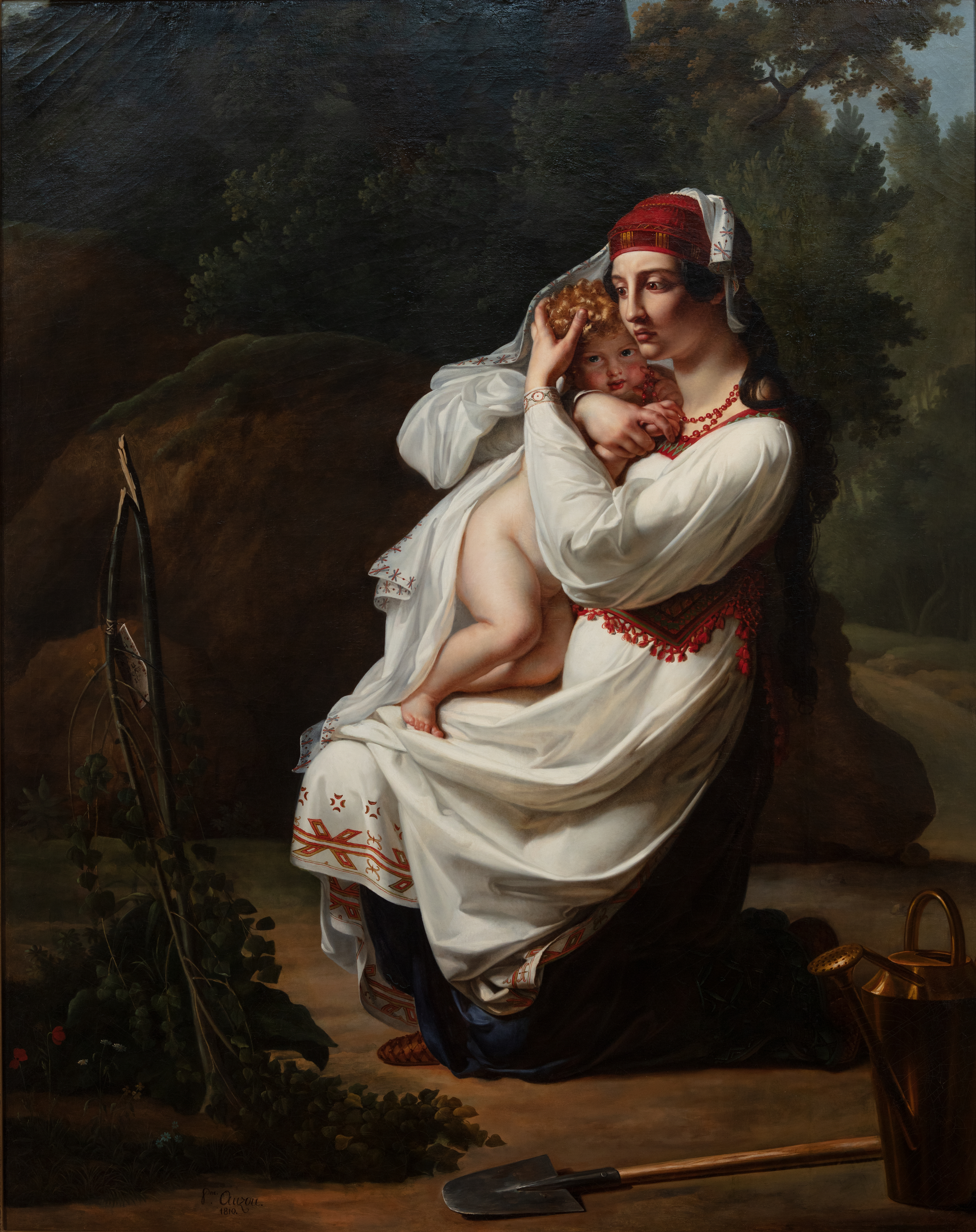
Daria, or Maternal Terror, 1810 (Horvitz Collection, promised gift to the Art Institute of Chicago

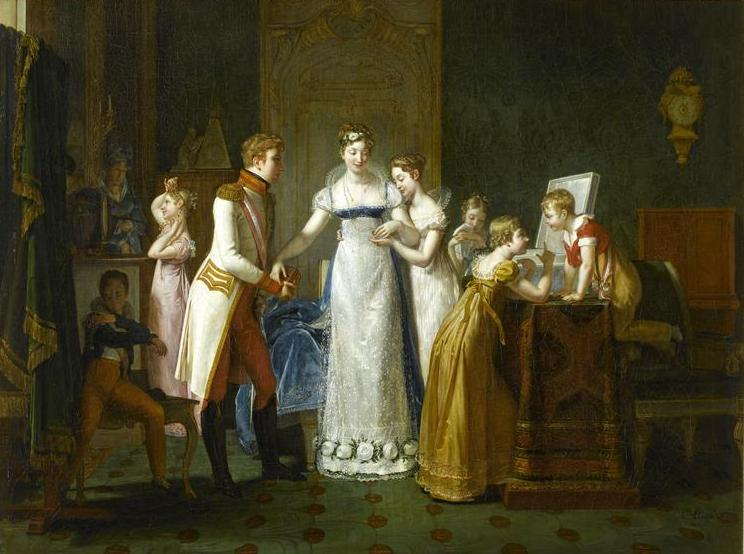
Marie-Louise of Austria Bidding Farewell to her Family in Vienna, 13 March 1810, 1812 (Palace of Versailles)

Novès and Alix de Provence, 1816 (Brou Museum of Bourg-en-Bresse)

The Eve of Saint Louis' Feast Day in the Village, 1817 (private collection)
