= Tax Commissioner of New York =

Tax Commissioner of New York can refer either to the Tax Commissioner of New York City, or the Tax Commissioner of New York State.

== Tax Commissioner of New York City ==
The Tax Commission of New York City reviews property tax assessments that are set by the New York City Department of Finance.

- Collin H. Woodward (?-1927) 1914 to ?.
- Daniel S. McElroy (1852-1914) ? to 1914.
- Lawson Purdy as president, and Frank Raymond circa 1908.
- Nathaniel Sands circa 1880.
- Michael Coleman (commissioner)
- Theodore Sutro

== Tax Commissioner of New York State ==
A division of the New York State Department of Taxation and Finance.

- Isaac Low (1735–1791).
- Thomas F. Byrnes, appointed 1911.
- Mark Graves circa 1927.
- John J. Merrill 1937
- Thomas H. Mattox.

== See also ==
- Walz v. Tax Commission
