= Jean Colin (disambiguation) =

Jean Colin may refer to:

- Jean Colin (1905–1989), English actress
- Jean Colin (general) (1864–1917), French soldier and military historian
- Jean Baptiste Leopold Colin (1881–1961), Flemish painter
- Vladimir Colin, pen name of Jean Colin (1921–1991), Romanian short story writer and novelist
