= Andrew Colin (financial analyst) =

Andrew Colin is a financial analyst specializing in portfolio theory, one of the first to apply chaos theory to financial market. He is currently adjunct professor at the Queensland University of Technology in Brisbane in the Faculty of Business. He gained a PhD in Mathematics from the University of St Andrews in 1987, is a Fellow of the Institute of Mathematics and its Applications, and holds Chartered Mathematician accreditation.

Colin has worked at or consulted for Citibank London, leading research into the use of artificial intelligence for foreign exchange and futures trading, Zurich Investment Management, the Commonwealth Bank, Suncorp Metway, Chubb Security, Arthur Andersen, EDS, Alcatel and the Royal Australian Navy. He is currently Director of Flametree Technologies, a company supplying innovative fixed income portfolio analysis software, as well as a respected industry voice.

== Academic writing ==
- "Fixed Income Attribution" (Wiley & Sons, London. January 2005) ISBN 978-0-470-01175-1
- Major contributors Carl Bacon, Andrew Colin. Edited by Timothy P. Ryan."Portfolio Analysis: Advanced Topics in Performance Measurement, Risk and Attribution" (Risk Books, London. 2006) ISBN 1-904339-82-4 (For more information see the book's page.)
- Taking the Random Route article by Dr Andrew Colin in Buy-Side Technology Journal November 2007.
