= Colin =

Colin may refer to:

- Colin (given name)
- Colin (surname)
- Colin (film), a 2008 Cannes film festival zombie movie
- Colin (horse) (1905–1932), Thoroughbred racehorse
- Colin (humpback whale), a humpback whale calf abandoned north of Sydney, Australia, in August 2008
- Colin (river), a river in France
- Colin (security robot), in Mostly Harmless of The Hitchhiker's Guide to the Galaxy series by Douglas Adams
- Tropical Storm Colin (disambiguation)
- Collin, a District Electoral Area in Belfast, Northern Ireland which is sometimes spelt "Colin"

== See also ==
- Colinus
- Collin (disambiguation)
- Kolin (disambiguation)
- Colyn
