= Colin Bell =

Colin Bell may refer to:

- Colin Bell (RAF officer) (born 1921)
- Colin Bell (journalist) (1938–2021), Scottish journalist, broadcaster and author
- Colin Bell (Australian politician) (born 1941), member of the Legislative Council of Western Australia
- Colin Bell (academic) (1942–2003), English academic
- Colin Bell (footballer, born 1946) (1946–2021), English international footballer
- Colin Bell (badminton) (born 1949), Northern Irish badminton player
- Colin Bell (footballer, born 1961), English football coach
- Colin Bell (footballer, born 1979), Mauritian footballer
- Colin Bell (American politician) (born 1981), member of the New Jersey Senate
