= François Andrieux =

French man of letters and playwright (1759–1833)

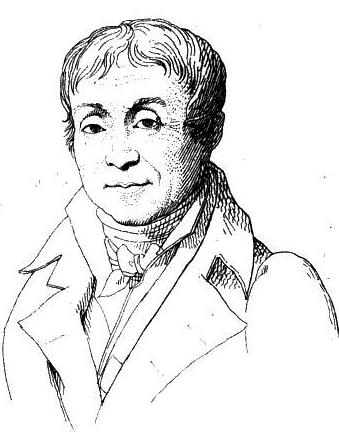
- François Andrieux
- Born: François Guillaume Jean Stanislaus Andrieux; 6 May 1759; Strasbourg
- Died: 9 May 1833 (aged 74); Paris
- Occupations: Politician; Playwright; Poet

François Guillaume Jean Stanislaus Andrieux (6 May 1759 – 9 May 1833) was a French man of letters and playwright.

== Life ==
Born and educated at Strasbourg, Andrieux proceeded to Paris to study law. There he became a close friend of Collin d'Harleville. He became secretary to the duke of Uzès, and practised at the bar, but his attention was divided between his profession and literature.

He died on 9 May 1833 in Paris.

His plays are of the 18th century style, comedies of intrigue, but they rank with those of Collin d'Harleville among the best of the period next to those of Pierre Beaumarchais. Les Étourdis is probably his best comedy.

== Works ==
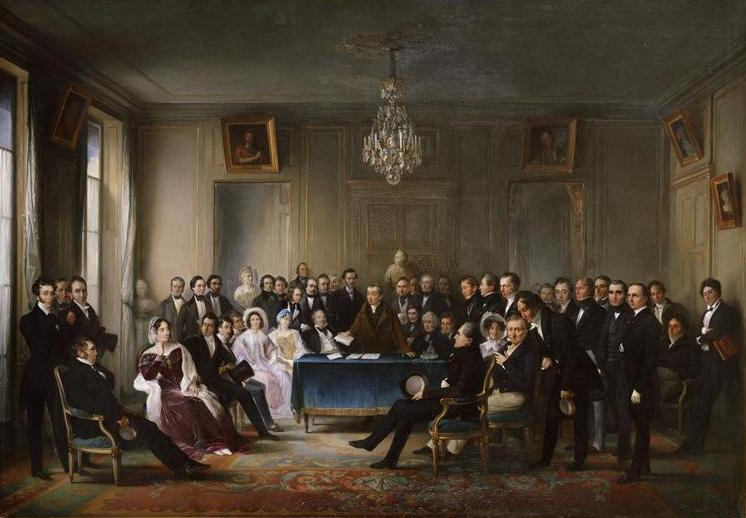
François-Joseph Heim, « François-Guillaume Andrieux faisant la lecture de sa tragédie Junius Brutus dans le foyer à la Comédie-Française le 26 mai 1828 », salon de 1847, Musée de l'Histoire de France.

=== Theatre ===
- 1782: Anaximandre, ou le Sacrifice aux Grâces, comedy in one act and verse of ten syllables, Comédie Italienne, 20 December
- 1787: Les Étourdis, ou le Mort supposé, comedy in three acts and in verse, Théâtre-Italien, 14 December
- 1790: Louis IX en Égypte, opera in three acts by Nicolas-François Guillard and Andrieux, music by Jean-Baptiste Lemoyne, Académie royale de musique, 15 June.
- 1794: L'Enfance de Jean-Jacques Rousseau, comedy in one act mingled with ariettes, music by Nicolas Dalayrac, created at Opéra-Comique (salle Favart), (4 prairial an II) 23 May.
- 1802: Helvétius, ou La Vengeance d’un sage, comedy in one act and in verse, Théâtre Louvois, 28 prairial an X.
- 1804: Le Trésor, comedy in five acts and in verse, Théâtre Louvois, 28 January.
- 1804: Molière avec ses amis, ou la Soirée d’Auteuil, comedy in one act and in verse, Théâtre-Français, 16 messidor an XII.
- 1808: La Suite du Menteur, comedy in five acts and in verse after Pierre Corneille, "With significant changes and additions and a prologue", Théâtre-Français, 29 October
- 1810: Le Vieux Fat, ou les Deux Vieillards, comedy in five acts and in verse, Théâtre-Français, 6 June
- 1830: Lucius Junius Brutus, tragedy in five acts, Théâtre-Français, 13 September.
- 1816: Quelques scènes impromptu ou la Matinée du jour de l’an. Prologue pour l’ouverture du Théâtre royal de l’Odéon, sous la direction of M. Picard, Théâtre de l’Odéon, 1 January.
- 1816: La Comédienne, comedy in three acts and in verse, Théâtre-Français, 6 March.
- 1818: La Jeune Créole, comedy in five acts and in prose, "imitated from English by Richard Cumberland"
- 1826: Le Rêve du mari, ou le Manteau, comedy in one act and in verse, Théâtre-Français, 20 May

=== Trivia ===
- 1795: Querelle de Saint-Roch et de Saint-Thomas, sur l’ouverture du manoir céleste à Mlle Chamero.
- 1800: Contes et opuscules, en vers et en prose, suivis de poésies fugitives. Par Andrieux, de l'Institut National. Paris, Renouard. [À Paris, Chez Ant. Aug. Renouard, Libraire, rue St.-André-des-Arcs, n°. 42. VIII - 1800.] In-8°, [1 (faux-titre)], [1 bl.], [1 (titre)], [1 bl.], IV (avertissement), [1 (errata)], [1 bl.], 184 p. [original edition containing his most famous plays: Le Procès du sénat de Capoue, Le Doyen de Badajoz, Le Meûnier de Sans-Souci et le Dialogue entre deux journalistes sur les mots « Monsieur » et « Citoyen ».]
- 1806: Cours de grammaire et de belles-lettres : Sommaire des leçon
- 1818–1823: Œuvres de François-Guillaume-Jean-Stanislas Andrieux (4 volumes)
- 1830–1831: Dialogues de l’orateur : Brutus ou Dialogue sur les orateurs illustres (2 volumes). Translation from Cicero.
- 1842: Poésies de François-Guillaume-Jean-Stanislas Andrieux.
- 1900: Récits et anecdotes
