= Kollin =

Kollin is a given name and surname. It may refer to:

- Kollin Johannsen, musician, member of American band The Colourist
- Erik August Kollin (1836–1901), Finnish goldsmith, silversmith and Fabergé workmaster
- Toralv Kollin Markussen (1895–1973), Norwegian politician, member of the Communist Party

== See also ==
- Colin (disambiguation)
- Collin (disambiguation)
