= Black Death Award =

Award for exceptional football performance at US Military Academy

The Black Death Award is an individual honor awarded to college football players at the United States Military Academy (better known as 'West Point') who distinguish themselves during a game. It is presented to players only in the case of "exceptional, near perfect play."

The award was first instituted by Army coach Jim Young in 1988. In 2007, Stan Brock, as the new head coach, reinstated the award. The award itself consists of a plaque featuring an Army Ranger-style knife and engraved with the honoree's name. According to Brock, it is given to players who go "above and beyond" and play "a near perfect game and have something to do with the outcome of the game for a victory."

== Recent honorees ==
Year	Player	Position	Achievement
2007	LTC Greg Gadson	LB	
2007	Mike Wright	WR	vs. Tulane (20–17)
2008	Frank Scappaticci	LB	vs. Louisiana Tech (14–7)
2008	Collin Mooney	RB	vs. Tulane (44–17)
