= Von der Heydt =

Von der Heydt is a surname. Notable people with the surname include:

- August von der Heydt (1801–1874), German economist
- Eduard von der Heydt (1884-1964), German-born Swiss banker
- James Arnold von der Heydt (born 1919), American lawyer and judge

== See also ==
- Von der Heydt Museum, museum in Wuppertal, Germany
- Heydt
