= Paul Colin =

Paul Colin may refer to:

- Paul Colin (artist) (1892–1985), French poster artist
- Paul Colin (journalist) (1895–1943), Belgian fascist journalist and editor
- Paul Colin (writer) (1920–2018), French novelist

== See also ==
- Paul Collin (1843–1915), French poet and writer
