= Portfolio Analysis =

Financial industry text

Portfolio Analysis: Advanced topics in performance measurement, risk and attribution
- Editor: Timothy P. Ryan
- Publisher: Risk Books
- Publication date: 2006
- ISBN: 1-904339-82-4

Portfolio Analysis: Advanced topics in performance measurement, risk and attribution (Risk Books, 2006. ISBN 1-904339-82-4) is an industry text written by a comprehensive selection of industry experts and edited by Timothy P. Ryan. It includes chapters from practitioners and industry authors who investigate topics under the wide umbrella of performance measurement, attribution and risk management, drawing on their own experience of the fields.

The book also boasts a first in its area in that it brings together previously separated topics and practitioners or ex-post performance measurement and ex-ante performance risk measurement. It is also the first book to explain the role of the Transition Manager.

The book includes coverage and discussion of performance measurement, performance evaluation, portfolio risk, performance attribution, Value-at-Risk (VaR), managing tracking error and GIPS verification.

It is also said to cover the following developing areas of the marketplace:

- Alternative assets
- Hedge funds
- Commodity futures
- Life-cycle funds
- Book income-orientated investments
- Transition management

== Full alphabetical list of contributors ==
To see a list of the chapters contributed by the following co-authors and an Editor Biography, see the Risk Books product page.

- Carl Bacon
- Curt Burmeister
- James G. Cashman
- Dr Andrew Colin
- Dan diBartolomeo
- Bruce J. Feibel
- Barry Feldman
- Andrew Scott Bay Frongello
- Philip H. Galdi
- Mark A. Keleher
- Robert Kuberek
- Peter Matheos
- Helmut Mausser
- Krishna Prasad
- Ronald J. Surz
- Hilary Till
- Karyn D. Vincent
- Susan E. Woodward
- Laurence Wormald
