= Hialmar Collin =

Danish diplomat

Hialmar Collin (1891–1987) was a Danish diplomat who served as the minister plenipotentiary of Denmark to the Republic of China. Although he was initially accredited to the Nationalist government under Chiang Kai-shek based out of Chongqing, in August 1941 German-occupied Denmark was forced to recognize the Nanjing-based Reorganized National Government of China, a puppet state of the Empire of Japan. Thus Collin served as Denmark's representative in Nanjing to the Wang Jingwei regime until the end of World War II in 1945.

Diplomatic posts
Preceded by Oscar O'Neill Oxholm	Danish Minister Plenipotentiary to China (Nanjing regime from 1941); 1940–1945	Succeeded by Alex Mørch
