= Colin Bell (RAF officer) =

Royal Air Force officer

Colin Bell DFC
- Born: 5 March 1921 (age 105)
- Military career
- Allegiance: United Kingdom
- Branch: Royal Air Force
- Service years: 1940–1946
- Rank: Flight Lieutenant
- Unit: No. 608 Squadron RAuxAF
- Known for: Last surviving Mosquito pilot

Flight Lieutenant Colin Bell, DFC, is a British pilot notable for being the last surviving Second World War de Havilland Mosquito pilot. Bell joined the Royal Air Force in 1940, and had a three-year spell as a flying instructor before joining No. 608 (Pathfinder) Squadron, with whom he flew fifty sorties over Germany. In 2026 Bell released his memoir, Bloody Dangerous.

== Early life ==
Bell was born on 5 March 1921. He was inspired to join the RAF after seeing a nearby house struck by a bomb during the London Blitz.

== RAF service ==
Bell joined the RAF in 1940, and was sent to the United States for civilian flying training under the Arnold Scheme. Following America's entry into the war, Bell was retained as an instructor, responsible for training British and American cadets in the piloting of single-engined aircraft.

Bell returned to Britain in 1943, and joined No. 608 (Pathfinder) Squadron at RAF Downham Market in Norfolk, piloting the de Havilland Mosquito. He flew fifty sorties, all of which were over Germany, thirteen of them against Berlin.

Bell's navigator throughout the tour was Doug Redmond, a Canadian who had begun his working life as a lumberjack before becoming a navigation instructor; Bell, who had instructed American cadets in the United States, described the pair as "a good team". Redmond "didn't get frightened except on one occasion", when a shell exploded beneath the aircraft and lifted it, temporarily cutting power on both engines; fragments of the shell were later found lodged in the parachute pack that formed Bell's seat. When Bell asked him afterwards whether he had been frightened, Redmond replied that he had been "bloody terrified".

Bell's first operation was flown against Emden in September 1944. Caught by naval anti-aircraft fire on the approach to the target, he escaped in a steep dive from 25,000 feet, during which the Mosquito built up a speed "far in excess of what the Mosquito was designed to do" and the control column would not respond; Bell recovered the aircraft using the tail trim, and later recalled that failure to do so "would have been the end of Colin Bell and Doug Redmond". He attributed his survival in part to temperament, recalling that the Battle of Britain pilot Adolph "Sailor" Malan considered survivors to be "those possessed of not too much imagination. Fear kills."

Over Berlin, Bell recalled being coned by searchlights on the way in to the target, over it, and on the way out, while shells were fired at the aircraft. He described his most dangerous experience as being pursued by a German jet fighter, 100 miles per hour faster than the Mosquito: warned by the white light of a rear-mounted radar receiver, he dropped 10,000 feet and drew the jet down to low altitude, exploiting its limited endurance before escaping in darkness. Redmond never accepted that the aircraft had been a jet, but the test pilot Eric "Winkle" Brown told Bell years later that he was "bloody lucky to be alive" and had done "absolutely the right thing", and a journalist later told Bell that Ministry of Defence records showed that Mosquitos had been shot down over Berlin by jet fighters.

After his wing commander warned that German propaganda was encouraging civilians to lynch downed aircrew, Bell carried a Smith & Wesson .38 revolver with twenty rounds of ammunition on operations, describing it as his mascot.

== Postwar ==
Following the end of the Second World War, Bell retired from RAF service in 1946. He worked as a Chartered Surveyor until retirement in 2019, at the age of 98. Bell described having worked as a chartered surveyor for the government until the age of sixty, when he took his pension and set up his own practice, and said that he had worked until nearly five years before a 2026 interview, by which time the interviewers noted he had reached a hundred.

In 2019, Bell was formally presented with his wings by Air Marshal Stuart Atha; due to his time as an instructor during the Second World War, he had not received them upon completing his flying training.

In 2023, Bell took part in a fundraising drive for the London Air Ambulance, the Royal College of Nursing Foundation, and the RAF Benevolent Fund. As part of this drive, he abseiled 17 storeys down the side of the Royal London Hospital. At 102 years old, he set the world record for 'oldest-ever participant in an abseil'.

On 5 March 2026, Bell's memoir, Bloody Dangerous, was published by Hachette UK. During the press tour, Bell was welcomed to Buckingham Palace by King Charles III, and presented with the citation to his Distinguished Flying Cross. The book closes with Bell's personal motto, which he renders as nil illegitimi bastardia carborundum – "don't let the bastards grind you down".

== Personal life ==
Bell met his wife Cath when she joined the firm of chartered surveyors where he was working, he at nineteen and she at seventeen; they were married for seventy-four years until her death, which occurred in the couple's flat in Royal Tunbridge Wells. Bell said of her that "if anybody deserved a decoration, it was her, not me", and named tolerance as the secret of a happy marriage and kindness as the greatest lesson he learned from her. He described the first year after Cath's death as "very hard indeed", and credited the Royal Air Force Club, which he regarded as his second home, with helping him through his widowhood.

Asked at the age of 104 for the secret of a long life, he gave it as "exercise, alcohol ... and the love of good women".
