= Gustave Colin =

French lawyer, judge and politician

- Born: April 2, 1814; Pontarlier, Doubs, Franche-Comté, France
- Died: November 12, 1880 (aged 66); Pontarlier, Doubs, Franche-Comté, France
- Occupations: Lawyer, judge, politician

Gustave Colin (1814–1880) was a French lawyer, judge and politician.

== Early life ==
Gustave Colin was born on April 2, 1814, in Pontarlier, France.

== Career ==
Colin started his career as a lawyer. He later served as a judge in Morteau and Pontarlier. He wrote a thesis about the cheese industry in Franche-Comté and another study about chemical fertilizers.

Colin served as a member of the National Assembly from 1876 to 1880.

== Death ==
Colin died on November 12, 1880, in Pontarlier.
