= Collin, Texas =

- Unincorporated community
- Location within Texas Location within the United States
- Coordinates: 33°11′55″N 96°48′59″W
- Country: United States
- State: Texas
- County: Collin
- Elevation: 630 ft (190 m)
- Time zone: UTC-6 (Central (CST))
  - Summer (DST): UTC-5 (CDT)
- GNIS feature ID: 1378143

Collin is an unincorporated community in Collin County, located in the U.S. state of Texas.
