= Colin Wilson (disambiguation) =

Colin Wilson (1931–2013) was a British writer.

Colin Wilson may also refer to:

- Cole Wilson (Colin James Wilson, 1922–1993), New Zealand musician, singer, songwriter and railway worker
- Colin St John Wilson (1922–2007), British architect, lecturer and author
- Colin Wilson (volcanologist) (born 1956), volcanologist at the Victoria University of Wellington New Zealand
- Colin Wilson (Australian footballer) (1933–2018), Australian rules footballer
- Colin Wilson (comics) (born 1949), New Zealand comic book artist
- Colin Wilson (boxer) (1972–2026), Australian boxer
- Colin Wilson (ice hockey) (born 1989), American retired ice hockey player
- Colin Wilson (Scottish footballer) (born 1993), Scottish footballer
- Colin Wilson (film producer) (born 1961), American film producer
- Colin Wilson (rugby) (born 1969), Scottish rugby league international and rugby union player
