= Colin Campbell (cricketer, born 1977) =

English cricketer

Colin Campbell (born 11 August 1977) was an English cricketer. He was a right-handed batsman and a right-arm medium-fast bowler who played for Durham.

Campbell played twice for Durham, making his debut in 1996. He has appeared in five Youth Tests, for England Under-19s, making his debut in January 1996 against Zimbabwe Under-19s, before the game was cut short because of the on-set of Cyclone Bonita. He appeared in four further Youth Tests, as well as two Youth One-Day Internationals, against New Zealand.

At domestic level, he debuted for Durham's Second XI in 1995, playing in the Second XI Championship until 1997, and appearing twice in both first-class and limited overs cricket. Campbell was not able to impress sufficiently in the Second XI enough to secure a regular place in the first team.

Campbell was a tailend batsman and a frequent bowler.
