= Seán Ó Cuilleanáin =

Irish scribe and translator

Seán Ó Cuilleanáin (John Cullinane, fl. 1837-1845) was an Irish scribe and translator.

A native of Cummer, County Galway, Ó Cuilleanáin transcribed Fenian Cycle lore and songs in English.
