= Tom Collin =

English cricketer

Thomas Collin (7 April 1911 – 26 August 2003) was an English cricketer who played first-class cricket for Warwickshire between 1933 and 1936. He was born in South Moor, County Durham and died in the city of Durham.

Collin was a left-handed middle-order batsman and a slow left-arm orthodox spin bowler, though in a county team that included the England Test bowler George Paine, also a slow left-arm spinner, and the leg-breaks and googlies of Eric Hollies, he was never more than an occasional bowler. He appeared first in eight matches in the 1933 season, and "showed real promise", according to Wisden Cricketers' Almanack's review of the season, though he did not reach 50 in any innings. He was again an irregular player in 1934, but at the start of the 1935 season he played a match-saving innings of 105 not out and shared a seventh wicket partnership of 199 with Tom Dollery, who also made his maiden century, in the game against Gloucestershire; the partnership remains in 2015 Warwickshire's highest for that wicket against Gloucestershire. He did not manage to build on this start to the season, however, although his fielding was exceptional: the South African Cyril Vincent dropped his bat and stood to applaud the catch Collin took to dismiss him at square leg in the touring team's game at Edgbaston. He was not successful in the 1936 season and at the end of the year he left the Warwickshire staff.

Collin returned to North East England in 1937 and for the next 39 years he was the cricket coach at Durham School. He played a few Minor Counties matches for Durham between 1938 and 1946.
