= John Collin =

John Collin may refer to:

- John Collin (actor) (1931–1987), British actor
- John F. Collin (1802–1889), American politician
