= Colin Campbell (footballer, born 1918) =

Australian rules footballer

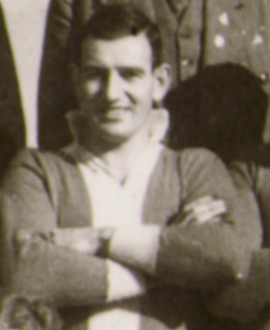

Personal information
- Full name: Colin Campbell
- Born: 2 January 1918; Thornbury, Victoria
- Died: 18 October 2003 (aged 85)
- Original team: Preston
- Height: 185 cm (6 ft 1 in)
- Weight: 85 kg (187 lb)

Playing career^{1}
Years	Club	Games (Goals)
1940–1941	Collingwood	17 (4)
- ^{1} Playing statistics correct to the end of 1941.

Colin Campbell (2 January 1918 – 18 October 2003) was an Australian rules footballer who played with Collingwood in the Victorian Football League (VFL).
