= Jean Baptiste Leopold Colin =

Flemish painter (1881–1961)

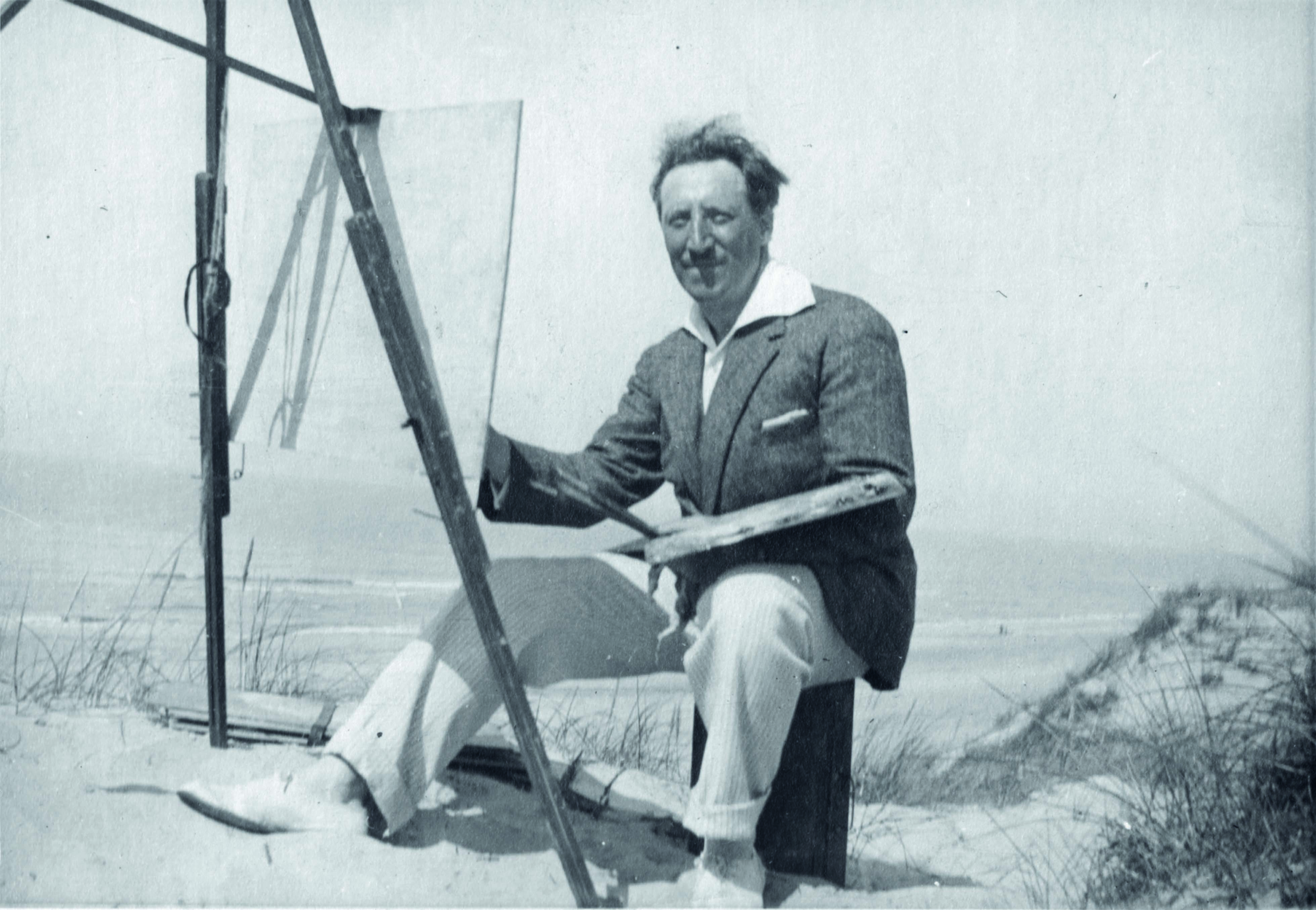
Jean Colin c. 1915

Jean Colin (1881–1961) was a Flemish painter most known for his portraits, nudes, and still life paintings. He was a pupil of Isidore Verheyden, one of the great Belgian masters of the 19th century. Colin was also considered a contemporary of Philippe Swyncop, who shared Colin's talent for producing intense life in his portrait subjects. He lived and had his workshop in Saint-Josse-ten-Noode, one of the municipalities In the Greater Brussels area, until the time of his death, In 1961.

His travels in Africa led him to develop a taste for the exotic, which came through in his many paintings of gypsies ("bohemians") and even Africans in the Belgian Congo. Colin painted many portraits of his family members and was also commissioned to paint the portrait of His Majesty King Albert I of Belgium. The children of the Bonnier family were often used as models In his works between the late 1920s and late 1930s. His painting 'Travesti' features Bertha and her older brother, Maurice, Bonnier, as well as the artist's wife.

== Famous works ==
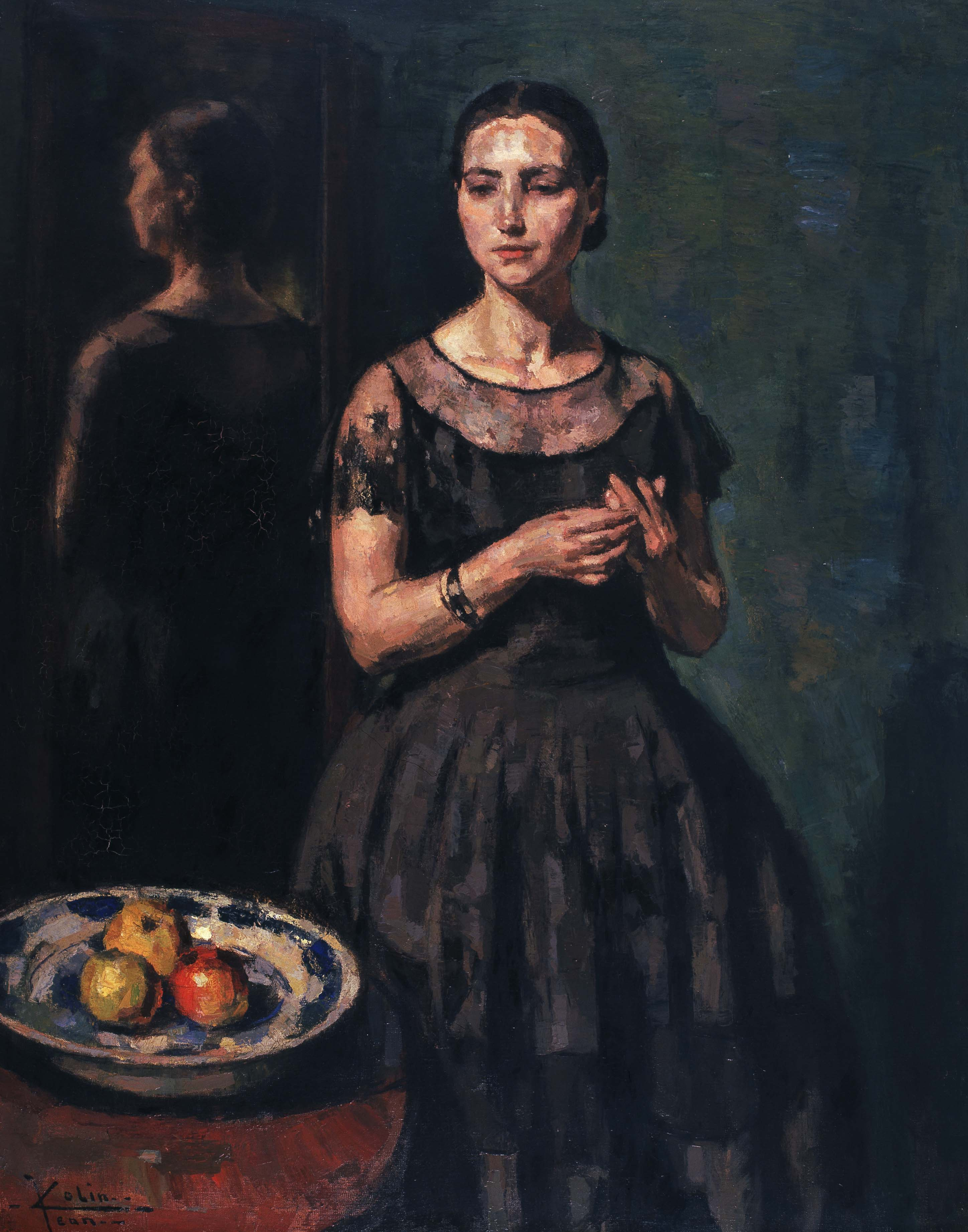
La Dame en Noir

- Nativity, for which he was awarded the Grand Prix de Rome;
- Travesti
- Nu, which was exhibited in 1912 at the Salon de Printemps, Brussels, Belgium;
- La Dame en Noir
- Melodie

== Sources ==
- Personal papers and oral history with Achiel Rawoens, nephew of Jean Colin, 2007
- Allgemeines Künstler-Lexicon: Die Bildenden Künstler aller Zeiten Und Völker (München-Leipzig 1998)
- Oral history and original works passed on by Bertha Bonnier, mother of Eveline Schultz (née Cardoens) and one of the models used in some of his works.
