= Cooling (disambiguation) =

Cooling is removal of heat, usually resulting in a lower temperature and/or phase change, or other temperature lowering.

- Cooling (surname), including a list of people wityh the name
- "Cooling", a song by Tori Amos from the 1999 album To Venus and Back
- Cooling, Kent, a village in England
- Cooling and heating (combinatorial game theory)

== See also ==
- Coolin', a 1957 album by the Prestige All Stars
- Guling, Jiangxi, formerly romanized as Kuling, a place in China
