= Joanna Cullinane =

New Zealand professor of organisational studies

Academic background
- Education: University of Waikato, University of Glamorgan
- Thesis: The political economy of employment relationships in New Zealand (2003)
- Doctoral advisor: Clive H. J. Gilson, Mark Harcourt

Joanna Cullinane is a New Zealand academic, and is a full professor at Massey University, specialising in management and employment relations. Between 2017 and 2025 she was Deputy Pro-Vice Chancellor of the Massey Business School.

== Academic career ==
Cullinane completed a PhD titled The political economy of employment relationships in New Zealand at the University of Waikato in 2003. Cullinane moved to the UK, and completed a Masters in Human Resource Management at the University of Glamorgan (now the University of South Wales). She also was lecturer in organisational behaviour and Deputy Head of Division at the University of Glamorgan. She was Dean Academic at Coventry University London, and Director of Learning and Teaching at the University of Greenwich. Cullinane returned to New Zealand and joined the faculty of Massey University in 2017, rising to full professor in 2024. As of 2024 she is Deputy Pro Vice-Chancellor of the Massey Business School and chairs the Academic Progress committee. Cullinane played "an instrumental role" in the formation of a partnership between Massey University and Nanjing University of Finance and Economics (NUFE). During the period of the COVID-19 pandemic when New Zealand's borders were closed to foreign students, Massey opened a learning centre at NUFE for their Chinese students to continue their qualifications, and this led to the establishment of a joint educational institute based at NUFE in 2022.

Cullinane's research focuses on organisational behaviour and management and employee relations. She has written on employment in the construction industry, differences in mask-wearing behaviours in different countries during the pandemic, and has researched the level of employee support for vaccine mandates in New Zealand workplaces.

== Selected works ==
=== Books and book chapters ===
- Raiden, A., Pye, M., & Cullinane, J. (2007). The nature of the employment relationship in the UK construction industry: A flexible construct?. In A. Dainty, & B. Bagilhole (Eds.) People and Culture in Construction.Taylor & Francis
- Cullinane, J. (Ed.) (2005). Working in Organisations. Pearson Publication. 2 editions. ISBN 1846582806
- Croucher, SM., Cullinane, J., Murray, N., Rocker, KT., & Nguyen, T. (2023). Health communication and behaviors during the COVID-19 pandemic: A 22-nation exploration of mask-wearing. In Pandemic Communication. (pp. 12 – 41).

=== Journal articles ===
- Arthur Morgan; Kath Cannan; Joanne Cullinane (2005). "360° feedback: a critical enquiry". Personnel Review. 34 (6): 663–680. doi:10.1108/00483480510623457. Wikidata Q125357104.
- Arthur Morgan; Joanne Cullinane; Michael Pye (2008). "Continuing Professional Development: rhetoric and practice in the NHS1". Journal of Education and Work. 21 (3): 233–248. doi:10.1080/13639080802214100. Wikidata Q111224577.
- Mahmood Ali; Joanna Cullinane (2014). "A Study to Evaluate the Effectiveness of Simulation based Decision Support System in ERP Implementation in SMEs". Procedia Technology. 16: 542–552. doi:10.1016/j.protcy.2014.10.002. Wikidata Q125357106.
- Stephen Michael Croucher; Stephanie Kelly; Chen Hui; et al. (2021). "Articulated dissent and immediacy: a cross-national analysis of the effects of COVID-19 lockdowns". International Journal of Conflict Management. 33 (2): 181–202. doi:10.1108/ijcma-04-2021-0062. Wikidata Q125357102.
- Douglas Ashwell; Joanna Cullinane; Stephen M Croucher (2021). "Vaccine Hesitancy and Support for Employer Vaccine Mandates". Frontiers in Communication. 6. doi:10.3389/fcomm.2021.780415. Wikidata Q125357105.
- Joanna Cullinane (2001). "Workplace determinants of union presence in New Zealand organisations". International Journal of Manpower. 22 (4): 380–392. doi:10.1108/eum0000000005574. Wikidata Q125357107.
