= Collin Ryan Fitzgerald =

- Allegiance: Canada
- Branch: Canadian Army
- Rank: Master Corporal
- Commands: Princess Patricia's Canadian Light Infantry.
- Conflicts: War in Afghanistan

Master Corporal Collin Ryan Fitzgerald, MMV is a Canadian soldier who was among the first recipients of the Medal of Military Valour, a Canadian military decoration, in recognition of actions under enemy fire in Afghanistan. He belonged to Princess Patricia's Canadian Light Infantry.

The citation reads:

Master Corporal Collin Ryan Fitzgerald, M.M.V.

Shilo, Manitoba, and Morrisburg, Ontario
Medal of Military Valour

Master Corporal Fitzgerald deployed with 5 Platoon, B Company, 1 PPCLI Battle Group in Afghanistan. He is recognized for outstanding selfless and valiant actions carried out on May 24, 2006, during an ongoing enemy ambush involving intense, highly accurate enemy fire. Master Corporal Fitzgerald repeatedly exposed himself to enemy fire by entering and re-entering a burning platoon vehicle and successfully driving it off the roadway, permitting the remaining vehicles trapped in the enemy zone to break free. Master Corporal Fitzgerald's courageous and completely selfless and heroic actions were instrumental to his platoon's successful egress and undoubtedly contributed to saving the lives of his fellow platoon members.
