= Collin Ashton =

American football player (born 1983)

Profile
- Position: Linebacker

Personal information
- Born: July 24, 1983 (age 43); Mission Viejo, California, U.S.
- Listed height: 6 ft 1 in (1.85 m)
- Listed weight: 220 lb (100 kg)

Career information
- High school: Mission Viejo; Mission Viejo, California, U.S.
- College: USC
- NFL draft: 2006: undrafted

Career history
- San Diego Chargers (2006)*
- * Offseason or practice squad member only

Collin Ashton (born July 24, 1983) is an American former professional football player who was a linebacker in the National Football League (NFL). He played college football at USC. Ashton was signed by the San Diego Chargers as an undrafted free agent in 2006.

== High school football ==
Ashton played high school football at Mission Viejo High School.

== College football ==
Ashton played college football at the University of Southern California (USC) where he graduated in 2006. He was a walk-on player who earned a scholarship. Six previous generations of Ashton's family attended USC, and he had been to every USC Trojans game since birth.

== Professional career ==
After going unselected in the 2006 NFL draft, he was signed by the National Football League's San Diego Chargers in May 2006 and was released the next month. Ashton then unsuccessfully tried out for the Baltimore Ravens. In 2007, he played as middle linebacker for the Flash de la Courneuve in Paris (France) where he won the national title.
