= Collin H. Woodward =

Tax Commissioner of New York (died 1927)

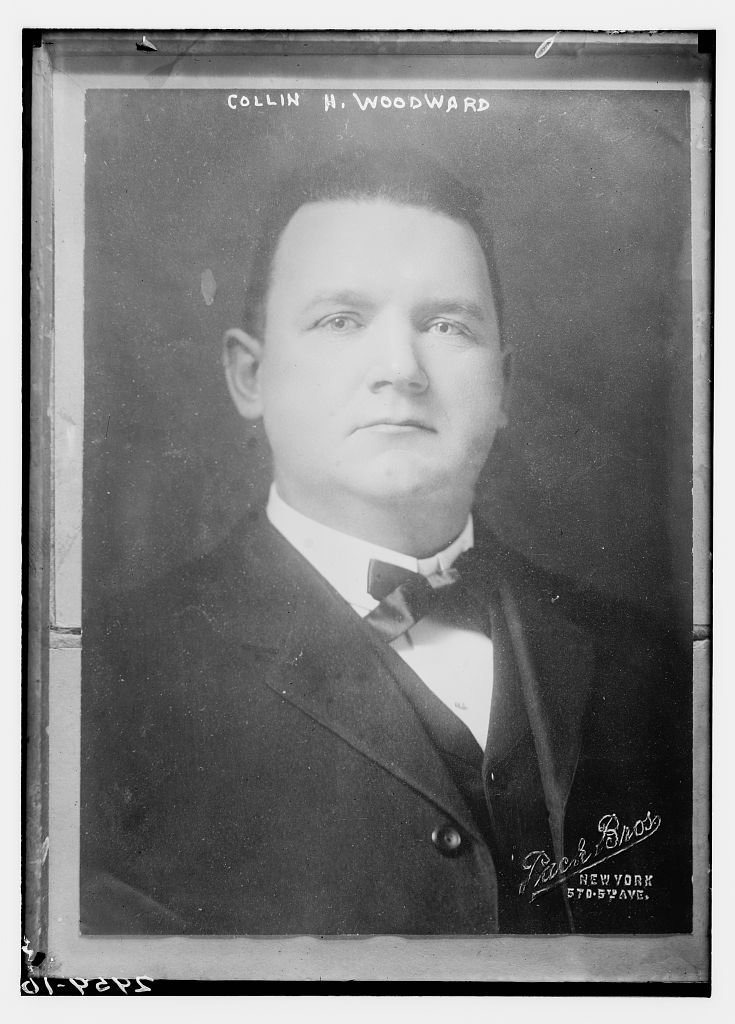

Collin H. Woodward (? – September 7, 1927) was the Tax Commissioner of New York City and Republican district leader. He succeeded Daniel S. McElroy as Tax Commissioner of New York City.

== Biography ==
He died on September 7, 1927, in an automobile accident near Poughkeepsie, New York.
