= Collin Dyer =

Member of the National Assembly of Seychelles

Member of the National Assembly of Seychelles

Personal details
- Occupation: Politician, business man

Collin Dyer is a member of the National Assembly of Seychelles. A businessman by profession, he is a member of the Seychelles National Party, and was first elected to the Assembly in 2002.
