= Collin van Eijk =

Dutch footballer (born 1991)

Personal information
- Date of birth: 29 August 1991 (age 35)
- Place of birth: Heerlen, Netherlands
- Height: 1.91 m (6 ft 3 in)
- Position: Goalkeeper

Team information
- Current team: RKSV De Ster Stein

Youth career
- NEC '92
- Roda JC

Senior career*
Years	Team	Apps	(Gls)
2010–2011	Roda JC	2	(0)
2011–2013	MVV	6	(0)
2013	EHC		
2014–2017	Spouwen-Mopertingen		
2017–2020	EHC		
2020–2021	Eendracht Termien		
2021–2023	EHC	5	(0)
2023–2024	Heksenberg-NEC Heerlen		
2024–	RKSV De Ster Stein		
- * Club domestic league appearances and goals as of 3 February 2026

Collin van Eijk (born 29 August 1991) is a Dutch professional footballer who plays as a goalkeeper for RKSV De Ster Stein.

== Club career ==
Van Eijk played in the Roda JC youth academy and made his professional debut as a late sub for Mads Junker in the 2010-11 Eredivisie season against FC Twente. He then joined MVV Maastricht in summer 2011. He later moved abroad to play in Belgium for Spouwen-Mopertingen after spending half a season at Dutch amateur outfit EHC/Heuts. He was replaced as Spouwen's first keeper by Tom Grootaers in February 2017 and subsequently left the club.
