= Collin Circelli =

Canadian ice hockey player (born 1981)

- Born: October 25, 1981 (age 44) Oshawa, Ontario, Canada
- Height: 6 ft 2 in (188 cm)
- Weight: 185 lb (84 kg; 13 st 3 lb)
- Position: Centre
- Shoots: Left
- NLSHL team: Grand Falls-Windsor Cataracts
- Played for: Div.1; Karlskrona HK; CHL; Wichita Thunder; Odessa Jackalopes; Rapid City Rush; Ligue Magnus; Rapaces de Gap
- NHL draft: Undrafted
- Playing career: 2007–present

Collin Circelli (born October 25, 1981) is a Canadian professional ice hockey center who plays for the Grand Falls-Windsor Cataracts of the Newfoundland Senior Hockey League.

== Playing career ==
=== Amateur ===
Collin Circelli played in the Ontario Junior Hockey League with the Oshawa Legionaires from 1998 to 2000, before he joined the Moncton Wildcats of the Quebec Major Junior Hockey League for two seasons. With the Wildcats, Circelli posted 128 points (45 goals, 83 assists) in 135 games. From 2002 to 2007, he played for the University of Saint Francis Xavier University in CIS .

=== Professional ===
Following the 2007 season, Circelli turned professional with the Wichita Thunder of the Central Hockey League. After eight games, he was acquired by the Odessa Jackalopes. He remained there until 2010 to play in Europe in the club Karlskrona HK in the Swedish Division 1. He finished top scorer on the team with 120 goals and 240 assists in 37 regular season games. In 2011, he returned to the CHL with the Rapid City Rush.

On May 12, 2012, Circelli ventured back to Europe with Rapaces de Gap in the French Ligue Magnus for the 2012–2013 season.

After two seasons with Gap, Circelli opted to return to the CHL with the Missouri Mavericks on July 17, 2014.

On October 7, 2014, soon before the 2014–15 Central Hockey League season was set to begin, it was announced that the Central Hockey League ceased operations and the Mavericks, along with the Allen Americans, Brampton Beast, Quad City Mallards, Rapid City Rush, Tulsa Oilers, and Wichita Thunder, were all admitted to the ECHL for the 2014–15 ECHL season. All Central Hockey League contracts that had already been signed by players for the 2014-15 Central Hockey League season were immediately nullified.

On October 17, 2014, Circelli signed with the Grand Falls-Windsor Cataracts of the Newfoundland Senior Hockey League.

== Career statistics ==
			Regular season					Playoffs
Season	Team	League	GP	G	A	Pts	PIM	GP	G	A	Pts	PIM
1998–99	Oshawa Legionnaires	OPJHL	47	17	23	40	6	—	—	—	—	—
1999–00	Oshawa Legionnaires	OPJHL	47	18	33	51	20	—	—	—	—	—
2000–01	Moncton Wildcats	QMJHL	67	21	36	57	41	—	—	—	—	—
2001–02	Moncton Wildcats	QMJHL	68	24	47	71	42	—	—	—	—	—
2002–03	St. Francis Xavier University	CIS	6	1	2	3	0	—	—	—	—	—
2003–04	St. Francis Xavier University	CIS	27	4	8	12	8	—	—	—	—	—
2004–05	St. Francis Xavier University	CIS	25	3	9	12	18	—	—	—	—	—
2005–06	St. Francis Xavier University	CIS	26	8	19	27	14	—	—	—	—	—
2006–07	St. Francis Xavier University	CIS	15	5	8	13	28	—	—	—	—	—
2007–08	Wichita Thunder	CHL	8	0	1	1	4	—	—	—	—	—
2007–08	Odessa Jackalopes	CHL	31	7	4	11	23	7	5	1	6	0
2008–09	Odessa Jackalopes	CHL	63	26	23	49	58	13	2	2	4	10
2009–10	Odessa Jackalopes	CHL	63	37	35	72	41	13	3	11	14	10
2010–11	Karlskrona HK	Div.1	37	16	24	40	44	10	2	4	6	6
2011–12	Rapid City Rush	CHL	47	15	22	37	56	6	2	3	5	9
2012–13	Rapaces de Gap	FRA	26	17	9	26	26	3	1	1	2	8
2013–14	Rapaces de Gap	FRA	20	6	13	19	24	8	3	3	6	2
CHL totals			212	85	85	170	182	39	12	17	29	29
