= Collin Burns =

American speedcuber

Collin Burns is an American speedcuber who formerly held the world record for solving the Rubik’s Cube in 5.25 seconds.

== Biography ==
In 2014, Burns set a North American continental record of 5.93 seconds for solving the 3×3×3 cube, and he beat the world champion at the time, Feliks Zemdegs, in the US Nationals 2014 speedcubing competition.

On April 25, 2015, Burns set the world record for the fastest 3×3×3 Rubik's Cube single solve with a time of 5.25. The solve was recorded at a Rubik's Cube competition at Central Bucks West High School in Doylestown, Pennsylvania. He set the record age 15, and used the YuXin brand 3×3×3 cube. Burns solved the cube 0.3 seconds faster than the previous world record of 5.55 seconds, set by Mats Valk. His record lasted approximately seven months until being broken by Lucas Etter with a time of 4.90 on November 21, 2015.

Burns is now a researcher in the field of AI alignment. In 2020, a team of researchers, including Dan Hendrycks and Burns, developed the Massive Multitask Language Understanding (MMLU) model, a benchmark to assess large-language models.
