= Collin d'Harleville =

French dramatist (1755–1806)

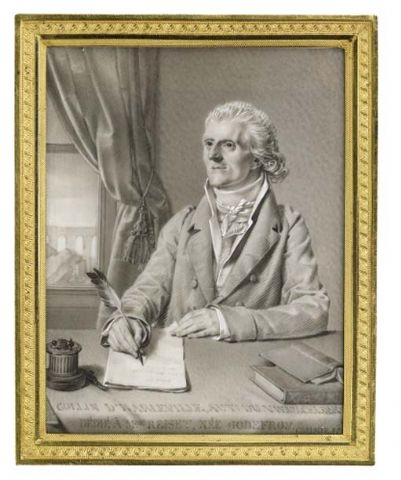
- Born: Jean-François Collin d'Harleville; 30 May 1755; Maintenon (Eure-et-Loir) France
- Died: 24 February 1806 (aged 50); Paris, France
- Occupation: dramatist
- Known for: original member, Institute of France
- Notable work: L'Inconstan, Le vieux célibataire

Jean-François Collin d'Harleville (30 May 1755 – 24 February 1806) was a French dramatist.

He was born at Maintenon (Eure-et-Loir). His first dramatic success was L'Inconstant, a comedy accepted by the Comédie Française in 1780, but not produced there until six years later, though it was played elsewhere in 1784. This was followed by L'Optimiste, ou l'homme toujours content (1788), and Châteaux en Espagne (1789). His best play, Le vieux célibataire, appeared in 1793.

Among his other plays are the one-act comedy Monsieur de Crac dans son petit castel (1791), Les Artistes (1796), Les Mœurs du jour (1800) and Malice pour malice (1803).

Collin was one of the original members of the Institute of France, and died in Paris.

The 1822 edition of his Théâtre et poésies fugitives contains a notice by his friend the dramatist François Andrieux. His Théâtre was also edited by Louis Moland in 1876; and by Edouard Thierry in 1882.

== Works ==
- 1786: L'Inconstant, comedy in 3 acts and in verse, Paris, Comédie-Française, 13 June, Text online

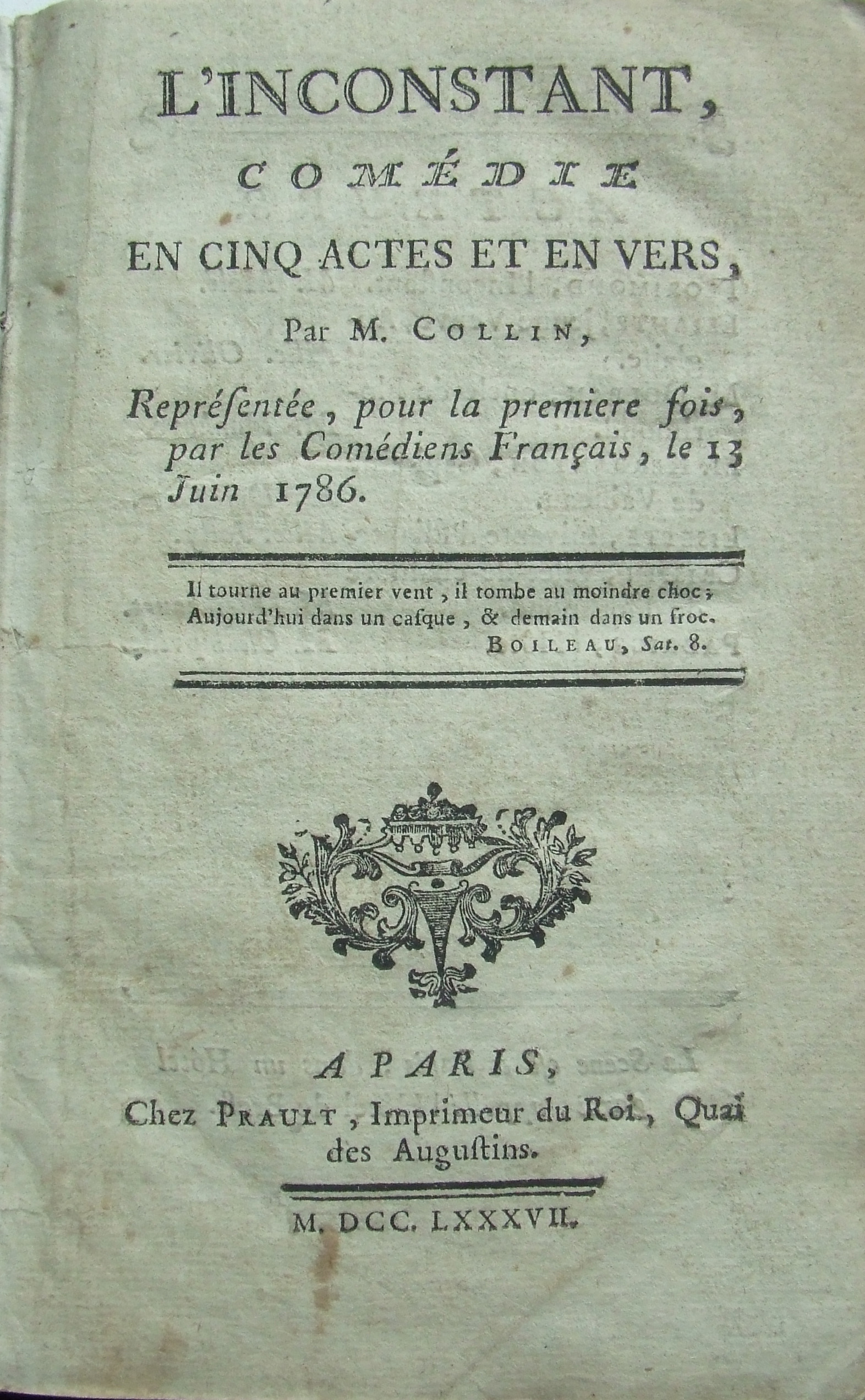
J.-Fr. Collin d'Harleville. L'Inconstant. 1787

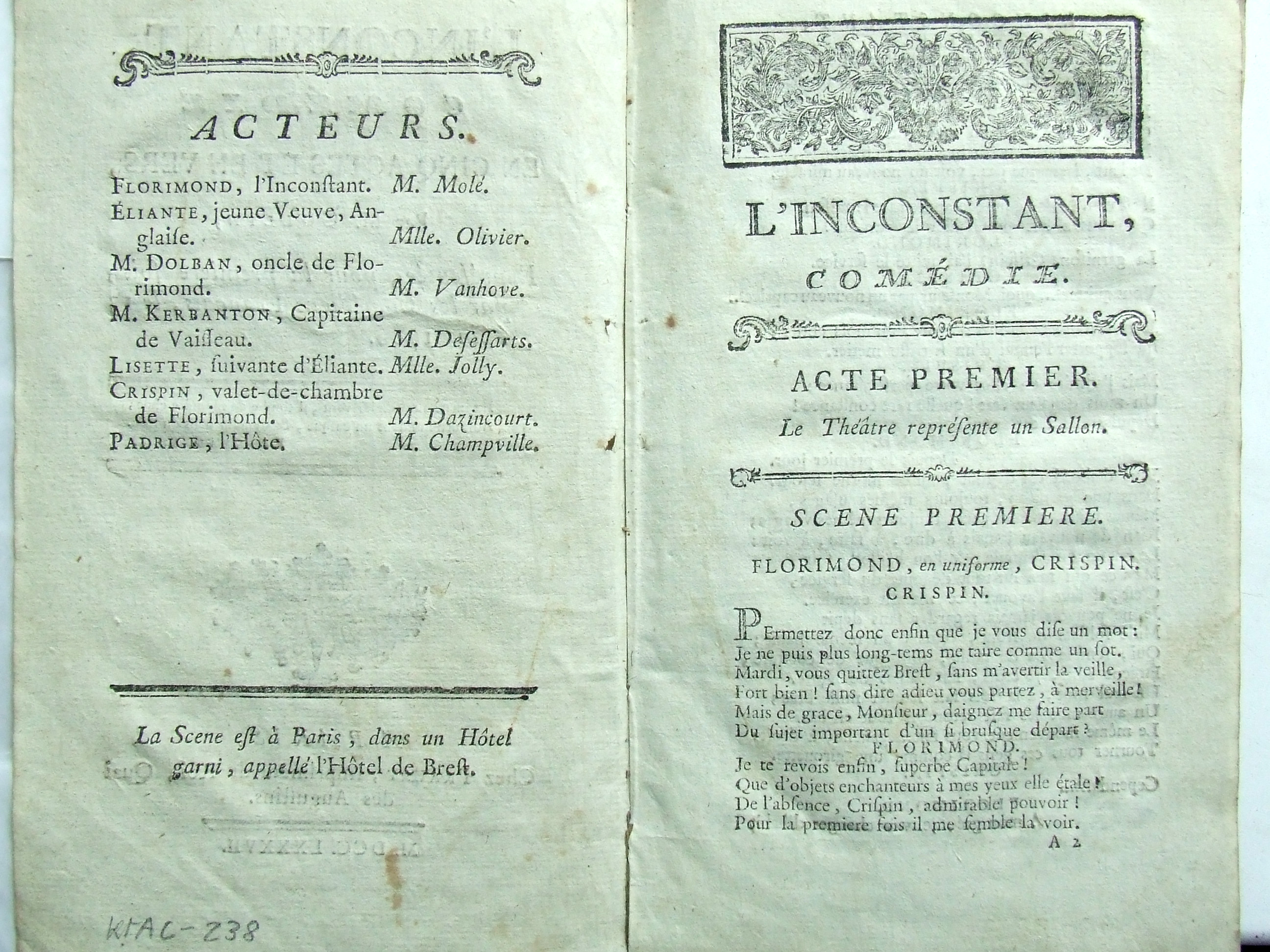
J.-Fr. Collin d'Harleville. L'Inconstant. 1787

- 1788: L'Optimiste, ou l'homme toujours content, comedy, Paris, Comédie-Française, 22 February, Text online
- 1789: Les Châteaux en Espagne, comedy in 5 acts and in verse, Paris, Comédie-Française, 20 February, Text online
- 1791: Monsieur de Crac dans son petit castel, ou les Gascons, comedy in 1 act and in vers with a divertissement, Paris, Comédie-Française, 4 March, Text online
- Le Vieux célibataire, comedy in 5 acts and in verse, Paris, Théâtre de la Nation, 24 February, Text online
- 1794: Malice pour malice, comedy in 3 acts and in verse, Paris, Théâtre Louvois, 18 pluviôse an II (6 February)
- 1794: Rose et Picard, ou suite de l'Optimiste, comedy in 1 act and in verse with 1 comédie en vaudeville and couplets, music by Nicolas Dalayrac, Text online
- 1796: Être et paraître, ou les Deux voisins, comedy in five acts and in verse, Paris, Théâtre de la rue Feydeau
- 1796: Les Artistes, play in 4 acts and in verse, Paris, 19 brumaire an V (9 November). Text online
- 1799: Melpomène et Thalie, poème allégorique en 2 chants, lu à la séance publique de l'Institut National, le 15 nivôse an VII, par le citoyen Colin Harleville (4 January)
- 1800: Les Mœurs du jour, ou l'École des jeunes femmes, comedy in 5 acts and in verse, Paris, théâtre français de la République, 7 thermidor an VIII (26 July). Text online
- 1803: Le Veuf amoureux ou la Véritable amie, comedy in three acts and in verse, Paris, Comédie-Française, 30 March.
- 1803: Le Vieillard et les jeunes gens, comedy in five acts, in verse, Paris, Théâtre Louvois, 15 prairial an XI (4 June).
- 1804: Il veut tout faire, comédie épisodique in 1 act and in verse, Paris, Théâtre Louvois, 21 pluviôse an XII (11 February).
- 1808: Les Querelles des deux frères, ou la Famille bretonne, comedy in 3 acts, in verse, Paris, Théâtre de l'Impératrice, 17 November.
- Œuvres de Collin d'Harleville (4 volumes, 1821). Text online 1 2 3 4
