= Collin Hansen =

American journalist

Collin Hansen (born April 7, 1981) is an American journalist who serves as vice president for content and editor in chief for the Gospel Coalition. He is best known for his writing on the New Calvinism, and he hosts the Gospelbound podcast.

== Biography and education ==
Hansen is from Chester, South Dakota. He received an undergraduate degree in history and journalism from Northwestern University. He earned a Master of Divinity from Trinity Evangelical Divinity School. Prior to working for the Gospel Coalition, Hansen was an associate editor for Christianity Today. He lives with his wife and children in Birmingham, Alabama, and serves on the advisory board of Beeson Divinity School. He is the founder of the Shelby Foote Society.

== New Calvinism ==
Hansen is considered an expert on the New Calvinism, a term that was coined for the title of his 2008 book Young, Restless, Reformed: A Journalist's Journey With the New Calvinists. He has been quoted on the movement by Time and The New York Times.

== Books ==
- Young, Restless, Reformed: A Journalist's Journey With the New Calvinists ISBN 1581349408
- A God-Sized Vision: Revival Stories That Stretch and Stir (coauthor with John D. Woodbridge) ISBN 0310327032
- Four Views on the Spectrum of Evangelicalism (coeditor with Andrew Naselli) ISBN 0310293162
- Blind Spots: Becoming a Courageous, Compassionate, and Commissioned Church ISBN 143354623X
- Gospelbound: Living with Resolute Hope in an Anxious Age (coauthored with Sarah Eekhoff Zylstra) ISBN 9780593193570
- Rediscover Church: Why the Body of Christ is Essential (coauthored with Jonathan Leeman) ISBN 9781433583292
- Timothy Keller: His Spiritual and Intellectual Formation
