= Collin Thompson =

Collin Thompson (born in Toronto, Ontario) is a Hong Kong–based fashion designer, filmmaker, and entrepreneur.

== Career ==
He has won two Canadian figure skating championships, one in 1993 at the novice level and another in 1996 at the junior level. Thompson is a two-time recipient of the Royal Bank of Canada Golden Blade Award. In 2007 he founded CIPHER, an urban lifestyle fashion sneaker brand. His sneakers have been praised by people such as CNN's Zoe Li.

On July 26, 2011, Collin was nominated by Invest Hong Kong and ratified by the Hong Kong Secretary for Commerce Greg So to become an Investment Promotions Ambassador for the Hong Kong Government to advise on foreign direct investment and global competitiveness.
