= Colin Heydt =

American philosopher

- Awards: NEH Fellowship, ACLS Fellowship

Education
- Education: Boston University (PhD, 2003), Swarthmore College (BA, 1994)
- Thesis: The Ethics of Character: John Stuart Mill on Aesthetic Education (2003)
- Doctoral advisor: Knud Haakonssen

Philosophical work
- Era: 21st-century philosophy
- Region: Western philosophy
- Institutions: University of South Florida
- Main interests: Moral philosophy, eighteenth-century philosophy, ethics, history of philosophy

Colin Heydt is an American philosopher and professor of philosophy at the University of South Florida. His research focuses on eighteenth-century moral and political philosophy, particularly the ethical and cultural thought of David Hume and Adam Smith.

Heydt is the author of Rethinking Mill’s Ethics (2006) and Moral Philosophy in Eighteenth‑Century Britain (2018), and the editor of John Mill Stuart's Utilitarianism (2010). According to a review, Rethinking Mill’s Ethics (2006) examines Mill's political philosophy, ethics, and moral psychology. Moral Philosophy in Eighteenth‑Century Britain (2018) has been described as a significant work in the field.

== Books ==
- Heydt, Colin (2006). Rethinking Mill's Ethics: Character and Aesthetic Education. Continuum Books. ISBN 0826486398.
- Heydt, Colin (2018). Moral Philosophy in Eighteenth-Century Britain: God, Self, and Other. Cambridge: Cambridge University Press. ISBN 978-1-108-42109-6.
- Mill, John Stuart (2010). Heydt, Colin (ed.). Utiliarianism. Broadview Press. ISBN 978-1-551-11501-6.
