= Collin Mooney =

American football player (born 1986)

Collin Mooney Sr.
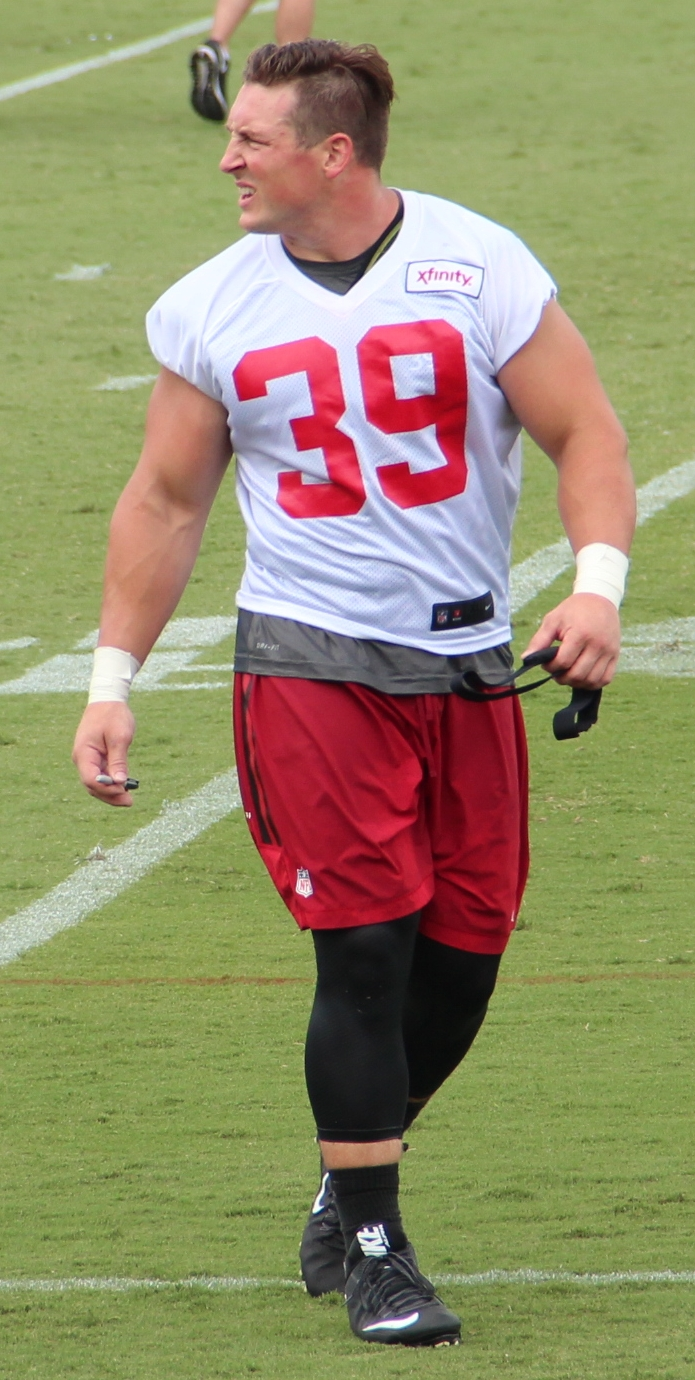
- Mooney with the Atlanta Falcons in 2015

Profile
- Position: Fullback

Personal information
- Born: April 3, 1986 (age 40); Houston, Texas, U.S.
- Listed height: 5 ft 10 in (1.78 m)
- Listed weight: 247 lb (112 kg)

Career information
- High school: Katy (TX) Taylor
- College: Army
- NFL draft: 2012: undrafted

Career history
- Tennessee Titans (2012–2013); Atlanta Falcons (2015)

Career NFL statistics
- Rushing yards: 19
- Rushing average: 3.8
- Receptions: 6
- Receiving yards: 32
- Stats at Pro Football Reference

Collin Karl Mooney (born April 3, 1986) is an American former professional football player who was a fullback in the National Football League (NFL). He played college football for the Army Black Knights of the United States Military Academy. Mooney is West Point's all-time single-season rushing leader with 1,339 yards. In the last play of the 2008 Army–Navy Game, his final college game, he bested Mike Mayweather's record by a single yard. Mooney played for the Tennessee Titans of the NFL during the 2012 and 2013 seasons, and later for the Atlanta Falcons.

== Early life ==
Mooney was born in Houston, Texas to Chuck and Kris Mooney. Mooney attended highschool at James E. Taylor where he played on both sides of the ball as a fullback and linebacker. He was a three-year letterwinner in football and earned All-Academic team honors all four years. Mooney also played baseball and belonged to the National Honor Society.

== College career ==
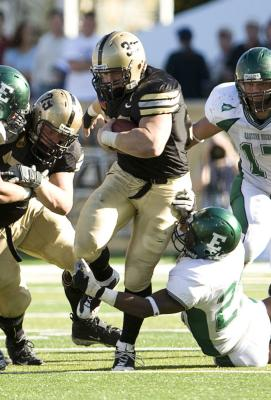
Mooney rushes against Eastern Michigan.

Mooney first played in the 2006 season and saw action in nine games, including a role on special teams. In 2007, Mooney played as a back-up in all 12 games.

In 2008, Mooney ran for a school record 1,339 yards in 12 games. In an overtime loss against Buffalo, Mooney rushed for 172 yards and two touchdowns including an 81-yard touchdown run. For his performance against the Bulls, who went on to beat undefeated Ball State for the MAC championship, Mooney was honored with a "helmet sticker" by ESPN. In a loss at Rice, Mooney picked up 61 yards in a touchdown run. Mooney scored four touchdowns in the 44–13 victory over Tulane. For this, he was bestowed West Point's Black Death Award for "near perfect play", named the Army Athletic Association Athlete of the Week, and nominated for the AT&T All-America Player of the Week honors.

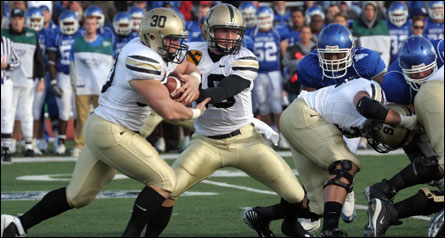
Collin Mooney (#30) takes a hand-off from Chip Bowden (#10) against Buffalo.

In the last play of his final game for West Point, the 2008 Army–Navy Game, Mooney beat the old school record for single-season rushing by one yard, setting the new record at 1,339 yards. The record was previously held by Mike Mayweather, who still holds the West Point record for career rushing. Army defensive coordinator John Mumford caused some controversy earlier in the season when he stated that "Collin Mooney is probably better than any Navy fullback we've ever faced. Not to compliment Navy, but that's a compliment to Collin."

Mooney played for the East squad in the 2009 East-West Shrine Game. He served three years as an Army officer before being granted a release to play professional football.

=== Statistics ===
Army		Rushing					Receiving					Returning
Season	Games	Att	Yds	Avg	Lg	TD	Rec	Yds	Avg	Lg	TD	Kick	Yds	Lg	TD
2006	9	1	9	9.0	9	1	0	0	0	0	0	3	37	21	0
2007	12	5	13	2.6	6	0	5	45	9.0	21	0	2	39	21	0
2008	12	231	1,339	5.8	81	8	9	59	6.6	26	0	0	0	0	0
Career	33	237	1,361	5.7	81	9	14	104	7.4	26	0	5	76	21	0

== Professional career ==
Mooney was signed by the Tennessee Titans on May 1, 2012 after going undrafted in the 2012 NFL draft. After seeing modest playing time in the 2012 and 2013 seasons for the team, Mooney was waived by the Tennessee Titans on August 29, 2014.
