= Kuhl =

Kuhl is a German language surname.

== Notable people ==
- Carolyn Kuhl (born 1952), American judge
- Chad Kuhl (born 1992), American baseball player
- Charles Kuhl (1915–1971), American soldier, slapped by General Patton
- Don Kuhl, Canadian politician
- Ellen Kuhl, German biomechanical engineer
- Ernst Kuhl (1843–1911), German engineer
- Heinrich Kuhl (1797–1821), German zoologist
- Hermann von Kuhl (1856–1958), Prussian general
- Patricia K. Kuhl, American professor of speech and hearing sciences
- Randy Kuhl (born 1943), American politician from New York
- Walter Frederick Kuhl (1905–1991), Canadian politician and teacher

== See also ==
- Kühl/Kuehl
- Kohl
- Koehl
- Kuhle
- Kuhler
