= Kuhler =

Kuhler, or Kühler, is a surname of German origin. Notable people with the surname include:

- Ingeborg Kühler (born 1943), German architect
- Lorraine Kuhler (born 1990), English lawn and indoor bowler
- Louis Kuhler (1902–1925), American tennis player
- Otto Kuhler (1894–1977), German-American industrial designer and artist
- Renaldo Kuhler (1931–2013), American scientific illustrator

== See also ==
- Kohler
- Koehler
- Kuhle
- Kuehl
- Kohl
