= Kohl (surname) =

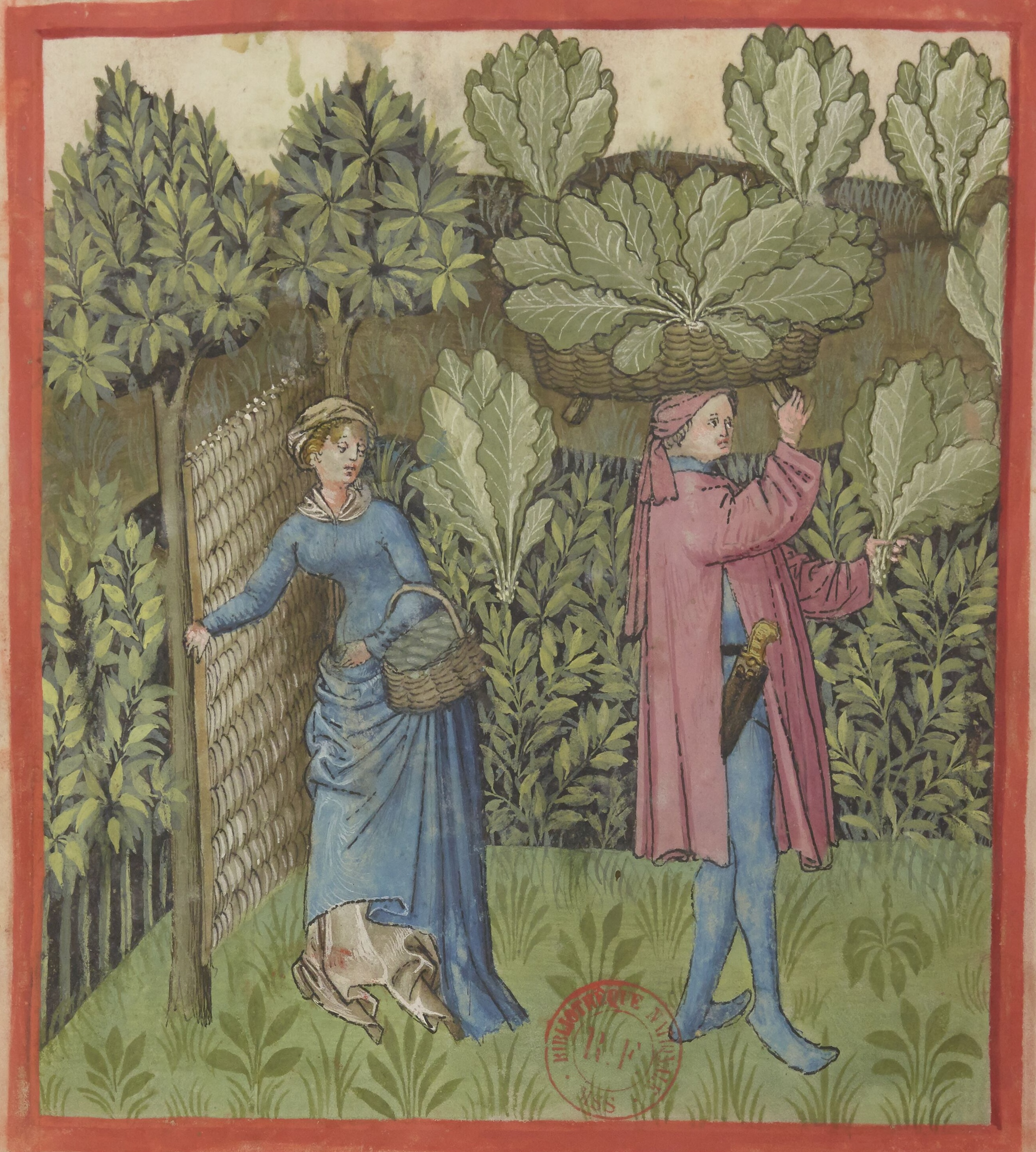
- Cabbage harvest illustration, Tacuinum Sanitatis (15th century).
- Pronunciation: German pronunciation: [koːl]
- Language: German language

Origin
- Languages: Middle High German: kōl, kœl, kœle Old High German: kōlo Latin: caulis ("stalk", "stem")
- Origin: Kohl
- Meaning: Cabbage
- Region of origin: Germanosphere sprachraum

Other names
- Variant form: Upper German: Koehl/Köhl

Kohl is a German surname derived from the word kohl, meaning cabbage. It tends to originate as an occupational name for a merchant or cultivator of the crops.

Cabbage was most likely domesticated somewhere in Europe in Ancient history before 1000 BC. Cabbage in the cuisine has been documented since Antiquity. It was described as a table luxury in the Roman Empire. By the Middle Ages, cabbage had become a prominent part of European cuisine, as indicated by manuscript illuminations. New variates were introduced from the Renaissance on, mostly by Germanic-speaking peoples.

== Notable people with the surname ==
- Astrid Kohl (born 1968), German businesswoman, interior designer, and wife of Prince Alexander of Liechtenstein
- Bernhard Kohl (born 1982), Austrian professional cyclist
- Christiane Kohl, German soprano
- Christoph Kohl (born 1900), German chemist and industrial leader
- Christoph Kohl (architect) (1961–2025), Italian-German architect and urban planner
- Franz Friedrich Kohl (1851–1924), Austrian entomologist
- Hagen Kohl (born 1969), German politician
- Hannelore Kohl (1933–2001), wife of Helmut Kohl
- Helmut Kohl (1930–2017), Chancellor of Germany 1982–1998
- Herb Kohl (1935–2023), United States Senator
- Herbert R. Kohl (born 1937), United States writer
- Jeanne Kohl-Welles (born 1942), American politician
- Jerome Kohl (1946–2020), American musicologist
- Joseph Kohl (1831–1917), third mayor of Neutral Moresnet
- Katharina Kohl (born 1992), German politician
- Lia Kohl, a classical composer and cellist
- Ludwig Kohl-Larsen (1884–1969), a German physician, amateur anthropologist, and explorer
- Peter Kohl (born 1965), German businessman and author
- Peter Kohl (scientist), German physiologist
- Ryan Kohl, American politician
- Sheryl Davis Kohl (born 1962), American politician
- Sisca Kohl (born 2002), Indonesian internet celebrity

== See also ==
- Kohler
