= Kohol =

Kohol may refer to:

Villages in Iran

- Kohol, Ahar, in Ahar County, East Azerbaijan Province
- Kohol, East Azerbaijan, in Shabestar County, East Azerbaijan Province
- Aghcheh Kohol, in Nir County, Ardabil Province
- Beneh Kohol, in Bostanabad County, East Azerbaijan Province

Other

- Kohol, the local Philippine name for the invasive Golden Apple Snail

== See also ==
- Kahal (disambiguation)
- Kehel (disambiguation)
- Kohal, Kurdistan, a village in Bijar County, Kurdistan Province
- Kohl (disambiguation)
