= Koehl =

- Pronunciation: German pronunciation: [køːl] French pronunciation: [kœl]
- Language: German language

Origin
- Origin: Standard German: Kuehl
- Meaning: "Cool"; "cold"
- Region of origin: Alsace, Baden-Württemberg, Bavaria, Swabia, Switzerland

Other names
- Alternative spelling: Köhl (Francisation: Kœhl)

Koehl, also transliterated Köhl, is a German surname.

According to one etymology, in the southern Germanosphere, it constitutes an Upper German umlaut variant of the Standard German epithetic surname Kuehl. Thus derived from a byname of the word kuehl, meaning "cool"; "cold".

Koehl
- Language: German language

Origin
- Origin: Lower German: Kohl
- Meaning: Cabbage
- Region of origin: Northern Germany

Other names
- Alternative spelling: Köhl

According to another etymology, in the northern Germanosphere, it constitutes a Lower German umlaut variant of the Standard German surname Kohl. Thus derived from the word kohl, meaning cabbage, presumably an agricultural occupational name.

== People ==
- Albert Koehl (born 1959), Canadian lawyer and writer
- Albert Köhl (1879–1954), German-Swedish chef de cuisine
- Dan Koehl (born 1959), French-Swedish elephant trainer
- Ditmar Koel (1500–1563), German politician
- Émile Koehl (1921–2013), French politician
- Georg Köhl (1910–1944), German football player
- Hermann Köhl (1888–1938), German aviator
- Laurent Koehl (born 1971), French tenor
- M. A. R. Koehl (born 1948), American marine biologist and Professor at University of California, Berkeley
- Matt Koehl (1935–2014), leader of the American Nazi Party
- Keith Koehl, American Catholic prelate
- Robert B. Koehl, American archaeologist
- Robert Lewis Koehl (1922–2015), U.S. Army Intelligence surveyor, and Professor Emeritus of history at the University of Wisconsin-Madison
- Wade Koehl (born 1984), American football player

== Other ==
- Koehl Lab, Department of Integrative Biology, University of California, Berkeley

== See also ==
- Kuehl
- Kohl
