= Khol (disambiguation) =

A khol is a double-headed clay drum of eastern India.

Khol may also refer to:

- KHOL, a radio station in Jackson Hole, Wyoming, United States
- KHOL-TV, a television station in Kearney, Nebraska, United States
- Lakhon Khol, a Cambodian masked dance

== People with the surname ==
- Andreas Khol (born 1941), Austrian politician

== See also ==
- Kohl (disambiguation)
