= Progress in Biophysics and Molecular Biology =

- Discipline: Biophysics; Molecular biology
- Language: English
- Edited by: Denis Noble; Tom Blundell; Delphine Dean

Publication details
- Former name(s): Progress in Biophysics and Biophysical Chemistry
- History: 1950–present
- Publisher: Elsevier
- Frequency: 9 issues/year
- Impact factor: 3.667 (2020)

Standard abbreviations
- ISO 4: Prog. Biophys. Mol. Biol.

Indexing
- CODEN: PBIMAC
- ISSN: 0079-6107 (print); 1873-1732 (web)
- LCCN: 50011295
- OCLC no.: 884381524

Links
- Journal homepage; Online access; Online archive

Progress in Biophysics and Molecular Biology is a peer-reviewed scientific journal publishing review articles in the fields of biophysics and molecular biology. It was established in 1950 as Progress in Biophysics and Biophysical Chemistry, obtaining its current title in 1963.

It is published by Elsevier and the editors-in-chief are Denis Noble (University of Oxford), Tom Blundell (University of Cambridge), and Delphine Dean (Clemson University). According to the Journal Citation Reports, the journal has a 2020 impact factor of 3.667, and a CiteScore of 5.8.

== History ==
First published in 1950, under the title Progress in Biophysics and Biophysical Chemistry, its original format was as a hardback book issued annually containing specialist reviews of important papers in the various different fields. Its multi-disciplinary coverage spanning biological and physical science disciplines was novel at that time, anticipating a trend that developed over the following decades. It was well regarded from the publication of the first edition, with one reviewer describing it as "refreshingly different", and recommended "for advanced students who want a comprehensive review of various phases of biophysics, biophysical chemistry, physiology, and the theoretical basis of specialized experimental techniques".

The founding editors were physicist Sir John Randall and the biochemist John Alfred Valentine Butler. Both had been closely involved with early work on the structure of DNA, Butler in early identification of the histone action in the inhibiting of DNA template action at the Chester Beatty Institute of the University of London, and Randall as director of the King's College London lab where Maurice Wilkes and Rosalind Franklin performed their experiments to determine the helical structure of DNA. The first volume included topics including the novel technique of X-ray crystallography of protein molecules, and the mechanical and thermal properties of muscle fibre operation.

When Randall stepped down in 1957 he was succeeded by Sir Bernard Katz FRS, and in 1961 by Hugh Huxley. Denis Noble FRS became editor when Huxley retired in 1967, and was joined by SirTom Blundell FRS as co-editor in 1979. From 2018 to 2020, they were joined by Peter Kohl.

The publisher was Pergamon Press, which was taken over in 1951 by Robert Maxwell shortly after publication of the first issue. Maxwell wanted to convert the format to a general biophysical journal rather than an annual review in book form, a suggestion strongly resisted by Butler. From 1969 onwards, more frequent paperback issues were released, and the annual hardback edition was discontinued after Butler's death in 1977. In 1991, Maxwell sold Pergamon to Elsevier, although there is some doubt as to whether the sale was completed until after Maxwell's death and the collapse of his business empire.

In more recent years the journal has increasingly supported interdisciplinary and integrative research through "Themed Issues", often linked to high level discussion meetings on related topics. The overall emphasis remains on the synthesis of both reductionist and integrationist approaches, as well as combining structural and functional viewpoints.

== Some influential papers and reviews ==
Reviews, articles and papers have stimulated notable lines of research in a wide variety of fields, as well as occasionally provoking controversy and debate. Some examples include:

=== Muscle metabolism ===
- Huxley, A.F. (1957). "Muscle Structure and Theories of Contraction". Progress in Biophysics and Biophysical Chemistry. 7: 255–318. doi:10.1016/S0096-4174(18)30128-8. PMID 13485191. 4456 citations in "Google Scholar". 2022-03-18.
- Woledge, Roger C. (1971). "Heat Production and chemical change in muscle". Progress in Biophysics and Molecular Biology. 22: 37–74. doi:10.1016/0079-6107(71)90004-6. 117 citations in "Google Scholar". 2022-03-18.

=== The role of histones ===
- Butler, J.A.V.; Johns, E.W.; Phillips, D.M.P. (1968). "Recent investigations on histones and their functions". Progress in Biophysics and Molecular Biology. 18: 209–244. doi:10.1016/0079-6107(68)90025-4. PMID 4894871. 68 citations in "Google Scholar". 2022-03-18.

=== Cardiac regulation mechanisms ===
- Hartzell, H.Criss (1988). "Regulation of cardiac ion channels by catecholamines, acetylcholine and second messenger systems". Progress in Biophysics and Molecular Biology. 52 (3): 165–247. doi:10.1016/0079-6107(88)90014-4. PMID 2477870. 474 citations in "Google Scholar". 2022-03-18.
- Vigmond, E.J.; Weber dos Santos, R.; Prassl, A.J.; Deo, M.; Plank, G. (January 2008). "Solvers for the cardiac bidomain equations". Progress in Biophysics and Molecular Biology. 96 (1–3): 3–18. doi:10.1016/j.pbiomolbio.2007.07.012. PMC 2881536. PMID 17900668. 343 citations in "Google Scholar". 2022-03-18.
- Kohl, Peter; Hunter, Peter; Noble, Denis (January 1999). "Stretch-induced changes in heart rate and rhythm: clinical observations, experiments and mathematical models". Progress in Biophysics and Molecular Biology. 71 (1): 91–138. doi:10.1016/s0079-6107(98)00038-8. PMID 10070213. 342 citations in "Google Scholar". 2022-03-18.

=== RNA virus replication ===
- Lodish, Harvey F. (1968). "The replication of RNA-containing bacteriophages". Progress in Biophysics and Molecular Biology. 18: 285–312. doi:10.1016/0079-6107(68)90027-8. PMID 4894873.

=== DNA virus replication ===
- Stone, Alan B. (1970). "The replication of DNA-containing viruses". Progress in Biophysics and Molecular Biology. 20: 133–185. doi:10.1016/0079-6107(70)90015-5.

=== Vitamin D metabolic effects ===
- Lips, P. (September 2006). "Vitamin D physiology". Progress in Biophysics and Molecular Biology. 92 (1): 4–8. doi:10.1016/j.pbiomolbio.2006.02.016. PMID 16563471. 1580 citations in "Google Scholar". 2022-03-18.
- Zittermann, Armin (September 2006). "Vitamin D and disease prevention with special reference to cardiovascular disease". Progress in Biophysics and Molecular Biology. 92 (1): 39–48. doi:10.1016/j.pbiomolbio.2006.02.001. PMID 16600341. 729 citations in "Google Scholar". 2022-03-18.
- Cantorna, Margherita T. (September 2006). "Vitamin D and its role in immunology: Multiple sclerosis, and inflammatory bowel disease". Progress in Biophysics and Molecular Biology. 92 (1): 60–64. doi:10.1016/j.pbiomolbio.2006.02.020. PMID 16563470. 421 citations in "Google Scholar". 2022-03-18.

=== Origin of life ===
In 2018, the journal published a review article entitled "Cause of Cambrian Explosion – Terrestrial or Cosmic?" authored by over 30 authors, including Edward J.Steele and Chandra Wickramasinghe, which argued in favour of panspermia as the origin of the Cambrian explosion, and two articles arguing against that position by Keith Baverstock and Karin Mölling, both highly critical of the notion that life had originated elsewhere than on this planet. The panspermia article gained widespread derisive press coverage, and was described by Mark Carnall, a curator at the Oxford University Museum of Natural History, as "pseudoscience and nonsense".

The editorial of that issue authored by Noble commented that panspermia was a "highly controversial hypothesis with the majority of biologists dismissing it out of hand", and noted that the Origin of Life remained an unsolved problem, and that all conjectures on the topic at this time were speculative.
