= Kehel =

Kehel may refer to:

== Villages in Iran ==
- Kehel, Ardabil, in Khalkhal County, Ardabil Province
- Kehel Dasht, in Ardabil Province

== See also ==
- Kohol (disambiguation)
