= Robert Lewis Koehl =

Robert Lewis Koehl (6 March 1922 – 6 July 2015) was an American US Army Intelligence surveyor in Nazi German-occupied Europe during World War II, author, and a Professor Emeritus of history at the University of Wisconsin-Madison.

After the end of the war, Koehl made a name for himself for his research on national socialism, notably of studies on Heinrich Himmler as Reich Commissioner for the Consolidation of German Nationhood, as well as a pioneering work on the Nazi German Volkstumspolitik during the Occupation of Poland (1939–1945). Koehl coined the term "neofeudalism" for the characterization of the national socialist rule, and completed an account of the history of the SS in 1983.

== Biography ==
Robert Lewis Koehl was born on 6 March 1922 in Chicago, Illinois. He studied in at Harvard University, where he was admitted as member of Phi Beta Kappa society. In 1943, Koehl married Lieselotte Franziska Eisenhardt, who had emigrated from Nazi Germany in 1939, and the couple had three children.

During World War II he interrupted his studies for the war service, serving as surveyor and interpreter for the U.S. Army Intelligence in Nazi German-occupied Europe. He was trained at Camp Ritchie and was one of the Ritchie Boys.

Back in Harvard he acquired his Master of Arts in 1947 with the work A Prelude to the Third Reich. In 1950, he earned his Doctor degree on Heinrich Himmler as Reich Commissioner for the Consolidation of German Nationhood. He subsequently taught at Massachusetts Institute of Technology in Boston, at the University of Nebraska in Lincoln and from 1964 until his retirement 1997 in the Department of Educational Policy Studies of University of Wisconsin-Madison in Madison, a department of which he was an early founder.

== Research ==
Koehl's work focused on European history, especially the history of national socialism. His doctorate thesis, published in revised form in 1957, was mainly based on material of the RuSHA trial, and for a long time was one of few papers on the National Socialist Settlement and Population Policy in the German occupation of Poland.

Inspired by the feudalism concept, Koehl coined the term "neofeudalism" to describe national socialism. He wanted in particular to grasp the domination conditions in the German-occupied East, where German rule was personalized and local commanders had absolute power. This was an early attempt to understand the irrational aspects of national socialism. In pointing out the similarities between the charismatic elements of medieval and national socialist rule, Koehl opposed later attempts to conceive of national socialism as charismatic rule in the sense of Max Weber. However, recent research does not follow Koehl's assumption that the feudalist power relations originated from the atavistic ideology of national socialism.

Koehl also referred back to the term "Concentration Camp – SS". He thus designated a group of SS members in the concentration camps, which were not seconded to battlefields of the Waffen-SS. According to Karin Orth, Koehl's concept of historical reality corresponds to a national socialist functioneer elite. For Koehl, SS perpetrators were "social engineers". In 1983 he presented a complete version of the SS.

== Works ==
- The politics of resettlement. Univ. of Utah Press, Salt Lake City 1953.
- The Deutsche Volksliste in Poland, 1939–1945. In: Journal of Central European affairs. 15, Nr. 4 (1956), S. 354–366.
- RKFDV: German resettlement and population policy, 1939–1945;. A history of the Reich Commission for the Strengthening of Germandom. Harvard University Press, Cambridge 1957, ISBN 9780674773264.
- Toward an SS Typology: Social Engineers. In: The American Journal of Economics and Sociology 18.2 (1959): S. 113–126.
- Zeitgeschichte and the new German conservatism. In: Journal of Central European affairs. 20, Nr. 2 (1960), S. 131–157.
- Feudal Aspects of National Socialism. In: The American Political Science Review 54.4 (1960): 921–933.
- The Character of the Nazi SS. In: The Journal of Modern History 34.3 (1962): S. 275–283.
- The uses of the university. Past and present in Nigerian educational culture. Part 1. In: Comparative education review. The official organ of the Comparative Education Society.15.2 (1971), S. 116–131; Part 2, In: Comparative Education Review 15.3 (1971), S. 367–377.
- The comparative study of education. Prescription and practice. In: Comparative education review. The official organ of the Comparative Education Society. 21, Nr. 2/3 (1977), S. 177–194.
- The Black Corps. The structure and power struggles of the Nazi SS. Univ. of Wisconsin Press, Madison Wis. u.a. 1983, ISBN 0-299-09190-2.
  - The SS. A History, 1919–45. Tempus, Stroud 2000, ISBN 9780752417820.
