= Thierry Michels =

French politician

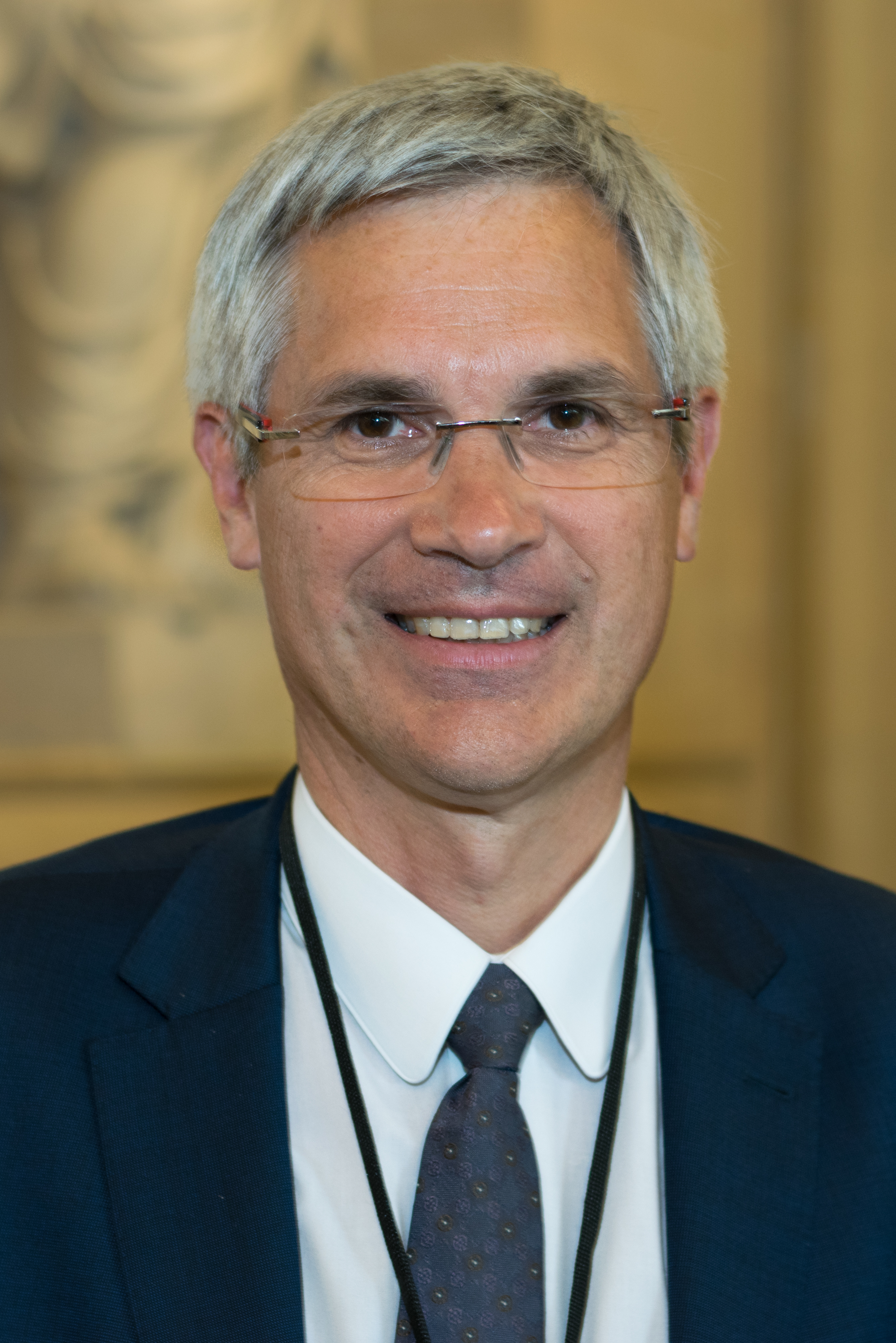

Member of the National Assembly for Bas-Rhin's 1st constituency
- In office 21 June 2017 – 21 June 2022
- Preceded by: Éric Elkouby
- Succeeded by: Sandra Regol

Personal details
- Born: 27 August 1960 (age 66) Strasbourg, France
- Party: En Marche
- Education: University of Ottawa, ESCP Business School

Thierry Michels (born 27 August 1960) is a French politician of La République En Marche! (LREM) who served as a member of the French National Assembly from 2017 to 2022, representing Bas-Rhin's 1st constituency.

In parliament, Michels served as member of the Committee on Social Affairs and the Committee on European Affairs. From 2019, he was also a member of the French delegation to the Franco-German Parliamentary Assembly.

Michel did not seeking re-election in the 2022 French legislative election.

== See also ==
- List of deputies of the 15th National Assembly of France
