= Technoseum =

Technology museum in Mannheim, Germany

Coordinates: 49°28′35″N 8°29′51″E

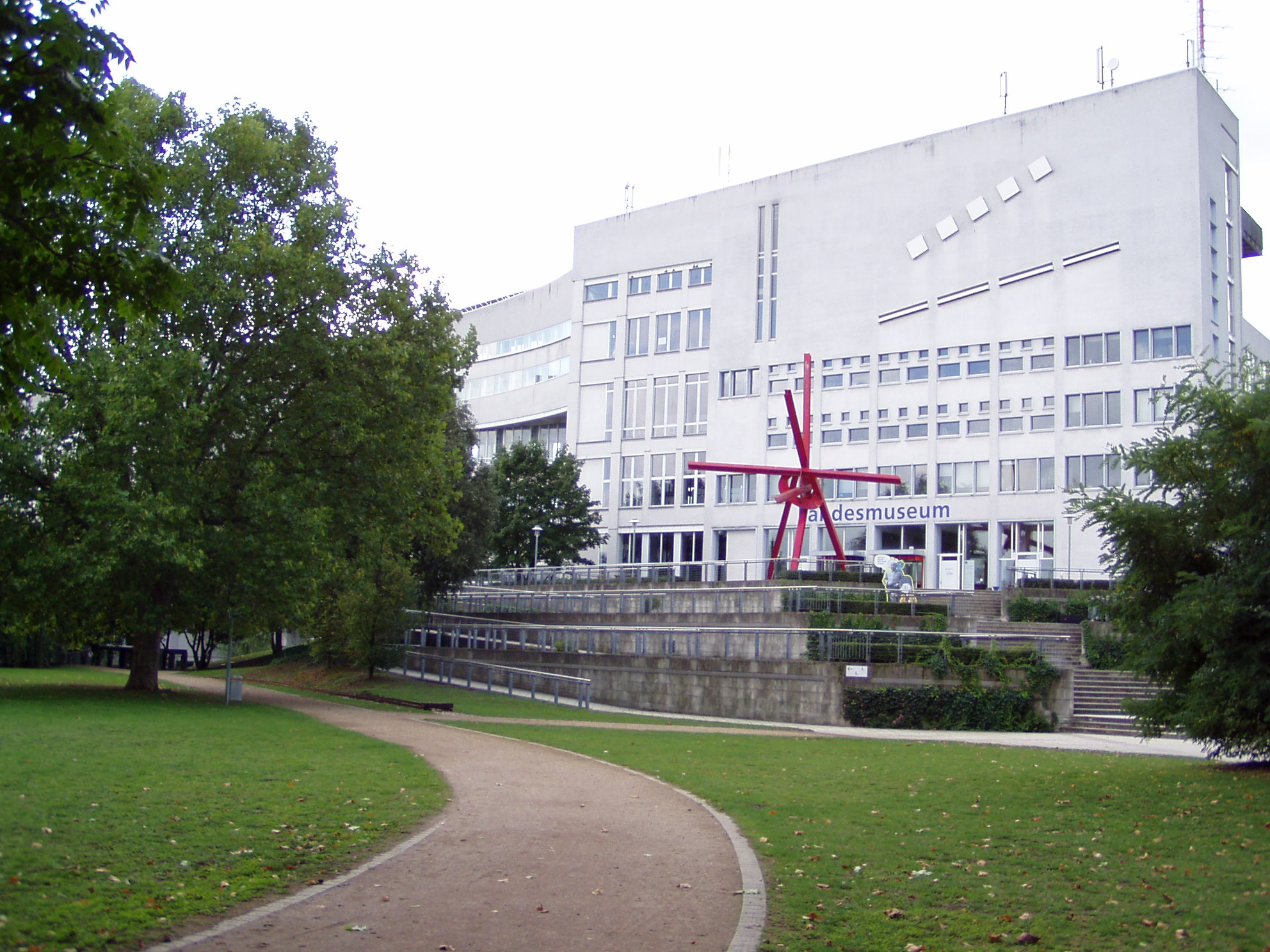
The Technoseum

The Technoseum (former name State Museum of Technology and Work, German: Landesmuseum für Technik und Arbeit) is a technology museum in Mannheim, Baden-Württemberg, Germany, with displays covering the industrialisation of the south-western regions of the country.

The museum building was designed by the Berlin architect Ingeborg Kühler. Its planning and construction period lasted from 1982 to 1990.

== Permanent exhibitions ==
Visitors who walk through the building from top to bottom will experience a journey in time from the beginning of the industrial revolution in the state of Baden-Württemberg to the present day.

Stands portraying the technical, social and political changes since the 18th century include those on clocks, paper manufacture and weaving. There are displays of living and working premises as well as machinery from the fields of industry, transport and the office. These displays enable the visitor to gain a graphic understanding of the far-reaching changes in living and working conditions right up to the present.

The Elementa workshop complements the themes and exhibits of technological, economic and social history shown to date. It is not limited to covering basic scientific principles, but also shows the technical inventions which resulted from various scientific experiments.

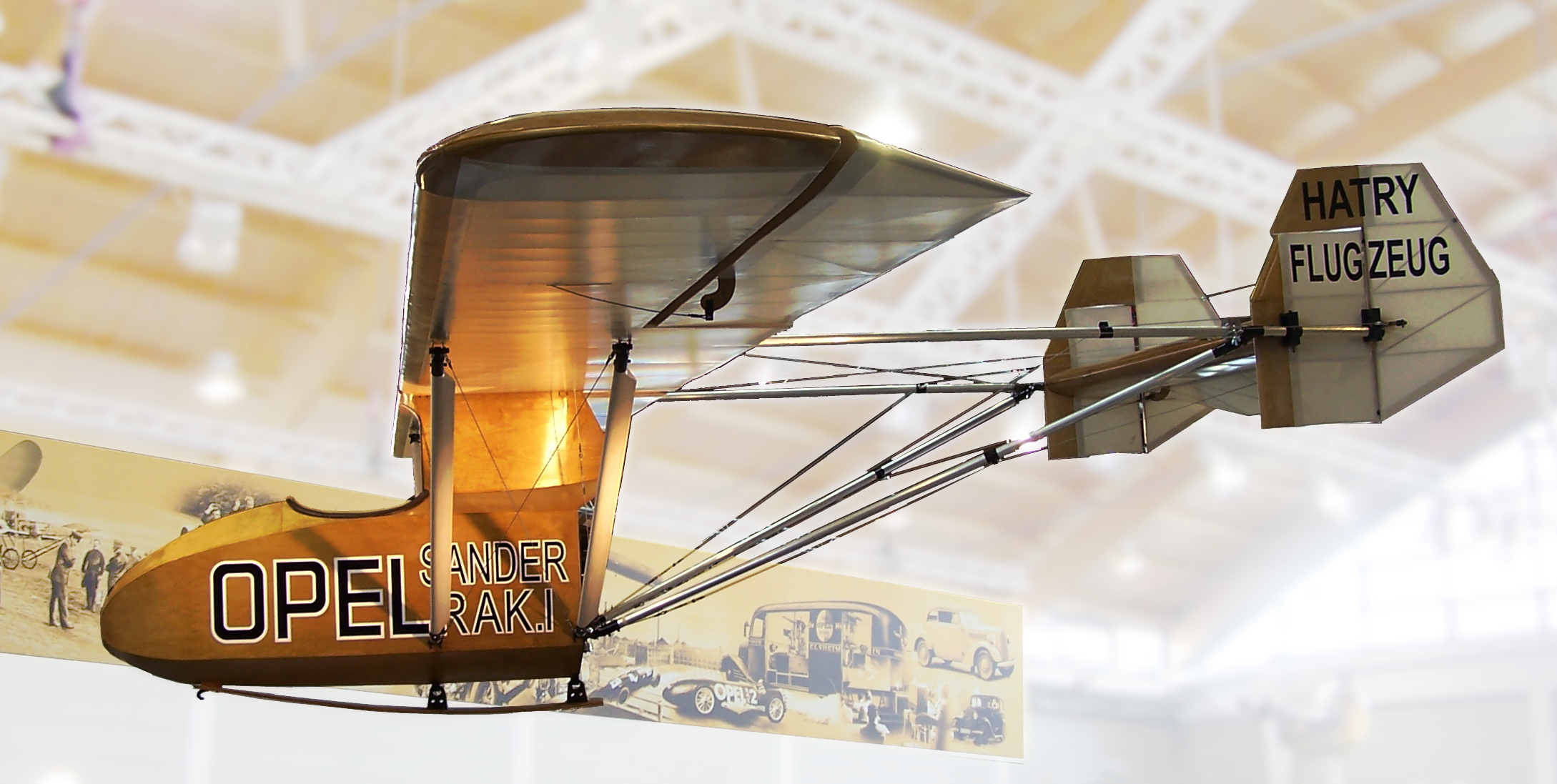
Opel RAK.1, the world's first rocket plane

The Technoseum has a replica of the world's first dedicated rocket-plane on display: Fritz von Opel on September 30, 1929 was the pilot of the world's first public manned rocket-powered flight with the Opel RAK.1, designed by Julius Hatry. The Opel-RAK program under the leadership of Fritz von Opel and Max Valier is generally considered the world's first large-scale rocket program with a strong and long-lasting impact on later space pioneers and in particular on Wernher von Braun.

=== Steam train ===
Running from end-to-end through the middle of the museum is a dual-gauge metre gauge and standard gauge railway track. On this track a fireless locomotive operates steam-haul trips outside of the museum, over a bridge and then back into the museum again.

=== Feldbahn railway ===
Since 2006, between May and October each year a Feldbahn narrow gauge trains runs in a 1.3-kilometre-long (0.8 mi) loop around the Technoseum park grounds. The track gauge is 600 millimetres (2 ft) and there are two regular small diesel locomotives. One locomotive was built in 1961 and worked mining peat in Schleswig-Holstein; the other one was built in 1964 and matches a locomotive used at the nearby Tonwaren-Industrie Wiesloch brickworks.

=== Museum ship Mannheim ===
The Mannheim is a side wheel paddle steamer that was converted into a museum ship in 1985. It housed a permanent exhibition an inland navigation and the history of steam ships. Since 2018 it was closed for the public due to a loss of operational license due to poor condition. In 2023 the "Verein Museumsschiff Mannheim e. V." (association museumship mannheim) helped to raise money for the repairs and a restoration of the ship. In June 2024 an open day was held after the repairs.

== Special exhibitions ==
The selection of visiting or temporary exhibitions have included:

- Body World (Körperwelten) (the first to appear in Europe in 1997/98)
- Jules Verne: Technology and Fiction (1999/2000)
- Mythos Turn of the Century: human beings, nature and machines in photos 1800 – 1900 – 2000 (2000/01)
- The Brain and Thinking: the cosmos in the head (2001/02)
- All the Time in the World (2002/03)
- Dance and the Banana: Trade and cultural objects (2003/04)
- E-Guitar: Electric guitars, musicians, history, culture (2004)
- Love of Cars (2004/05)
- Understanding Einstein (2005/06)
- View into the Invisible: sub-atomic particles, microsystems and parasites (2006/07)
- Space Adventure:Break out into the universe (2006/07)
- Mannheim on Wheels. Mobility from 1607 to 2007 (2007/08)
- Power music (2008)
