= Kehilla =

Kehilla or kehillah (Hebrew: קהילה) means "congregation" in Hebrew. The term may refer to:

- Kehilla (modern), the elected local communal Jewish structure in Eastern Europe (Poland's Second Republic, the Baltic States, Ukrainian People's Republic) during the interwar period (1918–1940)
- Kehillah Jewish High School, Palo Alto, California, US
- Kehilla Community Synagogue, a synagogue in Oakland, California

== See also ==
- Kahal (disambiguation), an etymologically related term
- Kehila, a village in Estonia
- Minyan, quorum of ten Jewish adults required for certain religious obligations
- Qahal, ancient Israelite organizational structure
