= Kagal (disambiguation) =

Kagal is a town in Kolhapur district of the Indian state of Maharashtra.

Kagal may also refer to:

- Kagal (Vidhan Sabha constituency)
- Qahal, a theocratic organization in ancient Israel and a Jewish self-administration council in Eastern Europe
- Kagal (Finnish resistance movement)

== See also ==
- Kahal (disambiguation)
