= Armand Jung =

French politician (1950–2019)

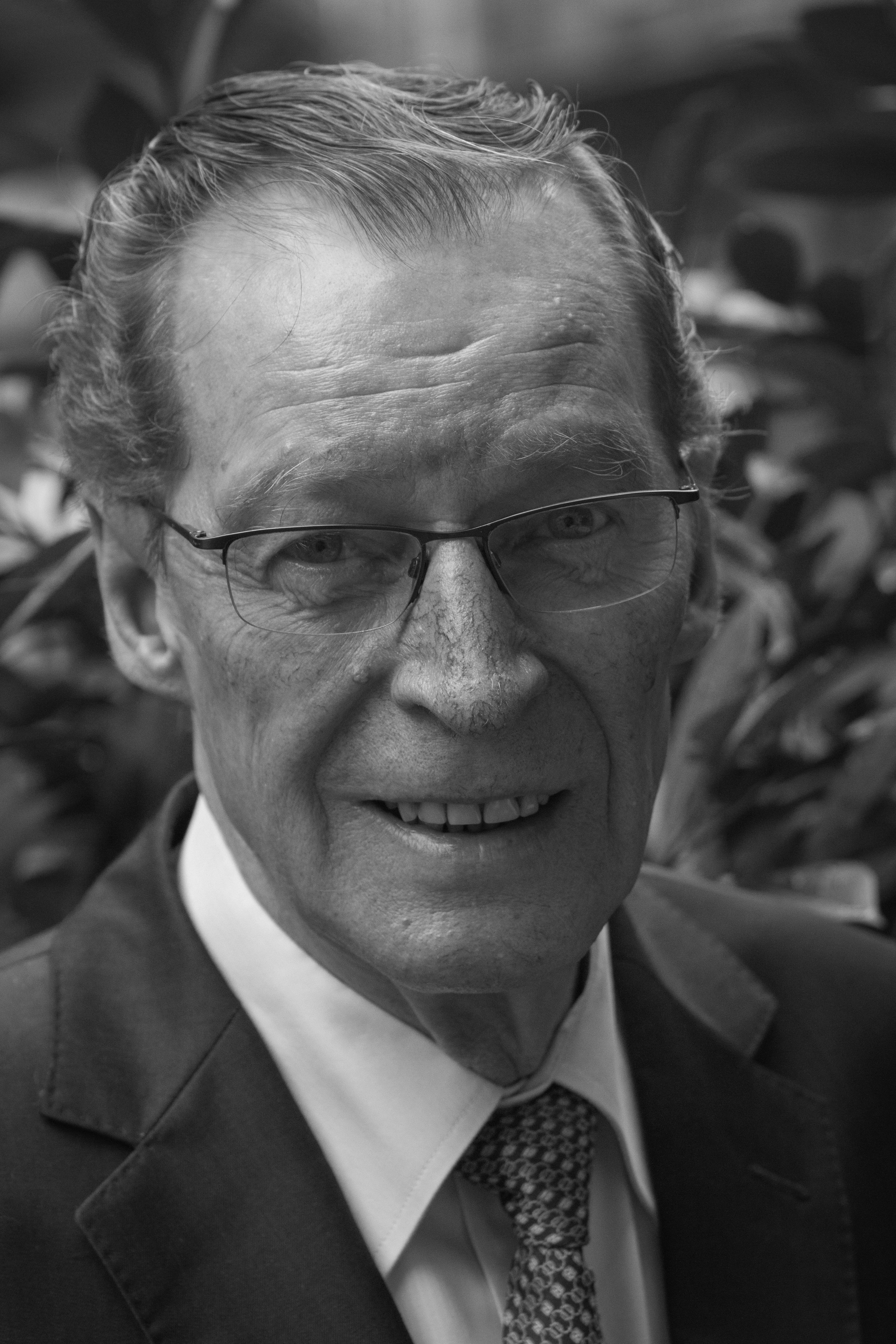

Member of the National Assembly of France
- In office 5 July 1997 – 3 March 2016
- Preceded by: Catherine Trautmann
- Succeeded by: Éric Elkouby
- Constituency: Bas-Rhin's 1st

Personal details
- Born: 13 December 1950 Théding, Moselle, France
- Died: 31 July 2019 (aged 68)
- Party: PS
- Website: http://www.armandjung-depute.fr/

Armand Jung (13 December 1950 – 31 July 2019) was a member of the National Assembly of France. He represented Bas-Rhin's 1st constituency, and was a member of the Socialiste, radical, citoyen et divers gauche.

== Honours and awards ==
Chevalier of the Order of Legion of Honour

National Assembly of France
Preceded by Catherine Trautmann	Deputy for Bas-Rhin's 1st constituency 1997–2016	Succeeded by Éric Elkouby
