= Kahal (disambiguation) =

Kahal (כָּחָל) is a town in Galilee, Israel.

Kahal may also refer to:

- Qahal (קהל), a theocratic organization in ancient Israel, and kahal, a Jewish self-administration council in Eastern Europe
- Kohol (disambiguation), an Iranian name for places and people
- Irving Kahal (1903–1942), American lyricist

== See also ==
- Kehilla (disambiguation), a term etymologically related to kahal/qahal
- Kagal (disambiguation)
