= Sandra Regol =

French politician

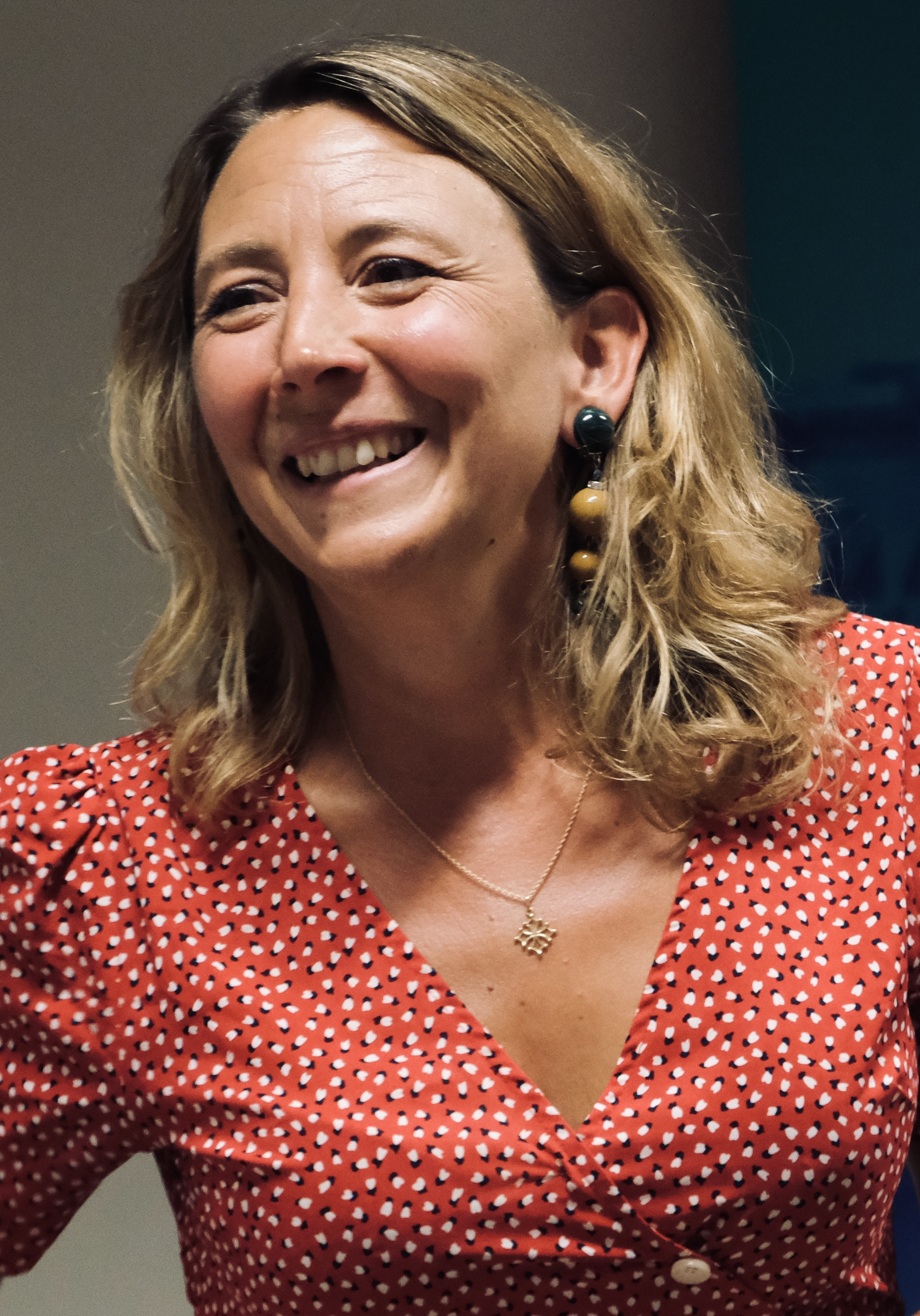
- Regol in 2023

Member of the National Assembly for Bas-Rhin's 1st constituency
- Incumbent
- Assumed office 20 June 2022
- Preceded by: Thierry Michels

Personal details
- Born: 13 April 1978 (age 48) Béziers, Hérault, France
- Party: EELV (since 2014)

Sandra Regol (born 13 April 1978) is a French politician of EELV who has been serving as Member of Parliament for Bas-Rhin's 1st constituency since the 2022 elections.

== Political career ==
In parliament, Regol has since been serving on the Committee on Legal Affairs. In addition to her committee assignments, she is part of the French delegation to the Franco-German Parliamentary Assembly.

In 2023, Regol was among the left-leaning lawmakers who challenged the government's bill allowing AI-powered cameras at the 2024 Summer Olympics in Paris before the Constitutional Council.

== See also ==
- List of deputies of the 16th National Assembly of France
