= Bas-Rhin's 1st constituency =

Constituency of the National Assembly of France

1st constituency of the Bas-Rhin
- inline Constituency of the National Assembly of France

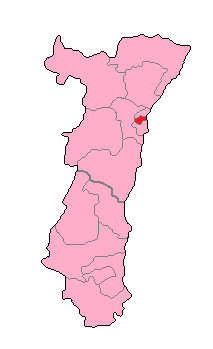
- Bas-Rhin's 1st Constituency shown within Alsace

- Bas-Rhin in France
- Deputy: Sandra Regol; EELV
- Department: Bas-Rhin
- Cantons: Strasbourg I, Strasbourg II, Strasbourg IV, Strasbourg IX
- Registered voters: 63,979

The 1st constituency of the Bas-Rhin is a French legislative constituency in the Bas-Rhin département, Alsace.

== Description ==
The constituency includes the centre and immediate northern and southern cantons of Strasbourg. All the cantons were held by parties of the left; three for the PS and one for The Greens. It is therefore no surprise that the seat returned a PS member to the National Assembly between 1997 and 2017. However, the seat was won by the centrist LREM party in 2017, before swinging back to the left in 2022, when it was gained by Sandra Regol for EELV, as part of the left-wing NUPES alliance.

== Historic representation ==
Election	Member	Party
1958	René Radius	UNR
1962	René Radius	UNR
1967	René Radius	UDR
1968	René Radius	UDR
1973	René Radius	UDR
1978	Émile Koehl	UDF
1986	Proportional representation - no election by constituency	
1988	Émile Koehl	UDF
1993	Harry Lapp	UDF
1997	Armand Jung	PS
2002	Armand Jung	PS
2007	Armand Jung	PS
2012	Armand Jung	PS
2016	Éric Elkouby	PS
2017	Thierry Michels	LREM
2022	Sandra Regol	EELV

== Election results ==
=== 2024 ===
Legislative Election 2024: Bas-Rhin's 1st constituency
Party	Candidate	Votes	%	±%
DIV	Thomas Brant	77	0.18	n/
DVE	Etienne Génieux	0	0.00	n/a
DVE	Dan Benhamou	77	0.18	n/a
DVE	Patrick Arbogast	424	0.98	n/a
DVE	Jamal Rouchdi	472	1.09	n/a
DVE	Thomas Schlund	43	0.10	n/a
DVE	Albéric Barret	315	0.73	n/a
DVG	Serge Oehler	835	1.93	n/a
Volt	Frédéric Seigle-Murandi	107	0.25	n/a
LÉ–EELV (NFP)	Sandra Regol	20,631	47.60	+9.53
LR	Irène Weiss	2,787	6.43	+1.73
LO	Louise Fève	146	0.34	n/a
RN	Hombeline du Parc	6,081	14.03	+7.48
REC	Luc Ménard	436	1.01	−2.52
RE (Ensemble)	Etienne Loos	10,513	24.26	−4.62
UL	Odette Holtzer	395	0.91	n/a
Turnout		43,339	98.94	+48.18
Registered electors		62,541		
2nd round result
LÉ–EELV	Sandra Regol	23,414	58.81	+11.21
RE	Etienne Loos	16,399	41.19	+16.93
Turnout		39,813	94.93	+44.21
Registered electors		62,563		
LÉ–EELV hold		Swing		

=== 2022 ===
Legislative Election 2022: Bas-Rhin's 1st constituency
Party	Candidate	Votes	%	±%
EELV (NUPÉS)	Sandra Regol	11,976	38.07	+1.41
LREM (Ensemble)	Alain Fontanel	9,085	28.88	+6.43
DVG	Éric Elkouby*	3,062	9.73	N/A
RN	Tamara Volokhova	2,061	6.55	+0.21
LR (UDC)	Audrey Rozenhaft	1,479	4.70	−8.21
REC	Elena Christmann	1,111	3.53	N/A
Others	N/A	2,685	-	−
Turnout		31,459	50.76	+0.96
2nd round result
EELV (NUPÉS)	Sandra Regol	15,569	51.47	+11.42
LREM (Ensemble)	Alain Fontanel	14,682	48.53	−11.42
Turnout		30,251	50.02	+9.74
EELV gain from LREM				

*Elkouby stood as the PS candidate at the previous election. As PS endorsed the NUPES candidate, Elkouby's 2017 result is counted in the swing for that candidate.

=== 2017 ===
Results of the 11 June and 18 June 2017 French National Assembly election in Bas-Rhin’s 1st Constituency
Candidate	Party		1st round		2nd round	
Candidate	Party		Votes	%	Votes	%
Thierry Michels	La République En Marche!	LREM	10,644	35.31	13,301	59.95
Éric Elkouby	Socialist Party	PS	4,190	13.90	8,885	40.05
Jean-Marie Brom	La France Insoumise	FI	4,067	13.49		
Elsa Schalck	The Republicans	LR	3,892	12.91		
Abdelkarim Ramdane	Ecologist	ECO	2,158	7.16		
Andréa Didelot	National Front	FN	1,912	6.34		
Sabine Hervault	Regionalist	REG	664	2.20		
Salah Koussa	Independent	DIV	457	1.52		
Saber Hajem	Independent	DIV	414	1.37		
Agnès Lopez	Independent	DIV	347	1.15		
Hülliya Turan	Communist Party	PCF	334	1.11		
Marie-Françoise Hamard	Independent	DIV	297	0.99		
Salomé François-Wilser	Ecologist	ECO	252	0.84		
Pascale Hirn	Independent	DIV	193	0.64		
Christophe Leprêtre	Independent	DIV	164	0.54		
Salah Keltoumi	Far Left	EXG	99	0.33		
Pacha Mobasher	Miscellaneous Left	DVG	31	0.10		
Nina Hutt	Independent	DIV	28	0.09		
Total			30,143	100%	22,186	100%
Registered voters			61,032		61,033	
Blank/Void ballots			249	0.82%	2,401	9.77%
Turnout			30,392	49.80%	24,587	40.28%
Abstentions			30,640	50.20%	36,446	59.72%
Result					LREM GAIN FROM PS	

=== 2012 ===
Results of the 10 June and 17 June 2012 French National Assembly election in Bas-Rhin’s 1st Constituency
Candidate	Party		1st round		2nd round	
Candidate	Party		Votes	%	Votes	%
Armand Jung	Socialist Party	PS	13,830	41.89	18,926	61.61
Anne Hulne	Union for a Popular Movement	UMP	9,256	28.03	11,792	38.39
Marie-Christine Aubert	National Front	FN	3,103	9.40		
Josiane Nervi-Gasparini	Left Front	FG	2,326	7.04		
Sandra Regol	Europe Ecology - The Greens	EELV	2,188	6.63		
Jean-Marcel Brule	The Centre for France	CEN	1,094	3.31		
Maurice Hoffmann	Other	AUT	419	1.27		
Camille Abgrall	Ecologist	ECO	316	0.96		
Sophie Coudray	Far Left	EXG	183	0.55		
Arthur Hanon	Other	AUT	105	0.32		
Norbert Dumas	Other	AUT	99	0.30		
Pierrette Morinaud	Far Left	EXG	98	0.30		
Total			33,017	100%	30,718	100%
Registered voters			63,978		63,979	
Blank/Void ballots			280	0.44%	721	2.29%
Turnout			33,297	52.04%	31,439	49.14%
Abstentions			30,681	47.96%	32,540	50.86%
Result					PS HOLD	

=== 2007 ===
Results of the 10 June and 17 June 2007 French National Assembly election in Bas-Rhin’s 1st Constituency
Candidate	Party		1st round		2nd round	
Candidate	Party		Votes	%	Votes	%
Armand Jung	Socialist Party	PS	9,718	32.96	15,994	56.27
Frédérique Loutrel	Union for a Popular Movement	UMP	9,191	31.17	12,428	43.73
Chantal Cutajar	UDF-Democratic Movement	UDF-MoDem	3,461	11.74		
Martine Calderoli-Lotz	Miscellaneous Right	DVD	2,489	8.44		
Laurent Fritz	The Greens	LV	1,426	4.84		
Bernadette Brenner	National Front	FN	939	3.18		
Antonio Gomez	Far Left	EXG	673	2.28		
Françoise Werckmann	Ecologist	ECO	416	1.41		
Christian Grosse	Communist Party	PCF	345	1.17		
Sonia J. Fath	Independent	DIV	214	0.73		
Jean-Luc Schaffhauser	Miscellaneous Right	DVD	190	0.64		
Jacques Barthel	Independent	DIV	157	0.53		
Pierrette Morinaud	Far Left	EXG	140	0.47		
Stéphanie Brasseur	Far Right	EXD	125	0.42		
Total			29,484	100%	28,422	100%
Registered voters			52,670		52,672	
Blank/Void ballots			255	0.86%	542	1.87%
Turnout			29,739	56.46%	28,964	54.99%
Abstentions			22,931	43.54%	23,708	45.01%
Result					PS HOLD	

=== 2002 ===
Results of the 9 June and 16 June 2002 French National Assembly election in Bas-Rhin’s 1st Constituency
Candidate	Party		1st round		2nd round	
Candidate	Party		Votes	%	Votes	%
Robert Grossmann	Union for a Presidential Majority	UMP	11,492	37.30	14,060	49.79
Armand Jung	Socialist Party	PS	10,333	33.54	14,181	50.21
Genevieve Auvray	National Front	FN	2,193	7.12		
Laurent Fritz	The Greens	LV	1,221	3.96		
Patrick Beaufrere	Union for French Democracy	UDF	1,078	3.50		
M. Laurence Forrer	Miscellaneous Right	DVD	943	3.06		
Luc Gwiazdzinski	Miscellaneous Left	DVG	739	2.40		
Jacques Cordonnier	Far Right	EXD	616	2.00		
Frederique Riedlin	Revolutionary Communist League	LCR	379	1.23		
Christine Kling-Moreau	Republican Pole	PR	318	1.03		
J. Louis Amann	Ecologist	ECO	317	1.03		
Remy J. Paul Probst	Miscellaneous Right	DVD	297	0.96		
Christian Grosse	Communist Party	PCF	274	0.89		
Hubert Whitechurch	Far Left	EXG	204	0.66		
Jean Paillot	Movement for France	MPF	202	0.66		
Pierrette Morinaud	Workers’ Struggle	LO	155	0.50		
Bernard Prigent	Independent	DIV	50	0.16		
Total			30,811	100%	28,241	100%
Registered voters			49,330		49,330	
Blank/Void ballots			288	0.93%	675	2.33%
Turnout			31,099	63.04%	28,916	58.62%
Abstentions			18,231	36.96%	20,414	41.38%
Result					PS HOLD	

== Sources ==
Official results of French elections from 2002: "Résultats électoraux officiels en France" (in French).
