= Mainz (1929 ship) =

Paddle steamer

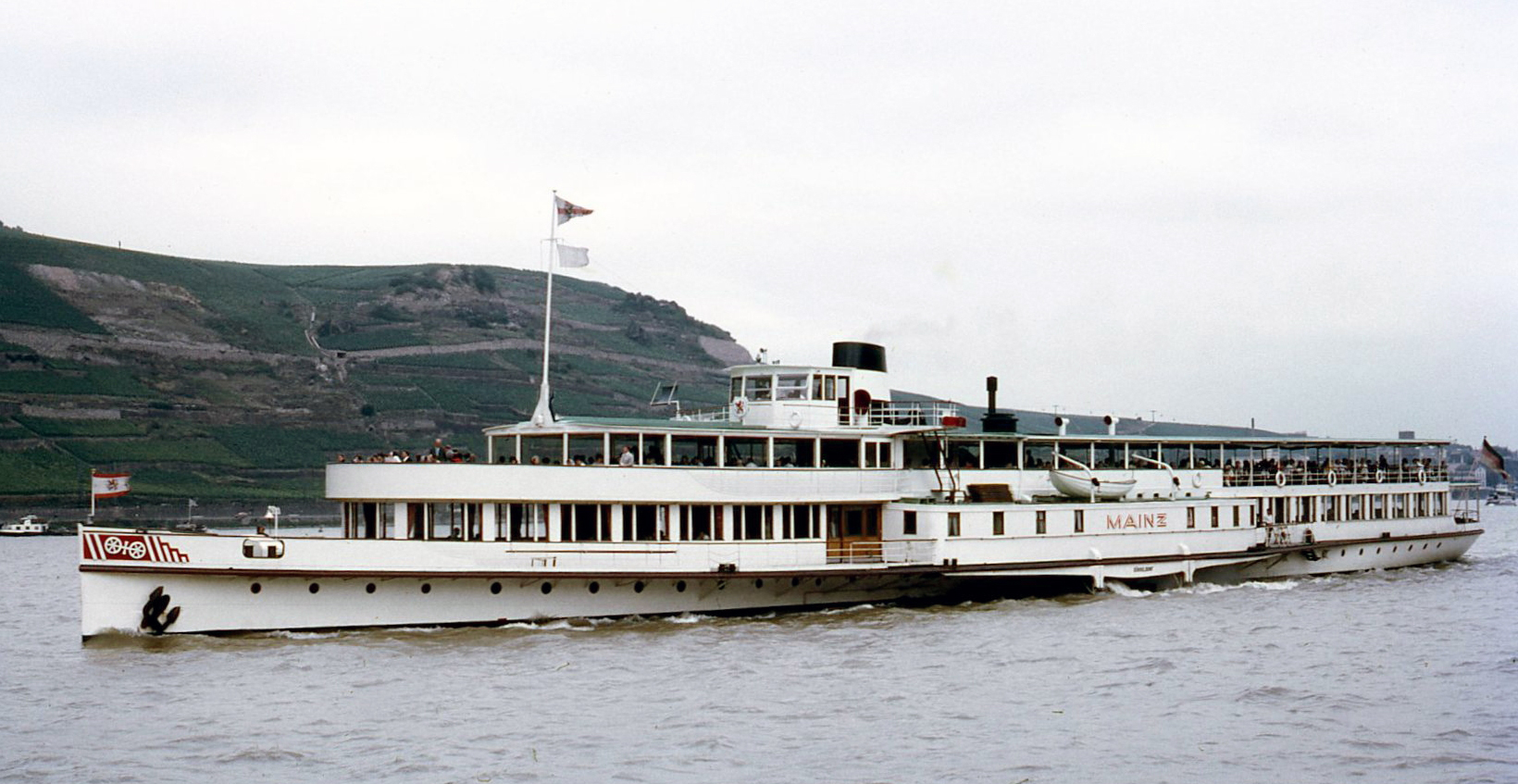
- The Mainz in August 1970 at Rüdesheim am Rhein in the valley

History
- Name: Mainz
- Way number: until 1981: Europe No.: 4200360
- Launched: January 17, 1928
- Completed: June 4, 1929

General characteristics
- Type: Paddle steamer
- Length: 83.62 m (274 ft 4 in)
- Depth: 8.70 m (28 ft 7 in) above wheel arches; 16.20 m (53 ft 2 in)
- Propulsion: 2-cylinder hot steam composite machine
- Crew: 1790

Mainz is a side-wheel paddle steamer for the Lower and Middle Rhine built in 1928/1929 for the Steamship Company for the Lower and Middle Rhine (DGNM), which was used by the Cologne-Düsseldorfer German Rhine Shipping in scheduled service on the Rhine. She was the thousandth ship completed by the shipyard Christof Ruthof and also the last paddle steamer built for the Köln-Düsseldorfer. The Mainz survived World War II as the only ship of the shipping company that was able to sail, but was then so badly damaged in an accident on June 12, 1956 that the hull had to be rebuilt. Due to the high need for repair and refurbishment, the Köln-Düsseldorfer decommissioned the passenger ship after the 1980 summer season.

After the donation to the Gesellschaft zur Förderung des Deutschen Rheinschiffahrtsmuseum Mannheim, the excursion steamer was converted into an exhibition ship. Since October 17, 1985, it has been firmly anchored as the Museum Ship Mannheim below the Electoral Palatinate Bridge on the Neckar. It houses a permanent exhibition of the Technoseum on the history of inland navigation.

== Technical description ==
=== Hull, decks and equipment ===
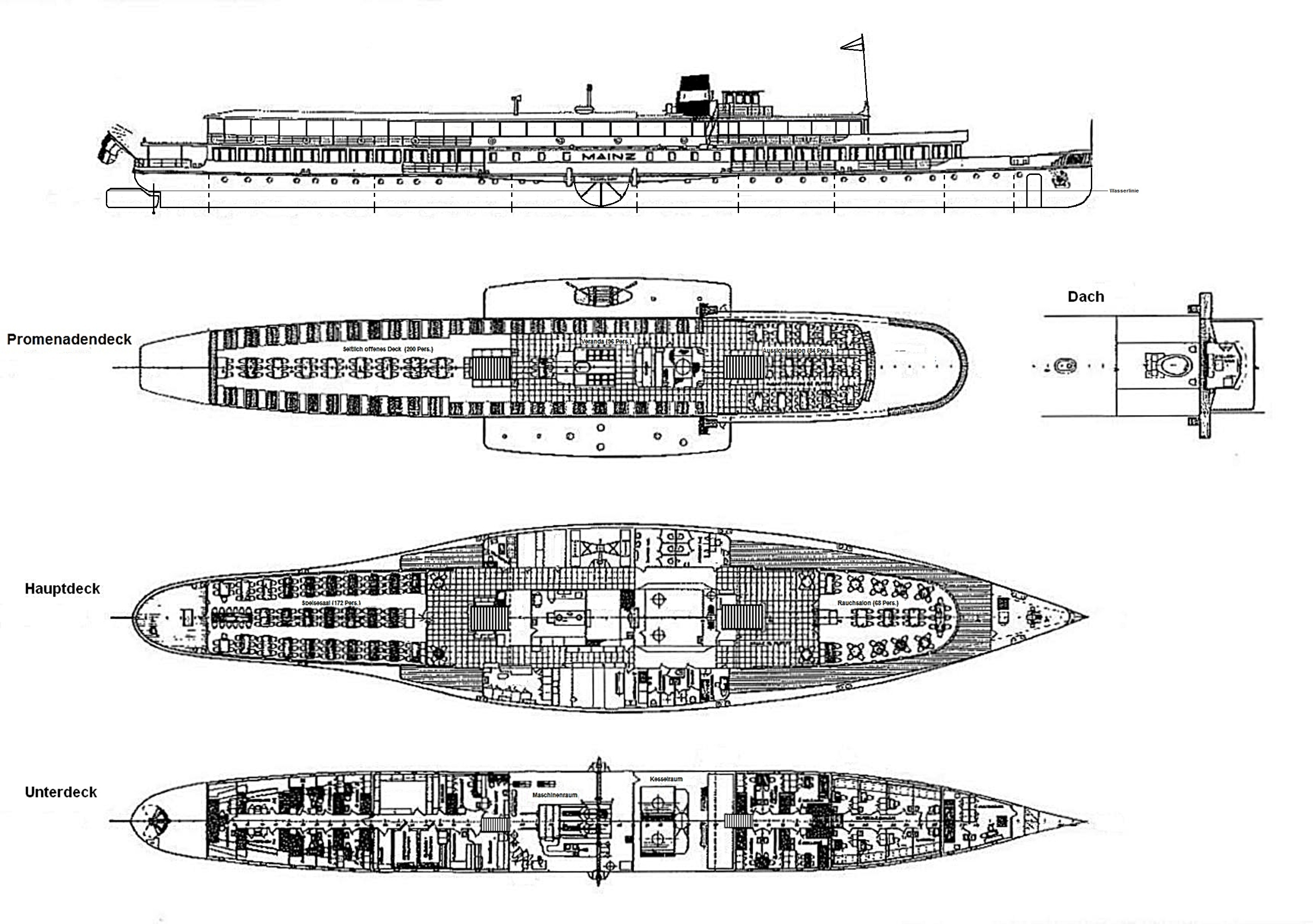
Deck plan of the Mainz from 1957

The Mainz was designed as a monohull ship with a tapered bow, straight steamer stem and a cruiser stern. The hull consists of riveted steel plates on frames. The ship has two fixed decks and a protective deck completely covered with wood. After the accident in 1956, the front half of the deck was given a fixed covering, which was glazed on the bow side for wind protection. The length between the stems is 80.50 m (264 ft 1 in), the overall length is given as 83.62 m (274 ft 4 in). The width on frames is 8.70 m (28 ft 7 in), the width over the wheel arches is 16.20 m (53 ft 2 in).

In the lower deck, which was equipped with eight transverse bulkheads for safety, the crew cabins and six rest cabins for passengers were located in the forward area during her active service. The two steam boilers and the steam engine were located in the middle of the ship, with further crew cabins and storage rooms behind them. On the main deck, an open deck was set up in the bow area, which was adjoined by a smoking saloon with 68 seats. In the wheelhouse on the port side there was a hairdressing salon, the passenger toilets, the checkroom, a luggage room and the inspector's office; in the starboard wheelhouse there was another crew cabin, the staff toilets, the ship's galley and two sculleries; large entrance areas in front of and behind the wheelhouses were each equipped with 16 seats. In the aft area was the steamer's dining room with seating for 172 guests. A covered open deck was installed aft. The viewing saloon, located on the protective deck in the forward half of the ship, was designed for 84 people and had an all-round paneled outdoor area. From the veranda in the midship, which was designed for 96 people, the operating steam engine could be viewed via an open shaft. The covered rear area of the deck offered space for 200 passengers, was open at the sides and secured with a railing.

=== Drive and control ===
The Mainz was powered by an inclined two-cylinder compound steam engine with valve control from Maschinenfabrik Christof Ruthof with an output of 900 horsepower (670 kW) via two 3.80 m (12 ft 6 in) high paddle wheels controlled by push rods and eccentrics, each with eight paddles. It had two double-flame tube cylinder boiler, which had been manufactured by Deutsche Babcock & Wilcox Dampfkessel-Werke in Oberhausen. With a total of 291 m^{2} (3,130 sq ft) heating surface, they generated a steam pressure of 12.5 kp/cm^{2} (790 N/sq in). With a bunker capacity of 33 tons, coal consumption averaged 590 kilograms (1,300 lb) per hour. Since the conversion of the boiler system, heavy fuel oil was used as fuel. The ship was steered by a steam-powered rudder engine with a 4.46 m (14 ft 8 in) long single-surface rudder. The steamer reached an average speed of 18 kilometres per hour (11 mph) during scheduled uphill journey and 23 km/h (14 mph) during downhill journey. With a maximum speed of 22 km/h (14 mph) when traveling uphill, the Mainz was the fastest passenger ship on the Rhine until the hydrofoil Rheinpfeil went into service.

== History ==
=== Planning, construction and commissioning ===
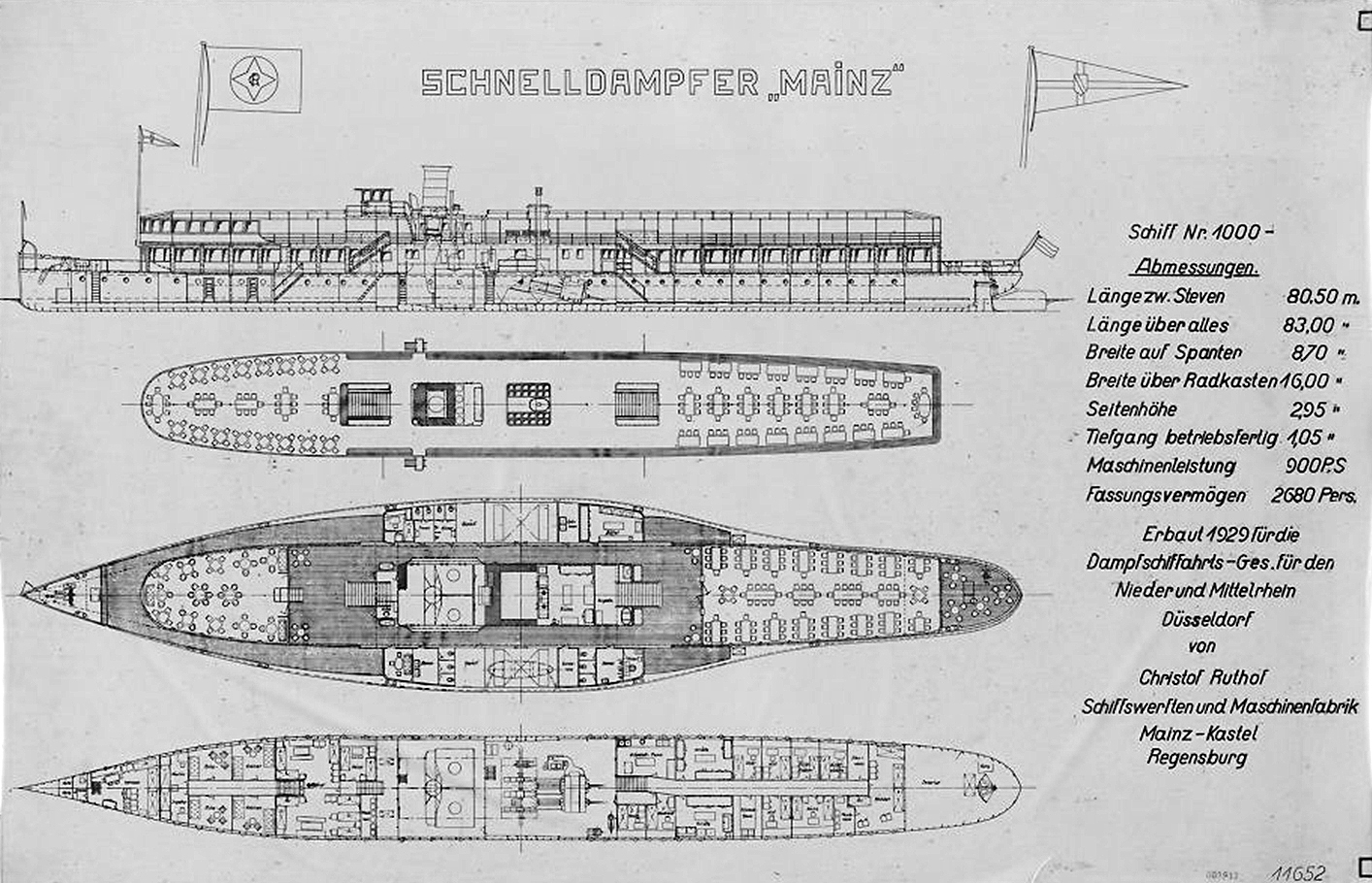
General plan from 1929

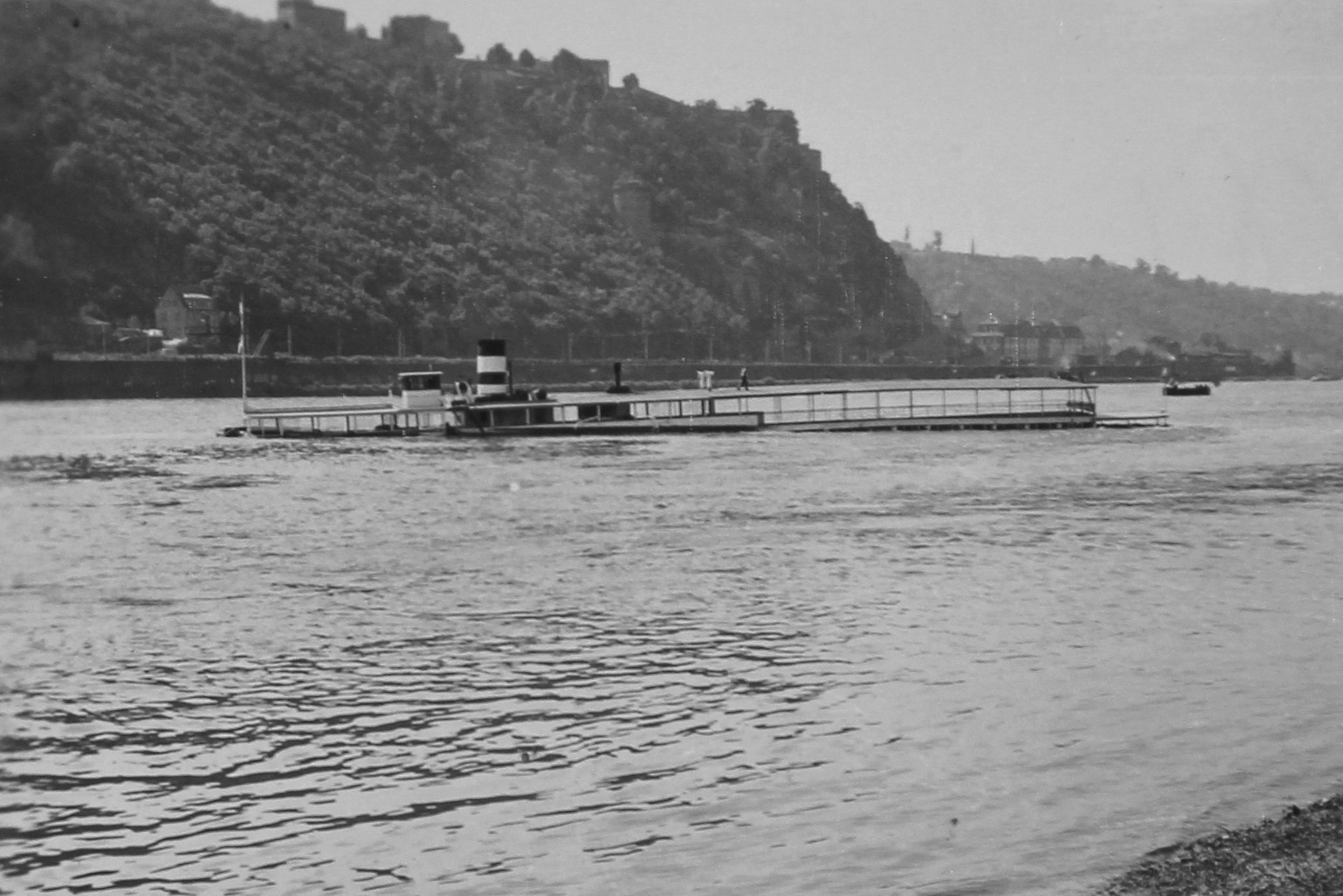
The Mainz after the accident in June 1956

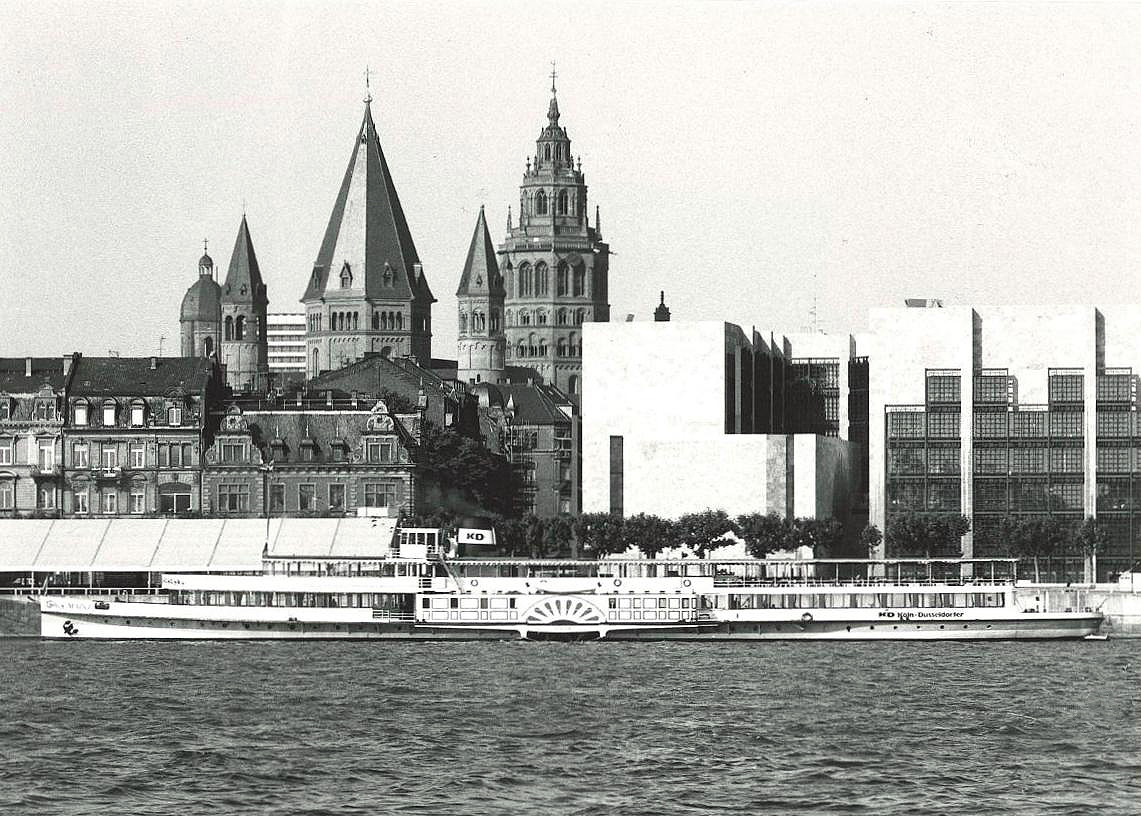
The Mainz in Mainz

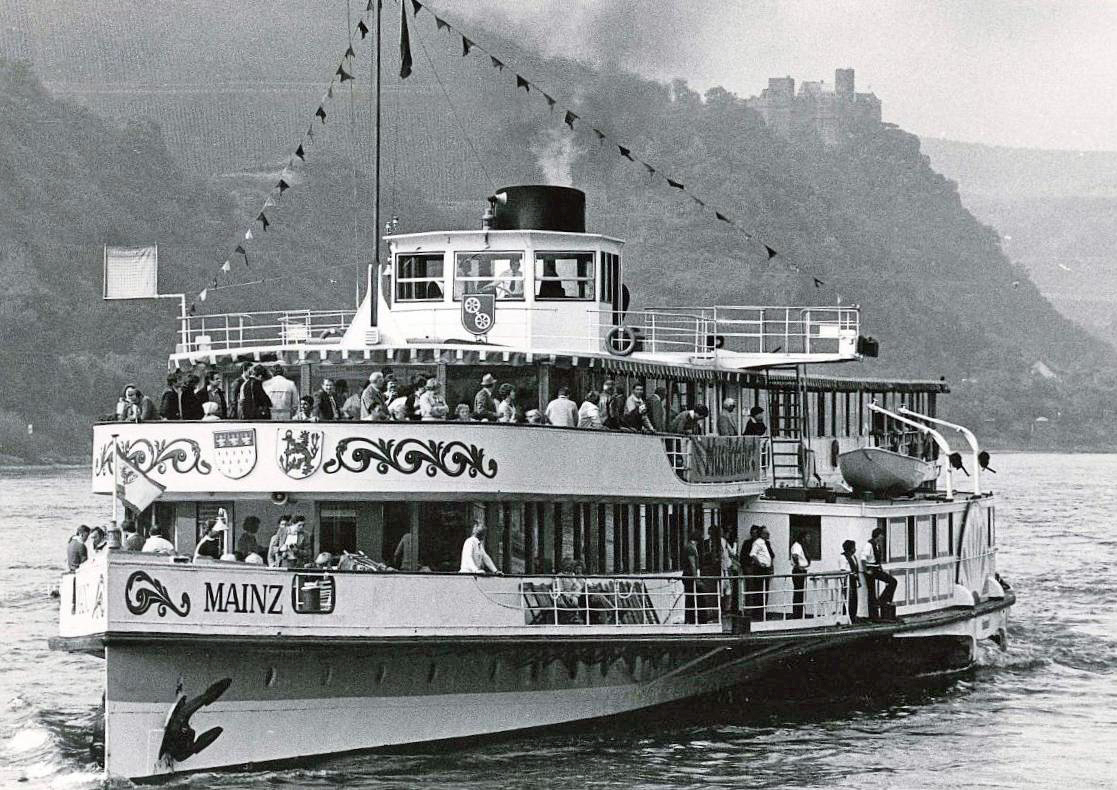
"Music cruise" on the Rhine in the 1970s.

On January 17, 1928, the DGNM ordered a passenger ship from the Ruthof shipyard that was to be suitable for high-speed travel on the Rhine thanks to its hull shape and the optimization of the paddle wheels. A series of tests with model ships was therefore carried out at the Hamburg Shipbuilding Research Institute. After completion of the tests, the first ship parts were manufactured from July 2, 1928. The keel laying took place on October 10, the launching on March 19 of the following year. As defects were discovered during the first sea trial on May 4, the planned date for the maiden voyage had to be postponed from May 19 to June 4, 1929 due to the need for reworking. In the presence of around 200 guests of honor, the Lord Mayor Karl Külb and the Chairman of the Chamber of Commerce Christian Scholz held the ceremonial speeches on the banks of the Rhine in Mainz. They were the spokespersons for the christening sponsors - the city of Mainz and the Chamber of Industry and Commerce for Rheinhessen. The subsequent nine-hour maiden voyage, which was carried out as an express trip, ended in Cologne. From the following day, the Mainz was used in scheduled service on the same route. The coal-fired steamship could carry up to 2680 passengers.

=== World War II and post-war period ===
The Mainz was one of the twelve ships of the shipping company that were decommissioned with the outbreak of World War II. The side-wheel steamer lay in the ports of Krefeld, Düsseldorf and Oberwinter from September 1939 to January 1943. In 1941, a blue-grey camouflage coat was applied. After repairs to the moving parts and the steam boilers at the Cologne shipyard, the ship was used for passenger and freight transport as well as for evacuation trips in the summer months of 1943 and 1944. In winter, it was parked in Rüdesheim and Oberwesel. The Reichsbahndirektion Mainz rented the ship from November 1944 and used it as a residential ship in Gernsheim. On February 23, 1945, the Mainz was transferred to the Altrhein near Erfelden. At the end of the war, the Mainz was the only one of the shipping company's 22 ships that had survived the war in running order. The 328 bullet holes caused by machine gun fire from low-flying aircraft were provisionally repaired by KD personnel by September 1945. After clearance by the American authorities, the ship was able to sail under its own power to the Rheinauhafen in Cologne on February 21, 1946. There, the camouflage paint was removed and further maintenance work was carried out. After completion, the American Allies confiscated the ship on March 31, 1946 and transferred it to Assmannshausen. The Tour Center Assmannshausen operated recreational trips for soldiers of the US Army with the ship three times a week. After the Tour Center was dissolved in November, the Köln-Düsseldorfer was able to dispose of the ship again. In the port of Düsseldorf it was converted into a hotelship with 20 double cabins. It was used as a hotel ship in the winter of 1946/47 and between July 1947 and spring 1948 in Düsseldorf's Berger Hafen. In the spring months, it was again used for recreational trips under a charter contract for the Assmannshausen Rest Center. From August 28, 1948, Köln-Düsseldorfer used the ship five times a week for excursions. After the remaining war damage had been repaired in the winter of 1948/1949, the Mainz was able to be used again from April 14, 1949 for express trips between Cologne and Mainz. Ownership was transferred back to the DGNM at this time.

=== 1950s and 1960s ===
The ship was completely modernized during shipyard visits during the winter break from 1950 to 1955. Among other things, the lower deck was given a different layout for the utility rooms and staff cabins; a wooden roof with fixed side walls up to the wheel arches was also installed on the upper deck instead of the previous awnings. At the end of the work, the steam engine was converted from coal to oil firing at the beginning of 1956.

At noon on June 12, 1956, during a turning maneuver of the Mainz near the Koblenzer Pegelhaus, there was a collision with the 800 t freight motor vessel Elise, which was sailing uphill and was steered by an 18-year-old sailor without a Rhine boatman's license. The passenger ship was severely damaged on the port side behind the wheelhouse. Shortly after the captain reached the shallow bank in Koblenz-Neuendorf at Rhine kilometer 592.5, which he had intended to evacuate, the ship sank due to the heavy water ingress. The 91 passengers and 40 crew members were picked up by smaller boats and the water police. Due to the strong current of the flooding Rhine, the anchor chains broke and the Mainz turned with its bow towards the middle of the river. The hull broke through just behind the wheel arches. Only the superstructures on the upper decks were still holding the hull together. With the help of the lifting jacks Kondor, Arend, Titan and Cyclop, the stricken vessel was raised on June 28. Still hanging in the hawser, the hull was provisionally repaired and then anchored near the shore. On July 4, the unmaneuverable shipwreck was towed to the Cologne shipyard for repairs. The salvage costs amounted to 750,000 DM. During the almost one-year stay at the shipyard due to the accident, the ship was once again completely refitted, and a new rowing chair and a contemporary funnel were installed. The repair and conversion costs amounted to 1,000,000 DM. The number of passengers was reduced to 1600 during the official inspection by the Cologne Ship Inspection Commission. After the 1963 summer season, the newly built passenger ship Loreley took over the express service on the Cologne-Mainz route. The Mainz was used for scheduled services and excursions. In 1965, the permitted number of passengers was increased to 1790. On May 16, 1967, the "DGMN" and the "Preußisch-Rheinische Dampfschiffahrtsgesellschaft" merged to form the "Köln-Düsseldorfer Deutsche Rheinschiffahrt AG". The ownership of all ships of the two companies was transferred to the new company.

=== From 1970 until decommissioning ===
On September 4, 1970, the captain attempted to dock the Mainz while sailing downstream in heavy squalls. On the second attempt, both the engine telegraph and the rudder system failed, so that the ship first rammed the KD jetty bridge and then hit the jetty of the Bingen-Rüdesheim ferry. A quay wall finally slowed the ship down. The port side of the wheelhouse and the stern roof were severely damaged. The two mooring bridges were torn away from the bank and sank in the Rhine. After emergency repairs in her shipyard, the Mainz was ready to sail again. All the damage was repaired in the spring of 1971 at the Dutch Ijssel shipyard in the Netherlands. From 1973 onwards, the ship required a great deal of refurbishment due to its age, which led to several visits to the shipyard each year. In particular, the dilapidated ship's floor, the engine, the boilers and the steering gear had to be repaired several times.

When there was again a great need for repairs after the 1980 summer season, the management of Köln-Düsseldorfer decided not to use the paddle steamer, which could no longer be operated economically, in the following year. The last scheduled service was an evening trip on the Koblenz-Boppard-Koblenz route on September 27, 1980. The next day, the Mainz sailed without passengers to the Port of Cologne-Niehl, where it was decommissioned with immediate effect and taken out of service in October 1981. Until 1985, she lay without further use in harbor basin 4a - the so-called "KD harbor". In July 1985, the shipping company concluded a donation agreement with the Gesellschaft zur Förderung des Deutschen Rheinschiffahrtsmuseum Mannheim. The new owner had the passenger ship transferred to Speyer on August 31, 1985 in a coupled convoy from the motor cargo ship Haniel 62 for conversion.

== Museum ship Mannheim ==
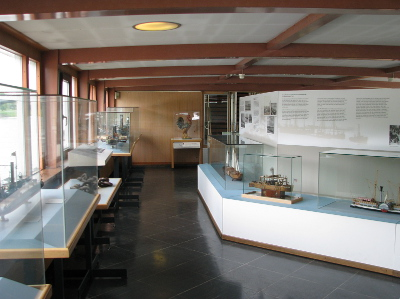
Permanent exhibition in the museum ship

The hull was refurbished and preserved at the Josef Braun shipyard in 1985. The ship was fitted with a heating system independent of the steam boilers and a closed sewage system. The interior was then converted for future use as an exhibition ship. The steam engine and the paddlewheels were made common so that they could be driven by an electric motor and used for demonstration purposes. The renovation and conversion costs amounted to 1,400,000 DM. On October 2, the ship, renamed the Museum Ship Mannheim, was transferred to the berth below the Electoral Palatinate Bridge on the Neckar in Mannheim. On October 17, 1986, the Förderverein handed over the completed ship to the Landesmuseum für Technik und Arbeit in Mannheim (since 2009 Technoseum) in a festive ceremony. In the two exhibition rooms on the main deck, visitors are informed about the history of inland navigation with many ship models. The museum has set up several experimental stations for children to explore the natural environment of the Neckar. A restaurant and an event area were set up on the upper deck.

The ship has been out of service since December 31, 2019, as the "TÜV" and the berthing permit from the city of Mannheim have expired. There is a risk that the last large Rhine steamer will be scrapped.

On July 10/11, 2023, the ship was transferred to the Cologne-Deutz shipyard. The aim is to technically overhaul the museum ship and give it a new coat of paint so that it can be reopened in Mannheim in the fall after the interior has been renovated.

In June 2024 it was reopened to the public for an open day while interior renovations are still to be completed.

Pictures of the museum ship Mannheim

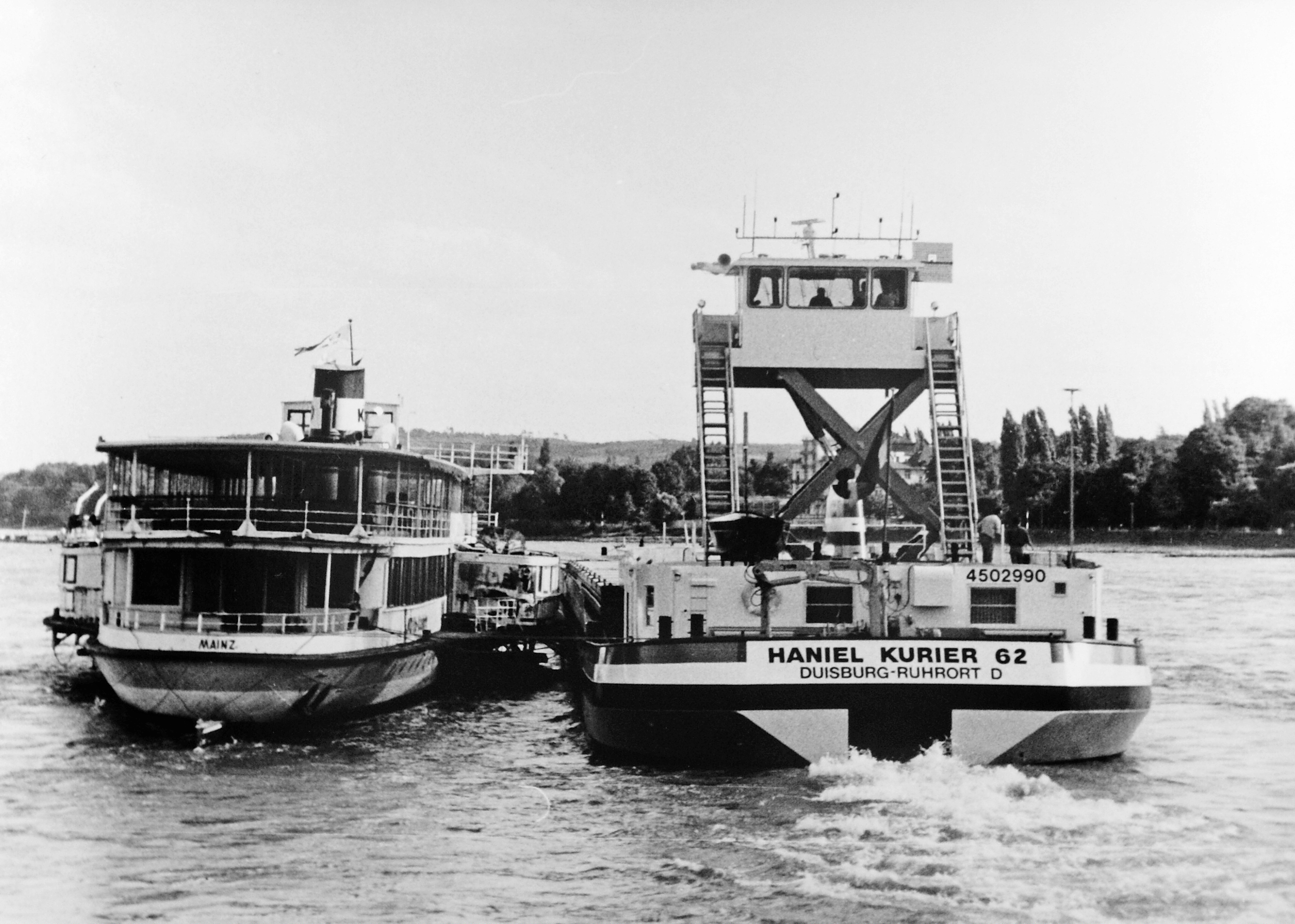
Transfer trip to Speyer, August 31, 1985

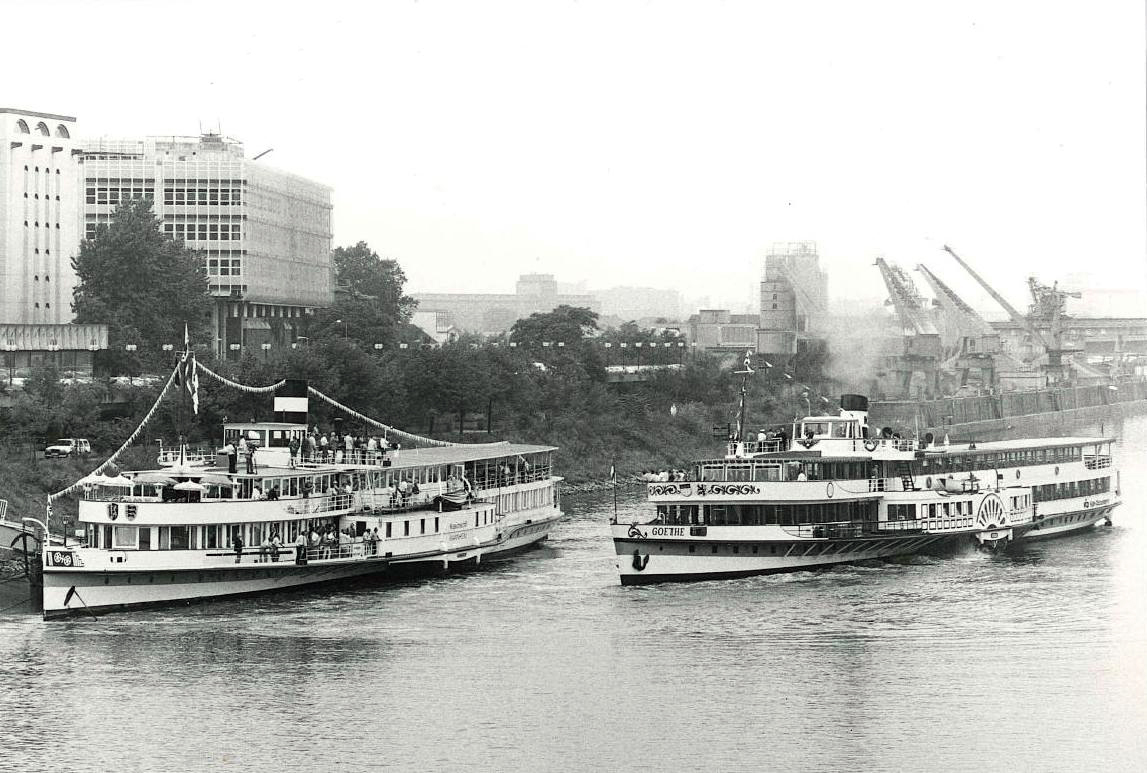
Visit to the paddle steamer Goethe, August 8, 1989

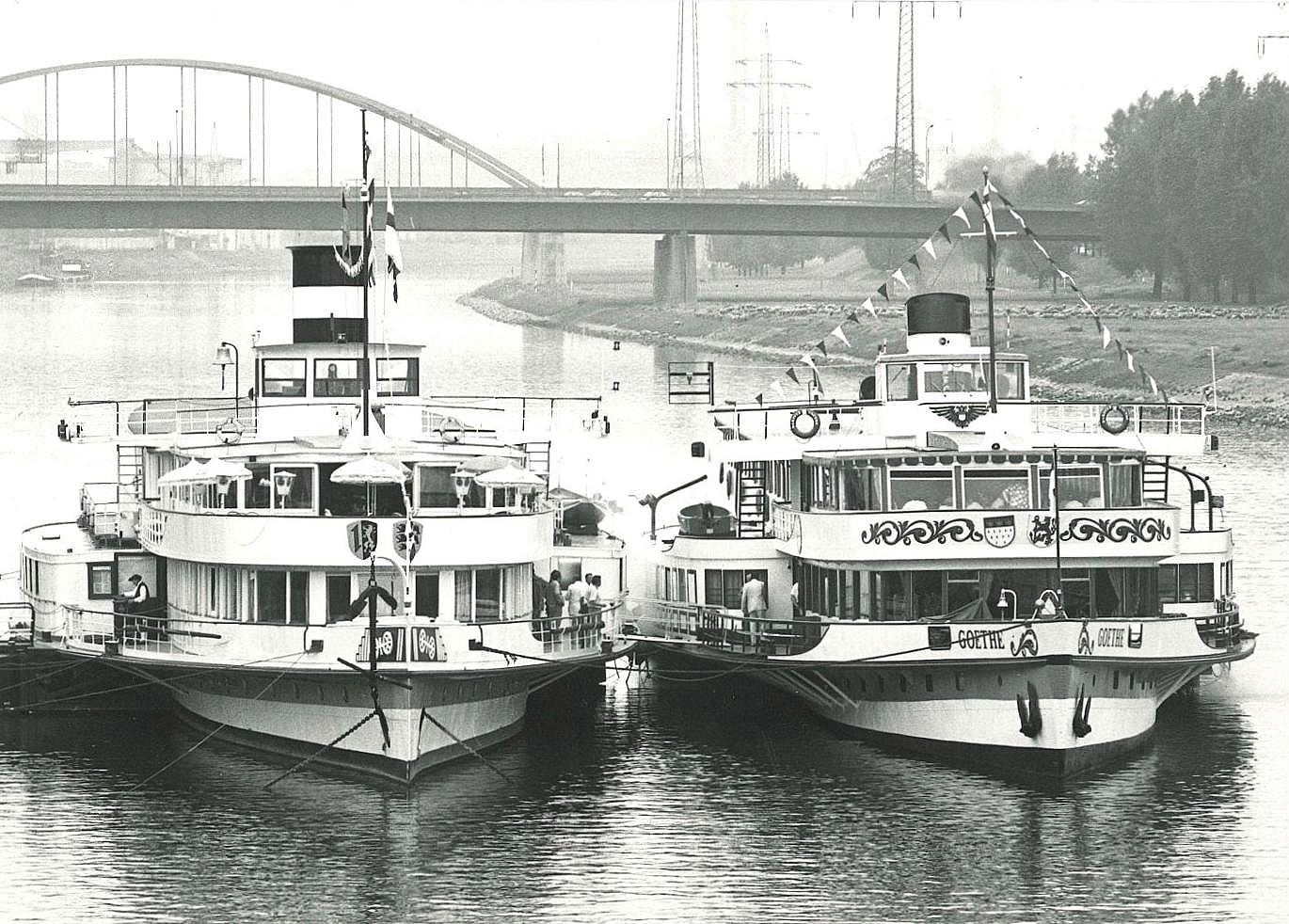
Visit to the paddle steamer Goethe, August 8, 1989

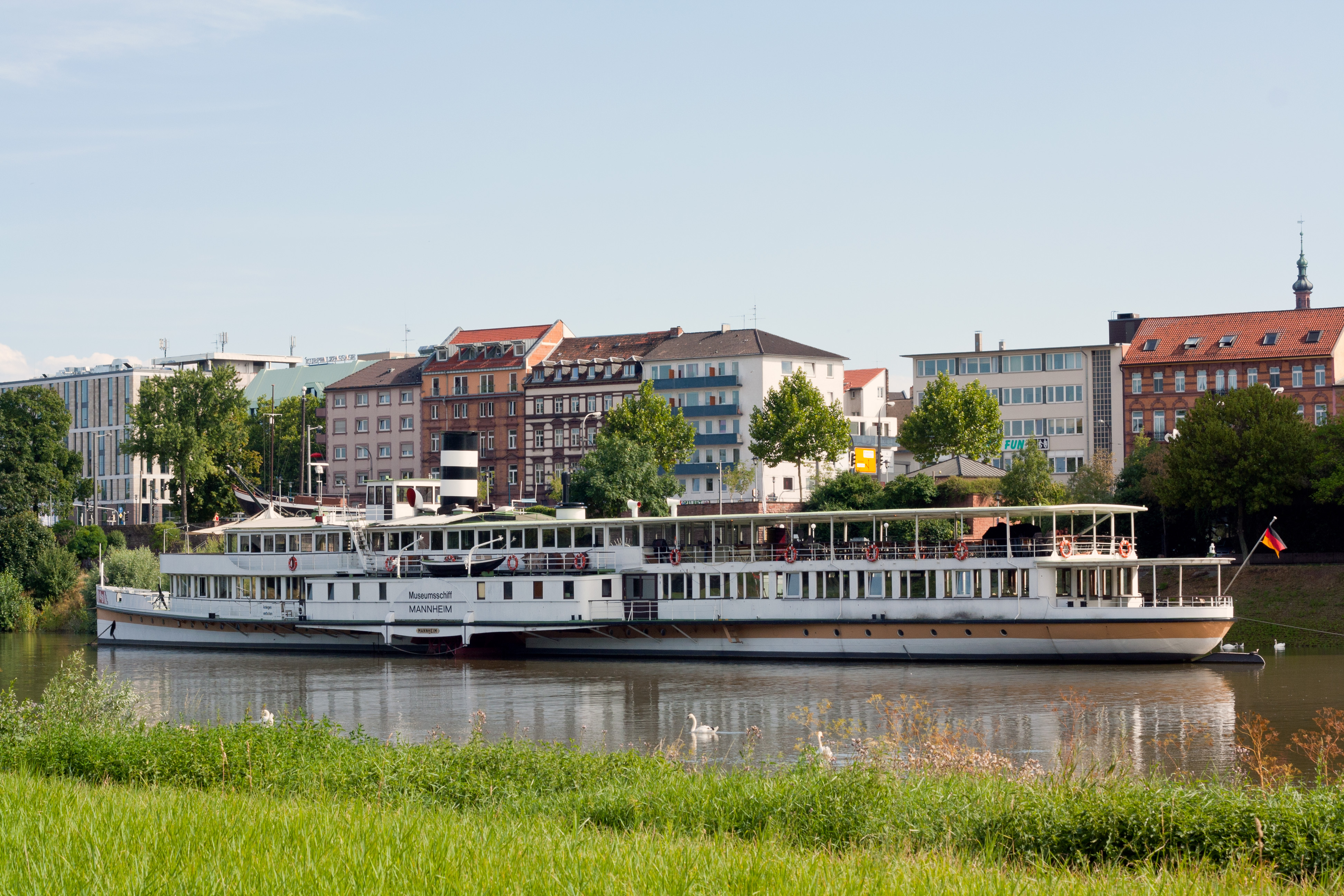
Side view from behind, 2010

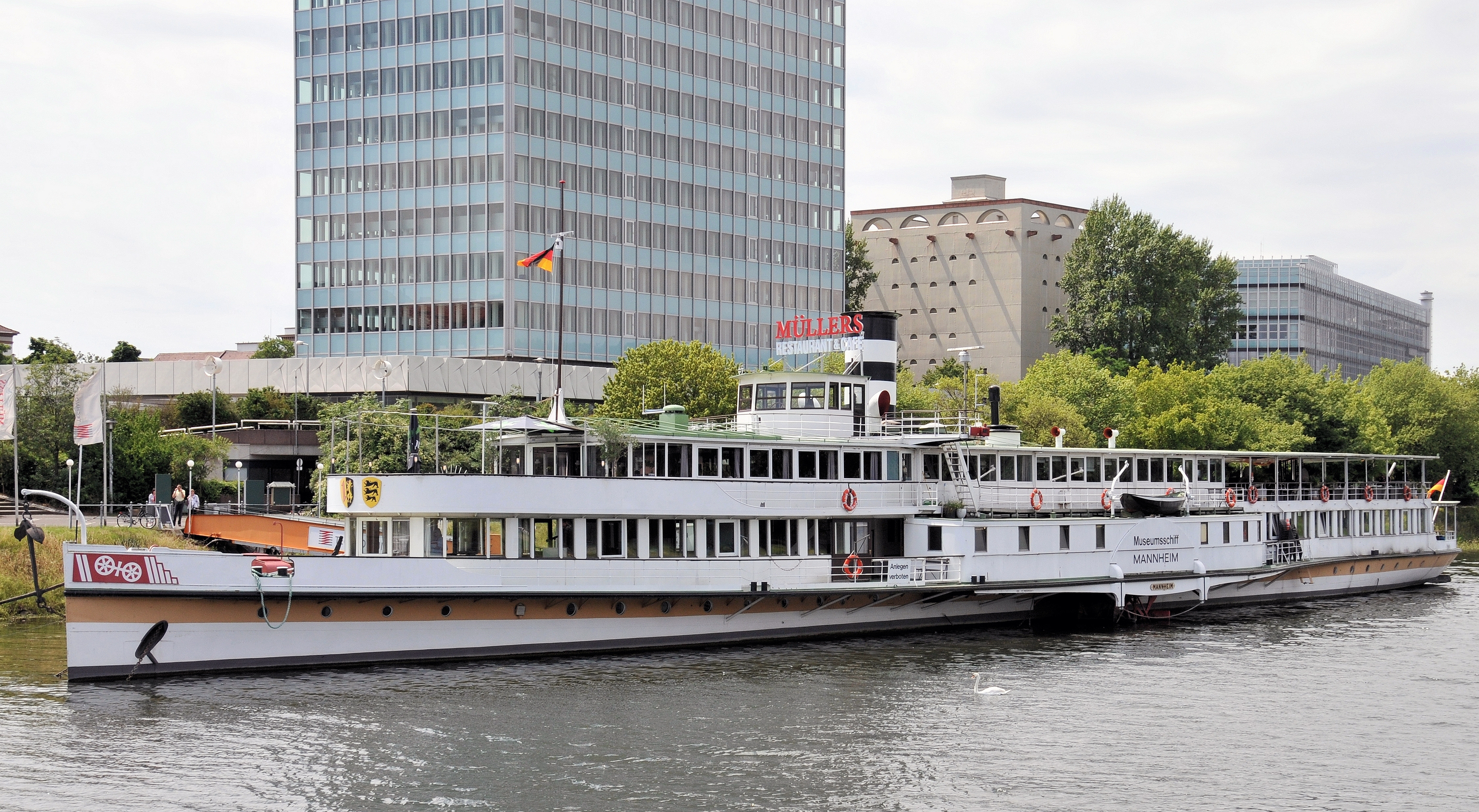
Side view from the front, 2011

== Literature ==
- Georg Fischbach: Die Schiffe der Köln-Düsseldorfer 1826–2004, Eigenverlag, Marienhausen 2004, ISBN 3-00-016046-9.
- A.F. Napp-Zinn: 100 Jahre Köln-Düsseldorfer Rheindampfschiffahrt insbesondere Zerstörung und Wiederaufbau 1939–1953, M. DuMont Schauberg, Köln 1953.
- Stephan Nuding: 175 Jahre Köln-Düsseldorfer Deutsche Rheinschiffahrt AG , Schardt Oldenburg 2001, ISBN 978-3-89841-035-9.
- Armin A. Hummel: Die Ruthof-Werft Mainz-Kastel und Regensburg, 1871–1975. Edition Winterwork Borsdorf 2018, ISBN 978-3-96014-456-4.
