= Émile Koehl =

French politician (1921–2013)

Member of the French National Assembly
- In office 19 March 1978 – 1 April 1993
- Preceded by: René Radius
- Succeeded by: Harry Lapp
- Constituency: Bas-Rhin's 1st

Personal details
- Born: 8 March 1921 Strasbourg, Alsace, France
- Died: 6 January 2013 (aged 91) Strasbourg, Alsace, France
- Party: Union for French Democracy
- Profession: General Manager

Émile Koehl (8 March 1921 – 6 January 2013) was a French politician and deputy of the French National Assembly 1978–1993, representing centre-right Union for French Democracy for the Bas-Rhin's 1st, Alsace, who also served as 1st deputy mayor in Strasbourg, "playing a key role in Strasbourg during a quarter-century".

== Biography ==
A member of the centre-right political party Union for French Democracy, the predecessor of the Democratic Movement, Koehl initially served as 1st deputy mayor in Strasbourg, Alsace, to Pierre Pflimlin and fr:Marcel Rudloff, as well as in the general department council of Bas-Rhin. He represented the citizens of Koenigshoffen, Elsau and Montagne Verte.

Koehl was subsequently elected deputy of the National Assembly of France 1978–1993, where he represented Bas-Rhin's 1st, a legislative constituency corresponding to the central cantons of Strasbourg.

Besides politics, Koehl held various civil offices, ranging from real estate to cultural heritage, including relating to Château d'Andlau in Bas-Rhin.

Together with Louis Jung, Adrien Zeller, Marcel Rudloff, and Yvonne Knorr, Émile Koehl formed "a section of history of Christian democracy in Strasbourg and Alsace". "A committed man faithful to his humanist values", "convivial and respectful of all", according to fr:André Schneider, deputy of the Union for a Popular Movement, he was "appreciated both by his friends as well as his political adversaries", according to Roland Ries, socialist mayor of Strasbourg.

Koehl, who "embodied the spirit of the neighbourhoods of Strasbourg, including the faubourg of Koenigshoffen", throughout his life remained attached to the Parish of Saint Joseph in Strasbourg and its activities (French: Paroisse Saint-Joseph).

He died on 6 January 2013 in Strasbourg, Alsace.

== Distinctions ==
- France: Chevalier of the Legion of Honour (2003)
