= Peter Kohl (physiologist) =

German scientist

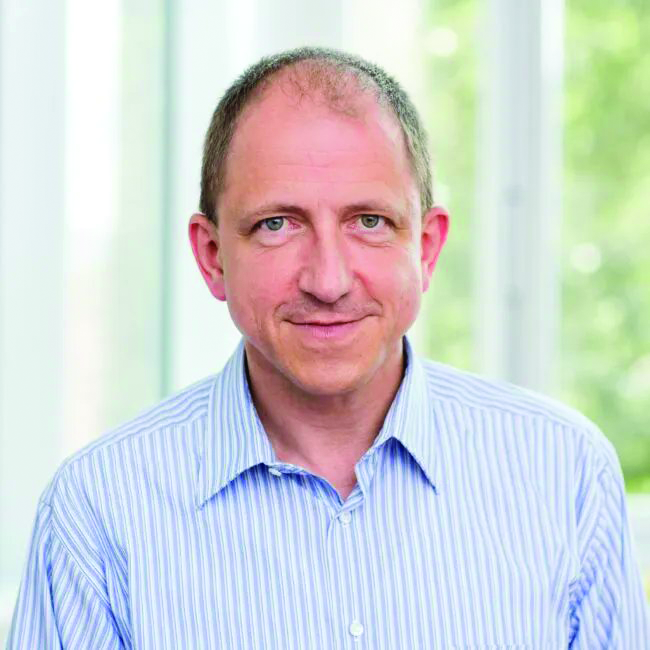
- Born: 1962 (age 63–64); Berlin, East Germany
- Awards: Fellow of the International Union of Physiological Sciences 2023 Fellow of The Physiological Society 2017; Fellow of the American Heart Association 2014 Fellow of the Heart Rhythm Society 2011
- Scientific career
- Institutions: University of Freiburg Imperial College London; University of Oxford Charité, Humboldt University of Berlin
- Website: www.med.uni-freiburg.de/en/faculty/our-professors-1/kohl-en

Peter Kohl is a German scientist specializing in integrative cardiac research. He studies heterocellular electrophysiological interactions in cardiac tissue, myocardial structure-function relationships using 'wet' and 'dry' lab models, and mechano-electrical autoregulation of the heart.

== Education ==
Kohl studied medicine and biophysics in Moscow before completing his doctorate and his residency in physiology at the Humboldt University in Berlin. Supported by a scholarship from the Boehringer-Ingelheim Foundation, he went as a post-doctoral researcher to the chair of Prof. Denis Noble, Department of Physiology at the University of Oxford, where - using a combination of experimental and theoretical models - he explored cardiac mechanobiology and heterocellular interactions.

== Career ==
Supported by personal fellowships from the UK Royal Society and the British Heart Foundation, he founded the Cardiac Mechano-Electric Feedback Lab at Oxford. Work from this time ranged from the mechanistic explanation of the Bainbridge effect (mechanically induced increase in heart rate) in isolated pacemaker cells stretched during patch clamp measurements with carbon fibres, the description of a stretch-induced increase in calcium release from the sarcoplasmic reticulum as a mechanism contributing to the Frank–Starling law, to the exploration of direct electrical coupling of cardiac fibroblasts and muscle cells.

After two decades of research and teaching at Oxford, Kohl was appointed Inaugural Chair in Cardiac Biophysics and Systems Biology at Imperial College London. Work during this time, funded by the ERC Advanced Grant CardioNECT, focused on the development and use of novel optogenetic and fluorometric techniques, resulting in the first functional demonstration of heterocellular electrical cell coupling in native heart tissue. After five years in London, Kohl was recruited to Freiburg University in 2016 as the founding director of the Institute for Experimental Cardiovascular Medicine (IEKM).

The English-language IEKM is structured with flat hierarchies and a broad interdisciplinary profile. About 40% of staff are from outside Germany, with scientific backgrounds in physiology, pharmacology, medicine, biology, physics, engineering and mathematics. The institute has grown from 6 to almost 60 staff and students in just a few years, established a novel biobank concept (in which functional data collected on live human tissue are an integral part of the biobank), and it is committed to teaching in small group formats such as the new 1-year international MSc in Medical Sciences - Cardiovascular Research with an annual intake of no more than 6 pre-PhD students.

== Honours ==
Kohl is a visiting professor at the University of Oxford and Imperial College London. He served as co-founding director (with Peter Coveney, University College London) of the Virtual Physiological Human Network of Excellence (VPH NoE) and he was the Speaker of the German national collaborative research centre SFB1425 'Make Better Scars'. From 2018 to 2020, Kohl was joint Editor-in-Chief (with Denis Noble and Tom Blundell) of Progress in Biophysics and Molecular Biology, and from 2022 to 2023, he was Editor-in-Chief of The Journal of Physiology.
