= Ernst Kuhl =

German civil engineer

Ernst Kuhl (February 9, 1843 – December 29, 1911) was a German civil and mechanical engineer.

== Early years ==
Ernst Kuhl was born in Saarlouis. At the age of 18 he graduated from the gymnasium in Trier, and in 1865 he graduated the course of civil engineering in Karlsruhe. He worked for many years as a manager of a smelting works on the river Rhine, and worked as an engineer on a North German Lloyd steamer.

== Engineer in USA ==
In 1872 Ernst Kuhl immigrated to the United States and settled in Buffalo, New York. At the beginning of 1873 he started working at the office of the Tenth Light-House District. From 1876 to 1878 he was self-employed and manufactured special devices for power transmission.

In 1878 he went back to government service. Until 1900 he was as mechanical engineer and draftsman for the improvement of the Missouri River. He designed the machinery for the towboats Arethusa and Atalanta, and for the snagboats Wright and Suter.

From 1900 to 1910 he was superintendent of the department of mechanical engineering of the United States Engineer Office at Pittsburgh, under Major William L. Sibert. He designed steamboats, dredges, structural steel and operating machinery for many locks and dams in Monongahela River.

In 1910 he was transferred to the United States Engineer Office in St. Louis. He died December 29, 1911—roughly one your after his wife died.
