= Kohal =

Kohal كهل
- Village
- Location within Iran
- Coordinates: 36°08′54″N 47°48′41″E
- Country: Iran
- Province: Kurdistan
- County: Bijar
- Bakhsh: Central
- Rural District: Seylatan

Population (2006)
  - Total: 58
- Time zone: UTC+3:30 (IRST)
  - Summer (DST): UTC+4:30 (IRDT)

Kohal (Persian: كهل) is a village in Seylatan Rural District, in the Central District of Bijar County, Kurdistan province, Iran. At the 2006 census, its population was 58, in 14 families. The village is populated by Azerbaijanis.
