= Laurent Koehl =

French opera singer

- Born: 15 March 1971 (age 55)
- Genres: Opera
- Occupations: Musician, singer
- Instrument: Vocals
- Years active: 2001-present

Laurent Koehl, born 15 March 1971, is a contemporary French tenor.

== Biography ==
Initially an audio engineer at Radio France and an amateur flautist, Laurent Koehl took his first courses in singing with fr:Udo Reinemann and fr:Gisèle Fixe.

== Opera ==
As a tenor, his scene debut was in Anna Bolena by Gaetano Donizetti at Opéra-Théâtre de Metz Métropole in Metz, where he also performed several other works, like The Sound of Music by Richard Rodgers and Oscar Hammerstein II.

In 2001, he debuted at Chorégies d'Orange in Orange with Aida by Giuseppe Verdi.

His international career has been notably launched in Austria and Belgium. In 2000, he chanted the role of Prince Ali in L'incontro improvviso by Joseph Haydn at Eisenstadt. In 2002, he debuted at the Theater an der Wien in Vienna with Don Quichotte by Jules Massenet. He further interpreted Gioachino Rossini at Liège Ruedi in William Tell in 2000 and Mitrane in Semiramide in 2001. One of his other prominent roles was as Nemorino in L'elisir d'amore by Gaetano Donizetti.

In 2011, he participated in the new production of Psyché by César Franck at the Palais Garnier in Paris.

During the season of 2014–2015, he participated as soloist in the Orchestre Romantique Européen under the direction de Lionel Stoléru at the Salle Gaveau in Paris.

== Discography ==
Dessine-moi un mouton (2005), single, with Christian Lyon.
