= Lia Kohl =

Cellist

Lia Kohl is a cellist, composer, and sound artist based in Chicago. She incorporates non-traditional sounds into her compositions, such as tornado sirens, turn signals, and noises from airplanes and self-checkouts. She has collaborated extensively with numerous other experimental musicians and sound artists, notably Whitney Johnson and Macie Stewart.

== Biography ==
Kohl is classically trained as a cellist. She began playing cello as a high schooler in San Francisco, and enrolled in Indiana University's cello program, continuing her classical studies in New York and Chicago. While in Chicago, she began collaborating and experimenting beyond the classical repertoire, participating in improvisations. She was a colleague and frequent collaborator of Mars Williams's.

Kohl has released a total of six solo albums and thirteen collaborative albums. Her solo record Normal Sounds incorporated mundane or ordinary noises with cello and synthesizer. The record was critically acclaimed, with Philip Sherburne writing that Kohl "finds meditative grace in the city's most annoying sounds." Normal Sounds was named the 47th greatest album of 2024 by The Alternative.

In 2025, she produced a large piece in Chicago Union Station, "Union Station Music," performed by herself and nine other musicians. She released the album Various Small Whistles and a Song, which featured claire rousay and other musicians. The album was a response to Ed Ruscha's 1965 book Various Small Fires and Milk, and mirrors its structure of fifteen images of fire and one of milk by incorporating fifteen whistles and one song.
