= Christoph Kohl =

German chemist and industrial leader (born 1900)

Christoph Kohl (born 11 January 1900 in Frankfurt) was a German chemist and industrial leader. He was chairman of the board of directors and CEO of the chemical and pharmaceutical company Cassella from 1964, chairman of its supervisory board and chairman of the supervisory board of Riedel-de Haën.

After obtaining a doctoral degree in chemistry at the Goethe University Frankfurt and briefly working at the firm Kalle & Co. in Biebrich, he was employed at Cassella on 1 July 1922. As its long-time production manager he had a central role in rebuilding the company during the early Cold War. In 1952 he became a member of the board of directors. He succeeded Werner Zerweck as chairman of the board of directors (CEO) in 1964. He later also became chairman of the supervisory board of Riedel-de Haën and chairman of the supervisory board of Cassella.

He was a co-inventor of several patents.
