= Qeshlaq-e Kohol =

Qeshlaq-e Kohol قشلاق كهل
- Village
- Location within Iran
- Coordinates: 38°35′28″N 47°29′17″E
- Country: Iran
- Province: East Azerbaijan
- County: Ahar
- Bakhsh: Central
- Rural District: Vargahan

Population (2006)
  - Total: 57
- Time zone: UTC+3:30 (IRST)
  - Summer (DST): UTC+4:30 (IRDT)

Qeshlaq-e Kohol (Persian: قشلاق كهل, also Romanized as Qeshlāq-e Kohol; also known as Kohol) is a village in Vargahan Rural District, in the Central District of Ahar County, East Azerbaijan Province, Iran. At the 2006 census, its population was 57, in 11 families.
