= Ingeborg Kühler =

German architect

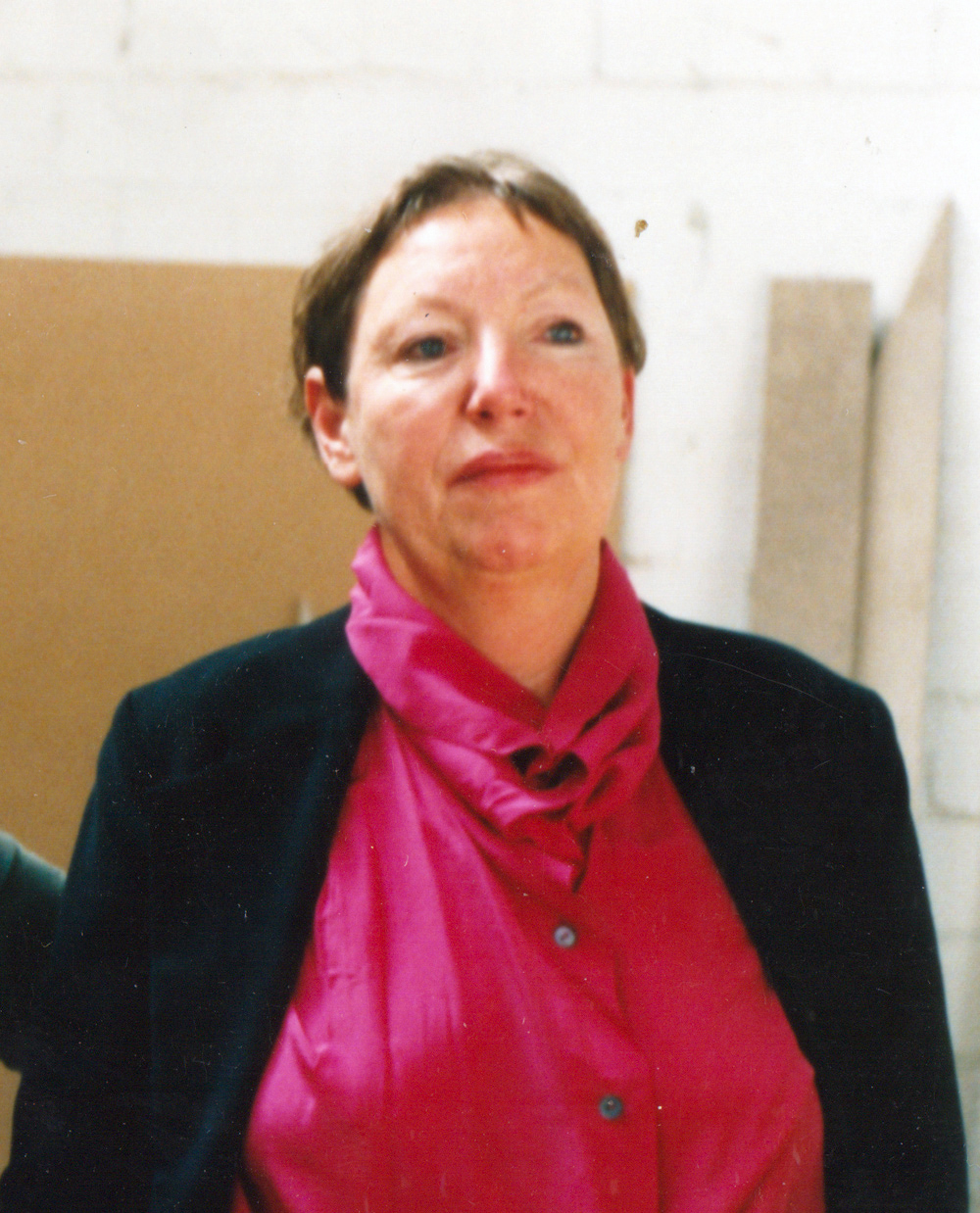
Ingeborg Kuhler, May 2020, Berlin

Ingeborg Kühler (born 25 May 1943, in Dachau, Bavaria) is a German architect, engineer and university lecturer. She was the first female design professor at a West German architecture faculty and designed the plans for the Technoseum in Mannheim.

She lives in Berlin.

== Works (selection) ==
- 1983–1889: Studio of the South German Radio in Mannheim
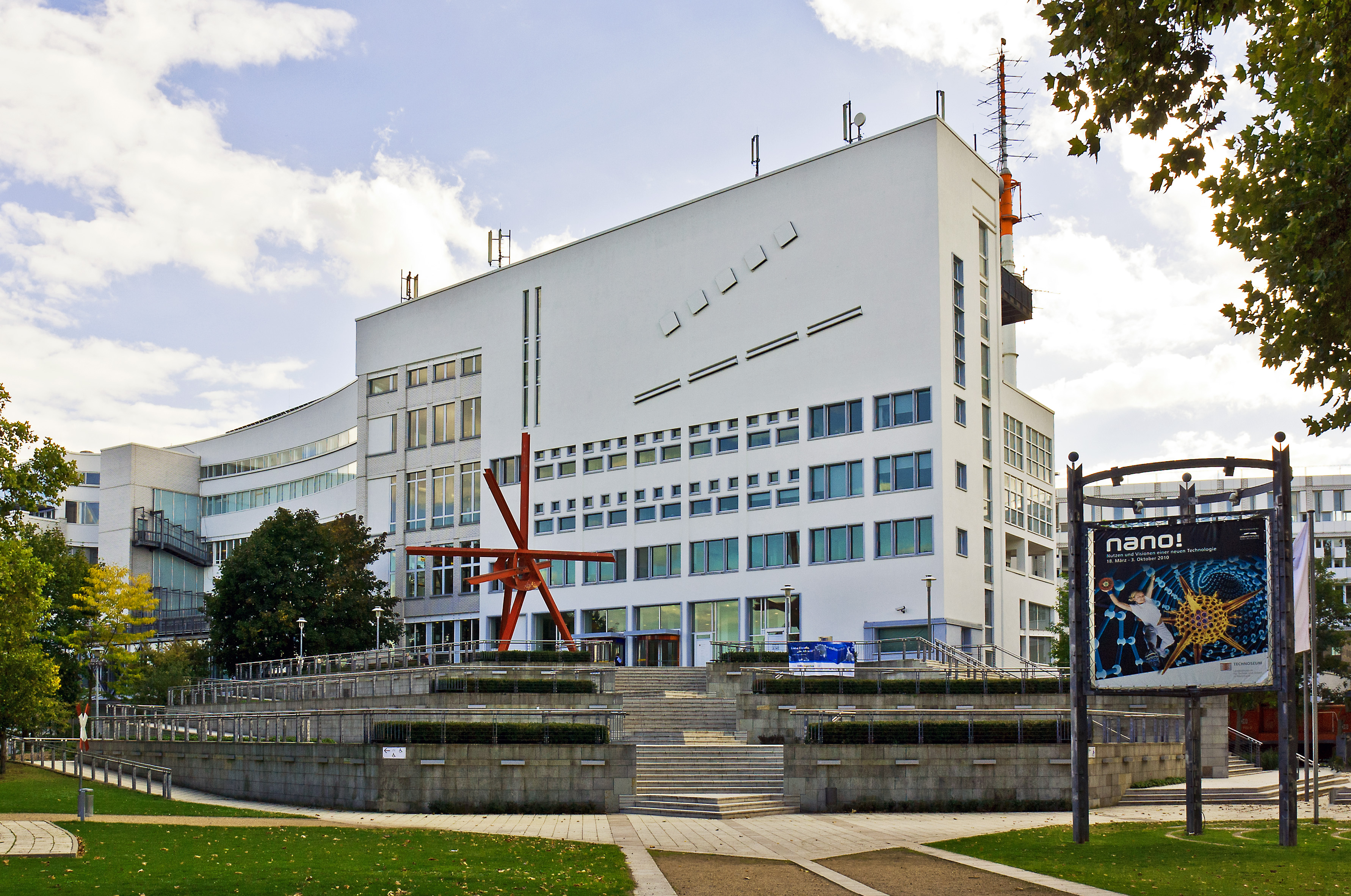
- Technoseum, Mannheim, 1983–1990
  1983–1990: State Museum for Technology and Work "Technoseum" in Mannheim, 1990
- 1990–2001: Residence in Berlin-Kladow, 2001
- 2008: 1st exhibition of drawings and watercolors

== Awards ==
- Förderungspreis des Kunstpreises Berlin for the field of architecture, together with the garden and landscape architect Dirk Jürgen Zilling, 1986
- European Award for Museum Design, 1992, for the "Technoseum" State Museum of Technology and Labor
- BDA Award for Good Buildings, 1990
- German Steel Construction Award, recognition
- 30 September 2017 – 8 March 2018, FRAU ARCHITEKT: In the film and exhibition at the German Architecture Museum in Frankfurt and in the catalog for the exhibition FRAU ARCHITEKT.

== Literature ==
- Karin Wilhelm: "Das Auge wandert mit": Die Architektin Ingeborg Kuhler. In: Mary Pepchinski et al. (eds.): Frau Architekt. Seit mehr als 100 Jahren: Frauen im Architektenberuf. Wasmuth, Tübingen 2017, ISBN 978-3-8030-0829-9, p. 221–225, 299.
