= Kühl =

Kuehl
- Pronunciation: German pronunciation: [koːl]
- Language: German language

Origin
- Languages: From Proto-West Germanic *kōl(ī), whence also Old English cōl
- Origin: Kuehl
- Meaning: "Cool"; "cold"
- Region of origin: Southern Germanosphere sprachraum

Other names
- Alternative spelling: Kühl
- Variant form: Upper German: Koehl/Köhl
- Cognate: "Cool"

Kühl, also sometimes spelled Kuehl, is a German surname.

According to one etymology, it constitutes an epithetic surname derived from a byname of the word kühl, meaning "cool"; "cold".

== Notable people ==
- Alexander Kühl (born 1973), a former German professional basketball player
- Ernst Kühl (1888–1972), a Luftwaffe officer during World War II
- Jane Kuehl (born 2003), American ice hockey player
- Jerry Kuehl (1931–2018), historian and tv producer
- Karl Kuehl (1937–2008), an American scout, coach and manager in Major League Baseball
- Kris Kuehl (born 1970), an American discus thrower
- Patrick Kühl (born 1968), a German swimmer
- Ryan Kuehl (born 1972), a National Football League long snapper/defensive tackle
- Sheila Kuehl (born 1941), an American politician and former child actress

== See also ==
- Kuhl
- Kuhle
