= Keith Baverstock =

British medical researcher

Dr Keith Baverstock is a former regional adviser for Radiation and Public Health, World Health Organization and current medical researcher and Docent in the Department of Environmental Science at the University of Eastern Finland.

His primary research focus on how the cell is regulated, which he claims was stimulated by "the uncovering of the property of ionising radiation to induce instability in the genome and the related effect, the so called bystander effect, in which a cell experiencing damage inflicted by ionising radiation affects surrounding cells, which then exhibit effects similar to the genomic instability." His long term research interests have included the effects of low doses of radiation, the toxicity of depleted uranium and the consequences of nuclear accidents. Baverstock has urged further research into the biological effects of the fallout from Chernobyl and Fukushima nuclear accidents.

In October 2015, Baverstock said of the Fukushima nuclear disaster that it was in breach of international laws prohibiting the dumping of radioactivity into the sea. He stated his belief the media, with particular reference to Europe, was under-reporting the ongoing problems at Fukushima. Of the general public's perception, he said:

"I think many people would be very surprised that it was still a matter for discussion. They would be even more surprised to learn that it’s still an ongoing accident, and that it hasn’t terminated yet… and they would be more surprised to learn that nobody knows how to stop it."

Since the year 2000, Baverstock's work has been published in various medical and scientific journals, including The Journal of Physiology, Journal of the Royal Society Interface, Progress in Biophysics & Molecular Biology, The International Journal of Environmental Research and Public Health, Mutation Research, Cellular and Molecular Life Sciences, British Medical Journal (BMJ), Radiation Protection Dosimetry, PLoS One, Energy & Environment, Journal of the Royal Society of Medicine, Environmental Health Perspectives, Nature, Journal of Radiological Protection, Medicine, Conflict and Survival and Science.
