= Keheldasht =

Village in Ardabil province, Iran

Keheldasht Persian: كهل دشت
- Village
- Location within Iran
- Coordinates: 37°12′13″N 48°47′29″E
- Country: Iran
- Province: Ardabil
- County: Khalkhal
- District: Shahrud
- Rural District: Shal

Population (2016)
  - Total: 28
- Time zone: UTC+3:30 (IRST)

Keheldasht (Persian: كهل دشت) is a village in Shal Rural District of Shahrud District in Khalkhal County, Ardabil province, Iran.

== Demographics ==
=== Population ===
At the time of the 2006 National Census, the village's population was 66 in 17 households. The following census in 2011 counted 72 people in 20 households. The 2016 census measured the population of the village as 28 people in eight households.
