= Kuhle =

Kuhle is a German surname. Kühle has been considered a phonetic variant.

According to one etymology, it constitutes a topographic surname derived from a place of residence, from Middle High German (Central German) kūle 'pit', Middle Low German kūle 'pit, depression, hole'.

== Notable people ==
- Birgithe Kühle (1762–1832), Danish-Norwegian journalist
- Konstantin Kuhle (born 1989), German politician
- Matthias Kuhle (1948–2015), German geographer
- Søren Anton van der Aa Kühle (1849–1906), Danish brewer

== See also ==
- Kuhle Sonkosi (born 1992), South African rugby union player
- Kühl
