= Kohl =

Kohl may refer to:

- Kohl (cosmetics), an ancient eye cosmetic
- Kohl (surname), including a list of people with the surname
- Kohl's, an American department store retail chain
- KOHL, a radio station in Fremont, California, United States
- Kohl Children's Museum in Glenview, Illinois, United States
- Kohl Drake (born 2000), American baseball player

== See also ==
- Kohol (disambiguation)
- Kohl v. United States, a U.S. Supreme Court case
