= Élise Voïart =

French writer (1786 - 1866)

Elise Voiart
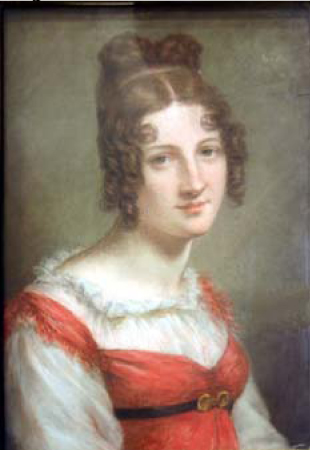
- Voiart in 1811
- Born: Anne-Élisabeth-Élise Petitpain; 10 February 1786; Nancy, France
- Died: 22 January 1866 (aged 79); Nancy, France
- Occupations: Writer, translator, salon-holder
- Spouse: Jacques Philippe Voïart
- Children: 3 including Amable Tastu, Élisabeth Voïart

Élise Voïart (1786-1866) was a writer and translator from Nancy, France, specializing in historical works, fiction and children's books. She held literary salons at her home when she lived near Paris.

== Biography ==
Élise was born 10 February 1786, Anne-Élisabeth-Élise Petitpain, in Nancy, France, the oldest of eight children. Her father was the organist at the Cathedral in Nancy but died at a young age. Élise expanded her knowledge of German by assisting her stepfather M. Wouters, a local manufacturer, with his business. In 1807, Monsignor Antoine Eustache d'Osmond, had the idea of having her admitted to the court of Josephine, which resulted in the Empress giving the young lady a pension of 500 francs and the hope of being admitted to a special secondary school for daughters of recipients of the Legion of Honor, called Écouen.

Élise intended to enter Écouen, but at 20, she met and married a widower thirty years older, Jacques-Philippe Voïart, food administrator at Les Invalides and art lover who already had two daughters, including the future poet Amable Tastu (1795-1885) whose literacy education Élise nurtured.

The new couple had one child, a daughter, Élisabeth Voïart (c. 1814-1875), who became a pastellist artist. The Voïart family took up residence in Choisy-le-Roi outside Paris, where Élise ran a liberal-minded salon frequented by Adélaïde-Gillette Dufrénoy, "la Sapho française," the popular singer Béranger, and the artist couple Pierre-Paul Prud'hon and Constance Mayer who painted a portrait of Élise Voïart that is held at the Museum of Fine Arts of Nancy.

=== Translations ===
The first publications of Élise Voïart (sometimes spelled Voyart) were translations from German and English into French. She produced 30 volumes between 1817 and 1821; most were sentimental novels by August Lafontaine, which she did not hesitate to revise, thus appropriating the writing. For Fridolin by Friedrich Schiller, however, Élise opted instead to stick rigorously to the text, saying it was the only way to make "the touching and naive simplicity inherent to the character and the German language." In doing so, she freed the work from rhyme, thus promoting free verse poetry.

=== Novels ===
Élise Voïart's first historical novel, The Virgin of Arduene, described the passage of Gaul under Roman rule during the reign of Augustus. It became part of the romantic movement to rediscover France's past. A review of the work by Auguste Lafontaine describes the author's strong female characters.

"Élisa Voïart enthusiastically painted this ancient Gaul where women were almost deified. Struck with the influence that in all times her sex exerted on our mores, she sought the origin, and thought she found it based on religious principles, passed out in the wave of centuries, but preserved until today by popular traditions: the Gauls and the Germans, according to Tacitus, attributed something divine to their wives; recognition and love, continues Voïart, made this cult lasting."

Élise also wrote commissioned works intended for the Ladies ' Encyclopedia (Letters on the ladies' toilet, 1821; Essay on ancient and modern dance, 1823).

=== Young adult works ===
At the beginning of the 1830s, Voïart wrote for the booming educational and feminine press, contributing to the Journal des dames, the Journal des Demoiselles and the Journal des jeunes personnes. In the process of supporting her stepdaughter, the poet Amable Tastu during the bankruptcy of her husband's printing business, together they begin to collect fairy tales. Eager to promote national cultures, she translated the Popular Songs of the Servians (1834).

=== Last years ===
In 1836, the Voïarts offered their hospitality to the aging and bankrupt Rouget de Lisle, famous for writing the words and music of the French national anthem, the Marseillaise. (He died at 76 in Choisy-le-Roi.)

After her husband's death in 1842, Élise Voïart moved back to her birthplace, Nancy, where she composed historical Lorraine novels and earned her the status of "the Walter Scott of Lorraine." She also signed a series of novels for the collection of the “Library of little children” created by the Catholic publisher Alfred Mame in 1845. In children's literature dominated by “a massive production of bland and bland moral stories,” Voïart's stories are distinguished by a precise observation of the world of childhood and the staging of autonomous female characters.

=== Accolades ===
For her novel The Woman, or the six loves, Voïart was honored by the French Academy with the Montyon Prize in 1828.

Voïart growing notoriety caused her to be included in collections such as Montferrand's Femmes célèbres (1843) and the Book of the Hundred and one by Pierre-François Ladvocat, where she is listed among the most prominent literary figures.

In 1868, Voïart was elected an associate member of the Stanislas Academy, the first woman to be so honored.

=== Death ===
Voïart died on 22 January 1866 in Nancy at the age of 79.

== Critiques ==
The literary critic Sainte-Beuve wrote condescendingly about Voïart's work, citing her "young, gifted (...) taste and talent for writing, known by several nice books." However, her books and translations have been held in libraries continuously since the 1821. As of 2017, Worldcat.org lists 235 works in 523 publications in 4 languages could be found in libraries worldwide.

== Selected works ==
Only a few of her many works are listed. Some were published in multiple editions.

- The Virgin of Arduene, Gallic traditions, Battle, 1821.
- Letters on the ladies' toilet, Paris, Audot, 1822.
- Essay on ancient and modern dance, 1823.
- La Femme ou les Six Amours, A. Dupont, 6 vol., 1827–1828.
- Fridolin (Schiller), with a literal translation of the ballad by Elise Voïart, Audot, 1829.
- Faust twenty-six prints from the drawings of Retzsch with an analysis of Goethe's drama, by Elise Voïart, Audot, 1828.
- The Dragon of Rhodes (Schiller), with a literal translation of the ballad by Elise Voïart, Audot, 1829.
- The Cross of murder, the last novel of August Lafontaine, free translation by Elise Voïart, Paris, Delongchamps, 1831, 4 vols.
- Ring L. Kruze, free translation by Elise Voïart, Paris, Delongchamps, 1832
- Popular songs Servien, collected by Vuk Stephanowisch and translated from Talvy by Elise Voïart, Merklein, 1834, 2 vols.
- Marriage and Love, contemporary anecdote, Paris, Delongchamps, 1834.
- Cute, imitated from the German by Elise Voïart, Delongchamps, 1834, 2 vols.
- New popular tales, Miss Edgeworth, translated from English by Elise Voïart, Paris, Baudouin, 1835, 4 vols.
- Fairy Tales: The book of children, chosen by Elise Voïart and Amable Tastu, Paulin, 1836–1838, 6 vols.
- Le Robinson suisse, by Wyss, translated from German by Élise Voïart, Didier, 1837, 2 vol.
- Children of the Andlau Valley or Familiar Notions on Religion, Morals and the Wonders of Nature, by Mesdames E. Voïart and A. Tastu, Didier, 1837, 2 vol.
- Now guess! Lorraine tradition - 1272, Dumont, 1841, 2 vol.
- Jacques Callot, 1606 to 1637, Paris, Dumont, 1841.
- The Visit to Prisoners, Paris, P. Mellier, 1844.
- La Petite Chapelle, Tours, Alfred Mame, 1845.
- Medor, the good dog, Tours, Alfred Mame, 1845
- La Petite Fille vouée au blanc, Tours, Alfred Mame, 1845
- Éliane, souvenirs de Normandie, Tours, Alfred Mame, 1845.
- The Little Green Book, or how we learn to read well, Tours, Alfred Mame, 1845.
- New Years Day, Tours, Alfred Mame, 1845.
- The Bethlehem, Tours, Alfred Mame, 1846.
- Anna the obstinate, Tours, Alfred Mame, 1845.
- The Wooden Horse, Tours, Alfred Mame, 1849.
- The Finch Nest, Tours, Alfred Mame, 1849.
- Petit Pierre and Pierrette, Tours, Alfred Mame, 1849.
