= Humanity Through the Ages =

La Civilisation à travers les âges
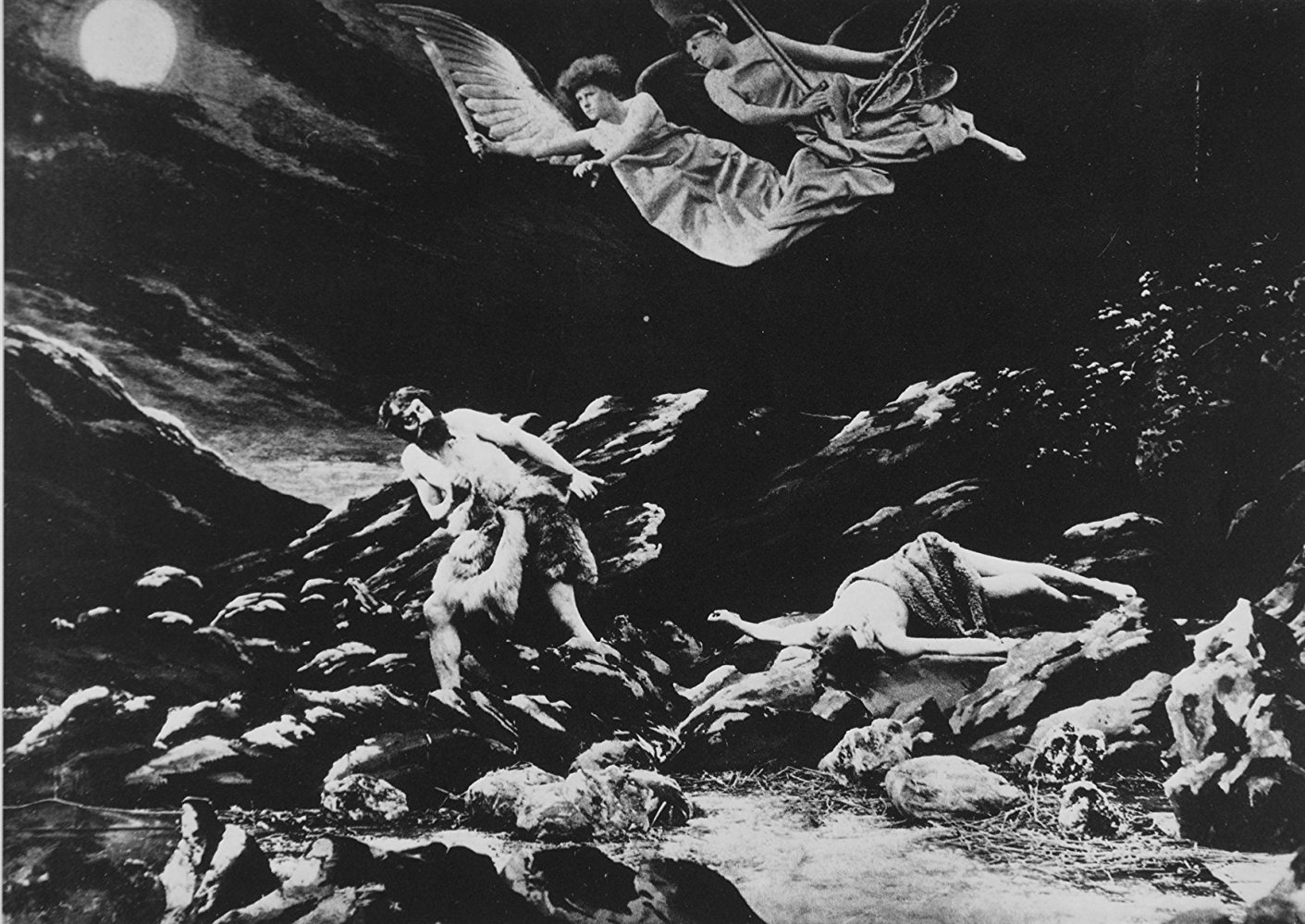
- Promotional still of the film, showing the story of Cain and Abel
- Directed by: Georges Méliès
- Written by: Georges Méliès
- Produced by: Georges Méliès
- Production company: Star Film Company
- Release date: 1908
- Running time: 320 meters
- Country: France
- Language: Silent

Humanity Through the Ages (French: La Civilisation à travers les âges), released in the US initially as Humanity Through Ages, is a 1908 historical drama film directed by Georges Méliès. The film, now presumed lost, is an episodic narrative displaying examples of humankind's brutality, from the story of Cain and Abel through the Hague Convention of 1907.

== Summary ==
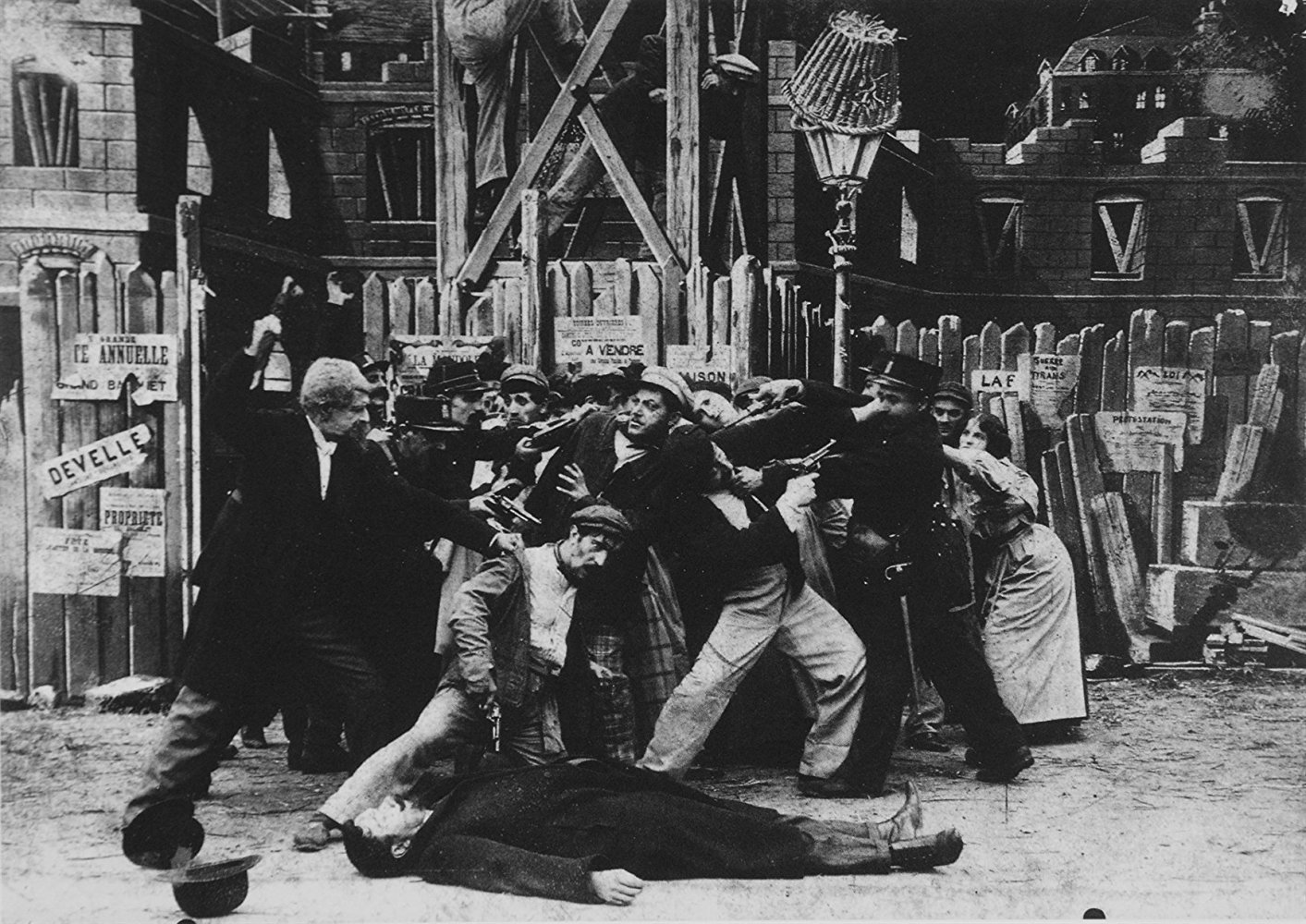
Another promotional still of the film, showing the Parisian apaches.

The film's first ten episodes feature Cain and Abel, the Druids, Nero and Locusta, the persecution of Christians in the Roman Empire, the pillories of the Middle Ages, the Gibbet of Montfaucon, torture processes in the Middle Ages, Louis XIII, contemporary Parisian apaches, and the Hague Convention of 1907. The Hague scene ends with the convention collapsing into chaos, with the delegates, who had convened to limit the power of armies, directly attacking each other. The eleventh and final scene, titled "Triumph", shows an Angel of Destruction hovering over a battlefield covered with dead and wounded soldiers.

== Production ==
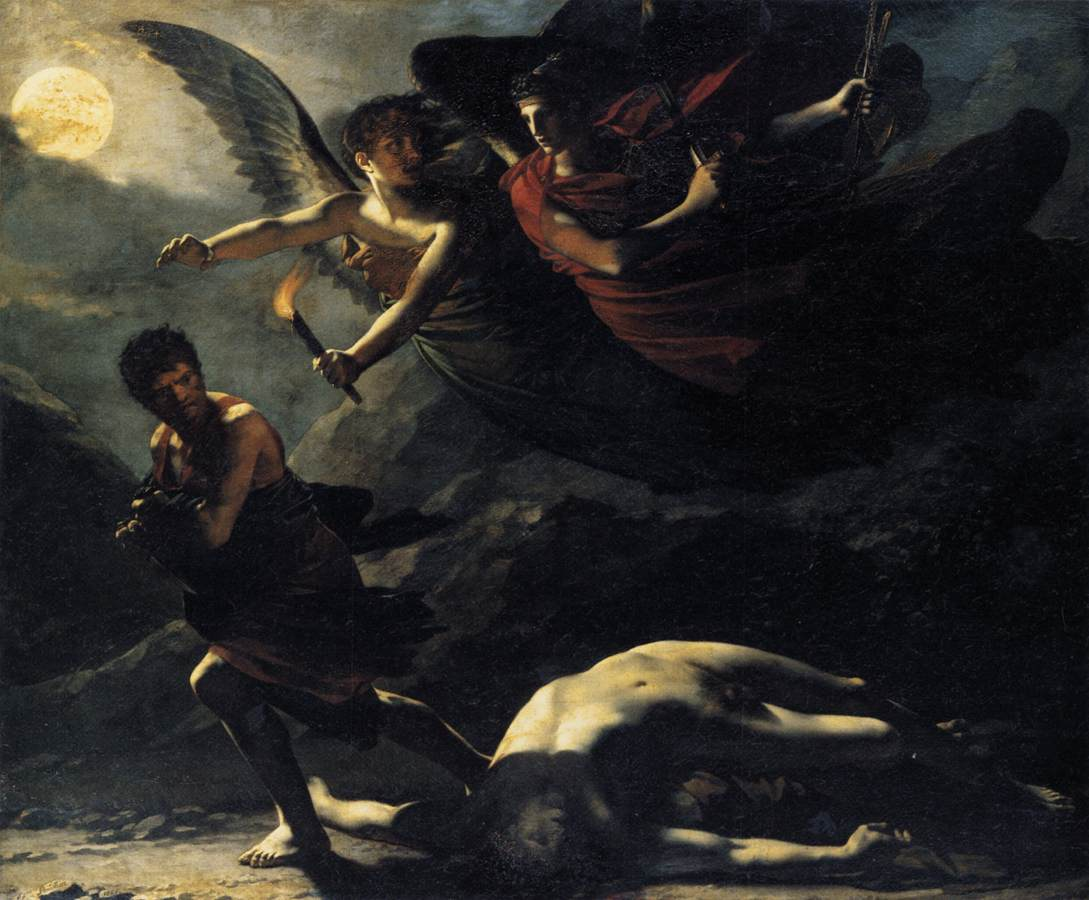
Prud'hon's Justice and Divine Vengeance Pursuing Crime

Humanity Through the Ages was made in response to successful historical films such as The Last Days of Pompeii, and directed in a highly serious style contrasting sharply with most of Méliès's work. Méliès made two appearances in the film, as a druid and as a judge in the Spanish Inquisition. The first scene includes a moment staged by Méliès to recreate Pierre-Paul Prud'hon's 1808 painting Justice and Divine Vengeance Pursuing Crime.

The Méliès scholars Paul Hammond and John Frazer have noted that the film's highly pessimistic tone is unusual among Méliès's work; both scholars have suggested that the pessimism derives from the intense commercial pressure Méliès felt from competitors during the making of the film.

== Release and reception ==
The film was released by Méliès's Star Film Company as its first film of 1908 and numbered 1050–1065 in its catalogs. It was registered for American copyright at the Library of Congress on 7 February 1908. According to the film historian Jay Leyda, the film created a sensation when it was released in Russia.

Méliès's son, André Méliès, reported that Humanity Through the Ages was the film his father felt proudest of. It is now presumed lost.
