= Amable Tastu =

French poet and writer

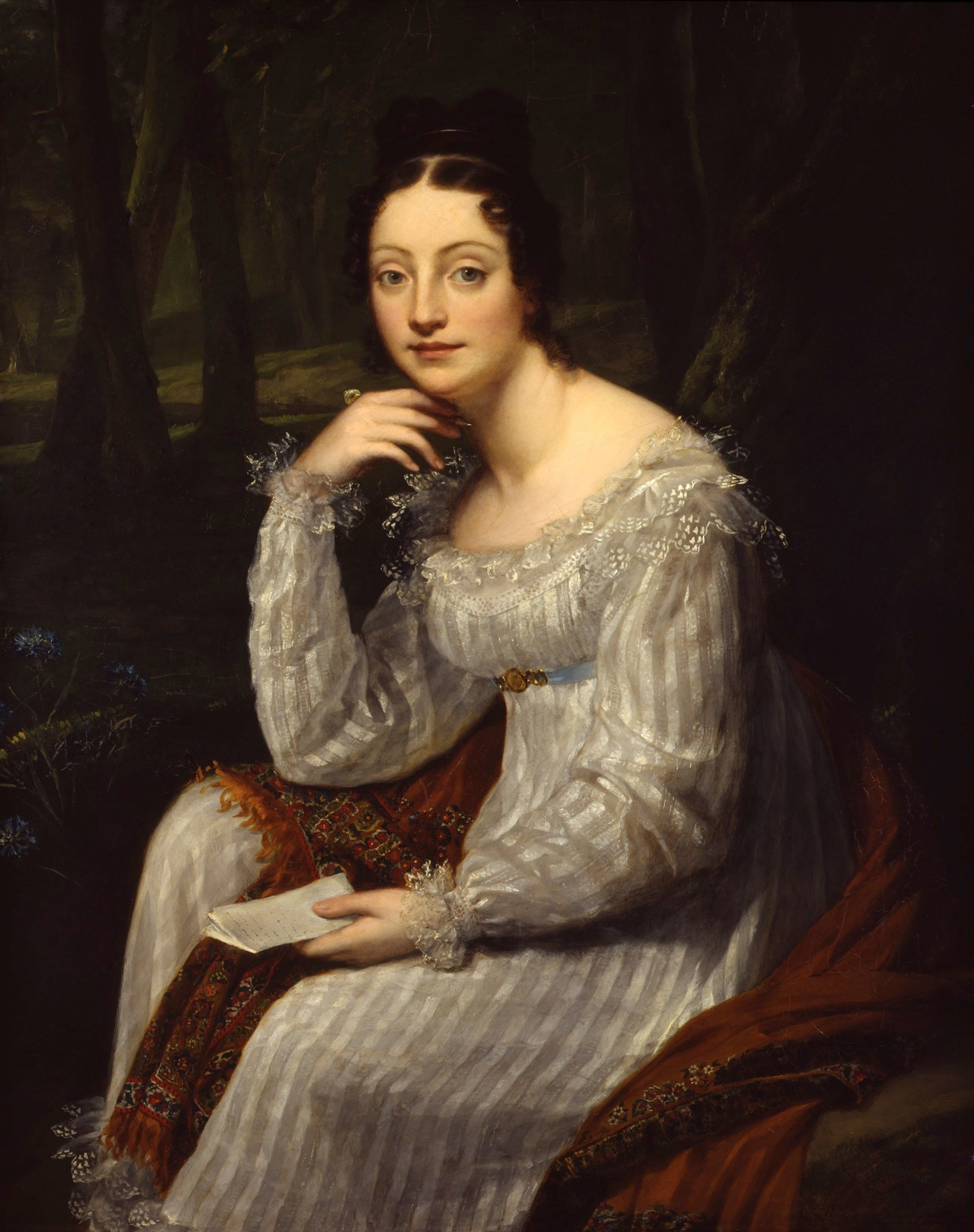
- Constance Mayer, Portrait of Amable Tastu, 1817 (Metz, Musée de la Cour d'Or)
- Born: Sabine Casimire Amable Voïart; 30 August 1795; Metz, France
- Died: 10 January 1885 (aged 89); Palaiseau, France
- Occupation: Femme de lettres
- Spouse: Joseph Tastu

Amable Tastu, born Sabine Casimire Amable Voïart, (30 August 1795 - 10 January 1885) was a 19th-century French poet and writer (femme de lettres).

== Biography ==
Amable was born in Metz, northeastern France to Jacques-Philippe Voïart and Jeanne-Amable Bouchotte. Four years after her mother died in 1802, her father married Anne-Élisabeth-Élise Petitpain (who became known as Élise Voïart), a woman of letters, 30 years his junior, from Nancy, France who shared with Amable her knowledge of English, German and Italian.

After an early poem "Le Narcisse" (The Narcissus) was published in 1816 by Mercure de France (the French Mercury gazette), Amable's work was noticed by Adelaïde Dufrénoy who became a patron and with whom she developed a close friendship. Her poetry was praised for its delicacy by the literary critic Sainte-Beuve.

In 1816, Amable married Joseph Tastu, a printer in Perpignan and they had one child. But in 1830, the bankruptcy of her husband's printing business spurred Tastu to support her family by working in the book trade. She produced educational works as well as literary criticisms including guides to Italian and German literature: Tableau de la littérature italienne (1843), and Tableau de la littérature allemande, respectively.

According to Buck, after Amable's husband died in 1849, Tastu "accompanied her son on diplomatic missions to Cyprus, Baghdad, Belgrade and Alexandria, and only returned to France in 1864 when her sight began to fail."

Amable died 10 January 1885 in Palaiseau (Essonne) France.

== Works ==
- 1821: La Chevalerie française, Ambroise Tardieu, Paris.
- 1825: Ode sur la mort de madame Dufrénoy, Joseph Tastu, Paris.
- 1826: Poésies, Joseph Tastu, Paris.
- 1829: Chroniques de France, Paris, Delangle Frères.
- 1832: Soirées littéraires de Paris, Janet, Paris.
- 1835: Poésies nouvelles, Paris, Denain et Delamare.
- 1835: Œuvres de Madame Tastu, in 2 volumes. Brussels, E. Laurent.
- 1836: Prose, J. Jamar, Brussels.
- 1837: Cours d’histoire de France. Lectures tirées des chroniques et des mémoires, avec un précis de l’histoire de France, Lavigne, Paris.
- 1838: Chroniques de France, Didier, Paris.
- 1842: Alpes et Pyrénées; arabesques littéraires. Composées de nouvelles historiques, anecdotes, descriptions, chroniques et récits divers, P.-C. Lehuby, Paris.
- 1843: Tableau de la littérature allemande depuis l’établissement du christianisme jusqu’à nos jours, Alfred Mame, Tours, rééd 1858.
- 1843: Les femmes célèbres, contemporaines françaises. Le Bailly, libraire, Paris.
- 1845: La Normandie historique, pittoresque et monumentale, P.-C. Lehuby, Paris.
- 1846: Voyage en France, Alfred Mame et cie, Tours.
- 1848: Éducation maternelle : simples leçons d’une mère à ses enfants, Didier, Paris.
- 1858: Poésies complètes, Didier, Paris.
- 1870: Tableau de la littérature italienne depuis l’établissement du christianisme jusqu’à nos jours, Alfred Mame, Tours.

== Bibliography ==
- Émile Albert Babeau, Madame Amable Tastu; sa vie et son œuvre, Toulouse, Douladoure, 1945.
- Ferdinand Des Robert, Madame Tastu (Sabine-Casimir-Amable), 1798-1885, Nancy, Berger-Levrault, 1887.
- Afifa Marzouki, Amable Tastu, une poétesse à l’époque romantique, Tunis, Publications de la Faculté des lettres de la Manouba, 1997 ISBN 9789973936059
- Catherine Poussard-Joly, Madame Tastu ou La muse oubliée : Biographie, Palaiseau, Société historique de Palaiseau, 1995 ISBN 9782950660329
- Maurice Souriau, Grandeur et décadence de Mme. Amable Tastu, Paris, Société française d’imprimerie et de librairie, 1910.
- Marie Daffini, « L'amour de Madame Tastu pour Metz et la Lorraine » in La Nouvelle Revue, Lorraine, n°35 (December 2015–January 2016)
- André Bellard, « Pléiade messine » in Mémoires de l'Académie nationale de Metz, n°59, 1966–1967.
