= Madame Georges Anthony and Her Two Sons =

1796 oil on canvas by Pierre-Paul Prud'hon

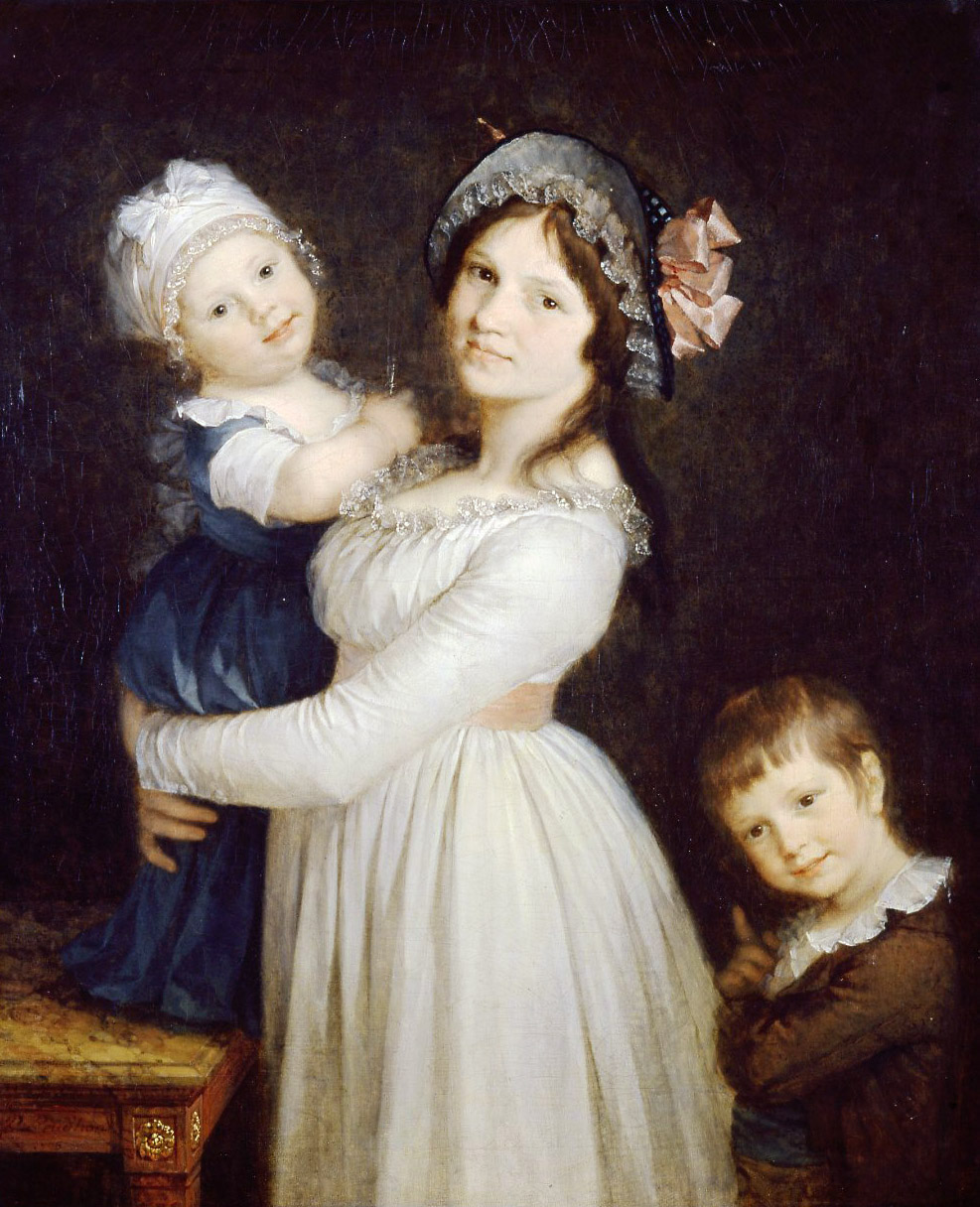
- Artist: Pierre-Paul Prud'hon
- Year: 1796
- Medium: Oil on canvas
- Dimensions: 98 cm × 81 cm (39 in × 32 in)
- Location: Museum of Fine Arts of Lyon, Lyon

Madame Georges Anthony and Her Two Sons is an oil on canvas group portrait by Pierre-Paul Prud'hon, from 1796. It is held in the Museum of Fine Arts of Lyon, which acquired it in 1892.

Two years earlier the artist had fled Paris to escape the Thermidorian Reaction, following Robespierre's fall. He took refuge in a family home at Rigny near Gray, occupied by the postmaster Georges Anthony, his wife Louise (née Demandre) and their children. As a thank-you for their hospitality, Prud'hon painted this work and a portrait of Georges beside a horse (now in the Musée des Beaux-Arts de Dijon), both completed in 1796, the year he left their home. During the restoration of the Musée des Beaux-Arts de Dijon in 2016, the paintings were briefly reunited in Lyon.
