= Self-Portrait of the Artist with her Father =

Painting by Constance Mayer

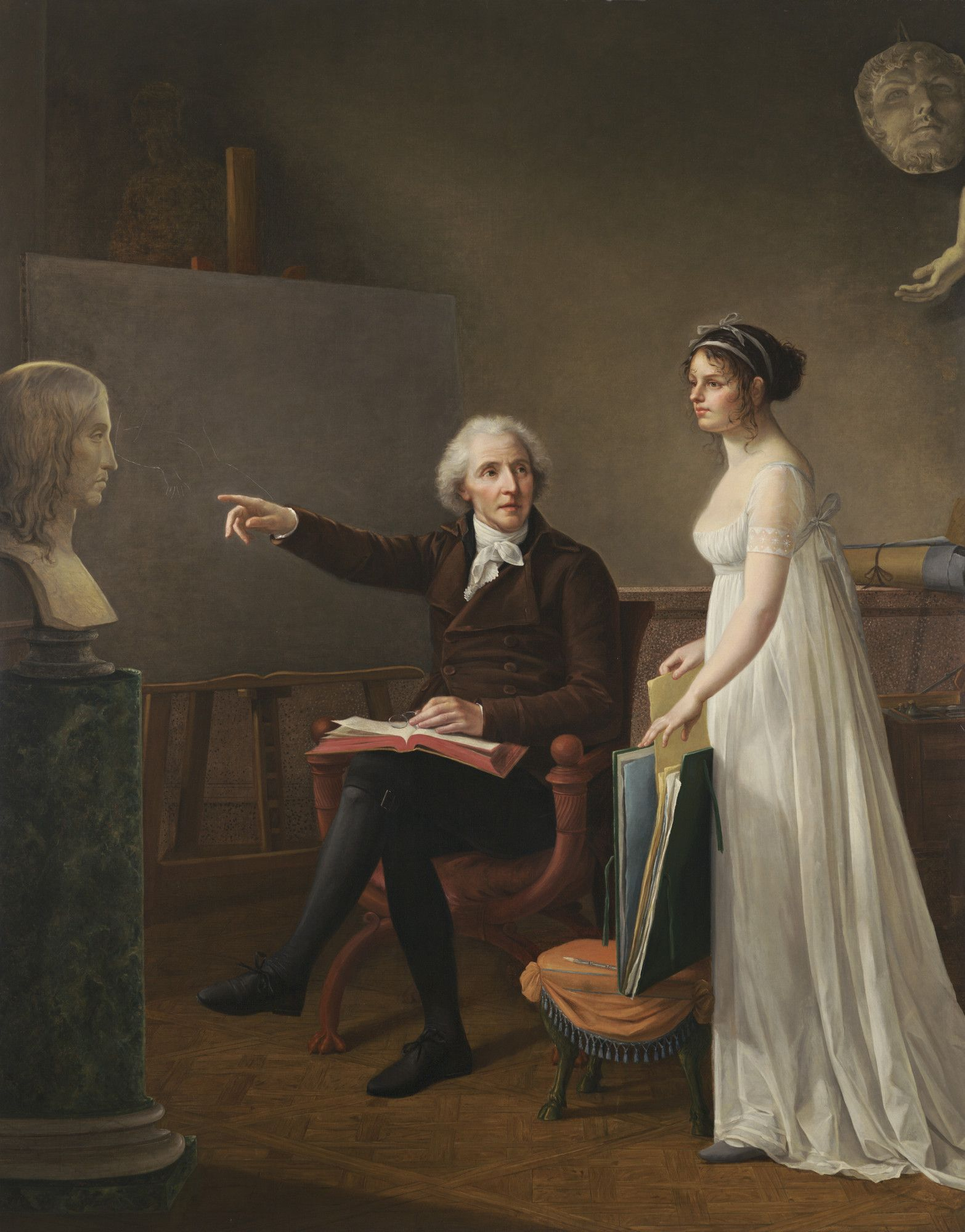
Self-Portrait of the Artist with her Father (1801) by Constance Mayer

Self-Portrait of the Artist with her Father is an oil on canvas painting by Constance Mayer, showing her with her father Pierre and (left) a bust of Raphael, to which he points as an example for her. First exhibited at the Paris Salon of 1801 as Standing Portrait of a Father and his Daughter, it was bought at auction at Sotheby's New York in 1989 for $120,000 by its present owner, the Wadsworth Atheneum, a record price at auction for the artist until June 2023.
