= Adélaïde Dufrénoy =

French poet (1765–1825)

Adélaïde-Gillette Dufrénoy
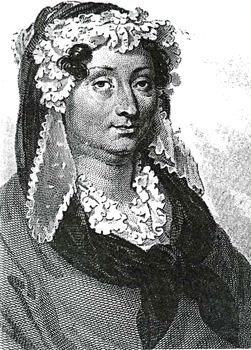
- Born: 3 December 1765; Nantes, Pays de la Loire
- Died: 8 March 1825 (aged 59); Paris, Île-de-France
- Occupations: Poet, painter, novelist, translator
- Spouse: Simon Petit-Dufrénoy (m. 1779; died 1812)
- Children: Armand Dufrénoy
- Relatives: Jean-Louis Laya (cousin)
- Writing career
- Language: French
- Period: 1787–1825
- Subjects: Elegy, erotica
- Literary movement: Pre-romantic

Signature
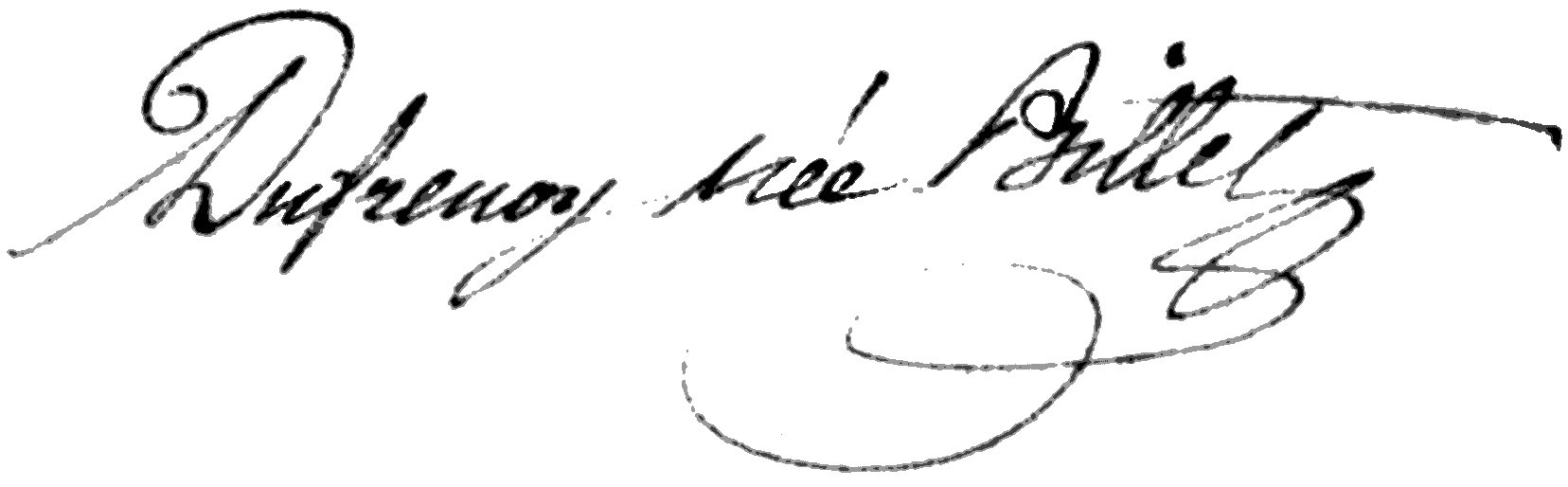

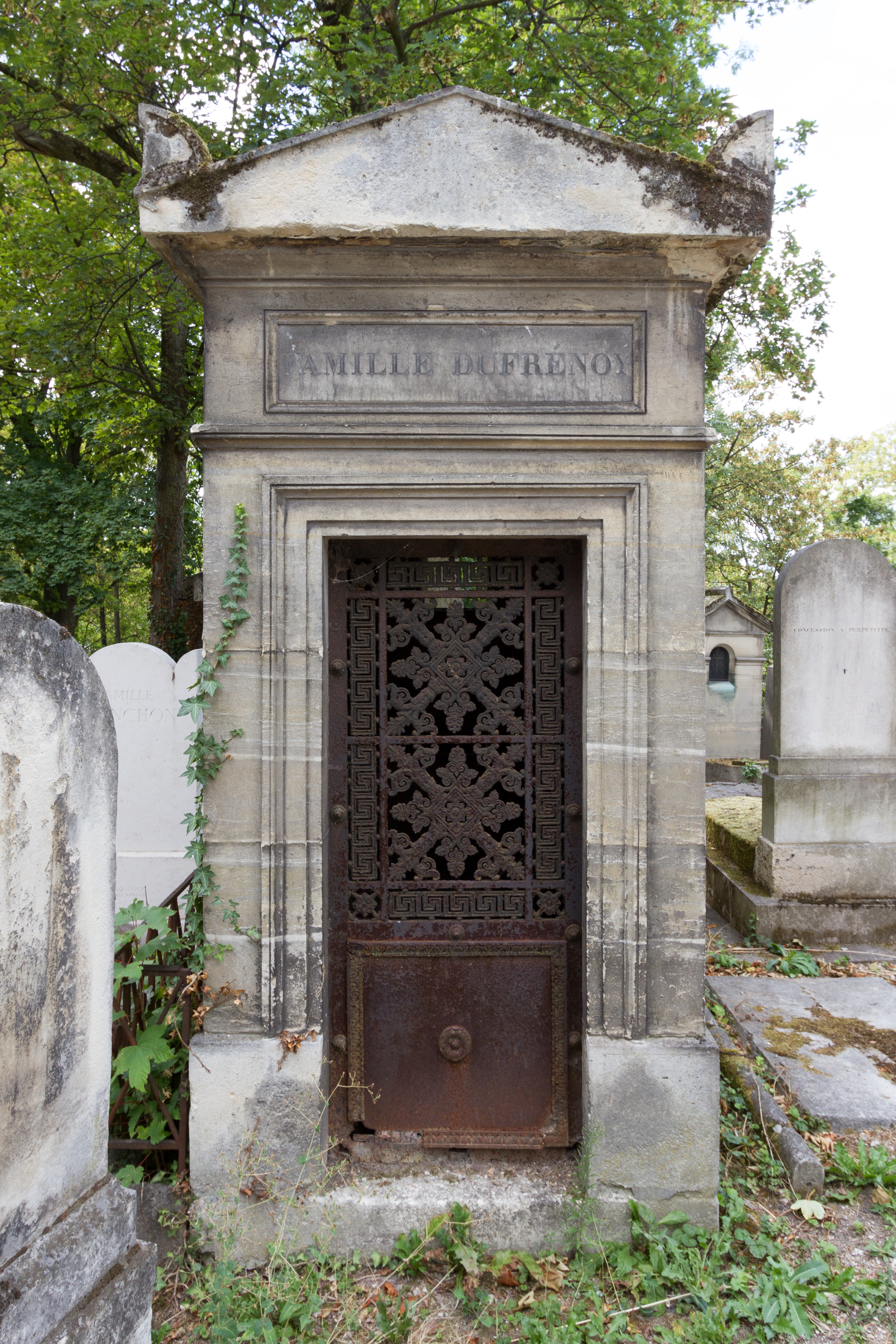
Dufrénoy's tomb

Adélaïde-Gillette Dufrénoy (née Billet) (1765, Nantes – 1825, Paris) was a French poet and woman of letters from Brittany. She is best known for her elegies and was an active part of the literary scene in Paris.

== Biography ==
Madame Dufrénoy was born in Nantes on 3 December 1765, the daughter of Jacques Billet, a jeweller for the Crown of Poland. She had a lavish education and studied at Sœurs Hospitalières de la Roquette, the convent her aunt Mère Saint-Félix oversaw. There, she studied advanced Latin to a proficient enough level to translate the works of Virgil and Horace. When she returned home, her father invited her into his literary circle, where she met for the first time her cousin Jean-Louis Laya, who introduced her to French poetry. She also reconnected with her childhood friend Gabrielle Charpentier, at whose cafe she met her future husband.

At the age of fifteen, she married a rich prosecutor 26 years her senior, Simon Petit-Dufrénoy, at the Châtelet de Paris. They settled at the corner of Quai de l'École and Rue de l'Arbre-Sec, where she was able to open a literary salon, attracting the company of Nicolas Chamfort, Madame de Saint-Huberty, Louis de Fontanes and Fabre d'Églantine, among others. In 1787, her career as a writer started with a small work titled Boutade, à un ami. The same year, she became director of the magazine Le Courrier lyrique et amusant, a post she held until 1789. She also had a few of her poems published in the poetic periodical Almanach des Muses. In 1788, she tried her hand with theatre, and wrote a play, l'Amour exilé des Cieux ("Love Exiled from the Skies").

Her home was set on fire at the start of the French Revolution, leading to the bankruptcy of her husband. They moved to a house on Rue Montmartre and Madame Dufrénoy did menial work for lawyers and businessmen to help bring in money. As Paris became more dangerous, her cousin Laya suggested they relocated to La Fossée, an estate on the edge of the Bondy Forest in Sevran, where her son was born in 1792. They remained there until her husband was given a job by the Consulate in the Court of Alessandria, Italy. As her husband went blind, Madame Dufrénoy accompanied him to the courtroom, where she wrote and read on his behalf. Her presence caused a stir and her husband's position was eventually revoked by Napoleon.

Madame Dufrénoy had written a number of elegies in Italy while she was feeling deep nostalgia for France. When they returned, they lived with her parents and recently widowed sister Sophie at their home in Rue Bourtibourg. There, she returned to writing to support her own family. She started to write erotic poetry, veiled in elegy. In 1807, the first edition of her Elegies was published. Eventually, her friend Louis de Fontanes, at that point a high-ranking politician, convinced Napoleon, Arnault and the Comte de Ségur, to provide her with an allowance in gratitude for her service to the literary world. With the financial support, she was able to re-open her literary salon, which welcomed back old friends like Jean-Nicolas Bouilly and Marceline Desbordes-Valmore and brought in new faces including Pierre-Jean de Béranger, Georges Cuvier and Jacques Arago. In 1814, she was awarded a prize by the Académie Française for her poem Les derniers moments de Bayard. During her career, Madame Dufrénoy was a journalist for Mercure de France and edited for journals including La Minerve littéraire, Almanach des Dames and Hommage aux Demoiselles. She also wrote children's books and translated novels from English into French. In 1812, she sang for the King of Rome and, the following year, she was part of the escort that accompanied Marie Louise of Austria to Cherbourg-en-Cotentin.

Madame Dufrénoy's husband died in 1812. After her mother died in 1824, she moved to a more modest home on Rue des Francs-Bourgeois and died on 7 March 1825.

== Legacy ==
- Sur la mort de Mme Dufrénoy, an ode by Amable Tastu from 1825
- "Ma Lampe", a song by Pierre-Jean de Béranger containing the repeated line Je lis les vers de Dufrenoy ("I'm reading the poems of Dufrénoy").
- There is a street in the Parisian suburb of Sevran called Rue Adélaïde Dufrénoy
- In 1826, Antoine Jay began publishing the multi-volume Œuvres poétiques de Mme Dufrénoy, an annotated collection of Madame Dufrénoy's poems

== Selected works ==
- Cabinet du petit naturaliste (1810–1819), Chez A. Rigaud: Paris
- La femme auteur, ou Les inconvénients de la célébrité (1812), Chez F. Béchet: Paris
- L'Anniversaire de la naissance du Roi de Rome (1812), P. Didot: Paris
- Élégies, suivies de poésies diverses, par Mme Dufrénoy (1813), A. Eymery: Paris
- Le Tour du monde, ou, Tableau géographique et historique : de tous les peuples de la terre (1814), Chez A. Rigaud: Paris
- L'Hymne des Français... à S. A. R. la duchesse d'Angoulême, lors de son entrée à Paris (1814), Chez Brasseur Ainé: Paris
- Étrennes à ma fille, ou Soirées amusantes de la jeunesse (1816), A. Eymery: Paris
- L'Enfance éclairée, ou les Vertus et les vices, par Mme Dufrénoy (1816), A. Eymery: Paris
- Biographie des jeunes demoiselles ou vies des femmes célèbres depuis les hébreux jusqu'à nos jours (1816), A. Eymery: Paris
- Petite Encyclopédie de l'enfance, ou, Leçons élémentaires de grammaire, de géographie, de mythologie, d'histoire ancienne et moderne, d'histoire des religions, d'arithmétique et mathematique, de physique, d'histoire naturelle, des arts et métiers (1817), Chez A. Rigaud: Paris
- Plaintes d'une jeune Israélite sur la destruction de Jérusalem, élégie (1817), A. Eymery: Paris
- Hommage aux demoiselles (1818), Chez Le Fuel: Paris
- Les Françaises, nouvelles (1818), A. Eymery: Paris
- La Petite ménagère, ou l'Éducation maternelle (1821-1822), A. Eymery: Paris
- Abécédaire des petits gourmands (1822), Lefuel: Paris
- La Convalescence, élégie (1823), J. Tastu: Paris
- Beautés de l'histoire de la Grèce moderne, ou Récit des faits mémorables des Hellènes depuis 1770 jusqu'à ce jour (1825), A. Eymery: Paris
- Les Conversations maternelles (1826), A. Eymery: Paris (posthumous)
- Nouvel Abécédaire des petits gourmands (c. 1850), published posthumously by J. Langlumé; lithographs sometimes attributed to Victor Adam
- Faits historiques et moraux (1877), Chez A. Rigaud: Paris (posthumous)
