= Constance Mayer =

French painter (1775–1821)

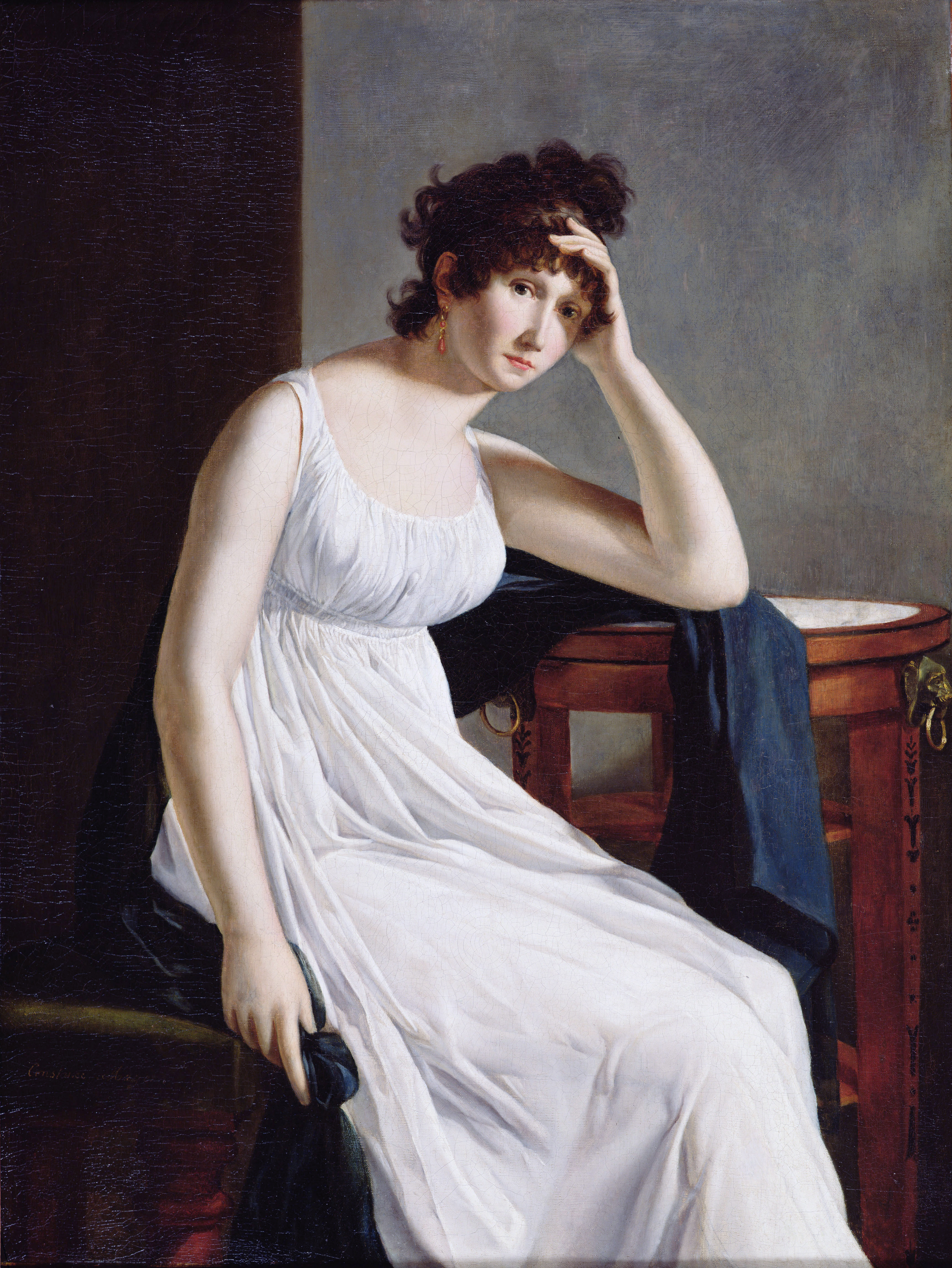
- Constance Mayer, "Self-Portrait," 1799, oil on canvas, 110 x 85 cm, bibliothèque et villa Marmottan, inv. 1970–1952
- Born: Marie-Françoise Constance Mayer La Martinière; 9 March 1775; Chauny, Picardy, France
- Died: 26 May 1821 (aged 46); Paris, France
- Occupation: Painter
- Movement: Neoclassicism

Marie-Françoise Constance Mayer La Martinière (9 March 1775 – 26 May 1821) was a French painter of portraits, allegorical subjects, miniatures and genre works. She had "a brilliant but bitter career."

== Biography ==
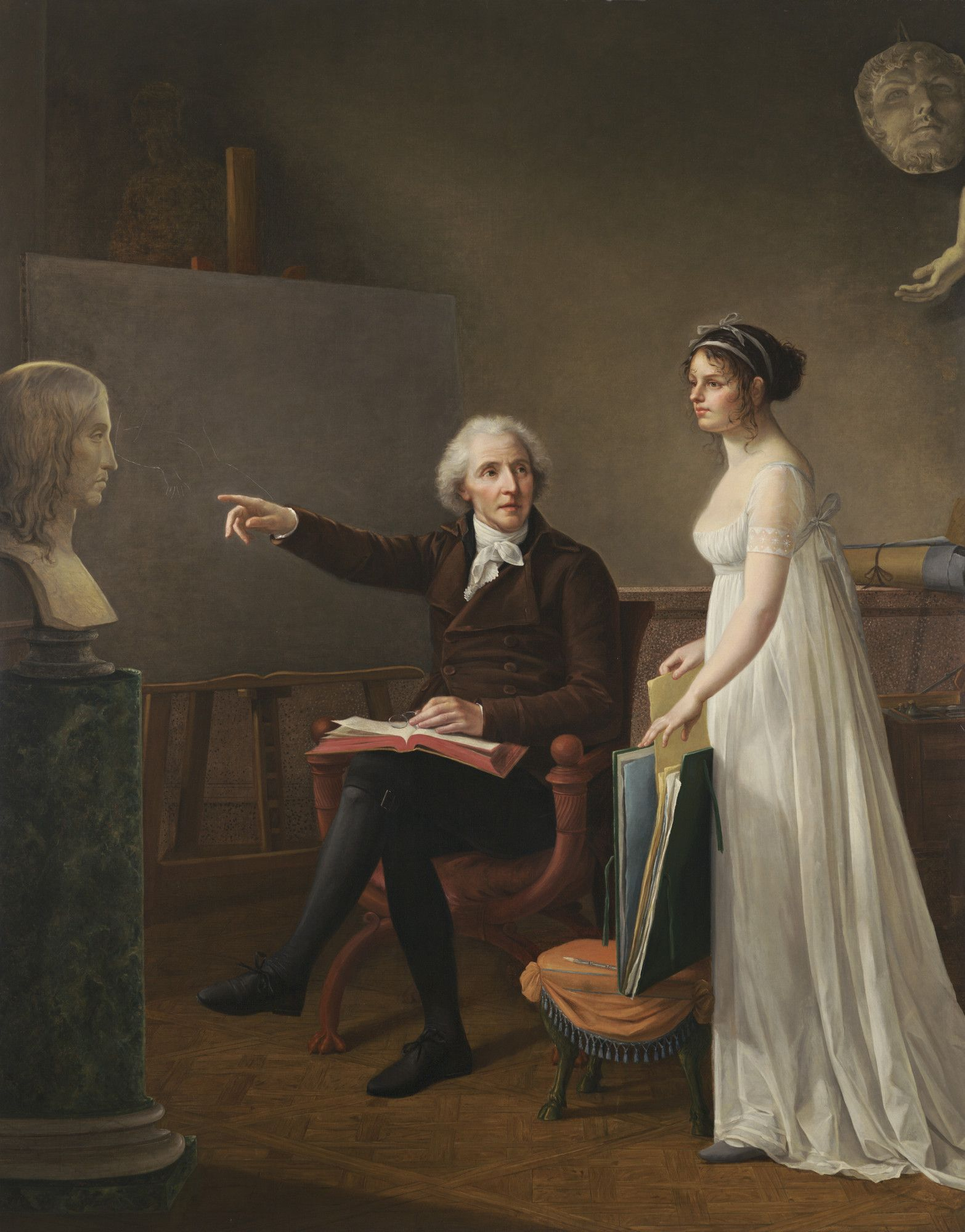
Self-Portrait with Artist's Father: He Points to a Bust of Raphael, Inviting Her to Take This Celebrated Painter as a Model, oil on canvas, 1801, Wadsworth Atheneum, Hartford, Connecticut

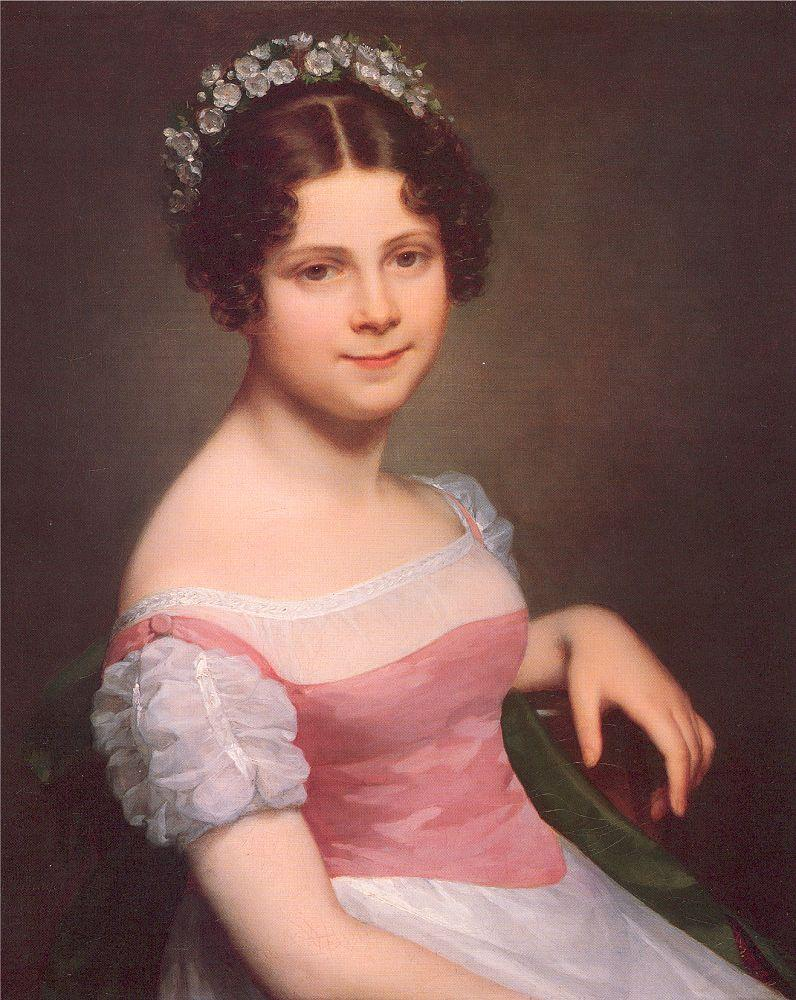
Sophie Fanny Lordon

Constance Mayer was the daughter of a successful government official.

Mayer painted genre scenes and portraits in her early 20s. Having studied with Joseph-Benoît Suvée and Jean-Baptiste Greuze, she adopted a style of soft brush strokes and made paintings of sentimental scenes like those of her instructors. Of Greuze, for instance, his daughters said that "he painted virtue, friendship and innocence, and his soul breathes through his pictures" although more objective opinions were that he painted wounded and vulnerable subjects.

Following the French Revolution's Reign of Terror, society settled into a calmer lifestyle in which miniature and portrait paintings became popular. Mayer painted portraits of women and children, family scenes, self-portraits and miniatures of her father. She attained a degree of success, exhibited Self-Portrait of Citizenness Mayer Pointing to a Sketch for a Portrait of Her Mother, and exhibited at every salon thereafter. At the 1801 salon, she exhibited Self-Portrait with Artist's Father: He Points to a Bust of Raphael, Inviting Her to Take This Celebrated Painter as a Model. Sensitive to the viewpoint of women artists, Mayer had her work presented as the student of Greuze and Suvee so that they would be more acceptable to the public. She worked in Jacques-Louis David's studio in 1801 and adopted a direct and simple style under his tutelage, but still depicted sentimental scenes.

She studied with Pierre-Paul Prud'hon beginning in 1802, (Note: Spencer stated that she studied with Prud'hon following Greuze's death (1805).) but they did not have the typical pupil-master relationship. In many ways, there were more like peers. They had both exhibited at the salon and unlike Prud'hon, she had received a better education in art, and he was known for his talent in drawing, particularly complex historic compositions.

During the time when Prud'hon was painting the portrait of Empress Josephine, his wife, in a fit of jealousy, claimed that he was having an affair with the empress. Prud'hon's wife was held in an asylum and Prud'hon was given custody of their children.

After the artist Prud'hon had separated from his wife, the Emperor Napoleon gave him an apartment in the Sorbonne. At about the same time (c. 1803), Napoléon, who had purchased two of her paintings, gave Mayer an apartment there too. There she served as Prud'hon's assistant, raised his five children and was known as his "favorite pupil."

After 1804 her works of art were greatly influenced by Prud'hon and subsequently received greater acclaim for her paintings. This situation lasted until 1821 or 1822 when "she heard it announced that the artist (Prud'hon) must leave the Sorbonne to the claims of the church.".

Prud'hon's wife died and Mayer had expected that she would marry him. Prone to depression throughout her life, this prompted a crisis in Mayer's life, "when Prud'hon refused to acknowledge her assistance and marry her after the many years she had served as his assistant and his housekeeper", she then seized "the artist's razor, drew it across her throat."

Prud'hon organized a retrospective of her works the following year but, distressed by her death, died in 1823.

They are buried together in Paris's Père Lachaise cemetery.

== Controversy ==
As was often the case with women artists who were associated with better known male artists, there were claims made that she did not produce all the work attributed to her and because of her long relationship with Prud'hon, it is still not well understood exactly what he did and what she did. This confusion is in large part due to the fact that the two artists collaborated on several works: he sketched the design and she made the paintings. (Note: During this time it was not unusual for pupils to work on a small portion of their instructor's paintings.) Many were exhibited under her name, but when the works became part of public collections they were attributed to Prud'hon. For instance, Venus and Cupid sleeping now attributed to Mayer was initially attributed in the Wallace Collection to Prud'hon.

== Legacy ==
Like Pauline Auzou, Marguerite Gérard, Antoinette Haudebourt-Lescot and Marie-Denise Villers, Mayer was one of the successful women artists following the French Revolution:

Despite overt exclusion of women artists from the institutions governing their profession, women artists nevertheless made progress, as a group and as individuals, in the years following the French Revolution.

— Louise Nochlin, Women Artists: 1550-1950 catalog

Her work was exhibited by the National Museum of Women of the Arts in "An Imperial Collection: Women Artists from the State Hermitage Museum."

== Gallery ==
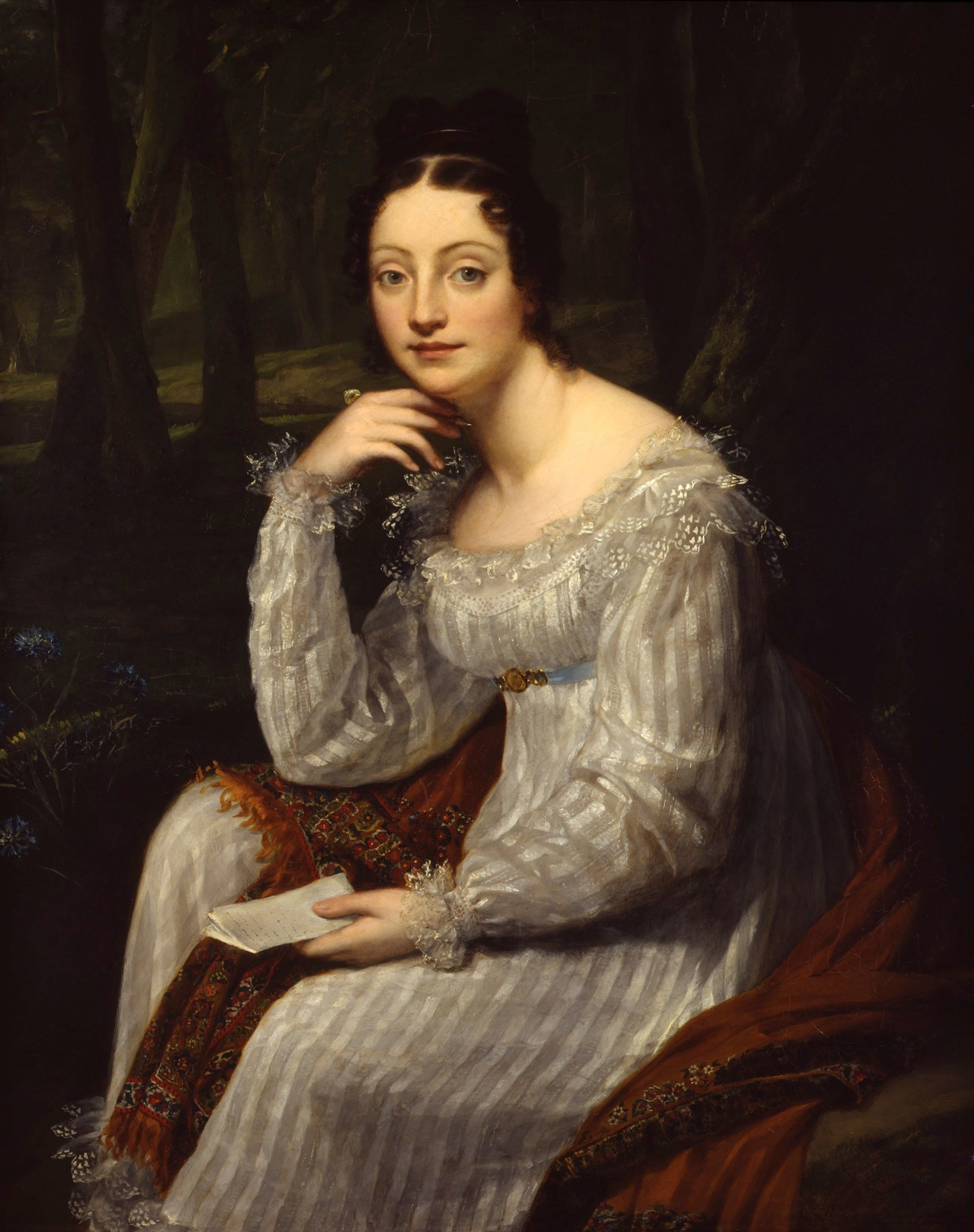
Amable Tastu, oil on canvas, Musée de Metz, France

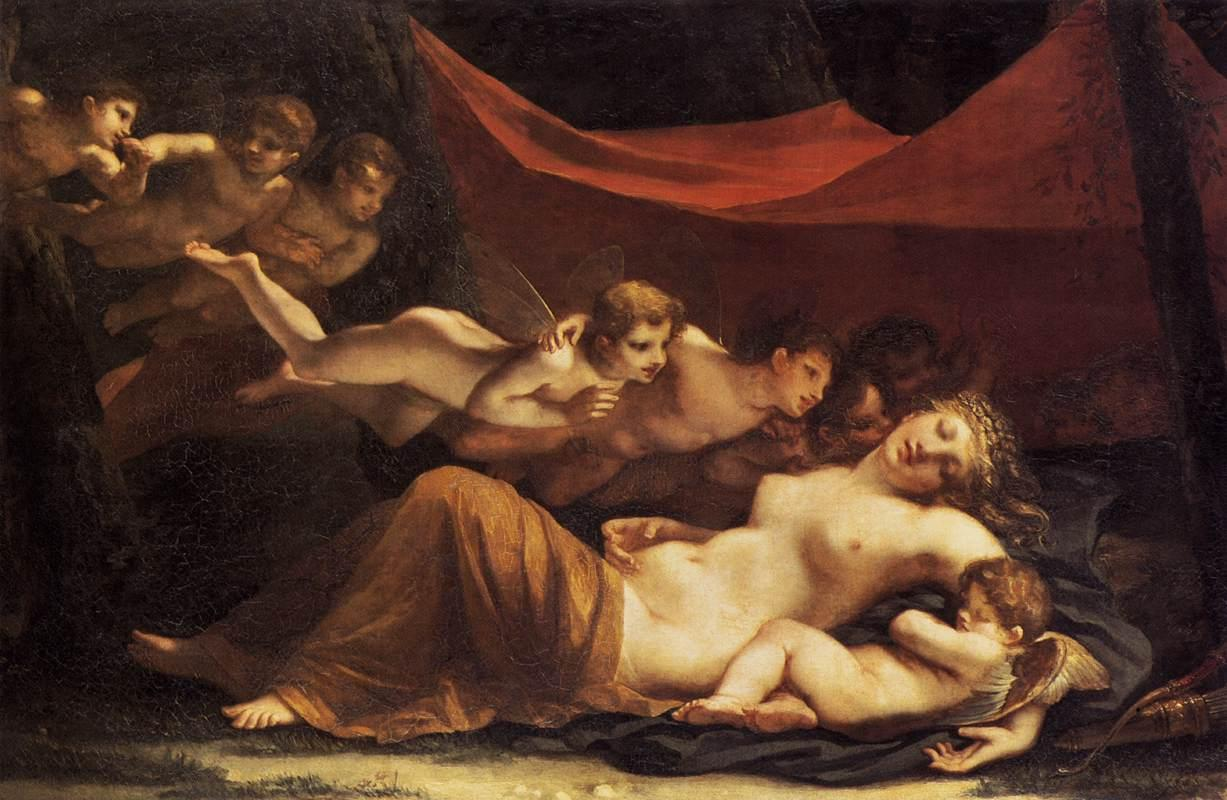
Venus and Cupid sleeping, Wallace Collection, London

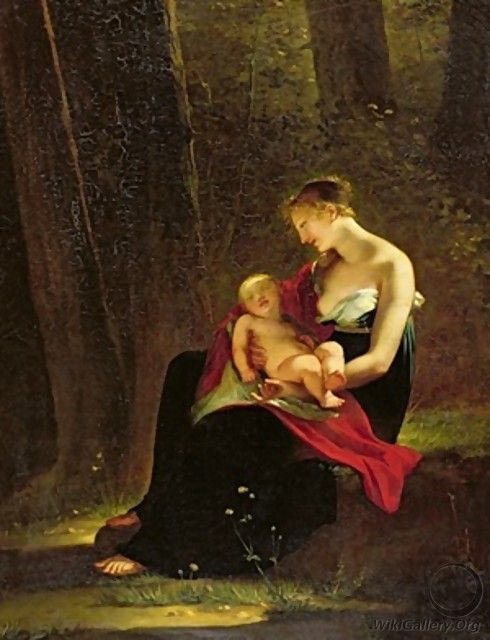
L'heureuse mère (The Happy Mother), Musée du Louvre, Paris

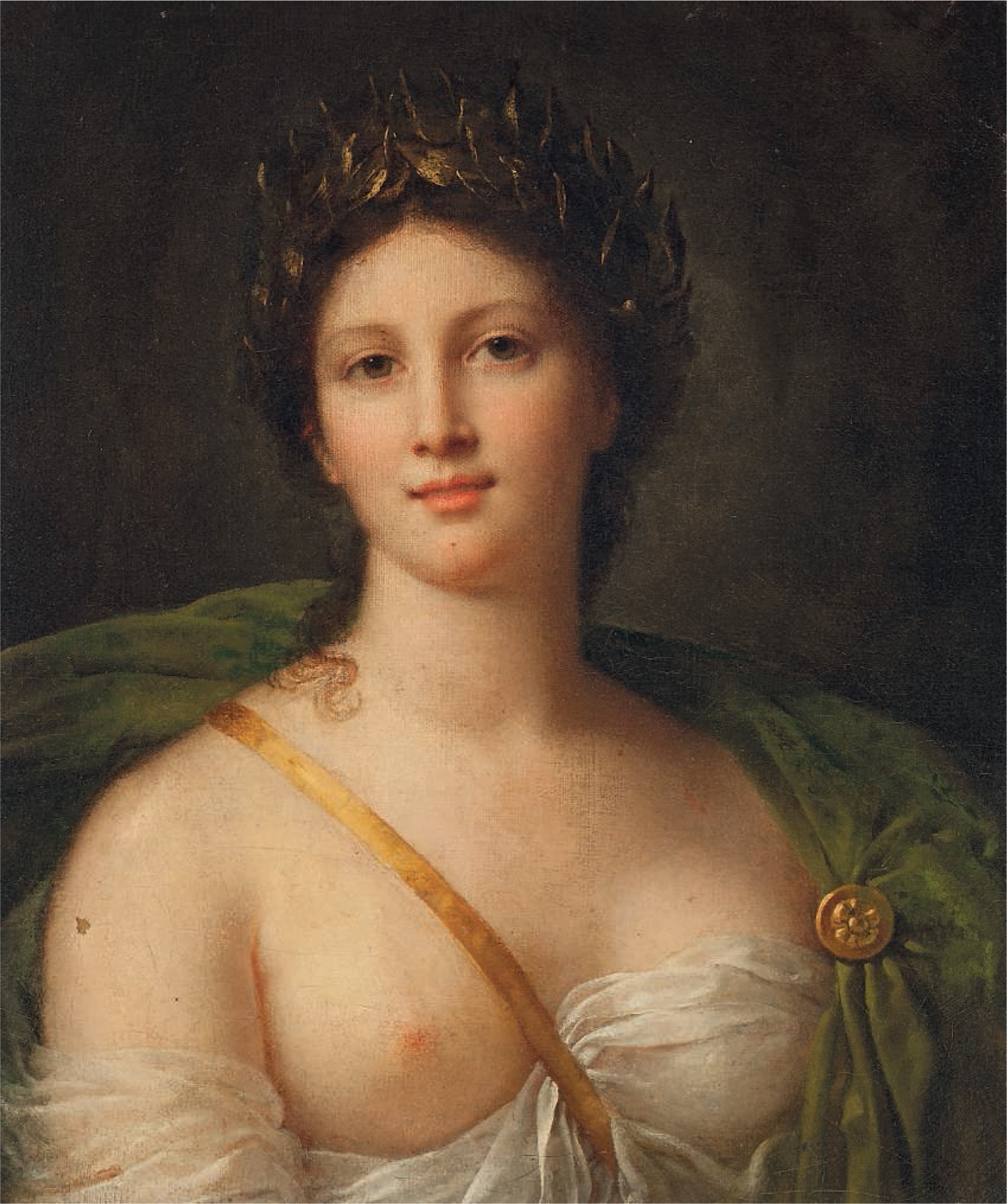
Muse
