= Victor Adam =

French painter (1801–1866)

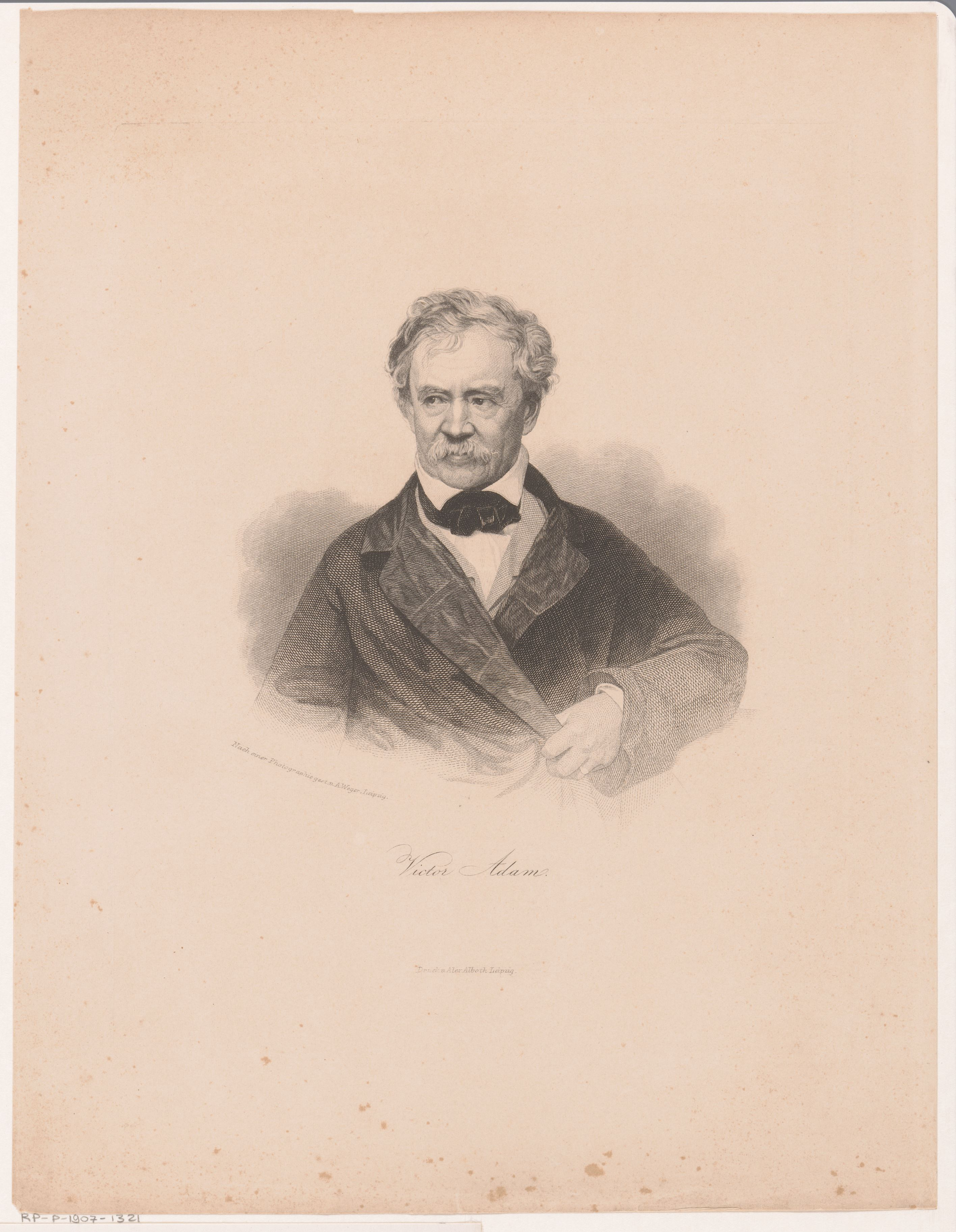
Victor Adam

Jean Victor Adam (28 January 1801 – 30 December 1866) was a French painter and lithographer.

== Life ==
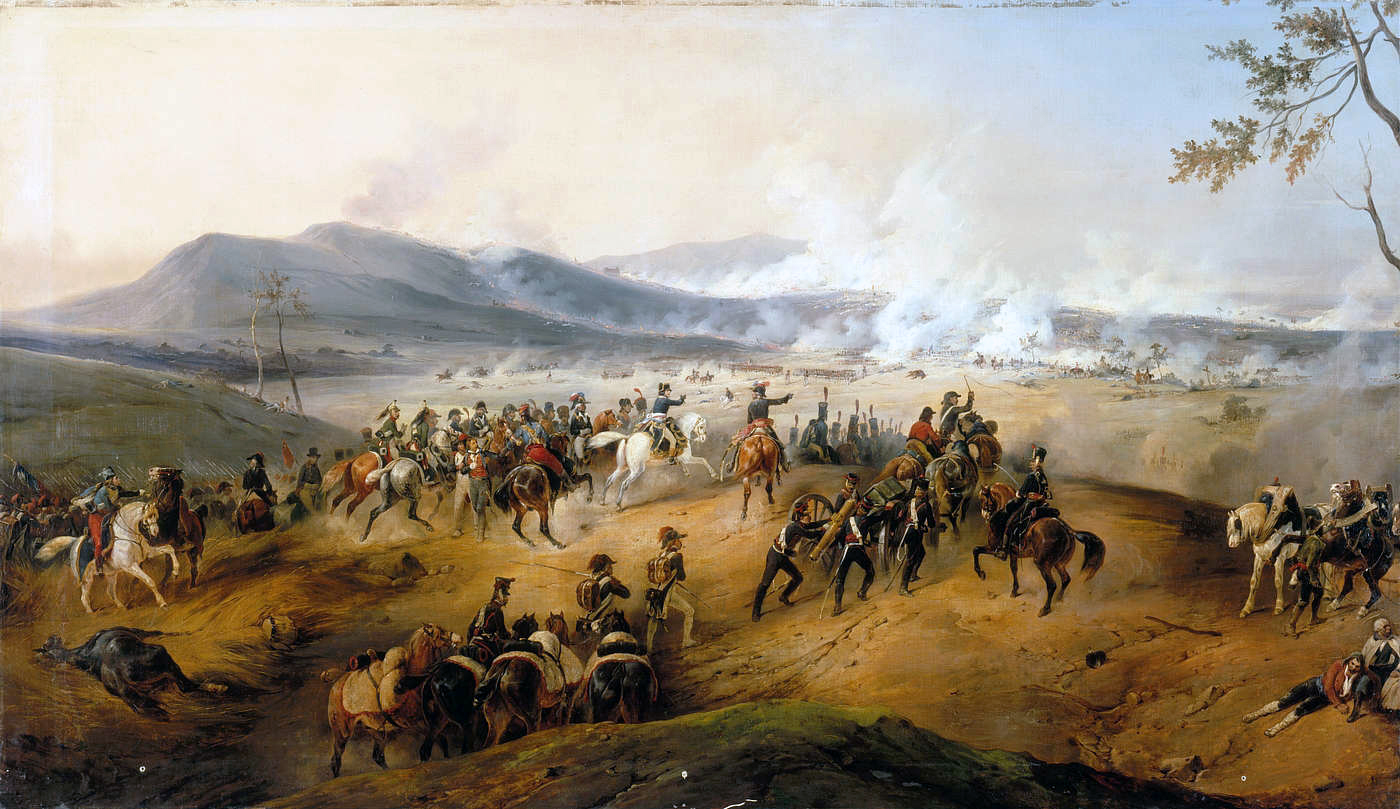
Battle of Castiglione, painted in 1836, now at the Musée national du Château de Versailles

Adam was born in Paris in 1801, the son of Jean Adam, an engraver. He studied at the École des Beaux-Arts in 1814–18, and also in the ateliers of Meynier and Régnault.

In 1819 he exhibited Herminia succouring Tancred. He was almost immediately afterwards employed to paint various subjects for the Museum at Versailles, including The Entry of the French into Mainz, The Battle of Varroux, The Taking of Menin, The Battle of Castiglione, The Passage of the Cluse, The Battle of Montebello and The Capitulation of Meiningen the last three in collaboration with Jean Alaux.

He continued to exhibit until 1838, his subjects including Henry IV., after the Battle of Coutras, Trait of Kindness in the Duke de Berri, The Postillion, The Vivandiere, The Road to Poissy, The Return from the Chase, Horse-fair at Caen, and many others. He then disappeared from public view until 1846, when he exhibited some lithographs, dedicating himself to the medium from then on. In this line he produced a lithographic album, Views in the Environs of Paris, Studies of Animals for an edition of Buffon, etc. He won a gold medal in 1824, a second class medal in 1836, besides several others from Lille, Douai, and other cities. He died at Viroflay in 1867.
