= Justice and Divine Vengeance Pursuing Crime =

Painting by Pierre-Paul Prud'hon

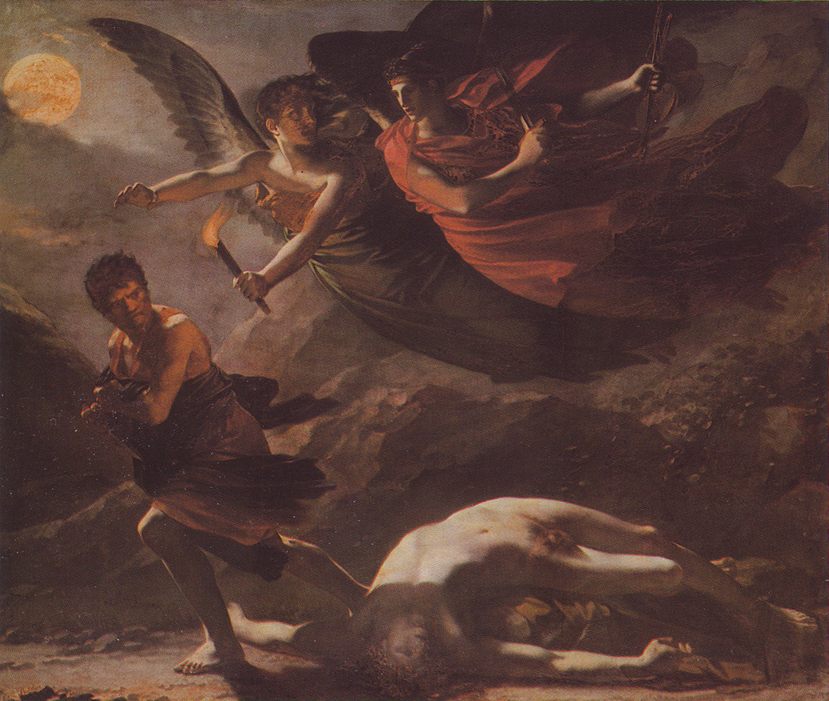
- Artist: Pierre-Paul Prud'hon
- Year: 1804-1808
- Medium: Oil on canvas
- Dimensions: 243 cm × 292 cm (96 in × 115 in)
- Location: Louvre, Paris

Justice and Divine Vengeance Pursuing Crime is an oil on canvas painting by French artist Pierre-Paul Prud'hon, from 1804-1808. It was commissioned by Nicolas Frochot, préfet de la Seine for the criminal tribunal hall (equivalent of today's assizes court) at the Palais de Justice, in Paris. It is now in the Louvre. A replica commissioned from the painter by the very rich Italian art lover Gian Battista Sommariva, a major collector of French works - it is lighter in touch and colouring than the Louvre work.

== History ==
It shows the ancient Greek goddesses Themis (justice) and Nemesis (divine vengeance) with personifications of Crime and Victims of Crime. All but the victim are shown in movement. An oil sketch for the work was completed in 1806 and the full work was exhibited at the Paris Salon two years later at the Salon of 1808 - on the latter occasion Napoleon I decorated Prud'hon with the Légion d'honneur.

== Description ==
Three of the four figures in the painting are in motion, while the fourth lies motionless on the ground. They are illuminated by moonlight, lending a rather dark atmosphere to the scene. Justice and Divine Vengeance are depicted as large winged figures, united in their pursuit of Crime — represented by a man fleeing on foot before them.

Justice, serene in appearance, holds a folded pair of scales — signifying that judgment has been passed — and brandishes a sword to strike the fleeing man. In contrast, the flowing hair and open mouth of Divine Vengeance — poised to seize the culprit while holding a torch in one hand —convey intense rage.

Crime is depicted as a middle-aged man clutching a dagger and a purse, glancing back as he runs. The victim is portrayed as a young man lying naked on the ground with arms outstretched, an image that evokes vulnerability and innocence.

== In popular culture ==
In The Guermantes Way, the third volume of Marcel Proust's novel In Search of Lost Time, the narrator incorrectly refers to the painting as "Justice Shedding Light on Crime," after his housekeeper catches him in bed with a girl while illuminating them with a lamp.
