= Alfred-Henri-Amand Mame =

French printer and publisher

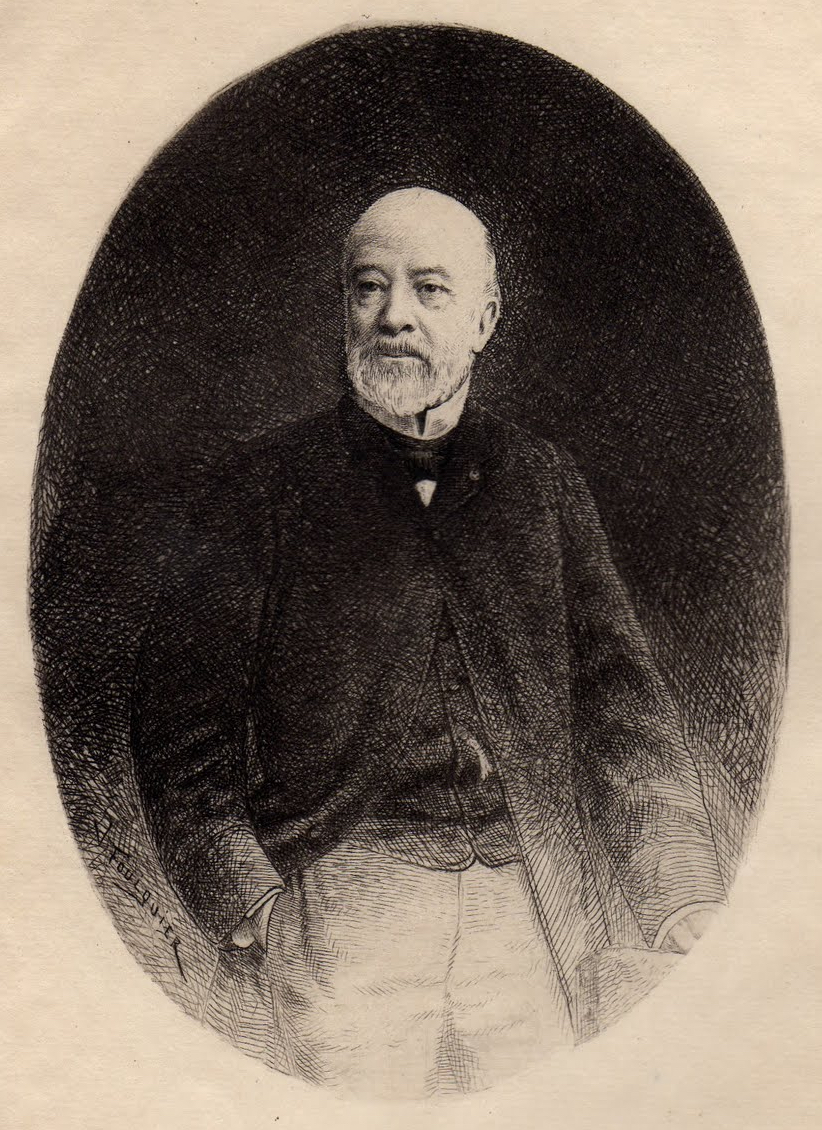
Alfred Mame.

Alfred-Henry-Armand Mame (b. at Tours, 17 August 1811; d. at Tours, 12 April 1893) was a French printer and publisher.

== Mame, publishers ==
The founder of the Mame firm, Charles Mame, printed two newspapers at Angers in the last quarter of the eighteenth century; General Hoche had at one time hoped to marry his daughter. His eldest son, bookseller and publisher in Paris, under the First Empire, edited Chateaubriand's famous opuscule, "Buonaparte et les Bourbons", also Madame de Staël's works; and the persecutions directed against these books by the Napoleonic police caused the financial ruin of the editor. But the third son, Amand Mame, came to Tours and founded there a firm which, under the management of Alfred Mame, son of Amand, was destined to become very important.

Paul Mame (1833–1903), a son of Alfred, was the head of the firm until 1900.

== Business model ==
After having edited, together with his cousin Ernest Mame, from 1833 to 1845, some classics and a few devotional books, Alfred conceived and carried out, for the first time, the idea of uniting in the same publishing house, a certain number of workshops, grouping all the industries connected with the making of books: printing, binding, selling, and forwarding. By analogy with the great ironworks of Le Creusot, the Mame firm has been called the literary "Creusot".

Mame was also one of the principal owners of the paper-mills of La Haye-Descartes; and it could thus be said that a book, from the time when the rags are transformed into paper up to the moment when the final binding is put on, passed through a succession of workers, all of whom were connected with Mame. Daily, as early as 1865, this publishing house brought out from three to four thousand kilograms of books; it employed seven hundred workers within and from four hundred to five hundred outside.

Inspired by the social Catholic ideal, Alfred Mame established for his employees a pension fund for those over sixty, wholly maintained by the firm. He opened schools, which caused him to receive one of the ten thousand francs awards reserved for the "établissements modèles où régnaient au plus haut degré l'harmonie sociale et le bien-être des ouvriers". In 1874 Mame organized a system by which his working-men shared in the profits of the firm.

== Books ==
It put into circulation books of devotion, and published the Bibliothèque de la jeunesse chrétienne. La Touraine was exhibited at the Universal Exhibition of 1855, and was in its day one of the finest of illustrated books. There were the Bible with illustrations from Gustave Doré; Vétault's Charlemagne; Wallon's St. Louis; the Chefs d'oeuvres de la langue française. Quantin, the publisher, calculated that, in 1883, the Mame publishing-house issued yearly six million volumes, of which three million were bound.

== Politics ==
At one time he tried but unsuccessfully to enter political life; at the election of 14 Oct., 1877, he presented himself in the first district of Tours as candidate for the Chamber of Deputies, on the conservative side, against Belle, the republican deputy who had founded in Tours the first lay school for girls. Mame was defeated, having 7456 votes, against 12,006 obtained by Belle.
