= Pierre-Paul Prud'hon =

French painter (1758–1823)

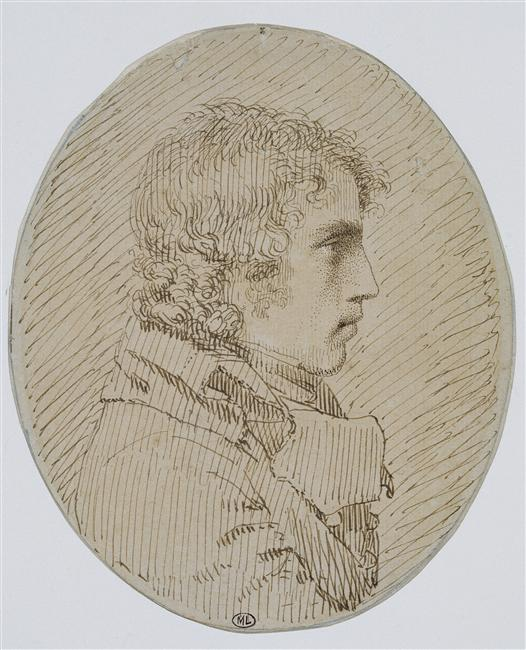
- Prud'hon's only known self-portrait, c. 1788–1790
- Born: 4 April 1758; Cluny, Saône-et-Loire, France
- Died: 16 February 1823 (aged 64); Paris, France
- Known for: Painting, drawing
- Notable work: Madame Georges Anthony and Her Two Sons
- Movement: Neoclassicism, Romanticism

Signature
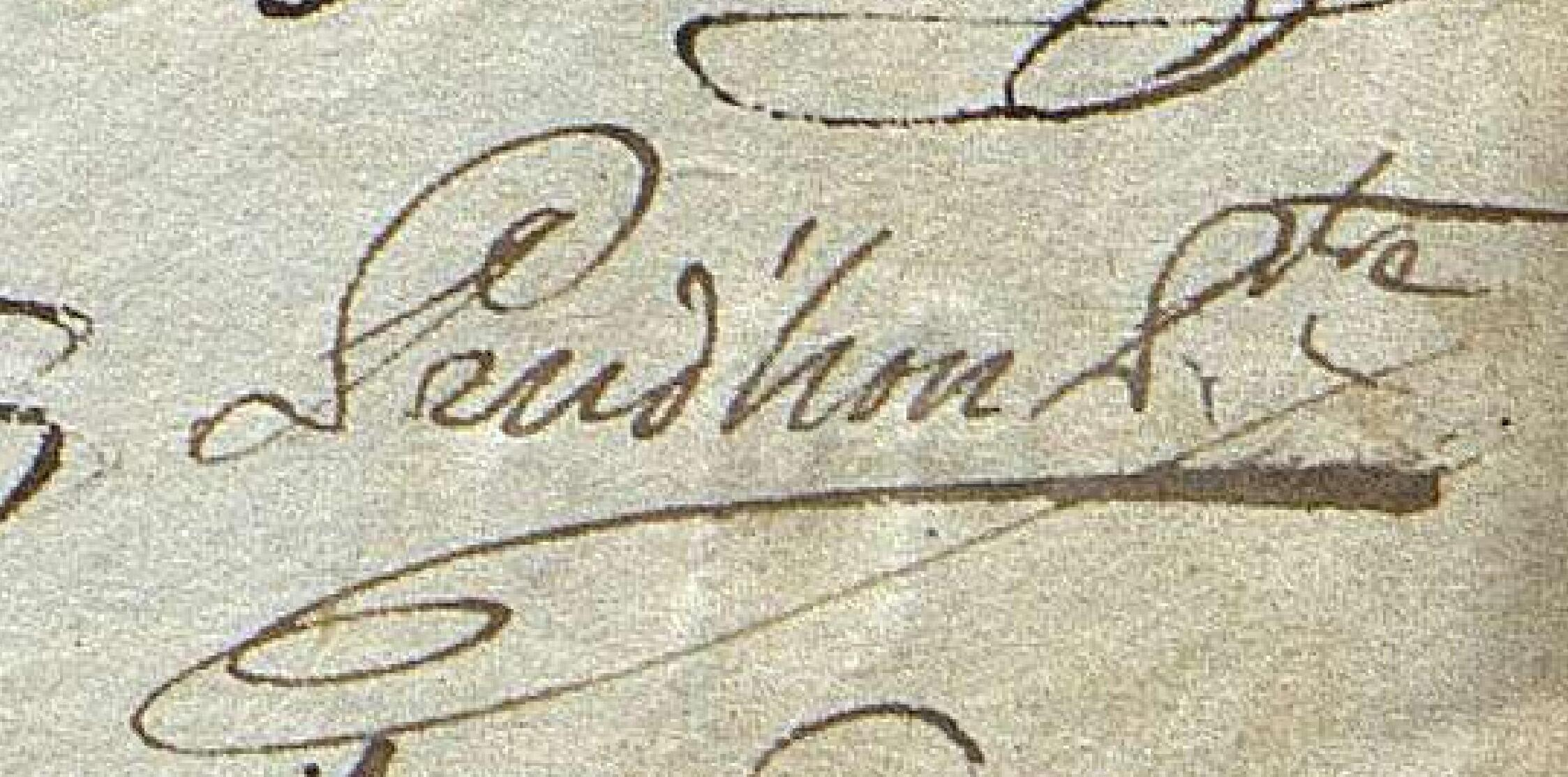

Pierre-Paul Prud'hon (French: [pjɛʁ pɔl pʁydɔ̃]; 4 April 1758 – 16 February 16, 1823) was a French Neo-classical painter and draughtsman best known in his own time for his allegorical paintings and portraits, now for his drawings. He painted a portrait of Napoleon's wife Empress Josephine.

He was an early influence on Théodore Géricault. After 1803 he worked so closely with artist Constance Mayer on many paintings, that it is almost impossible to tell where the contribution of one ends and the other begins.

== Biography ==
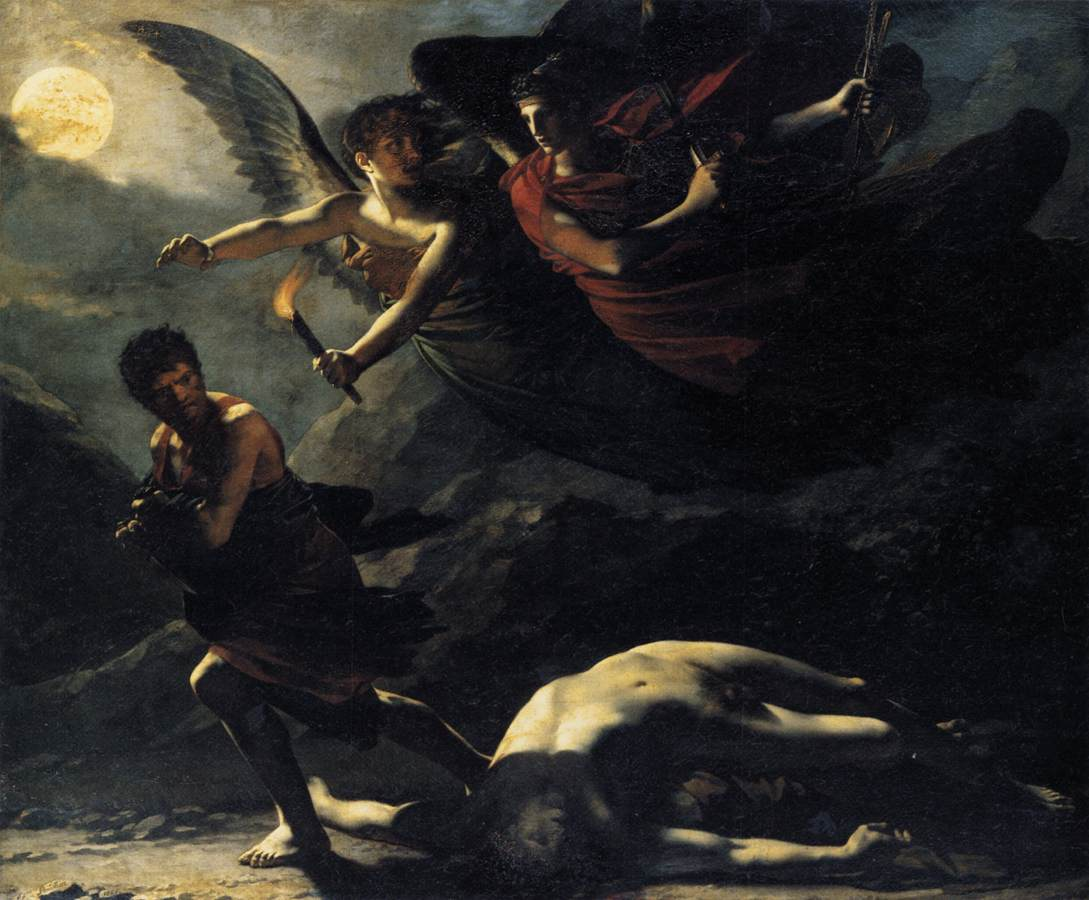
Justice and Divine Vengeance Pursuing Crime, 1808. The darkness and the sprawling naked figure anticipate Théodore Géricault's painting The Raft of the Medusa.

Pierre-Paul Prud'hon was born in Cluny, Saône-et-Loire, France. He received his artistic training in the French provinces He married Jeanne Pennet in 1778 in Cluny. They had six children. He went to Italy when he was twenty-six years old to continue his education.

In Paris he became an enthusiastic supporter of the Revolution and made drawings of mythological and republican allegories which were engraved and published by his friend Jacques-Louis Copia.

Prud'hon made some portraits during this period including one of Louis de Saint-Just, one of the key figures in the Reign of Terror.

At the fall of Robespierre, in 1794, Prud'hon found it prudent to leave Paris. He spent two years in Franche-Comte, painting portraits and making book illustrations.

In 1796, it was safe to return to Paris. He decorated rooms in some private mansions with allegories of art, philosophy, wealth, and pleasure.

In 1802 several artists, including Prud'hon received studios in the Sorbonne.

In 1803, Constance Mayer, already an accomplished artist, entered Prud'hon's studio as a student. She soon became his close collaborator and mistress. She tried to replace the absent mother of his children. His wife had been separated from him and confined to an insane asylum.

Prud'hon and Mayer worked very well as a team. He produced plans and sketches for an allegory or literary subject and she patiently rendered the final painting. Often the paintings were exhibited as her work. This arrangement left him time for portraits and other work.

Prud'hon's Portrait of Empress Josephine shows her alone in the garden of her home, Malmaison. After the divorce of Napoleon and Josephine, he was also employed by Napoleon's second wife Marie-Louise. He taught her drawing and designed furniture. His commission for a portrait of Marie-Louise was given to François Gérard and Robert Lefèvre because of Prud'hon's meticulous and time consuming working method.

He was appreciated by other artists and writers, including Stendhal, Delacroix, Millet and Baudelaire, for his chiaroscuro and convincing realism. He painted Crucifixion (1822) for St. Etienne's Cathedral in Metz; it now hangs in the Louvre.

The young Théodore Géricault had painted copies of work by Prud'hon, whose "thunderously tragic pictures" include his masterpiece, Justice and Divine Vengeance Pursuing Crime, where oppressive darkness and the compositional base of a naked, sprawled corpse obviously anticipate Géricault's painting The Raft of the Medusa.

== Gallery ==
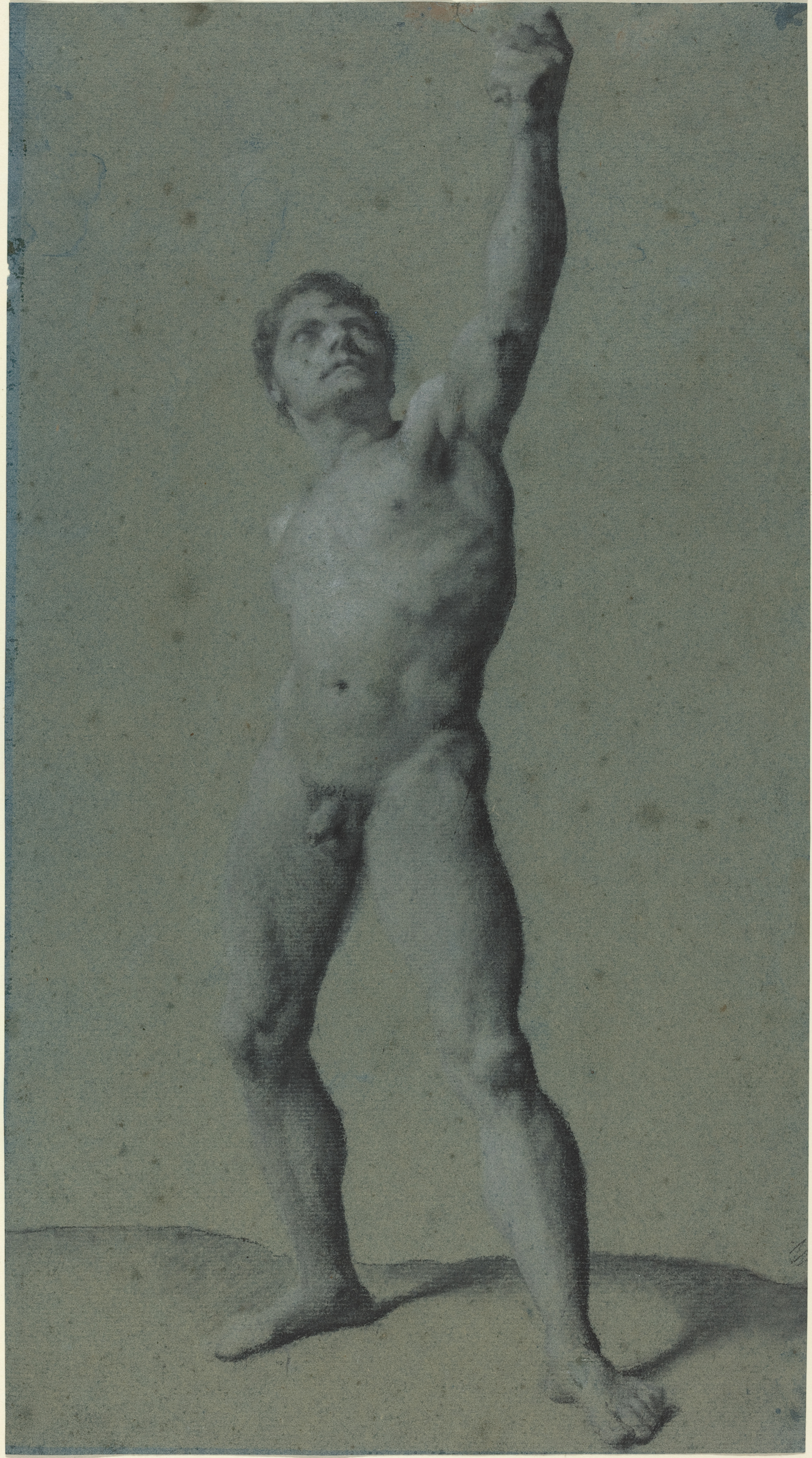
Male Nude Study, National Gallery of Art

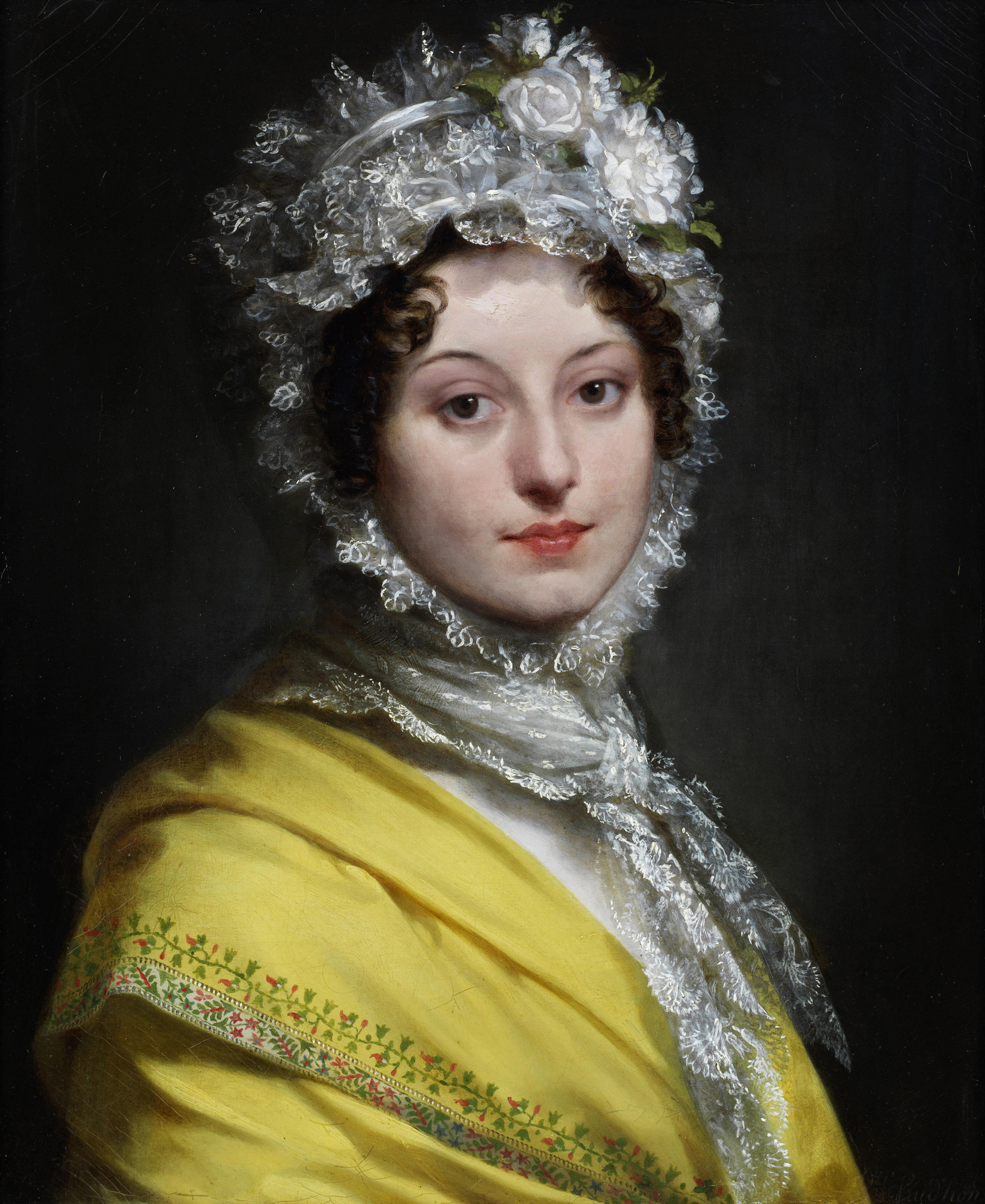
Louise Antoinette Lannes, Duchess of Montebello

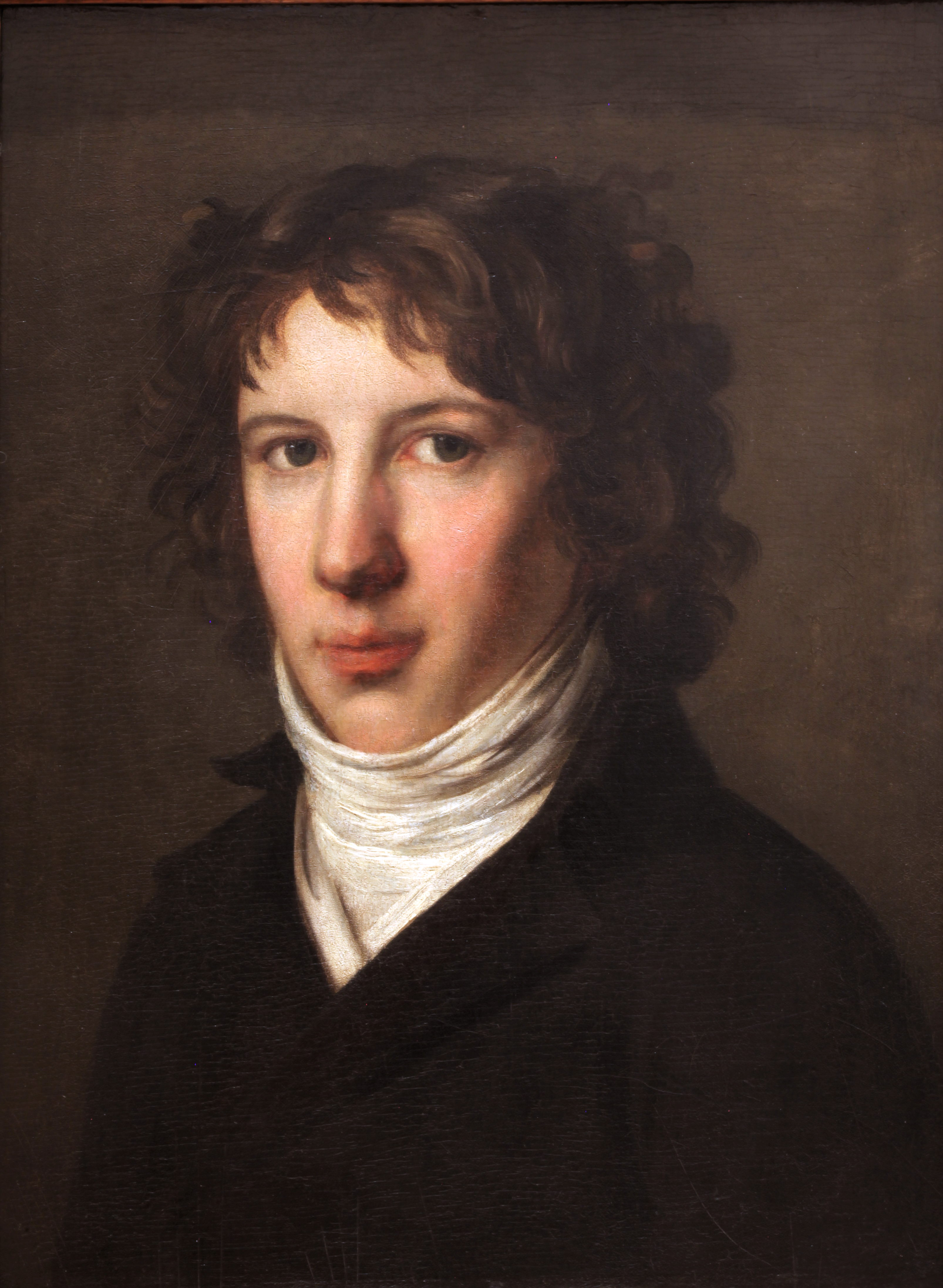
Portrait of Louis de Saint-Just, 1793

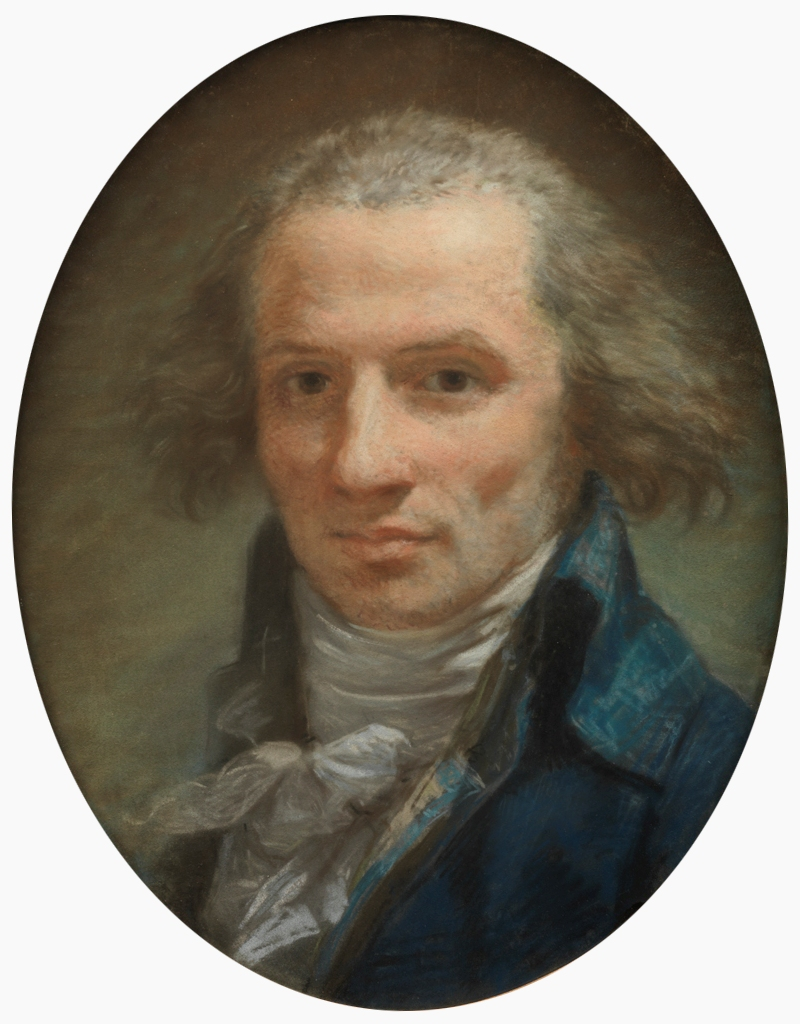
Nicolas Perchet, 1795, Princeton University Art Museum

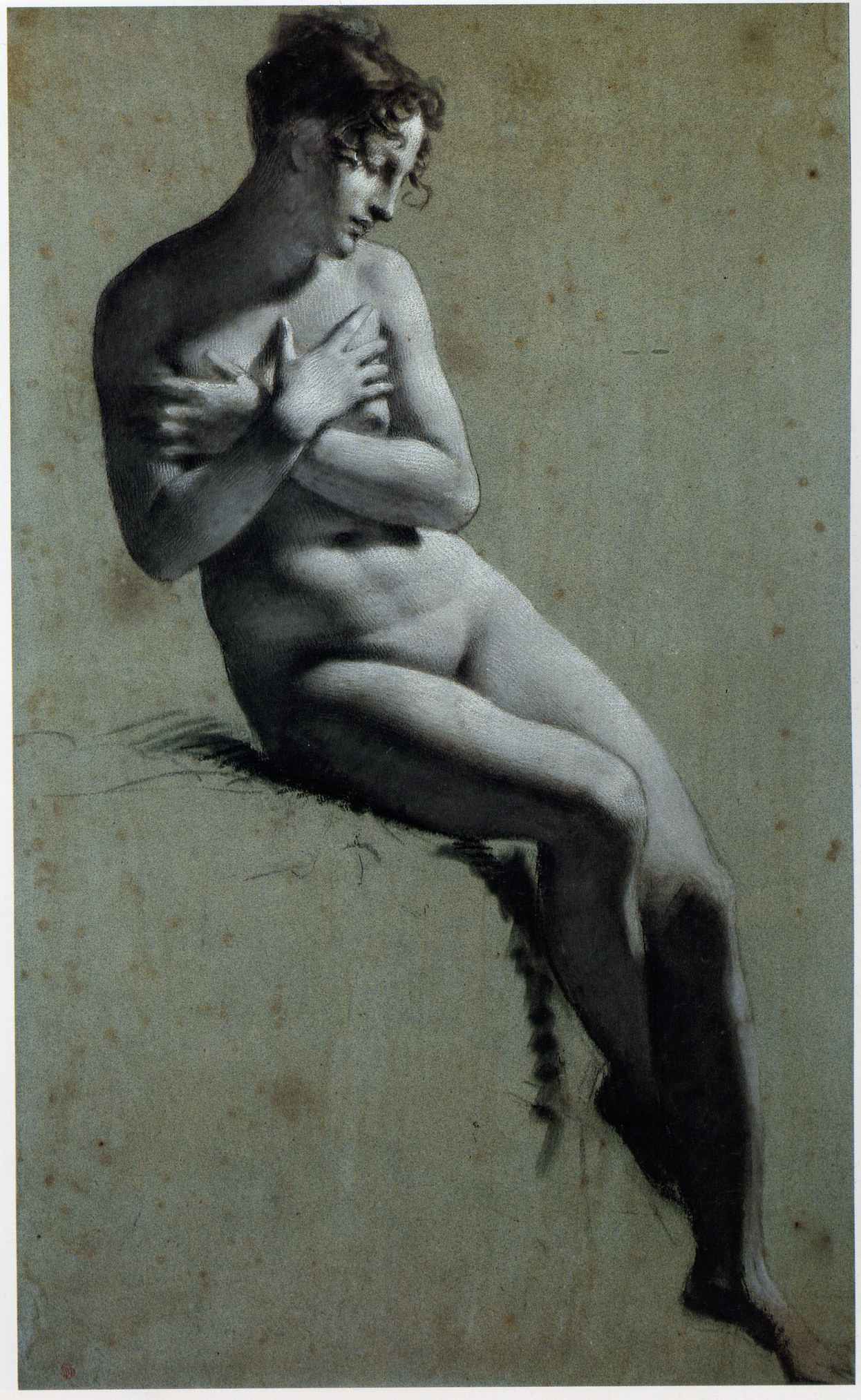
Female Nude, 1800

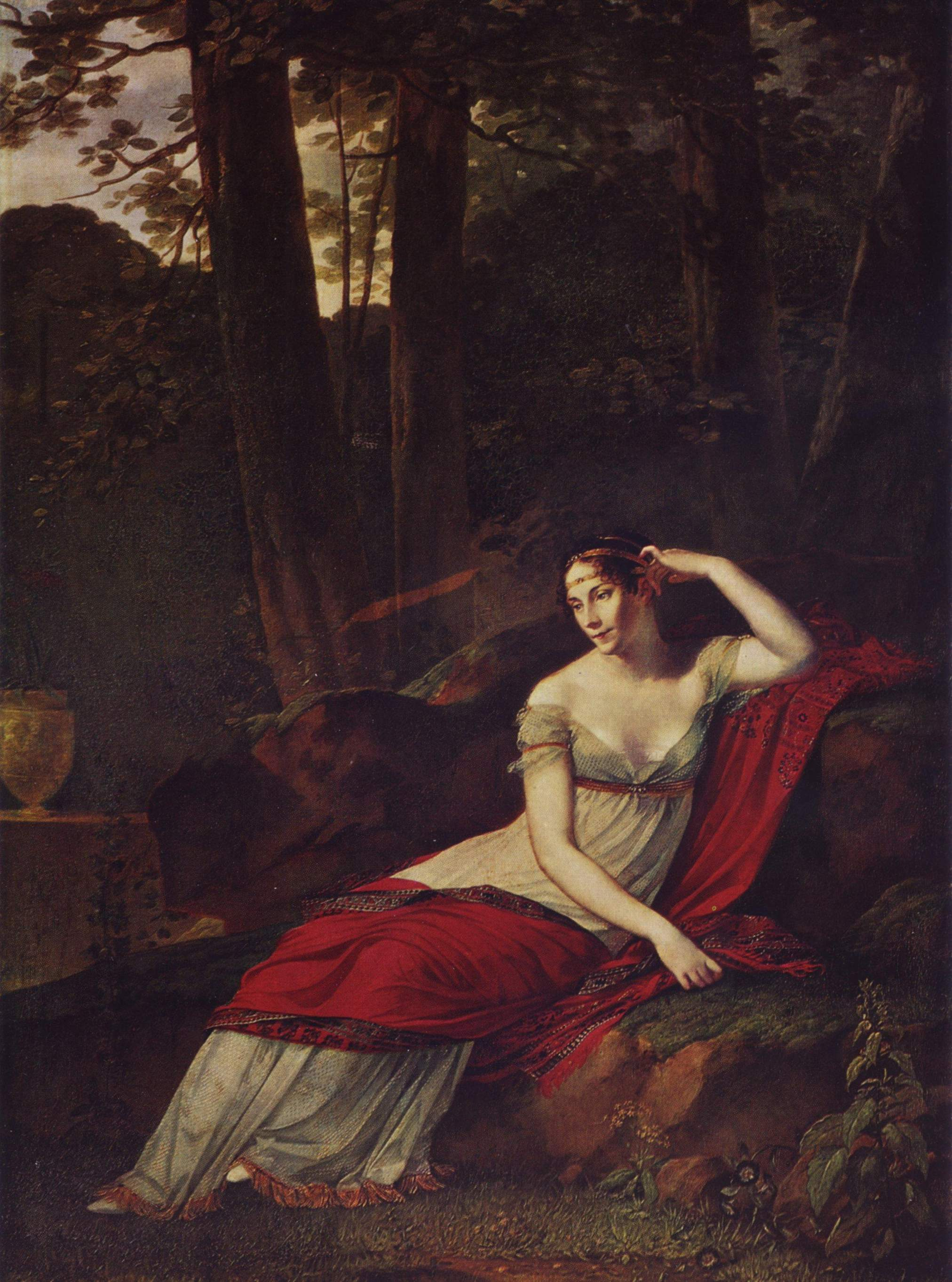
Portrait of Joséphine de Beauharnais, at the Louvre, Paris, 1805

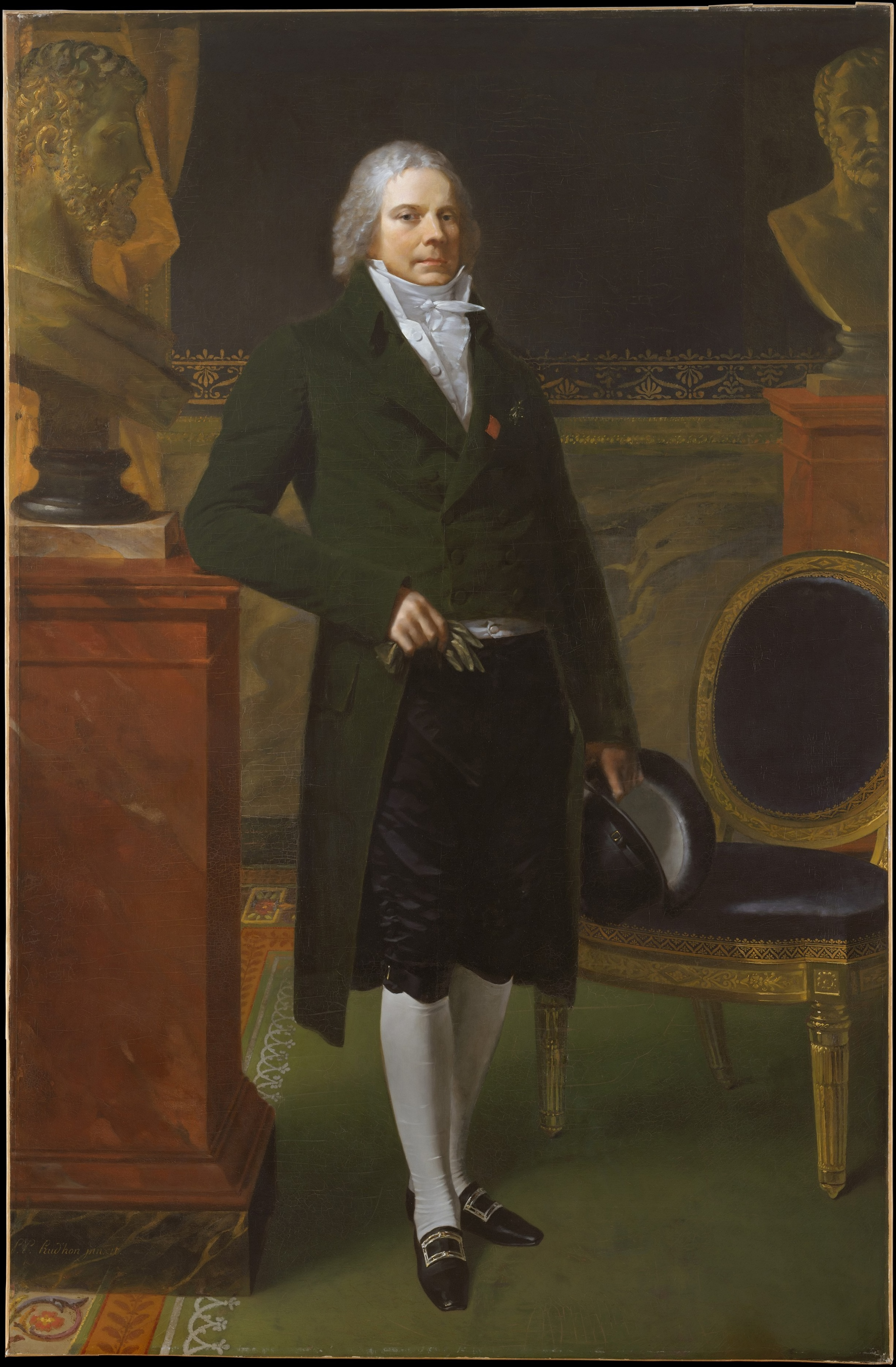
Portrait of Charles Maurice de Talleyrand-Périgord, 1817

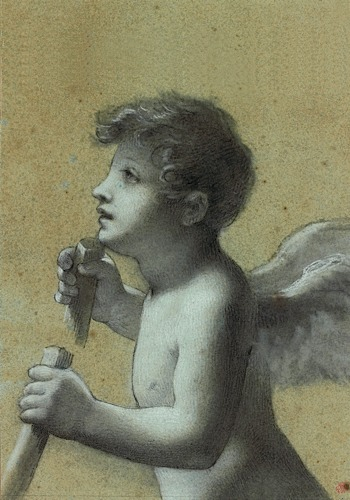
Study for The Dream of Happiness (with Constance Mayer), 1819
