= List of arcade video games: C =

This is a list of arcade video games organized alphabetically by name. It does not include PC or console games unless they were also released in video arcades. See Lists of video games for related lists.

Title	Alternate Title(s)	Year	Manufacturer	Genre(s)	Max. Players	PCB Model
Cabal	—	1988	Taito		2	
Cabaret Show	—	1992	AMT Company			
Cadash	—	1989	Taito			
Cadillacs and Dinosaurs	Cadillacs Kyouryuu Shinseiki ^{JP}	1992	Capcom	Beat 'em up	3	CPS1
Caladrius AC	—	2015	Sega	Shoot 'em up	2	Sega RingEdge
Cal.50	—	1989	SETA			
California Chase	—	1999	The Game Room	Racing		
California Speed	—	1998	Atari Games	Racing	1-4	
Calipso	—	1982	Tago Electronics			
Calorie Kun vs. Moguranian	—	1986	Vic Tokai/ Sega			
Cameltry	—	1989	Taito	Puzzle		
Campus Hunting Jong Tou Ki	—	1990	Dynax	Mahjong video game		
Candy Candy	—	1999	Eolith			
Candy Puzzle	—	1995	CD Express			
Cannon Ball (Soft)	—	1985	Soft			
Cannon Ball (Yun Sung)	—	1995	Yun Sung			
Cannon Spike	—	2000	Psikyo	Multi-directional shooter	2	
Canvas Croquis	—	1985	SNK			
Canyon Bomber	—	1977	Atari	Action	2	
Capcom Baseball	—	1989	Capcom	Sports		
Capcom Bowling	Coors Light Bowling	1988	Capcom	Sports		
Capcom Fighting Jam	Capcom Fighting Evolution	2004	Capcom	Fighting		
Capcom Sports Club	—	1997	Capcom	Sports		CPS2
Capcom vs. SNK: Millennium Fight 2000	—	2000	Capcom	Fighting	2	
Capcom Vs. SNK: Millennium Fight 2000 Pro	—	2000	Capcom	Fighting	2	
Capcom vs. SNK 2	Capcom Vs. SNK 2: Millionaire Fighting 2001^{JP}	2001	Capcom	Fighting	2	
Capcom World	Capcom World Adventure Quiz ^{JP}	1989	Capcom	Quiz	2	
Capcom World 2	Adventure Quiz Capcom World 2 ^{JP}	1992	Capcom	Quiz	2	CPS1
Captain America and The Avengers	—	1991	Data East	Beat 'em up	2 or 4	
Captain Commando	—	1991	Capcom	Beat 'em up	4	CPS1
Captain Silver	—	1987	Data East	Platformer	1	
Captain Tomaday	—	1999	Visco			NeoGeo
Car Hunt	—	1979	Sega			
Car Jamboree	—	1983	Omori Electric Co., Ltd.			
Car Polo	—	1977	Exidy		4	
Card Line	—	199?	Veltmeijer Automaten	Card video game		
Carket Ball	—	1996	SemiCom			
CarnEvil	—	1998	Midway		2	
Carnival	—	1980	Sega / Gremlin	Fixed shooter	2	
Carnival King	—	2002	Incredible Technologies			
Carrera	Bomberman (BS Electronics)	19??	BS Electronics			
Carrier Air Wing	U.S. Navy	1990	Capcom	Scrolling shooter	2	CPS1
CART Fury	—	2000	Midway	Racing	2	
Casanova	—	1994	Promat			
Cash Quiz	—	1986	Zilec-Zenitone			
Casino Five	—	1983	Merit			
Casino Strip	—	1984	Status Games			
Casino Strip II	—	1988	Status Games			
Casino Strip III	—	1992	Status Games			
Casino Strip IX (Quantum Industries)	—	1992	Quantum Industries			
Casino Strip IX (Status Games)	—	1988	Status Games			
Casino Strip Private Eyes	—	1996	Quantum Industries			
Casino Strip V	—	1985	Status Games			
Casino Strip VI	—	1988	Status Games			
Casino Strip VIII	—	1985	Status Games			
Casino Strip Vivid 1	—	1993	Quantum Industries			
Casino Strip X	—	1988	Status Games			
Casino Strip XI	—	1990	Status Games			
Casino Strip XII	—	1988	Status Games			
The Castle	The Rock					
Castle of Dracula	—	1994	Yun Sung			
Castle of Dragon	Dragon Unit	1990	SETA Corporation	Beat 'em up	2	
Castlevania: The Arcade	Akumajou Dracula: The Arcade	2008	Konami	Rail shooter	2	
Cat and Mouse	—	1982	Zaccaria	Platform game	1	
Catacomb	—	1982	MTM Games			
Catapult	—	1982	Epos	Action game	1	
Catch-22	Combat	1983	Exidy			
Cavelon	—	1983	Jetsoft	Maze		
Centipede	—	1981	Atari	Fixed shooter	2	
Cerberus	—	1985	Cinematronics		2	
Chack'n Pop	—	1983	Taito	Platformer	2	
Chain Reaction	Magical Drop ^{JP}	1995	Data East	Puzzle		
Challenger	—	1981	Centuri			
Challenger Draw Poker	—	198?	Videotronics			
Chameleon	—	1983	Jaleco			
Chameleon RX-1	—	2003	Digital Sunnil			Aleck64
Champion Baseball	—	1983	Sega	Sports		
Champion Baseball Part-2	—	1983	Sega	Sports		
Champion Boxing	—	1984	Sega			
Champion Number	—	1999				
Champion Pro Wrestling	—	1985	Sega			
Championship 9-Ball Shootout!	—	1993	Bundra Games			
Champion Wrestler	—	1989	Taito			
Championship Bowling	—	1989	SETA/ Romstar			
Championship Sprint	—	1986	Atari Games	Racing	2	
Chan Bara	—	1985	Data East	Beat 'em up	2	
Chance Kun	—	1982				
Change Air Blade	—	1999	Sammy Corporation	Scrolling shooter		
Change Lanes	—	1983	Taito			
Chaos Breaker	—	2004	Taito	Fighting	2	
Chaos Field	—	2004	MileStone	Scrolling shooter	1	
Chaos Heat	—	1998	Taito	Action	2	Taito G-NET
Charlie Ninja	—	1995	Mitchell Corporation			
Chase Bombers	—	1994	Taito	Racing	2	
Chase H.Q.	—	1988	Taito	Racing	1	
Chase H.Q. 2	Chase H. Q. : Nancy Yori Kinkyuu Renraku ^{JP}	2006	Taito	Racing	1	
Chatan Yarakuu Shanku – The Karate Tournament	—	1992	Mitchell Corporation			
Check Man	—	1982	Zilec			
Checkmate	—	1977	Bally Midway		1	
Cheeky Mouse	—	1980	Universal		2	
Cheese Chase	—	1994	Art & Magic			
Chequered Flag	—	1988	Konami			
Chelnov	Atomic Runner Chelnov - Tatakau Ningen Hatsudensho ^{JP} Atomic Runner	1988	Data East	Scrolling shooter	2	
Cheyenne	—	1984	Exidy	Shooting Gallery	1	
Chibi Maruko-chan: Maruko Deluxe Quiz	—	1995	Takara		2	NeoGeo
Chicken Draw	—	1984	Merit	Cards video game		
Chicken Shift	—	1984	Bally-Sente			
Chiller	—	1986	Exidy	Shooting Gallery	1	
China Gate	—	1988	Romstar	Platformer	2	
China Town (Data East)	—	1991	Data East			
Chinese Hero	—	1984	Taiyo			
Choky! Choky!	—	1995	SemiCom			
Choplifter	—	1985	Sega			Sega system 1
Chopper I	Koukuu Kihei Monogatari - The Legend of Air Cavalry^{JP}	1988	SNK			
Choro Q Hyper Racing 5	—	1999	Sega			Sega ST-V
ChuckECheese's Match Game	—	1993	Coastal Amusements			
Chulgyeok D-Day	The Last Day	1990	Dooyong			
Chuuka Taisen	Cloud Master	1988	Taito	Scrolling shooter	2	
Circus	Acrobat TV; Balloon Circus; Balloon Mini; Clowns; Devil Circus; Piccolo; Seesaw Jump; Springboard; T.T. Acrobat	1977	Exidy	Action		
Circus Charlie	—	1984	Konami	Action	2	
Cisco Heat	—	1990	Jaleco			
City Bomber	—	1987	Konami		2	
City Connection	Cruisin	1985	Jaleco		2	
City Love	—	1986	Nichibutsu			
Ckidzo	—	1976	Meadows Games			
Clash-Road	—	1986	Woodplace Inc.			
Clay Pigeon	—	1986	Exidy			
Clay Shoot	—	1979	Allied Leisure			
Claybuster	—	1978	Model Racing	Shooter	1	
Clean Sweep	—	1974	RamTek			
Cleopatra Fortune	—	1996	Taito	Puzzle	2	
Cleopatra Fortune Plus	—	2001	Taito	Puzzle	2	NAOMI GD-ROM
Cloak & Dagger	—	1983	Atari	Shooter	2	
Clowns	—	1978	Midway			
Cliff Hanger	—	1983	Stern Electronics			
The Cliffhanger: Edward Randy	—	1990	Data East	Action	2	
Club Kart	—	2001	Sega			
Club Kart: European Session	—	2002	Sega			
Club Kart for Cycraft	—	2003	Sega			
Club Kart Prize	—	2003	Sega			
Cluedo? Murder Mystery Quiz Game	—	1995	JPM International			
Cluster Buster	Graplop	1983	Data East			
Clutch Hitter	—	1991	Sega			
Cobra Command (1984)	—	1984	Data East			
Cobra Command (1988)	—	1988	Data East	Scrolling shooter	2	
Cobra Gunship	—	1976	Meadows Games			
Cobra The Arcade	—	2006	Konami	Rail shooter	2	
Code One Dispatch	—	2000	Konami	Racing	1	
Coinmaster Keno	—	2000	Coinmaster			
Coinmaster Roulette	—	2001	Coinmaster			
Colony 7	—	1981	Taito	Fixed shooter	2	
Color Match	—	2002	Nova Desitec			
Colorama	—	2001	Coinmaster			
Columns	—	1990	Sega	Puzzle	2	
Columns II	—	1990	Sega	Puzzle	2	
Combat Hawk	—	1987	Sega / Sanritsu			
Columns '97	—	1996	Sega			Sega ST-V
Combat School	Boot Hill ^{World}	1987	Konami		2	
The Combatribes	—	1990	Technōs Japan	Beat 'em up	3	
Come Back Toto	—	1996	SoftClub			
Come on Baby!	—	2000	Expotato Company			
Commando (Capcom)	Senjou no Ookami^{JP}	1985	Capcom / Data East			
Commando (Sega)	—	1983	Sega			
CoMotion	—	1976	Gremlin			
Competition Golf - Final Round	—	1986	Data East	Sports		
Complex X	—	1984	Taito			
Computer Othello	—	1978	Nintendo R&D1	Strategy	2	
Computer Quiz Atama no Taisou	—	1983	Yachiyo Electronics			
Computer Space	—	1971	Nutting Associates	Multi-directional shooter	1	
Computer Space (2 Player)	—	1973	Nutting Associates	Multi-directional shooter	1	
Computer Space Ball	—	1972	Nutting Associates	Sports	2	
Confidential Mission	—	2000	Sega			NAOMI GD-ROM
Congo Bongo	—	1983	Sega	Platformer	2	
Continental Circus	—	1987	Taito	Racing	1	
Contra	—	1987	Konami	Run and gun	2	
Cookie & Bibi	—	1995	SemiCom			
Cookie & Bibi 2	—	1996	SemiCom			
Cookie & Bibi 3	—	1997	SemiCom			
Cool Boarders - Arcade Jam	—	1998	Tecmo			
Cool Minigame Collection	—	1999	SemiCom			
Cool Pool	—	1992	Catalina			
Cool Riders	—	1995	Sega	Racing	2	
Cop 01	—	1985	Nichibutsu		2	
COPS	—	1994	Atari			
Cops N Robbers	—	1976	Atari	Driving	4	
Coronation St. - Quiz Game	—	1999	JPM International			
Cosmic Alien	—	1979	Universal		2	
Cosmic Avenger	—	1981	Universal	Scrolling shooter	2	
Cosmic Chasm	—	1983	Cinematronics	Multi-directional shooter	2	
Cosmic Cop	Armed Police Unit Gallop	1991	Irem		2	
Cosmic Guerilla	—	1979	Universal		2	
Cosmic Monsters	—	1979	Universal		2	
Cosmic Monsters 2	—	1979	Universal		2	
Cosmic Smash	—	2001	Sega			NAOMI cart.
Cosmo	—	1979	TDS	Fixed shooter	2	
Cosmo Gang the Puzzle	—	1992	Namco	Puzzle	2	
Cosmo Gang the Video	—	1991	Namco	Fixed shooter	2	
Cosmo Police Galivan	—	1985	Nichibutsu	Platformer	2	
Cosmos	—	1981	Century Electronics			
Cotton: Fantastic Night Dreams	—	1989	Success	Scrolling shooter	2	
Cotton 2: Magical Night Dreams	—	1997	Success	Scrolling shooter	2	
Cotton Boomerang	—	1998	Success	Scrolling shooter	2	
Counter Steer	—	1985	Data East	Racing	2	
Counter-Strike Neo	—	2005				
Counter Run	—	1988	Nihon System / Sega (license)			
Crack Down	—	1989	Sega			
Crackin' DJ	—	2000	Sega			NAOMI cart.
Crackin' DJ Part 2	—	2001	Sega			NAOMI cart.
Crackshot	—	1985	Exidy			
Crash	—	1979	Exidy	Driving	1	
Crash 'N Score	—	1975	Atari	Driving	2	
Crater Raider	—	1984	Bally Midway		2	
Crayon Shin-chan - Ora To Asobo	—	1993	Taito			
Crazy Balloon	T.T Crazy Balloon	1980	Taito		2	
Crazy Balls	—	1978	EGS		1	
Crazy Climber	—	1980	Nichibutsu	Action	2	
Crazy Climber 2	—	1988	Nichibutsu	Action	2	
Crazy Cross	Taisen Puzzle-dama	1996	Konami			
Crazy Fight	—	1996	Subsino			
Crazy Kong	—	1981	Falcon			
Crazy Kong - Part II	—	1981	Falcon			
Crazy Rally	—	1985	Tecfri			
Crazy Taxi	—	1999	Sega	Racing	1	
Crazy Taxi 3: High Roller	—	2003	Sega	Racing	1	
Crazy War	—	2002	Eolith			
Crime City	—	1989	Taito			
Crime Fighters	—	1989	Konami			
Crime Patrol	—	1993	American Laser Games	Light gun shooter	1	
Crime Patrol 2: Drug Wars	—	1993	American Laser Games	Light gun shooter	1	
Critter Crusher	Tatacot	1995	Sega			
Crisis Zone	—	1999	Namco	Shooting gallery		
Cross Pang	—	1998	F2 System			
Crossbow	—	1983	Exidy	Shooting Gallery	1	
Crossed Swords	—	1990	ADK / SNK	Hack and slash / Beat 'em up	2	NeoGeo
Crowns Golf	Champions Golf	1984	Nasco Japan	Sports		
Crowns Golf In Hawaii	—	1985	Nasco Japan	Sports		
Cruis'n Exotica	—	1999	Midway	Racing	2	
Cruis'n USA	—	1994	Midway	Racing	2	
Cruis'n World	—	1996	Midway	Racing	2	
Crusher Makochan	—	1999	Takumi			
Crypt Killer	—	1995	Konami	Shooting Gallery	3	
Crystal Castles	—	1983	Atari	Action	2	
Crystal Gal Mahjong	—	1986	Nichibutsu			
Crystal Gal Mahjong II	—	1986	Nichibutsu			
The Crystal Maze	—	1993	Barcrest		2	
The Crystal Maze: Team Challenge	—	1994	Barcrest		2	
The Crystal of Kings	—	2001	BrezzaSoft	Beat 'em up	2	
Cuatro en Linea	—	1991	Compumatic			
Cube Quest	—	1983	Simutrek Inc.	Shoot 'em up	1	
Cue Brick	—	1989	Konami	Puzzle	2	
Curve Ball	—	1984	Mylstar Electronics			
Cute Fighters	—	1998	SemiCom			
Cutie Q	—	1979	Namco	Breakout / Video pinball	2	
Cybattler	—	1993	Jaleco	Scrolling shooter	2	
Cyber Commando	—	1995	Namco	Simulation game	1	
Cyber Cycles	—	1995	Namco	Racing	2	
Cyber Diver	—	2009	Taito	First-person shooter	1	
Cyber Police ESWAT	—	1989	Sega	Run and gun	2	
Cyber Sled	—	1993	Namco	Simulation game	2	
Cyber Troopers Virtual-On Force	—	2001	Sega	Action	1	
Cyber Troopers Virtual-On Oratorio Tangram	—	1998	Sega AM3	Fighting	2	
Cyber-Lip	—	1990	Data East	Run and gun	2	NeoGeo
Cyberball	—	1988	Atari Games	Sports	4	
Cyberball 2072	—	1989	Atari Games	Sports	2	
Cyberbots: Full Metal Madness	—	1995	Capcom	Fighting	2	CPS2
Cycle Mahbou	—	1984	Taito	Action	2	
Cycle Shooting	—	1986	Taito	Action	2	
Cycle Warriors	—	1991	Tatsumi	Action	2	
Cyvern: The Dragon Weapons	—	1998	Kaneko	Scrolling shooter	2	
