= Electro-mechanical game =

Type of arcade game

Electro-mechanical games (EM games) are types of arcade games that operate on a combination of some electronic circuitry and mechanical actions from the player to move items contained within the game's cabinet. Some of these were early light gun games using light-sensitive sensors on targets to register hits, while others were simulation games such as driving games, combat flight simulators and sports games. EM games were popular in amusement arcades from the late 1940s up until the 1970s, serving as alternatives to pinball machines, which had been stigmatized as games of chance during that period. EM games lost popularity in the 1970s, as arcade video games had emerged to replace them in addition to newer pinball machines designed as games of skill.

== Definition ==
EM games typically combined mechanical engineering technology with various electrical components, such as motors, switches, resistors, solenoids, relays, bells, buzzers and electric lights. EM games lie somewhere in the middle between fully electronic games and mechanical games.

EM games have a number of different genres/categories. "Novelty" or "land-sea-air" games refer to simulation games that simulate aspects of various vehicles, such as cars (similar to racing video games), submarines (similar to vehicular combat video games), or aircraft (similar to combat flight simulator video games). Gun games refer to games that involve shooting with a gun-like peripheral (such as a light gun or similar device), similar to light gun shooter video games. "General" arcade games refer to all other types of EM arcade games, including various different types of sports games. "Audio-visual" or "realistic" games referred to novelty games that used advanced special effects to provide a simulation experience.

== History ==
=== Predecessors to electro-mechanical games ===
Coin-operated arcade amusements based on games of skill emerged around the turn of the 20th century, such as fortune telling, strength tester machines and mutoscopes. Normally installed at carnivals and fairs, entrepreneurs created standalone arcades to house these machines. More interactive mechanical games emerged around the 1930s, such as skee-ball, as well as the first simple pinball games. However, when pinball was first introduced, it lacked features such as user-controlled flippers, and were considered to be games of chance. This led to several jurisdictions to ban pinball machines fearing their influence on youth.

=== Early electro-mechanical games (1940s to early 1960s) ===
Alternatives to pinball were electro-mechanical games (EM games) that clearly demonstrated themselves as games of skill to avoid the stigma of pinball. The transition from mechanical arcade games to electro-mechanical games dates back to around the time of World War II, with different types of arcade games gradually making the transition during the post-war period between the 1940s and 1960s.

At the 1939–1940 New York World's Fair, in April 1940, Edward Condon of the Westinghouse Electric Company displayed the Nimatron, a non-programmable electro-mechanical computer that played games of Nim, using electro-mechanical relays, buttons, and lightbulbs. The device, intended solely for entertainment, saw nearly 100,000 games during the fair, and may have inspired the Nimrod, a full digital computer programmed to play Nim at the 1951 Festival of Britain, considered as one of the precursors of the video game.

In 1941, International Mutoscope Reel Company released the electro-mechanical driving game Drive Mobile, which had an upright arcade cabinet similar to what arcade video games would later use. It was derived from older British driving games from the 1930s. In Drive Mobile, a steering wheel was used to control a model car over a road painted on a metal drum, with the goal being to keep the car centered as the road shifts left and right. Kasco (short for Kansai Seisakusho Co.) introduced this type of electro-mechanical driving game to Japan in 1958 with Mini Drive, which followed a similar format but had a longer cabinet allowing a longer road. Capitol Projector's 1954 machine Auto Test was a driving test simulation that used film reel to project pre-recorded driving video footage, awarding the player points for making correct decisions as the footage is played. These early driving games consisted of only the player vehicle on the road, with no rival cars to race against.

By the 1950s, EM games were using a timer to create a sense of urgency in the gameplay. An example of this is the boxing game K.O. Champ (1955) by International Mutoscope Reel Company. By 1961, however, the US arcade industry had been stagnating. This in turn had a negative effect on Japanese arcade distributors such as Sega that had been depending on US imports up until then. Sega co-founder David Rosen responded to market conditions by having Sega develop original arcade games in Japan.

=== Electro-mechanical renaissance (late 1960s to mid-1970s) ===
From the late 1960s, EM games incorporated more elaborate electronics and mechanical action to create a simulated environment for the player. These games overlapped with the introduction of arcade video games, and in some cases, were prototypical of the experiences that arcade video games offered. The late 1960s to early 1970s were considered the "electro-mechanical golden age" in Japan, and the "novelty renaissance" or "technological renaissance" in North America. A new category of "audio-visual" novelty games emerged during this era, mainly established by several Japanese arcade manufacturers. Arcades had previously been dominated by jukeboxes, before a new wave of EM arcade games emerged that were able to generate significant earnings for arcade operators.

Periscope, a submarine simulator and light gun shooter, was released by Nakamura Manufacturing Company (later called Namco) in 1965 and then by Sega in 1966. It used lights and plastic waves to simulate sinking ships from a submarine, and had players look through a periscope to direct and fire torpedoes, which were represented by colored lights and electronic sound effects. Sega's version became an instant success in Japan, Europe, and North America, where it was the first arcade game to cost a quarter per play, which would remain the standard price for arcade games for many years to come. The success of Periscope was a turning point for the arcade industry.

Periscope revived the novelty game business, and established a "realistic" or "audio-visual" category of games, using advanced special effects to provide a simulation experience. It was the catalyst for the "novelty renaissance" where a wide variety of novelty/specialty games (also called "land-sea-air" games) were released during the late 1960s to early 1970s, from quiz games and racing games to hockey and football games, many adopting the quarter-play price point.

As Japan's arcade industry grew rapidly, a new category of "audio-visual" novelty games began being manufactured in the late 1960s from Japanese arcade manufacturers, with the four largest being Sega, Taito, Nakamura Manufacturing, and Kasco. (Note: 湘阿織機, Kansai Seiki) Their "audio-visual" games were exported internationally to North America and Europe, selling in large quantities that had not been approached by most arcade machines in years. This led to a "technological renaissance" in the late 1960s, which would later be critical in establishing a healthy arcade environment for video games to flourish in the 1970s.

The success of Periscope led to American distributors turning to Japan for new arcade games in the late 1960s, which in turn encouraged competition from traditional Chicago arcade manufacturers. American arcade firms such as Midway Manufacturing, Chicago Coin and Allied Leisure responded by cloning the latest novelty games from Japan, establishing a clone market in North America. Japanese manufacturers responded by releasing new game concepts every few months to stay ahead of the clone competition, but the American clones gradually succeeded in driving Japanese firms out of the North American market in the early 1970s. Despite this, Japan continued to have a thriving local market with more than 500,000–700,000 arcade machines by 1973, mostly consisting of EM shooting and driving games from Japanese manufacturers alongside pinball machines imported from the United States.

Atari founder Nolan Bushnell, when he was a college student, worked at an arcade where he became familiar with EM games such as Chicago Coin's Speedway (1969), watching customers play and helping to maintain the machinery, while learning how it worked and developing his understanding of how the game business operated.

==== Shooting and simulation games ====
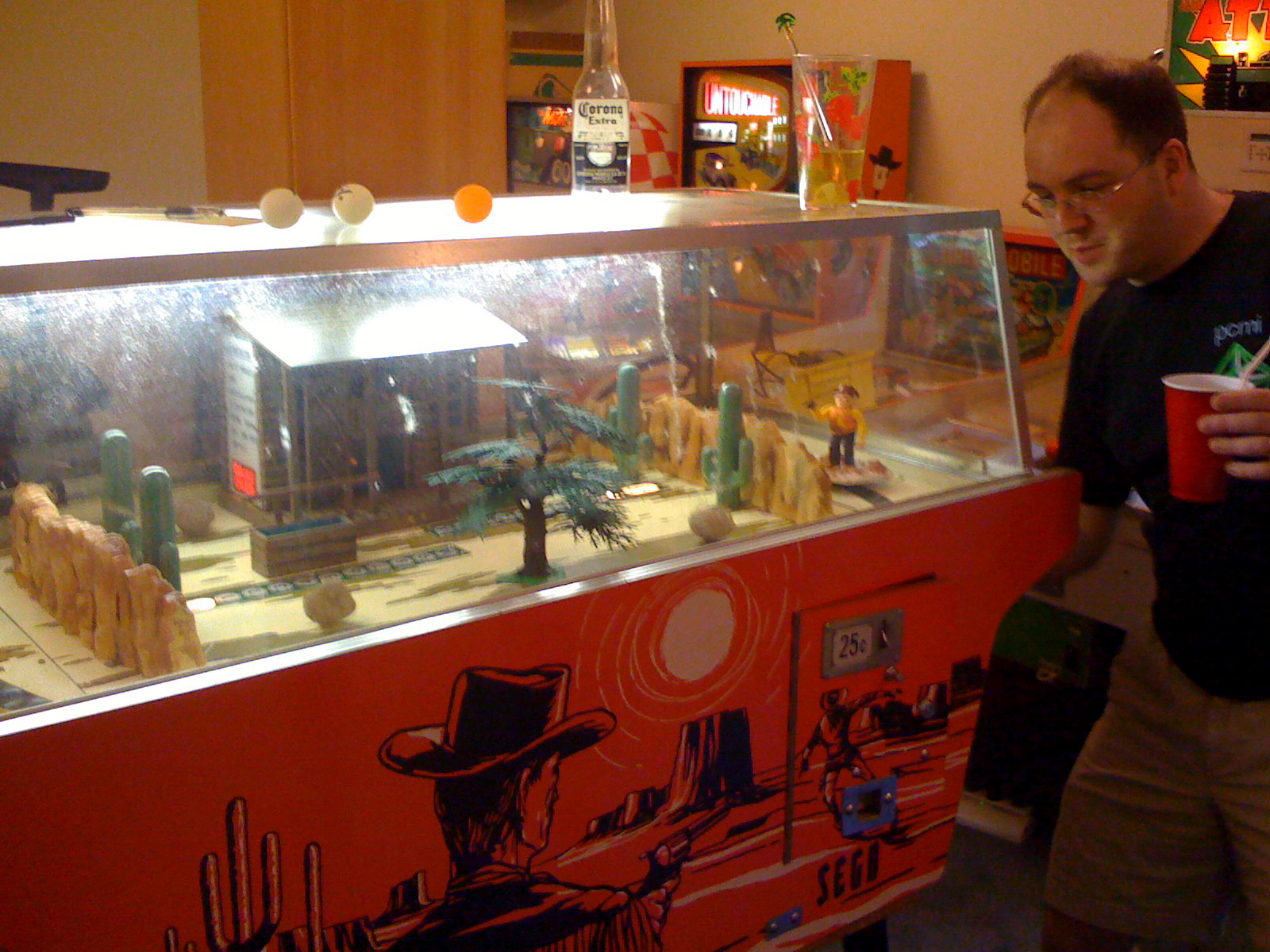
Sega's Gun Fight (1969), a two-player EM game that used light-sensitive targets. It was one of the first games with head-to-head shooting, inspiring arcade shooter video games such as Gun Fight (1975).

Periscope established a trend of missile-launching gameplay during the late 1960s to 1970s, with the game's periscope viewer cabinet design later adopted by arcade video games such as Midway's Sea Wolf (1976) and Atari's Battlezone (1980). In the late 1960s, Sega began producing gun games which somewhat resemble first-person shooter video games, but which were in fact electro-mechanical games that used rear image projection in a manner similar to a zoetrope to produce moving animations on a screen. They often had vertical playfields that used mirrors to create an artificial sense of depth. It was a fresh approach to gun games that Sega introduced with Duck Hunt, which began location testing in 1968 and released in January 1969. It had animated moving targets which disappear from the screen when shot, solid-state electronic sound effects, and awarded a higher score for head shots.

Missile, a shooter and vehicular combat game released by Sega in 1969, had electronic sound and a moving film strip to represent the targets on a projection screen. A two-way joystick with a fire button was used to shoot and steer the missile onto oncoming planes displayed on a screen, while two directional buttons were used to move the player's tank; when a plane is hit, an animated explosion appears on screen, accompanied by the sound of an explosion. According to Ken Horowitz, it may have been the first arcade game to use a joystick with a fire button. Missile became a major arcade hit for Sega in the United States, inspiring a number of manufacturers to produce similar games. Midway later released a version called S.A.M.I. (1970) and adapted it into the arcade video game Guided Missile (1977). Midway also released the submarine-themed missile-launching games Sea Raider (1969) and Sea Devil (1970). Joysticks subsequently became the standard control scheme for arcade games.

Sega's Gun Fight (1969) had two players control cowboy figurines on opposing sides of a playfield full of obstacles, with each player attempting to shoot the opponent's cowboy. It had a Western theme and was one of the first games to feature competitive head-to-head shooting between two players, inspiring several early Western-themed shooter video games. Notably, the game's concept was adapted by Tomohiro Nishikado into Taito's shooter video game Western Gun (1975), which Midway released as Gun Fight in North America. Sega's Jet Rocket, developed in 1969, was a combat flight simulator featuring cockpit controls that could move the player aircraft around a landscape displayed on a screen and shoot missiles onto targets that explode when hit. The game displayed three-dimensional terrain with buildings, produced using a new type of special belt technology along with fluorescent paint to simulate a night view. At Japan's 1970 Coin Machine Show, Jet Rocket was considered the best game at the show. Upon its debut, the game was cloned by three Chicago manufacturers, which led to the game under-performing in North America and Sega leaving the North American arcade market for years. Sega released several other similar EM flight combat games, including Dive Bomber (1971) and Air Attack (1972).

Tomohiro Nishikado developed the target shooting EM game Sky Fighter, released by Taito in 1971. The game used mirrors to project images of model planes in front of a moving sky-blue background from a film canister on a rotating drum. The game was a hit, but too large for most locations, so it was followed by a scaled-down version, Sky Fighter II, which sold 3,000 arcade cabinets. In 1972, Sega released an electro-mechanical game called Killer Shark, a first-person light-gun shooter that used similar projection technology to Sega's earlier shooting games, and made an appearance in the hit Steven Spielberg film Jaws (1975). In 1974, Nintendo released Wild Gunman, a light-gun shooter based on the Laser Clay Shooting System that used full-motion video-projection from 16 mm film to display live-action cowboy opponents on the screen.

Several EM arcade games gave the illusion of holography in the 1970s. The San Francisco based Multiplex Company used its "rotating cylindrical hologram" technology to provide animation for several shooting games from Kasco and Midway. Kasco used it in Gun Smoke (1975), Samurai and Bank Robbers (1977), while Midway used it in Top Gun (1976). These games predated Sega's later arcade video game Time Traveler (1991) in their use of holographic-like technology. Kasco's Bank Robbers (Note: バンクロバーズ, Banku Robāzu) was a commercial success, becoming the eighth highest-grossing EM arcade game of 1978 in Japan. Taito also announced a holographic-like arcade gun game at the AMOA show in October 1975. In 1977, Kasco released a shooting EM ninja game called Ninja Gun, which helped introduce a number of American children to ninjas in popular culture by the early 1980s.

One of the last EM games from Sega was Heli-Shooter (1977), a combat flight simulator that combines the use of a CPU processor with electro-mechanical components, screen projection and audio tape deck. The gameplay involves the player piloting a helicopter using a throttle joystick (to accelerate and decelerate) and pedals (to maneuver left and right) across a realistic three-dimensional landscape and shooting at military targets across the landscape. In Japan, it was one of the top ten highest-grossing EM arcade games of 1977, and it released in North America the same year. One of the last successful EM shooting games was Namco's light gun game Shoot Away (1977), which was Japan's third highest-grossing EM arcade game of 1977 and highest-grossing EM arcade game of 1980, while maintaining a presence in Western arcades into the 1980s.

==== Racing games ====
A new type of driving game was introduced in Japan, with Kasco's 1968 racing game Indy 500, which was licensed by Chicago Coin for release in North America as Speedway in 1969. It had a circular racetrack with rival cars painted on individual rotating discs illuminated by a lamp, which produced colorful graphics projected using mirrors to give a pseudo-3D first-person perspective on a screen, resembling a windscreen view. It had collision detection, with players having to dodge cars to avoid crashing, as well as electronic sound for the car engines and collisions. This gave it greater realism than earlier driving games, and it resembled a prototypical arcade racing video game, with an upright cabinet, yellow marquee, three-digit scoring, coin box, steering wheel and accelerator pedal. Indy 500 sold over 2,000 arcade cabinets in Japan, while Speedway sold over 10,000 cabinets in North America, becoming the biggest arcade hit in years. Like Periscope, Speedway also charged a quarter per play, further cementing quarter-play as the US arcade standard for over two decades.

Other EM racing games derived from Indy 500 included Namco's Racer and Sega's Grand Prix, the latter a 1969 release that similarly had a first-person view, electronic sound, a dashboard with a racing wheel and accelerator, and a forward-scrolling road projected on a screen. Taito's similar 1970 rear-projection driving game Super Road 7 involved driving a car down an endlessly scrolling road while having to dodge cars, which inspired Tomohiro Nishikado to develop the Taito racing video game Speed Race (1974). Chicago Coin adapted Speedway into a motorbike racing game, Motorcycle, in 1970.

Speedway also had an influence on Atari founder Nolan Bushnell, who had originally planned to develop a driving video game, influenced by Speedway which at the time was the biggest-selling game at his arcade, but he ended up developing Pong (1972) instead. Atari eventually developed a driving video game later on, Gran Trak 10 (1974).

Sega's EM driving games Stunt Car (1970) and Dodgem Crazy (1972) are seen as precursors to later driving video games that involve ramming cars, such as Exidy's Destruction Derby (1975) and Death Race (1976) as well as Atari's Crash 'N Score (1975), while lacking their dynamically changing open arenas enabled by video game technology. Kasco used 8 mm film for a 1970s driving game, The Driver, which projected live-action video footage filmed by Toei Company.

There were also two EM racing games from 1971 that gave the illusion of three-dimensional holography, Bally's Road Runner and Sega's Monte Carlo. The player's car was animated with holographic-like technology, while the rival cars were standard model cars like other EM games. During a collision, an animation shows the player's car flipping into the air several times.

One of the last successful electro-mechanical arcade racing games was F-1, a racing game developed by Namco and distributed by Atari in 1976. The gameplay is viewed from the perspective of the driver's viewpoint, which is displayed on the screen using a projector system. It was the highest-grossing arcade game of 1976 and 1977 in Japan (ahead of every video game), and the highest-grossing EM arcade game of 1977 in the United States. Namco's F-1 is believed to have been influenced by Kasco's Indy 500, and in turn F-1 provided the basis for Namco's hit racing video game Pole Position (1982), which was co-designed by F-1 designer Sho Osugi.

==== Sports games ====
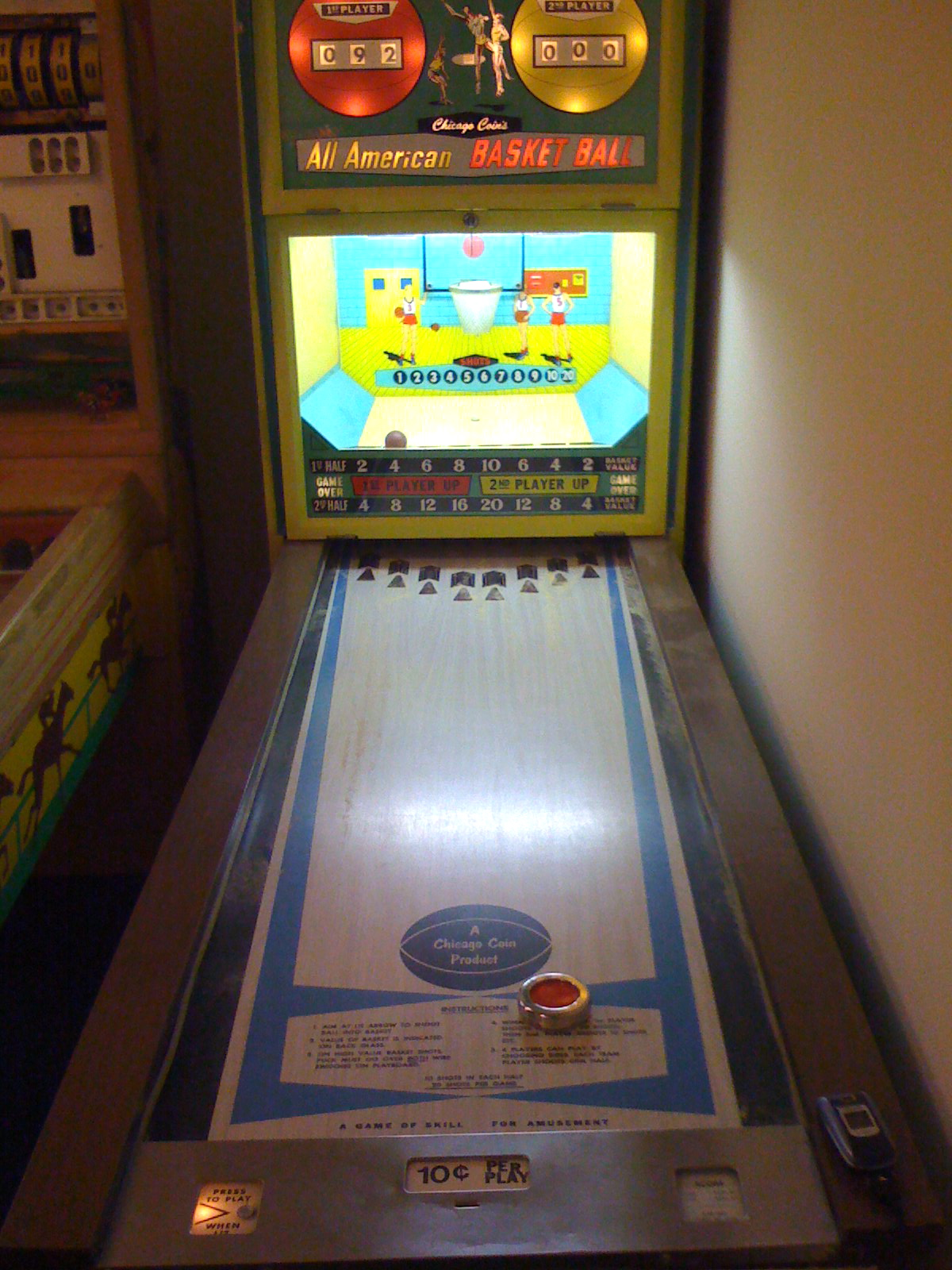
All American Basket Ball (1969), an EM game produced by Chicago Coin

EM bowling games called "bowlers" included Bally Manufacturing's Bally Bowler and Chicago Coin's Corvette in 1966. EM baseball games included Midway's Little League (1966) and Chicago Coin's All Stars Baseball (1968).

Taito entered the EM industry with sports games such as Crown Soccer Special (1967), a two-player game that simulated association football using electronic components such as pinball flippers, and Crown Basketball, which debuted in the US as the highest-earning arcade game at the 1968 Tampa Fair and also had a quarter-play option.

Sega released an EM game similar to air hockey in 1968, MotoPolo, where two players moved around motorbikes to knock balls into the opponent's goal; it also used an 8-track player to play back the sounds of the motorbikes. Air hockey itself was later created by a group of Brunswick Billiards employees between 1969 and 1972.

=== Later electro-mechanical games (mid-1970s to 1990s) ===
The arrival of arcade video games eventually led to the decline of electro-mechanical games during the 1970s. Following the arrival of arcade video games with Pong (1972) and its clones, electro-mechanical games continued to have a strong presence in arcades for much of the 1970s. In Japan, EM games remained more popular than video games up until the late 1970s. Japanese arcade manufacturers initially lacked expertise with solid-state electronics and found Pong-style video games to be simplistic compared to more complex EM games, so it took longer for video games to penetrate Japan than it had in the United States. Meanwhile in the United States, after the market became flooded with Pong clones, the Pong market crashed around the mid-1970s, which led to traditional Chicago coin-op manufacturers mainly sticking to EM games up until the late 1970s. EM games eventually declined following the arrival of Space Invaders (1978) and the golden age of arcade video games in the late 1970s.

Several electro-mechanical games that appeared in the 1970s have remained popular in arcades through to the present day, notably air hockey, whac-a-mole and medal games. Medal games started becoming popular with Sega's Harness Racing (1974), Nintendo's EVR Race (1975) and Aruze's The Derby Vφ (1975). The first whac-a-mole game, Mogura Taiji ("Mole Buster"), was released by TOGO in 1975. Mogura Taiji became the second highest-grossing EM game of 1976 in Japan, second only to Namco's F-1 that year. In the late 1970s, arcade centers in Japan began to be flooded with "mole buster" games. Mogura Taiji was introduced to North America in 1976, which inspired Bob's Space Racers to produce their own version of the game called "Whac-A-Mole" in 1977, while Namco released their own popular "mole buster" game called Sweet Licks (1981).

Electro-mechanical games experienced a resurgence during the 1980s. Air hockey, whac-a-mole and medal games have since remained popular arcade attractions. Hoop Shot, a Super Shot basketball skill-toss game manufactured by Doyle & Associates, was released in 1985 and became a hit, inspiring numerous imitators within a year, leading to super shot games becoming popular in the late 1980s. In 1990, Capcom entered the bowling industry with Bowlingo, a coin-operated, electro-mechanical, fully automated mini ten-pin bowling installation; it was smaller than a standard bowling alley, designed to be smaller and cheaper for arcades. Bowlingo drew significant earnings in North America upon release in 1990. In 1991, Bromley released an electro-mechanical rifle shooting game, Ghost Town, resembling classic EM shooting games.
