= Calorie (disambiguation) =

A calorie can be any of two units of heat or food energy ("small" and "large"). The word may also refer to:

- Calories (story) a 1951 novel by L. Sprague deCamp
- Calorie Kun Vs. Moguranian, a video game
- Calorie restriction, a dietary regime
- Calorie count laws for restaurant chains
- Empty calorie, calorie provided by food without other essential nutrients
- CalorieMate, a Japanese brand of energy-supplement foods
- CalorieKing, a company offering weight loss products and services
- Good Calories, Bad Calories a 2007 book by Gary Taubes
- CR Society International, formerly Calorie Restriction Society
- CALERIE, a food research program by the Pennington Biomedical Research Center

== See also ==
- Caloric (disambiguation)
