= Demolition Derby =

Demolition Derby may refer to:

- Demolition derby, a motorsport usually presented at county fairs and festivals
- Demolition Derby (1984 video game), a video game by Bally Midway
- Destruction Derby (1975 video game) or Demolition Derby, a video game by Exidy and by Chicago Coin
- Demolition Derby (album), a 1972 album by Sandy Bull
- "Demolition Derby", a song by the 69 Eyes from Savage Garden
- "Demolition Derby", a 2017 song by Dune Rats from The Kids Will Know It's Bullshit
- "Demolition Derby", the Round 21, 2000 AFL match between Fremantle and the West Coast Eagles
- Demolition Derby, an amusement park ride manufactured by Zamperla

== See also ==
- Destruction Derby, a 1995 video game by Reflections Interactive
