= Jumping Acrobats =

1981 video game

- Developer: Philips N.V.
- Publishers: PAL: Philips N.V.; NA: North American Philips
- Platform: Odyssey²/Videopac
- Release: Odyssey²: PAL: 1981; NA: October 1982
- Genre: Action
- Modes: Single-player, Multiplayer

Videopac 33 - Jumping Acrobats, known in North America as P.T. Barnum's Acrobats!, is 1981 action video game by Philips N.V. for the Philips Videopac G7000, also known as the Magnavox Odyssey². It is very similar to Exidy's arcade game Circus, itself a rethemed version of Atari's Breakout. In late 1982, it was rethemed around the entertainment properties of P.T. Barnum by the Odyssey Software Development Group for its North American release. This version also included compatibility with "The Voice of Odyssey²" expansion module.

== Gameplay ==
Two acrobats take turns bouncing each other off a see-saw in order to pop as many balloons as possible. Balloons appear in three rows and move slowly back and forth across the screen. Every time an acrobat touches a balloon in the air, it pops and they get launched back in the air briefly. In the single-player mode, one player takes control of the see-saw at the bottom of the screen and must catch the other acrobat before they hit the ground. In the multiplayer mode, each player controls one acrobat and takes turns controlling the see-saw on every successful jump. Alternatively, players can alternate each time the see-saw misses an acrobat. Players get ten chances to gather points without hitting the ground before the game ends.

Players can choose to add a shield between the see-saw and the balloons, which is either stationary or moves randomly. They can also choose to play with stationary balloons. The North American version adds voice samples with the addition of the optional "Voice of Odyssey²" expansion module. The acrobats will shout advice and compliments to each other and provide exclamations like "Ouch" or "Turkey" on failures.

The white acrobat bouncing on top of blue, yellow, and red balloons, with the blue acrobat down below unprepared to catch the other.

== Reception ==
Bill Kunkel and Arnie Katz of Electronic Games said there was "nothing startlingly new about the game" but it was still a "must buy" for Odyssey² owners. In Arcade Express, they said it was a "well-implemented" version of Circus and gave it an eight out of ten. The Video Game Update recommended the game and called it "highly entertaining." Perry Greenberg writing for Video Games said "the exciting sound effects", "colorful graphics", and "the antics of the amusing acrobatic figures" made for a "welcome addition to the Odyssey game library" and would make P.T. Barnum proud.

JoyStik gave the game one star and called it a lackluster clone of Circus Atari. The considered the controls "difficult and imprecise" and the voice enhancements generic and unmemorable. Editor of The Logical Gamer, Alan R. Bechtold, grew tired of the game quickly and criticized the graphics. Mike Wilson also of The Logical Gamer thought the see-saw was too sluggish but thought it had "good action" and saw it as a sign that Odyssey² was "beginning to move into 1982." Michael Blanchet in his syndicated newspaper column Win at Video was surprised that Philips had published the game following K.C. Munchkin! as he considered P.T. Barnum's Acrobats! and Circus Atari to be "identical". He also considered it to be one of the best Odyssey² yet released. E.C. Meade writing for Videogaming & Computergaming Illustrated said the game "has serious flaws" and complained about long lengths of time waiting for the acrobats to fall back down. However, he enjoyed the different variations and thought it had a very different feel to Circus Atari. Meade's co-reviewer Jim Clark was "much less lively than Circus Atari" but thought the voice samples were realistic.

British magazine Computer and Video Games called Jumping Acrobats "difficult to master" and "extremely addictive" French magazine Tilt thought the unrealistic proportions detracted from the game and thought there were too many balloons on screen. Classic Gamer Magazine called it a "barely disguised copy of Circus Atari, right down to the two clowns and the mobile see-saw."
