= Caloric =

Caloric may refer to:

== Companies and products ==
- Caloric (automobile), American automobile company
- Caloric (brand), American brand of kitchen appliances

== Nutrition ==
- Calorie, also known as caloric value, a unit of energy
- Caloric deficit, consumption of fewer calories than expended
- Caloric restriction mimetic, hypothetical anti-ageing dietary supplement or drug candidate
- Calorie restriction, also known as caloric restriction, a dietary regimen
- Food energy, also known as caloric intake, chemical energy animals derive from food
- Energy density, also known as caloric concentration, energy per unit volume
- Sugar substitute, also known as non-caloric sweetener, sugarless food additive intended to provide a sweet taste
- Weight gain, also known as caloric surplus, increase in a person's total body mass

== Science and medicine ==
- Caloric theory, a superseded scientific theory
  - Hot air engine, also known as caloric engine, external combustion engine using air as the working fluid
- Caloric polynomial, a polynomial solution to the heat (or diffusion) equation in mathematics
- Caloric reflex test, test of the vestibulo-ocular reflex

== Other uses ==
- Caloric ship Ericsson, American wooden side-wheel paddle steamer (1852–1892)
- Ceramic heat cell, also known as caloric porous structure cell, a ceramic device that burns fuel without a flame, converting thermal energy into mechanical work
- Punsch, also known as Caloric Punch, an alcoholic beverage

== See also ==
- Calorie (disambiguation)
