= Ray Tracers =

1997 video game

- North American cover art
- Developer: Taito
- Publishers: JP: Taito; EU: Sony Computer Entertainment; NA: THQ
- Series: Chase
- Platform: PlayStation
- Release: JP: January 17, 1997; EU: July 1997; NA: March 5, 1998
- Genres: Racing, vehicular combat
- Mode: Single-player

Ray Tracers (Note: Japanese: レイ・トレーサー, Hepburn: Rei Torēsā) is a 1997 vehicular combat video game developed by Taito and released for the PlayStation console. THQ published the title for its North American release in 1998. Ray Tracers has been compared to Taito's own Chase H.Q. from 1988. It was re-released on the PlayStation Network.

== Gameplay ==
Gameplay consists of driving a car along a street. There is a timer on the top-left, which counts down. Enemies, in the form of robots, appear from the front and are damaged by ramming. Killing an enemy extends the player's time.

== Reception ==
Reception

Review scores
Publication	Score
Consoles +	88%
Computer and Video Games	3/5
Electronic Gaming Monthly	4.5/10 (Note: The four reviewers gave it individual scores of 3.0/10, 4.5/10, 6.0/10, and 4.5/10 respectively.)
Famitsu	23/40
Game Informer	7.5/10
GameSpot	5.4/10
Hyper	76%
IGN	7/10
PlayStation Official Magazine – UK	7/10
Official U.S. PlayStation Magazine	3/5

Ray Tracers received mixed reviews. While multiple critics praised the tight controls, strong sense of speed, high frame rate, and light sourcing effects, they almost unanimously concluded that the game is both excessively easy and excessively short, giving players no reason to buy it since they could easily finish it on a single rental and the replay value is minimal. Computer and Video Games lamented, "Fun though Ray Tracers is, there's just not enough to it. A real shame." Some also commented that the gameplay is too simplistic, to the point where it becomes monotonous even before one finishes the game. GamePro remarked that a multiplayer mode could have greatly increased Ray Tracer's lasting appeal, but without it the game became monotonous quickly. IGN was among the few publications to defend the game; while concurring that the gameplay is extremely simplistic, the reviewer felt that it was fun enough that players would enjoy popping it in now and then for casual gaming sessions despite its lack of concrete replay value.

The review team of Electronic Gaming Monthly were particularly negative about the game, with Kelly Rickards calling it "the most simplistic, monotonous and boring racing game I've played in quite some time", Dan Hsu saying he completed it in 20 minutes, and Crispin Boyer lamenting its lack of personality and the easiness of defeating the bosses. Both Boyer and Jeff Gerstmann (in a review for GameSpot) criticized the absurdity of the fighter jet and helicopter bosses, pointing out that there was no apparent reason for them to hug the road closely enough that the player car would ever have the opportunity to ram them. Game Informer gave it a favourable review. In Germany, MAN!AC praised the anime inspired graphics and called the racing exciting. In Japan, Famitsu gave it a score of 23 out of 40.
