= Chase H.Q.: Secret Police =

1999 video game

- North American box art
- Developers: Dreams Co. Ltd; ITL Co. Ltd
- Publishers: NA: Metro3D; EU: Gaga Communications Inc.; JP: Jorudan
- Series: Chase H.Q.
- Platform: Game Boy Color
- Release: NA: September 1999; EU: 1999; JP: May 26, 2000
- Genre: Vehicular combat
- Modes: Single-player, multiplayer

Chase H.Q.: Secret Police is a 1999 vehicular combat game developed by Dreams Co. Ltd and ITL Co. Ltd and published by Metro3D for the Game Boy Color. The game is an installment in the Chase H.Q. series, which began with a 1988 arcade game by Taito.

== Gameplay ==
Screenshot

Similar to the arcade game Chase H.Q., Secret Police is a racing game where the player is a police officer tasked with pursuing and apprehending a criminal in a car chase. The game involves vehicular combat as the player can run the criminal off the road, shoot them, or damage their car to defeat them. The game features ten stages in which the objectives differ, for instance, requiring the player to track and trap multiple suspects. Further to the design of the arcade game, Secret Police contains a strategy element in which the player first chooses a number of detectives in a team and places them at various locations on a map to set a course to intercept the suspect. If the detectives cross a course with the suspect, the game enters a chase sequence.

== Reception ==
Reception

Review scores
Publication	Score
AllGame	2/5
Game Informer	5.5
GameSpot	6.9
IGN	5/10
Total Game Boy Color	85%
Game Boy Xtreme	70%

Reception of Secret Police was mixed. Positive reception was focused upon the innovations made upon the original arcade game. Writing for Total Game Boy, Tom Sargent praised the variety of the gameplay, featuring "two games in one" through its map and chase stages. Frank Provo of GameSpot agreed, finding the strategy elements were "engrossing" and "the key to (the game's) lasting appeal". A negative review for Game Informer conceded that the additions were an "interesting new feature to (the) port of the arcade classic".

Negative reviews of Secret Police focused on the poor execution of the gameplay. Craig Harris of IGN dismissed the game as "flat-out dull", stating the "driving portion is rather boring", critiquing that "the camera shifts over to the side in a tight curve so that you can't see what's two pixels in front of (you)...it's a dirty trick to make the game harder to play." Game Boy Xtreme considered the game to be an "average conversion" of the source material, with "weak visuals". Game Informer critiqued the buggy performance of the game, highlighting the "shoddy" collision, noting "you can often pass right through other cars on the road unscathed".
