= Super Chase H.Q. =

1992 video game

- Developer: Taito
- Publisher: Taito
- Series: Chase
- Platforms: Arcade, Super NES
- Release: 1992
- Genres: Racing, vehicular combat
- Mode: Single-player
- Arcade system: Taito 68020-based

Super Chase H.Q. (Note: Japanese: スーパーチェイスクリミナルターミネーション, Hepburn: Sūpā Cheisu Kuriminaru Tāminēshon) is a 1992 arcade racing game developed and published by Taito. It is the third release in the Chase H.Q. series, and the sequel to Special Criminal Investigation. After the initial release in Japanese arcades under the title Super Chase: Criminal Termination, it was re-released in North America in 1993 for the Super Nintendo.

== Gameplay ==
While running on similar hardware as the prior two games, Super Chase differentiated itself by using an updated 68EC020 main CPU, and improved raster graphics.

It also was the first in the Chase H.Q. series to let players to drive the car from a first-person view, and have different vehicles available to drive. Nancy, the dispatcher from Chase H.Q. returns, this time, on a video screen inside the car before the start of the stage on a video screen inside her car.

== Reception ==
In Japan, Game Machine listed Super Chase: Criminal Termination on their April 15, 1993 issue as being the third most-successful upright/cockpit arcade unit of the month. In North America, Play Meter listed Super Chase to be the eighteenth most-popular arcade game at the time. The game was adapted for the Super Nintendo and released as Super Chase H.Q. in North America, and the new first-person view was considered "visually impressive". In a retrospective about the series, Wireframe credited the game for getting "the series back on track, switching the viewpoint to first-person perspective, and ramping up the absurdity".

Reviewing the Super NES version, Electronic Gaming Monthly gave Super Chase H.Q. a score of two eights and two sevens for a total of 30 out of 40, their reviewers praising the graphics and fast-paced driving action but criticizing the sound and lack of replay value.
