= Auto Test =

1954 electro-mechanical game

Auto Test is a 1954 educational electro-mechanical game that uses a video projector. Released by Capitol Projector, it was a driving test simulation that used film reel to project pre-recorded driving video footage, awarding the player points for making correct decisions as the footage is played. It was not a racing game, but was a driving simulation designed for educational purposes.
