= Sea Wolf (video game) =

1976 video game

- Arcade flyer
- Developer: Dave Nutting Associates
- Publishers: NA/EU: Midway; JP: Taito
- Designer: Dave Nutting
- Platforms: Arcade, Commodore 64, VIC-20
- Release: NA: April 1976; JP: July 1976; EU: 1976
- Genre: Shooter
- Arcade system: Midway 8080/BW

Sea Wolf is an arcade video game designed by Dave Nutting and released by Midway in 1976. It is a video game update of an electro-mechanical Midway game, Sea Devil, itself based on Sega's 1966 electro-mechanical arcade submarine simulator Periscope. The game was released in Japan by Taito. In Sea Wolf, the player, piloting an unseen submarine, launches torpedoes vertically in an attempt to sink ships moving horizontally across the screen before time runs out. The screen is viewed through a faux periscope mounted on the cabinet.

The game sold 10,000 arcade cabinets and was the highest-grossing arcade video game of 1976 and 1977 in the United States and Japan's fifth highest-grossing arcade video game of 1976.

Midway released a color arcade sequel, Sea Wolf II, in 1978. In 1982, Commodore International produced cartridge ports of Sea Wolf for the VIC-20 and then-new Commodore 64 computers.

== Gameplay ==
A game of Sea Wolf

The player looks through a large periscope to aim at ships moving across the virtual sea line at the top of the screen, using a thumb button on the right handle of the scope to shoot torpedoes. The periscope swivels to the right and left, providing horizontal motion of a targeting cross-hair. The cabinet features a mixture of video game and older electro-mechanical technology for player feedback. Using back-lit transparencies reflected inside the scope, the number of torpedoes remaining are displayed, as well as a red "RELOAD" light which illuminates momentarily when the player has launched five torpedoes. Additionally, when a ship is hit, a corresponding "explosion" light is reflected onto the screen image at the ship's approximate position. A blue overlay is affixed to the screen to provide a "water color" to the sea. Sounds include a sonar ping, the "whoosh" of launched torpedoes, torpedo explosions, and the klaxon sound of the PT boat racing across the screen.

Sea Wolf is time-limited, with the player having an opportunity to win bonus time by reaching an operator-set score. The player's score is shown on the bottom half of the screen as well as the high score, one of the first known instances of a high score in a video game. Targets include destroyers, a fast-moving PT boat, and mines floating across the screen that serve as obstructions.

== History ==
Sea Wolf was developed by Dave Nutting Associates head David Nutting and programmer Tom McHugh. The two had previously worked together on Gun Fight (1975), an adaptation of Taito’s Western Gun (1975) re-engineered with a microprocessor. The hardware for Gun Fight was developed by Jeffery Frederiksen, an Intel 8080-based system utilizing a framebuffer. They decided to use this hardware system for several subsequent games, including Sea Wolf.

David Nutting got the idea for Sea Wolf from distributor Joe Robbins, who suggested that they create a video game upgrade of the classic electro-mechanical game Periscope (1965). As with a number of prior target shooting games that had a submarine theme, a periscope viewing device directed the player's view onto the screen. The periscope had markers for depth level to help players judge the distance, as well as an analog graphical effect for the explosions.

According to programmer Tom McHugh, he got sick towards the very end of developing the game. The final stages of the program were put together by Jamie Fenton, but Fenton does not recall working on the game.

Sea Wolf is one of the first video games to include a high score feature, saving the highest value achieved prior to powering off. A button on the control panel allows the player to reset this score to zero.

== Reception ==
In the United States, Sea Wolf was the highest-grossing arcade video game for two years in a row: 1976 and 1977. It was the third highest-grossing arcade game of 1978 according to Play Meter, or the year's fourth highest according to RePlay.

In Japan, Sea Wolf was a commercial success for Taito. On the first annual Game Machine arcade chart, Sea Wolf was the fifth highest-grossing arcade video game of 1976 in Japan, below Taito's Ball Park (Tornado Baseball) and Speed Race DX (Wheels), Sega's Heavyweight Champ, and Breakout (licensed by Namco from Atari).

Sea Wolf eventually sold a total of 10,000 arcade cabinets. Sea Wolf II sold another 4,000 units.

== Legacy ==
Sea Wolf was followed by Sea Wolf II in 1978. In 1983, Epyx ported Sea Wolf II and another Midway game, Gun Fight, to the Atari 8-bit computers and released them in an "Arcade Classics" compilation.

In 2008, Coastal Amusements released a retro video redemption game based on the original Sea Wolf.

== High score ==
The current world record holder for Sea Wolf is Alan Radue with a score of 11,300 points. The record was set on October 2, 2011, at the Tranquility Base Arcade and verified by Twin Galaxies International on October 9.
