= Super Shot =

Basketball-themed arcade game

A mini-basketball game found in many arcades, Super Shot consists of a basket, that usually moves back and forth, and four to five basketballs to shoot. There are four different modes which affect the rate at which the basket moves. Each shot is worth either two or three points, depending on the distance between the shooter and the basket. There is also a time limit for each game, usually between 40 and 60 seconds.

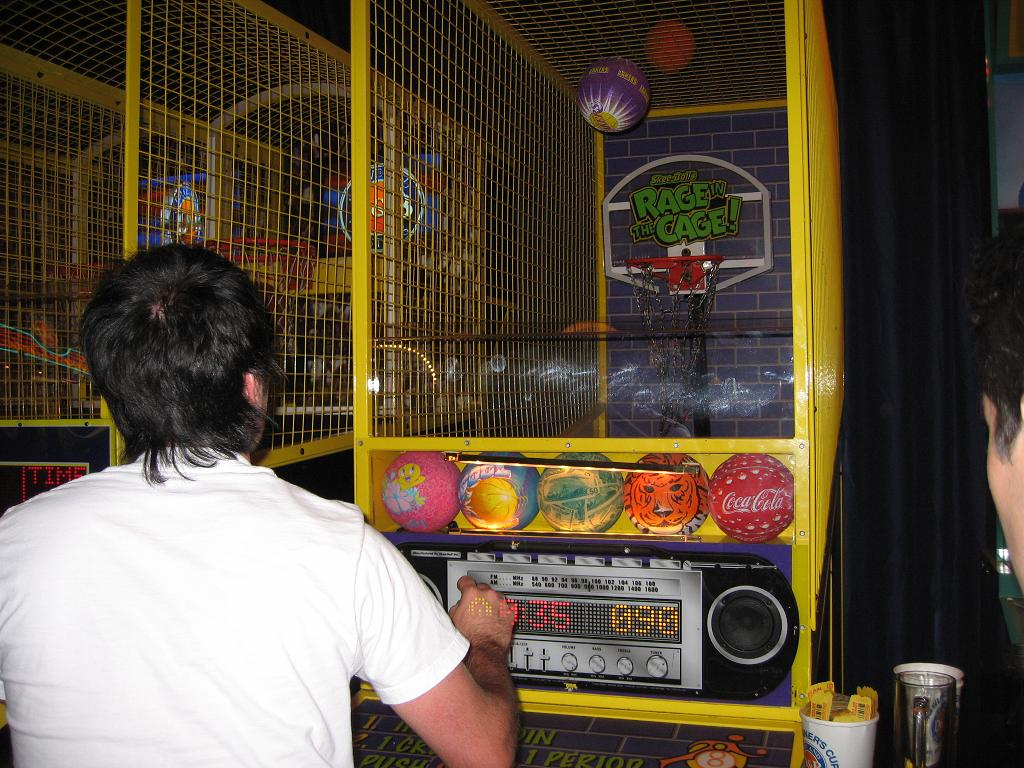
Man playing Supershot style basketball game

Super Shot typically costs anywhere between 25 cents a game to $2.00, depending on the arcades. It comes in a variety of different colors such as purple-orange, black-red, blue-yellow, CEC customized, etc. It also has different customizable options like add BONUS TIME, or BONUS TICKETS, etc.

== History ==
Hoop Shot, a basketball skill-toss electro-mechanical game manufactured by Doyle & Associates, was released for arcades in 1985. It became a hit, inspiring numerous imitators within a year. Arcade basketball games of this type became popular in the late 1980s.
