= Score (video games) =

Abstract quantity associated with a player or team in a game

A video of a player scoring in Solipskier

In video games, score refers to an abstract quantity associated with a player or team. Score is usually measured in the abstract unit of points, and events in the game can raise or lower the score of different parties. Most games with score use it as a quantitative indicator of success in the game, and in competitive games, a goal is often made of attaining a better score than one's opponents in order to win.

In video games that feature scoring, points are usually an optional, side component of gaming. Players may achieve points through normal gameplay, but their score will often not have an immediate relevance to the game itself. Instead, playing to beat a "high score" set by the game program, another player or oneself becomes an extra challenge, adding replay value.

In modern gaming, the presence of a score is not as ubiquitous as it was in the past. During the era of arcade games, when, because of the technical limitations of the time, games could not be "won" or "completed" but were instead endless cycles of continuous gameplay, points had a much greater relevance. Many modern games no longer keep track of scores, and many no longer feature an option to save or record high scores. However, some games, such as role-playing games, have experience points, skill points, and use money or treasure, which can all be used to buy or upgrade skills and objects.

In fighting games, scoring a very high number of points could result in unlockable players or modes. In some games, reaching certain scores gives an extra life, or a continue.

== Scoring ==
In puzzle games, scores are usually gained by solving the puzzles quickly. Higher scores can be gained by performing combos of puzzle solving. There is often a time bonus which can add extra points. The level number is often a multiplier on the points, so higher scores are possible on harder levels. Level multipliers can also be picked up in some games, to further multiply your points bonus.

In other games, points are typically gained from defeating monsters and enemies. When defeating a boss, a proportionally large number of points is usually rewarded. Extra points can be gained from gathering items, such as power-ups or other pick-ups.

Usually, when a player gets a certain number of points, they may get an extra life or go on to a higher level. Points can be often used as currency which can be redeemed for rewards and player upgrades.

== High score ==
The high score of a video game is usually the highest logged point value. Many games will have a list of several high scores, called the high score table or leaderboard.

=== History ===
Sea Wolf, the first video game to use the term "high score"

The concept of a high score first achieved cultural significance with the rise in popularity of pinball machines and electro-mechanical arcade games. Players who achieve a high score are often greeted with a congratulatory message and are able to enter their initials or name into the machine. Their score and name will remain there until someone "knocks" them off the high score list by achieving a higher score. For this reason, high scores are inherently competitive and may sometimes involve one-upmanship against other players.

The high score has a close association to the "free game". When in an arcade, many games will offer a player a free chance at another game if they achieve a high score. This has declined in popularity in recent years, as players are often allowed to play for as long as they can without losing, but not given free games even if they achieve a high score.

The first video game to use the term "high score" was Midway's Sea Wolf (1976). The game saved the highest score achieved on the cabinet, but could be reset by a player at any time by pressing a button on the machine.

The high score concept changed in July 1978 with the release of Taito's shoot 'em up Space Invaders, where high scores were determined by gamers playing for as long as they could to stay alive, as high scores kept rising. The popularity of Space Invaders stemmed in part from players returning to beat the current high score, as players could now compete with each other over who had the highest score. In December 1978, Exidy's Star Fire allowed the player to save their name as initials next to their high score. Since this data was stored in the machine's RAM, it was deleted every time the machine lost power, which in practice would almost invariably happen every night as operators preferred to leave the machines unplugged when the arcade was closed to avoid incurring unnecessary power costs.

The popularity of the high score made it nearly ubiquitous and a defining feature for many games. Magazines such as Nintendo Power and Sega Visions would often publish high scores submitted by their readers. The high score became most popular when, starting in 1982, the Twin Galaxies Scoreboard began to appear in the pages of Video Games Magazine, Joystik Magazine, Computer Games Magazine, VideoGiochi Magazine, Video Games Player Magazine and Electronic Fun Magazine. Later, in the 1990s, all performances would have to be videotaped to verify the achievement.

The high score also exists in online games in various forms. The spread of the Internet has made it possible to compete with the rest of the world, rather than the players of a single machine or game. Many modern games have the ability to post his/her high score to a central webpage. Online multiplayer games, especially first person shooters, real time strategies, and role-playing video games often have ranking systems. These new high score lists and ranking systems often are more complex than conventional high score lists. Some are based on tournaments, while others track game servers continuously, keeping statistics for all players.

Some games include default "high scores" that do not actually represent real players, but are displayed whenever the machine's memory is reset, often with generic initials such as "AAA". These scores often represent certain levels of achievement for a player to aspire to, ensuring that there is always something for players to compete with. Many video games also have default high scores built in, sometimes attributed to fictitious entities (e.g. Commander Keen) or to members of the game's development team.

=== In popular culture ===
The high score's prominence in video game culture and even mainstream society has led to various pieces of art and entertainment. There is a cartoon titled High Score. There is also a book entitled High Score! The Illustrated History of Electronic Games. A 2007 documentary, The King of Kong: A Fistful of Quarters, follows the attempts to beat the high score in Donkey Kong.

In an episode of the TV series Seinfeld, George is astonished to find that the Frogger machine he played as a teen still retains his high score. With the owners wanting to get rid of it, George decides to keep the machine for posterity, the catch being that he has to move the game without unplugging it, because if he unplugs the game the high score will be erased. Unfortunately, the machine is destroyed when he unsuccessfully tries to move it across the street in a spoof of the gameplay.

On September 24, 2005, Twin Galaxies issued Poster #59, which publicized a $1,000 prize to the first gamer who could break George Costanza's fictitious Frogger high score of 863,050 points.

On August 1, 1982, the Twin Galaxies Intergalactic Scoreboard issued a colorful poster that listed the world record high scores for more than two dozen arcade video games. The poster was distributed among arcades worldwide. This was the first poster (#1) in a series of colorful posters that continues today, with poster #131 issued in October, 2008.

In an episode of Friends, Chandler Bing puts in dirty words on all the high score positions on a Ms. Pac-Man machine. He then finds out that they are not blanked when the machine is reset, so he has to break all his high scores to remove the offending words. (This is not possible on an actual Ms. Pac-Man machine; such machines only record one high score and do not allow the winning player to enter initials.)

=== In the media ===
According to the Twin Galaxies Intergalactic Scoreboard, "high-score" attempts enjoyed as much press coverage as any other video game–related topic reported in the media during the 1982–1985 period. Though the media was often focused on the amazing growth of the video game industry, it was equally as fascinated with the human side of gaming, as typified by the "player vs. machine" showdowns that led to new world record high scores set on nearly a daily basis. In fact, Twin Galaxies reports that during that early era it was not unusual for there to be multiple new world records reported in the media on a single day.

== See also ==
- Time attack
- Speedrun
- Running up the score
