= Cyber Commando =

1994 video game

- Developer: Namco
- Publisher: Namco
- Platform: Arcade
- Release: JP: December 1994
- Genre: Vehicular combat
- Modes: Single-player, multiplayer
- Arcade system: Namco System 22

Cyber Commando (Note: Japanese: サイバーコマンド, Hepburn: Saibā Komando) is a 1994 vehicular combat video game developed and published by Namco for arcades. It was originally released only in Japan in December 1994. It is a sequel to Cyber Sled (1993) that uses the Namco System 22 hardware. Hamster Corporation released the game as part of their Arcade Archives series for the Nintendo Switch and PlayStation 4, as well as their Arcade Archives 2 series for the Nintendo Switch 2, PlayStation 5 and Xbox Series X/S in April 2026.

== Gameplay ==
The player controls one in six vehicles who are sent to stop a security computer malfunction in a space colony. The player maneuvers vehicles through a futuristic arena and fighting to kill opponents by shooting them with ammunition or bullets. A shield is available to block incoming bullets. Various power-ups are available throughout the game, which feature improved radar capabilities, extra missiles or recharging the player's shield. Players can quickly switch between a third-person and first-person viewing angle.
