= Mouse Trap (1981 video game) =

1981 video game

- Arcade flyer
- Developers: Exidy; Coleco (CV, INTV); James Wickstead Design Associates (2600)
- Publishers: Exidy; Coleco (2600, INTV); CBS Electronics (INTV)
- Designers: Howell Ivy (hardware); Larry W. Hutcherson (game)
- Programmer: Larry Hutcherson
- Platforms: Arcade, Atari 2600, ColecoVision, Intellivision
- Release: December 1981: Arcade; NA: December 1981 2600; NA: October 1982; EU: 1983 ColecoVision; NA: 1982; EU: 1983 Intellivision; EU: 1982; NA: January 1983
- Genre: Maze
- Modes: Single-player, multiplayer
- Arcade system: Universal Game Board V2

Mouse Trap is a maze video game developed by Exidy and released in arcades in 1981. It is similar to Pac-Man, with the main character replaced by a mouse, the dots with cheese, the ghosts with cats, and the energizers with bones. After collecting a bone, pressing a button briefly turns the mouse into a dog. Color-coded doors in the maze can be toggled by pressing a button of the corresponding color. A hawk periodically flies across the maze, unrestricted by walls.

Coleco released a conversion of Mouse Trap as a 1982 ColecoVision launch title, then later for the Intellivision and Atari 2600.

== Gameplay ==
A new maze full of cheese (arcade)

The player uses a four-position joystick to maneuver a mouse throughout a maze and eat pieces of cheese scattered along the paths. Six cats patrol the maze and chase the player, with two present at the outset and four more being released one at a time. The maze has three sets of color-coded doors, which the player can open or close by pressing the corresponding buttons in order to block the cats' approach. The player can also escape the cats by entering the "IN" box at the center of the screen, which will teleport the mouse to one of the four corners at random. Contact between the mouse and a cat costs the player one life.

The player can pick up bones from the corners of the maze, then use them later by pressing a fourth button. Doing so turns the mouse into a dog for a short time, during which it can eat the cats for bonus points and temporarily remove them from the maze, but the cats will move at a faster speed when they re-spawn into the maze. Unused bones carry over from one level to the next and from one life to the next.

At times, a hawk will fly through the maze, trying to catch the player. The hawk can eat both the mouse and the dog, costing the player one life, and it can fly over the walls. It can only be foiled by using the "IN" box, which causes it to fly randomly and then leave the maze.

At any given time, a bonus object is present in the maze and can be eaten for points, causing a more valuable object to appear elsewhere. The bonus sequence restarts when the player either loses a life or eats the most valuable object in the sequence. When all of the cheese has been eaten, the player earns a bonus and moves to the next level.

== Ports ==
Coleco ported Mouse Trap to its own ColecoVision console, with 15 prizes instead of 32, an option to leave the hawk out, and different sound effects. Coleco's Intellivision port adds an audio warning when a cat is about to enter the maze. The score differs: cheese is worth 90 points, and cats are worth 100, 300, 500, 700, 900 and 1100 points.

Coleco also ported Mouse Trap to the Atari 2600, simplifying graphics and gameplay. The maze is more squat with brighter walls, and doors form a single-colored set that flickers. Gameplay basics are the same, but the hawk, the "IN" area, and the bonus prizes are missing; there are three cats instead of six, and all doors move at once. Additionally, pressing the single joystick button will switch the doors' positions or activate a stored bone, depending on if the player does a long press or a quick tap. Scoring is also reduced significantly: cheese is worth 1 point instead of 10 points, cats are worth 10 points and do not increase in value, and clearing a maze awards only 100 points.

== Reception ==
In his 1982 book How to Beat the Video Games, Michael Blanchet said that Mousetrap's gameplay "closely resembles that of Pac-Man with a couple of very interesting twists". According to Electronic Games in 1983, Mouse Trap was unsuccessful because arcade owners viewed it as another "basic" maze game.

== See also ==
- Lady Bug
- Lock 'n' Chase
