= Cyber Sled =

1993 video game

- Arcade flyer
- Developer: Namco
- Publishers: Namco: NA: Namco Hometek (PS); EU: Sony Computer Entertainment (PS)
- Composer: Shinji Hosoe
- Platforms: Arcade, PlayStation
- Release: Arcade: JP: March 27, 1993; NA: October 1993; EU: 1993; PlayStation: JP: January 27, 1995; NA: October 18, 1995; PAL: November 10, 1995
- Genres: Vehicular combat, shooter
- Modes: Single player, Multiplayer

Cyber Sled (Note: Japanese: サイバースレッド, Hepburn: Saibā Sureddo) is a 1993 vehicular combat shooter video game developed and published by Namco for arcades. It later received a port to the PlayStation. It later received a sequel in 1994, Cyber Commando.

== Gameplay ==
In-game screenshot showing the player about to take out a nearby enemy

Cyber Sled involves maneuvering a hovercraft style tank through a futuristic arena and fighting to eliminate an opponent (either another player or the computer). Various power-ups are available throughout the game, which feature improved radar, extra missiles, and shield re-charging. There are walls and other obstacles in the arena, which can be useful for hiding as well as a hindrance, and some of which can be destroyed. Each player can choose from among eight different tanks, which vary from slow but heavily shielded, to quick but vulnerable. Player's viewpoint can be either from the cockpit, or from behind the vehicle. The game included three options for "atmospheric conditions": day, night, and fog; the conditions changed the distance at which opponents were visible and how much the players were required to utilize the "radar" display.

Each player has two tank-style analog joysticks, each with a finger and thumb trigger. The finger trigger releases a steady stream of bullets, but if held down will overheat and stop working for a short period of time. The thumb trigger releases a limited number of missiles.

The game is rendered in 3D polygons and is viewed from a third-person perspective by default. There is a viewpoint button that allows the player to switch to an alternative first-person perspective.

== Release ==
=== Arcade ===
The arcade game was first published by Namco in Japan on March 27, 1993 and later in North America by Namco America in October. The game was also released in Europe during 1993. The original arcade version was released for the Wii Virtual Console in Japan on May 19, 2009.

=== PlayStation ===
A console version of Cyber Sled was released for the PlayStation in 1995. It was originally slated as a launch game for the PlayStation. It features more characters than the arcade version, and a choice between the original arcade graphics, or a more realistic texture mapped mode. The PlayStation version was released through the PlayStation Store in Japan on June 26, 2013, and in North America on January 28, 2014.

== Reception ==
Reception

Review scores
Publication	Score	
Publication	Arcade	PS
AllGame	2/5	2/5
Computer and Video Games	82%	
Edge		4/10
Famitsu		29/40; 8/10
GamePro		14/20
IGN		5/10
Next Generation		2/5
Dengeki PlayStation		60/100, 70/100, 65/100, 85/100

Award
Publication	Award
AMOA Awards	Most Innovative New Technology (nominated)

=== Arcade ===
Game Machine listed Cyber Sled as being the second most popular arcade game in Japan during October 1993. Play Meter listed it to be the twenty-second most-popular arcade game at the time in North America during December 1993. By January 1994, Namco America were reporting average monthly collections between $827 and $1,230 per unit at select US arcades.

Upon release in arcades, Rick Skews of Computer and Video Games magazine gave the arcade game a positive review in early 1994. He compared the game favorably with Atari's classic arcade first-person shooter tank game Battlezone (1980), considering Cyber Sled to be a multiplayer 3D polygon successor to Battlezone. He called Cyber Sled "an enjoyable coin-op" that is "most fun when played with a friend". He scored it 82% for graphics, 76% for sound, and 84% for gameplay, for an overall 82% score.

At the 1994 AMOA Awards, the game was nominated for Most Innovative New Technology.

=== PlayStation ===
Upon release on consoles in 1995, Famicom Tsūshin (Famitsu) scored the PlayStation version of the game a 29 out of 40, giving it an 8 out of 10 in their Reader Cross Review. GamePro criticized it for its lack of originality and unimpressive graphics, saying it "looks like something you could've played on a 16-bit system", but concluded that "it's fine, fast-paced fun, especially in two-player mode". Next Generation reviewed the PlayStation version of the game, rating it two stars out of five, and wrote that "this title didn't need to come home at all, but if you're an absolute die-hard fan of the original coin-op, the one-player mode is a close match".
