= Crime City (video game) =

1989 video game

- Arcade flyer
- Developer: Taito
- Publisher: Taito
- Platform: Arcade
- Release: JP: September 1989; NA: October 1989
- Genre: Run and gun
- Modes: Single-player, multiplayer

Crime City (Note: Japanese: クライムシティ, Hepburn: Kuraimu Shiti) is a 1989 run and gun video game developed and published by Taito for arcades. It was released in Japan in September 1989 and in North America in October 1989. It is a spin-off of Taito's Chase H.Q. (1988). Hamster Corporation released the game as part of their Arcade Archives series for the Nintendo Switch and PlayStation 4 in September 2024.

== Gameplay ==
The player controls police officers Tony Gibson and Raymond Broady, who return from Chase H.Q., as they navigate levels on foot to track down gang members. They can be equipped with a variety of weapons, including pistols, rifles and shotguns with limited ammunition; they can also punch enemies at close range. The player is killed and loses a life when hit by a bullet, regardless of their hit points which are affected by running into enemies. Occasional third-person shooter segments are available. Two players can play simultaneously. The game has a unique high score entry screen, as the player can draw a shape by shooting bullets instead of simply entering initials.
