= Flip and Flop =

1983 video game

- Commodore 64 box cover
- Developer(s): First Star Software
- Publisher(s): First Star Software; State Soft
- Designer(s): Jim Nangano
- Platform(s): Atari 8-bit, Commodore 64
- Release: 1983: Atari; 1984: C64
- Genre(s): Platform
- Mode(s): Single-player, multiplayer

Flip and Flop is an isometric platform game for Atari 8-bit computers designed by Jim Nangano and published in 1983 by First Star Software. Statesoft released a Commodore 64 port the following year. The Commodore 64 box cover, which features a photo of acrobats, does not relate to the game itself, changes the name to Flip & Flop; it remains Flip and Flop on the title screen.

== Gameplay ==
Gameplay screenshot

The isometric, scrolling playfield consists platforms connected by ladders. Players alternately control Flip, a kangaroo who jumps around on the platforms, and Mitch, an ape who hangs under the platforms. Flip is chased by a zookeeper and Mitch is chased by a net, both of which are lured by sticky squares that delay them for several seconds. The player loses a life for being caught or falling off the playfield. The goal is to flip over all of the marked squares by moving over them. Every five levels there is a short sequence with a small circus presentation.

Levels become progressively more complicated. In Level 13, the maximum playing field size is reached. Later. marked squares must be uncovered twice and there may not be sticky fields to slow the zookeeper or the net.

== Reception ==
In 1984, German magazine 64'er stated that it was the best example of the genre.

== Legacy ==
Clown-O-Mania (1989) is an extended clone for the Amiga and Atari ST.
