= Caloric (automobile) =

American automobile company

The Caloric Motorcycle Company of Chicago was founded in 1898 as a motorcycle company. It later moved into auto production in 1903.

== History ==
The Caloric Motorcycle company was founded in 1898 by Charles Dickinson, L.F. Douglass, and Henry B. Babson at 107 Madison Street in Chicago, Illinois. Their program statement of building gas, electric, and steam cars was never fulfilled. It was not until 1903 that their first car was produced. To start the engine, a blow torch had to be used to heat the cylinder head until it was red hot. In 1904, the company merged with Auto Motor Cycle Company and announced no more car production.

== Models ==
| Year | Cylinders | Horsepower | Wheelbase |
|---|---|---|---|
| 1903–1904 Rbt. | Two | 4.5 | 66" |
| 1903–1904 Rbt. | Two | 6.5 | 66" |
| 1903–1904 Coupe | Three | 9 | N/A |
