= Vehicular combat game =

Video game genre

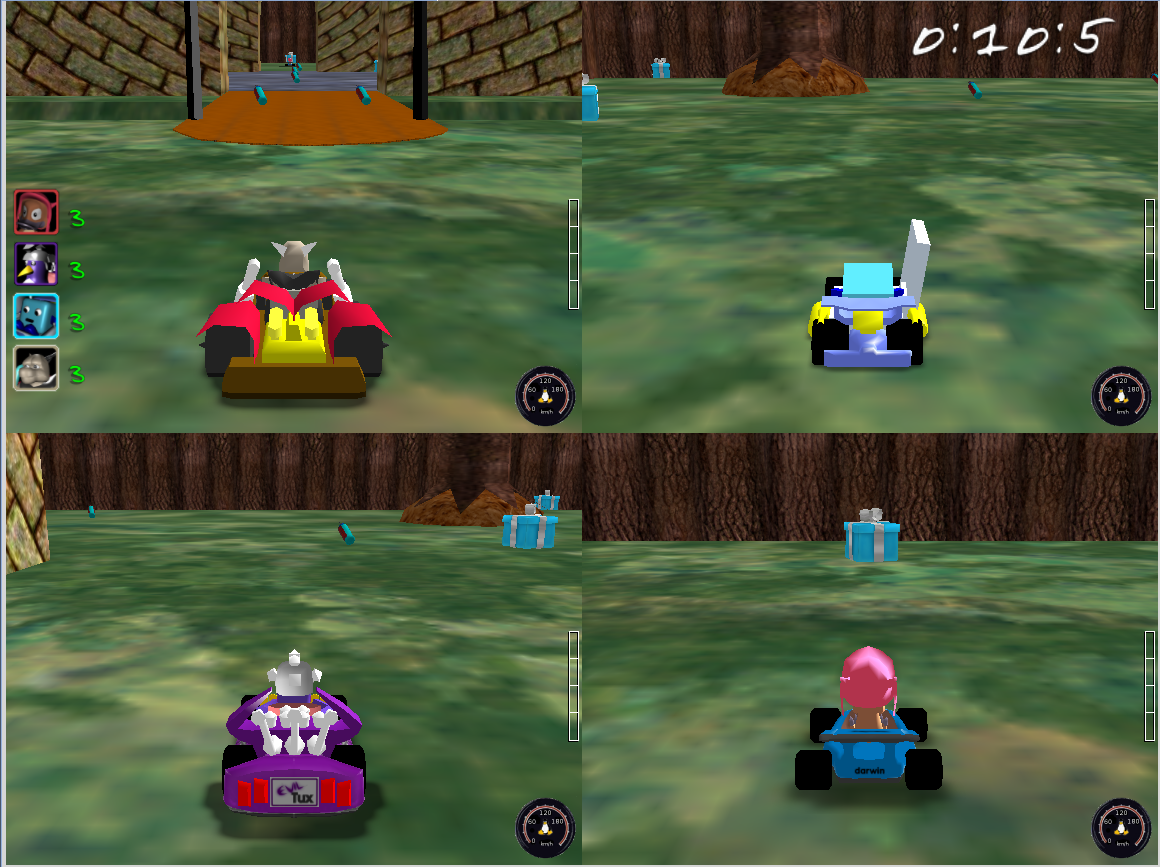
Split screen showing the views of four different players on the game Supertuxkart

A vehicular combat game (or car combat game) is a vehicle simulation video game where the primary gameplay objectives include vehicles armed with weapons attempting to destroy vehicles controlled by the CPU or by opposing players. The genre normally features a variety of different vehicles available for play, each with its own strengths, weaknesses, and special attack abilities. Players may also unlock hidden vehicles by completing certain in-game tasks. Games may include racing themes, but they are generally secondary to the action.

== Gameplay ==
Vehicular combat games normally follow a simple play pattern; the player must defeat increasing numbers of not very skilled enemies before facing off against a final, super-powerful, boss character. Vehicular combat games differ from traditional racing games both in the combat aspect and in the general lack of any set path for players to follow, instead allowing them to explore each level at their leisure. The complexity and strategy required to complete games vary, from the careful resource maintenance and intense story-driven plotlines of the Interstate '76 series to straightforward smashups like WWE Crush Hour. Often, the primary plot will involve a contest or competition of some sort, encouraging the various characters to fight and destroy one another to obtain a reward. The Twisted Metal series has been attributed as the first "true" vehicular combat game, without cartoony graphics as seen in kart racing games.

== History ==
In the 1970s, several arcade games reversed racing game conventions by making vehicle collisions the objective of the gameplay. The concept of ramming cars dates back to Sega's electro-mechanical games Stunt Car (1970) and Dodgem Crazy (1972). The concept began appearing in arcade video games several years later, such as Atari's Crash 'N Score (1975) and Exidy's Destruction Derby (1975) and Death Race (1976).

Early examples of pseudo-3D car combat games include Atari's RoadBlasters (1987), Taito's Chase H.Q. (1988) and Sculptured Software's Fatal Run (1990). Vehicular combat games featuring cars were particularly well-represented on PlayStation consoles, with 3D vehicle combat games such as Destruction Derby, Twisted Metal, Wipeout and Rollcage.

In the 2020s, vehicular combat games are largely considered a "dead" genre due to their lack of prominent entries, despite some games still being released in the modern day, such as Destruction AllStars.

== See also ==
- List of vehicular combat games
- Car Wars
