= Chase H.Q. =

1988 video game

- North American arcade flyer
- Developer: Taito
- Publisher: Taito
- Designer: Hiroguki Sakou
- Programmers: Takeshi Ishizashi; Takeshi Murata; Kyoji Shimamoto
- Composer: Takami Asano
- Series: Chase
- Platform: Arcade: Amiga, Amstrad CPC, Atari ST, Commodore 64, ZX Spectrum, Famicom, PC Engine/TurboGrafx-16, MSX, Game Boy, Master System, Game Gear, Genesis/Mega Drive, X68000, Super NES, FM Towns, Sega Saturn
- Release: September 1988: Arcade; JP: September 1988; EU: October 1988; NA: November 1988 Amiga, Atari ST, C64, CPC, ZX Spectrum; EU: December 4, 1989 Famicom; JP: December 8, 1989 PC Engine/TurboGrafx-16; JP: January 26, 1990; NA: November 1992 MSX; ESP: February 1990 Game Boy; NA: December 1, 1990; JP: January 11, 1991; EU: April 1991 Master System; EU: 1990 Game Gear; JP: March 8, 1991; EU: August 1991; NA: February 1992 Genesis/Mega Drive; JP: October 23, 1992; NA: February 1993 X68000; JP: October 1992 Super NES; JP: November 26, 1993; NA: December 1993; PAL: 1993 FM Towns; JP: 1993 Saturn; JP: August 9, 1996
- Genre: Vehicular combat
- Mode: Single-player
- Arcade system: Taito Z System

Chase H.Q. (Note: Japanese: チェイスH.Q.; "Chase Headquarters") is a 1988 vehicular combat video game developed and published by Taito for arcades. The player assumes the role of a police officer named Tony Gibson, member of the "Chase Special Investigation Department". Along with his partner, Raymond Broady, he must stop fleeing criminals in high-speed pursuits in a black Porsche 928.

Chase H.Q. was ported to many home computers by Ocean Software in 1989, including versions for the ZX Spectrum, Amstrad CPC, Commodore 64, MSX, Amiga and Atari ST. Taito produced versions for the Family Computer (1989), Game Boy (1990), Master System (1990), TurboGrafx-16 (1990), Game Gear (1991), and Saturn (1996). It was released for PlayStation 2 in Japan in 2007 as part of Taito Memories II Volume 2.

The game was a commercial success, becoming Japan's highest-grossing dedicated arcade game of 1989 while also becoming a hit overseas for arcades and home systems. The game was also well received by critics. It was followed by three arcade-based sequels: Special Criminal Investigation (1989), Super Chase H.Q. (1992) and Chase H.Q. 2 (2007). Two spin-offs were also released: Crime City (1989) and Quiz H.Q. (1990).

== Gameplay ==
At the start of each level, the player drives a Porsche 928 and is informed who they are pursuing, a great distance away: They must apprehend the criminal before their time limit expires. The criminal's car is constantly moving away, so if the player repeatedly crashes or drives too slowly, the criminal will escape. The road splits at some points during the game, and the correct turn must be taken, otherwise it will take longer to catch the criminal. When their vehicle is reached, the time limit is extended; the vehicle must be rammed a number of times until the criminal is forced to stop, then is arrested.

The game includes five levels. Both the initial time limit to reach the criminal and the time extension to ram the criminal are 60, 65, or 70 seconds.

When Nancy at Chase HQ (at the start of every level) calls on the radio, the frequency is often between 144 and 148 MHz. This is actually the 2-meter band of amateur or ham radio frequencies.

Although it is superficially similar in technology to Sega's Out Run, Chase HQ features significant technical advancements over that title in the presentation of perspective, hills and track splits.

Villains (for arcade versions):

1. Ralph, the Idaho Slasher (White Lotus Esprit)
2. Carlos, the New York armed robber (Yellow Lamborghini Countach)
3. Chicago pushers (Silver Porsche 911)
4. L.A. kidnapper (Blue Ferrari 288 GTO)
5. Eastern Bloc Spy (Red Porsche 928)

The last villain's car is always listed as unidentified.

If the level is completed, bonus points are as follows: if completed without continuing, 100,000 times level in play, otherwise, 10,000; plus, 5,000 per second saved for completing level. A 5,000,000-point award is collected for beating the game.

== Home releases ==
Stage 1 in the Atari ST version of Chase H.Q. The Player's black Porsche 928 accelerates past 300 km/h while an on-screen arrow marks the criminals' vehicle up ahead.

Ocean Software released versions of the game for the ZX Spectrum, Amstrad CPC, Commodore 64, Commodore Amiga and Atari ST in December 1989. The MSX version was released in February 1990 only in Spain, roughly one month later after the launch of the rest of Ocean's versions in that market.

Taito produced conversions (known as Taito Chase H.Q.) for the Family Computer (1989), Game Boy (1990), Master System (1990), TurboGrafx-16 (1990) and Game Gear (1991). In 1992, it was released on the Sega Genesis as Chase H.Q. II (known as Super H.Q. in Japan and Chase HQ II overseas), with some minor changes, including alternative player vehicles.

In December 1990, the game was included on the Wheels Of Fire compilation, which also featured Hard Drivin, Power Drift and Turbo OutRun on the Commodore 64. In June 1991, the game was released on the Power Up compilation, which also featured also on the C64 Altered Beast, Turrican, Rainbow Islands and X-Out.

In 1991, the game was released for the FM Towns.

In 1993, Taito released Super Chase H.Q. (known in Japan as Super H.Q. Criminal Chaser) for the Super NES. Unlike other home versions, it is played in first person perspective and is based upon Super Chase: Criminal Termination rather than the original Chase H.Q. Gameplay is modeled on the original with some aspects of S.C.I. incorporated. A PAL version of Super Chase H.Q. was released exclusively in Australia in 1993 by Mattel (Nintendo's ANZ distributor until 1994) and re-released by Nintendo Australia thereafter. There is also a Super Chase H.Q. for the Game Boy, which was released exclusively in North America, in 1994. The game is similar to the Game Boy's Taito Chase H.Q. (1991).

In 1996, Taito released an emulation of the arcade original for the Sega Saturn in Japan, bundled together with Special Criminal Investigation on one disc.

In 1999, Chase H.Q.: Secret Police was released for the Game Boy Color.

In July 2008, the TurboGrafx-16 version of the game was re-released on the Wii Virtual Console.

== Reception ==
Contemporary reception
Review scores
Publication	Scores			
Publication	Arcade	Computer	Console	Handheld
ACE	Positive	840 (AMI); 868 (ZX)	928 (PCE)	
Computer + Video Games	Positive	93% (AMI); 93% (ST); 97% (ZX); 36% (C64); 97% (CPC)	86% (SMS)	31% (GB); 90% (GG)
Crash		95% (ZX)		
Famitsu			24/40 (Famicom); 18/40 (SMD); 30/40 (PCE)	23/40 (GG)
Génération 4		92% (AMI); 92% (ST)	85% (PCE)	
Joystick		92% (AMI); 92% (CPC); 90% (ST)	89% (PCE); 93% (SMS)	83% (GG)
Sinclair User	9/10	96% (ZX)		
The Games Machine		840/1000 (AMI); 868/1000 (ZX)		
Tilt			(SMS)	
Your Sinclair		94% (ZX)		
Commodore User	9/10	70% (AMI)		
Awards
Publication	Awards			
Gamest Awards	Hit Game of the Year (10th)			
Golden Joystick Awards	Best 8-Bit Coin-Op Conversion, Best 8-Bit Soundtrack			
Your Sinclair	Readers' Top Game of All Time, Megagame			
Computer and Video Games	C+VG Hit			
Crash	Crash Smash			
Sinclair User	SU Classic			

=== Commercial ===
In Japan, Game Machine listed Chase H.Q. as the second most successful upright arcade cabinet of November 1988. It went on to become Japan's highest-grossing dedicated arcade game of 1989. In the United Kingdom, it was a hit in the arcades, becoming the top coin-on arcade game at one point.

The home computer conversions topped the UK sales chart in Christmas 1989. The ZX Spectrum version reached number two on the UK sales charts in early 1990, behind Rainbow Islands.

=== Critical ===
The arcade game was well received by critics. Computer and Video Games gave it a positive review, stating "at last" a "racing game with something more to do than just whizzing around a track to beat the course time". They concluded that it is "fast and challenging with great graphics" and "good clear sound effects" and is "definitely a winner". ACE said that the "Out Run theme keeps being expanded and presented in different ways" like Power Drift but considered Chase HQ better than the former. They concluded that the game's driving and violence is "a winning coin-up combination". Crash said it "is a great game" and "the ultimate arcade version of cops-and-robbers movies". According to Arcade History, it "was arguably the first sprite-scaled racer since" Out Run "to truly capture the gaming public's imagination".

The home computer conversions were also mostly well received by critics. The 16-bit Amiga and Atari ST versions received positive reviews, while the 8-bit ZX Spectrum and Amstrad CPC conversions received high review scores and are generally recognised as the most accurate and most playable of the Ocean Software home computer releases. All three of the ZX Spectrum magazines awarded it 94% or above, praising the speed of the game and the originality. Crash gave the game 95%, while Sinclair User awarded it 96%. On the other hand, the 8-bit Commodore 64 conversion received a generally negative reception.

The Master System conversion was well received by critics. Computer and Video Games said the "gameplay is as exciting as it was in the arcades" and "the high-speed thrills of this conversion" makes this game worth to look at it.

=== Accolades ===
At Japan's 1989 Gamest Awards, the arcade version was nominated for Hit Game of the Year, for which it was voted 10th place. According to an Ocean Software advert in 1989, the arcade version was voted Arcade Game of the Year.

At the 1989/1990 Golden Joystick Awards, the 8-bit home computer versions were awarded Best 8-Bit Coin-Op Conversion and Best 8-Bit Soundtrack. The Spectrum version also topped Computer and Video Games' "The Best Games of '89" list (along with Super Mario Bros. 2). The Spectrum version was voted number 1 in the Your Sinclair poll of Readers' Top 100 Games of All Time in 1993.

== Records ==
Brian Kuh from Weirs Beach, New Hampshire holds the official arcade world record with a score of 3,596,680 points achieved on 1 June 2006 at Funspot Family Fun Center, Weirs Beach, New Hampshire. Robert Gray from Dumfriesshire, Scotland holds the official MAME world record with a score of 11,490,280 points achieved on 13 June 2010.

== Legacy ==
Chase H.Q. was successful enough to earn two arcade-based sequels - the widely released Special Criminal Investigation released in 1989 and the extremely rare Super Chase: Criminal Termination released in 1992. It also earned two spin-offs - the run and gun Crime City, and the quiz game Quiz H.Q..

Special Criminal Investigation expands on the original with the addition of guns - the passenger can rise out of the T-top of his Nissan 300ZX Z32 and shoot at oncoming targets. To take advantage of this, enemies are placed throughout the level and will attempt to shoot at or ram the player as they attempt to pursue the main criminal. Deviating from the relatively realistic tracks on offer in the original, the sequel features pursuits through waterfalls and unfinished sections of elevated highway.

Super Chase: Criminal Termination was the third arcade release in the Chase H.Q. series, released in 1992.

The 1997 PlayStation game Ray Tracers, developed and released by Taito, has been described as "more or less a follow up" to the game, with "only a few differences" such as a different speed-boost system and a greater variety of targets.

In February 2006, Chase H.Q.: Nancy Yori Kinkyuu Renraku (Chase H.Q. - An Urgent Call From Nancy) was presented at the Arcade Operator's Union (AOU) trade show in Tokyo. It was shown again at AOU 2007. The game was released as Chase H.Q. 2 in December 2007.

Saint Etienne recorded a demo dance track called "Chase HQ" that was inspired by Chase H.Q. It includes samples of the "Oh man!" and "Punch the pedal!" exclamations from the game action. The track was released as a bonus track on the 2009 Deluxe reissue of the band's 1991 album, Foxbase Alpha.

Chase HQ's gameplay, which involved ramming the enemy car while avoiding oncoming traffic, has been cited as a precursor to the gameplay of later titles such as Driver and Burnout.
