= Clowns (video game) =

1978 video game

- C64 cover art
- Developer: Midway
- Publishers: Midway; Commodore
- Platforms: Arcade, VIC-20, Commodore 64
- Release: Arcade: NA: 1978; VIC-20: NA: 1982; Commodore 64: NA: 1983
- Modes: Single-player, multiplayer

Clowns is a black and white arcade game released by Midway Manufacturing in 1978. It is similar to Exidy's Circus from the prior year, in which the player controls a seesaw to propel two clowns into the air, catching balloons situated in three rows at the top of the screen. It was released on cartridge for VIC-20 in 1982 and for the Commodore 64 in 1983.

== Gameplay ==
Players start with two clowns and they get to control when and where they are propelled into the air, using the momentum of the seesaw. The goal is to prevent them from falling to the ground, or else the level is lost. Players get three lives and can earn more after getting a certain number of points. Getting to the center ring at the top of the sky, while gaining points from popping balloons, will help players complete levels. As the player advances to the next level, hazards and objects will start appearing in the air trying to hurt the clowns.
