= Demolition Derby (1984 video game) =

1985 Video game

- Flyer
- Developer: Bally Midway
- Publisher: Bally Midway
- Platform: Arcade
- Release: NA: April 1985
- Genre: Racing
- Modes: Single-player, multiplayer
- Arcade system: Bally Midway MCR III

Demolition Derby is a racing game developed by Bally Midway and released as an arcade video game in 1985.

== Gameplay ==
The player takes part in a demolition derby. Hit other cars in the radiator to damage them, while avoiding being hit in one's own radiator. Power-ups include wrenches, screwdrivers and car keys.

A notable feature of the multiplayer mode was the ability to enter a game while it is in progress; the message "CAR ENTERING DERBY" would appear on screen.

== Reception ==
Demolition Derby was listed in the book 1001 Video Games You Must Play Before You Die.

== See also ==
- Destruction Derby (1975), also released by Chicago Coin under the name Demolition Derby
