= Cheyenne (video game) =

1984 video game

- Developer: Exidy
- Publisher: Exidy
- Platform: Arcade
- Release: NA: 1984
- Genre: Shooting gallery
- Modes: Up to 2 players, alternating turns
- Arcade system: Exidy 440; CPU:

Cheyenne is a video game manufactured by Exidy and released in arcades in 1984. In this western style shooting game, the player must guide and protect "Buster Badshot" through various scenes of danger that take place in the old west, using the light gun. The gameplay is similar to Exidy's Crossbow.

== Gameplay ==
Screenshot

=== Stages ===
Each level has at least three stages that can be selected in any order by shooting the corresponding hanging picture. The stages are all based in classic old western locales, such as graveyards, canyons, saloons, mines, deserts, forests, ghost towns, and the like. Once all the stages in a level have been completed, the player will then move on to a bonus "Target Practice" stage. If the player hits all the objects in this stage within the time limit, they are awarded a "Bonus Buster" - an extra life - and allowed to proceed to the next level.

=== Enemies ===
Throughout each stage, Buster is attacked by many enemies and will find himself in a variety of perilous situations. The player must shoot each and any of these dangers before they can harm Buster. Objects that can be shot include knives, arrows, bullets, cannonballs, shovels, and bombs, as well as ghosts, falling boulders, and errant mine carts. Buster will also be attacked by wild animals such as bats, beavers, bears, coyotes, bison, wildcats, wolves, skunks, raccoons, birds, and rats, all of which the player must shoot in order to protect Buster. In addition to these perils, Buster will also encounter gangs of outlaws, which can contain anywhere from two to four members. Outlaws are easily distinguished from other characters due to their flashing colors, and all of them must be “captured” (shot) to complete a stage. Once the player meets this condition, they will be returned to the stage's introduction screen, in which iron bars are placed over “Wanted” posters of each outlaw, all of which have “PAID” stamped on them. From here, the player moves back to the level's stage select screen.

=== Scoring ===
Each captured outlaw rewards the player with points, which are expressed as dollars in-game. The first captured outlaw is worth $100, the second $250, and from there the reward for each outlaw captured increases by $250.

== Credits ==
The credits screen shows abbreviations of the game development team:

- LWH = Larry Hutcherson, Level Programmer
- NGI = Nick Ilyin, Lead Programmer
- VIC = Victor Tolomei, Lead Programmer
- LYN = Lynn Pointer, CG Artist
- KEN = Ken Nicholson, Sound Designer; Level Designer
- HEC = Hector Galindo, Artist
- RAY = Ray Maninang, Cabinet Artist
- MIK = Mike Craven, Artist
- HAI = Howell Ivy, Exidy 440 hardware designer

== Legacy ==
An NES port by American Game Cartridges was planned, but was not released.
