= CalorieKing =

Online weight loss club and software developer

CalorieKing Wellness Solutions, Inc.
- Type: Private
- Industry: health/fitness
- Founded: Australia (1973)
- Headquarters: La Mesa, California, US
- Key people: Keith McGuinness, CEO; Allan Borushek, Founder
- Number of employees: 25
- Website: www.calorieking.com

CalorieKing is an online weight loss club and software developer with a program centred on healthy eating and exercise ("calories in, calories out"). The company offers products and services tailored specifically for the United States, British, and Australian markets. As well as offering help for people who wish to lose weight, there are also programs and support for those who want to maintain their current weight, or to gain weight. The web sites' resources also include forums, and an extensive library of recipes and health and weight loss related articles contributed by company staff as well as other organisations and contributors.

In addition to its web site, the company also produces personal computer software and several popular books. Many of its products are based on the CalorieKing food database, which claims to contain over 100,000 foods in the American version and 20,000 foods in the Australian version.

== History ==
CalorieKing was founded as Family Health Publications in 1973 in Australia by Allan Borushek, biochemist and clinical dietitian, with the publication of the first Australian Calorie, Fat, & Carb Counter. In 1988, the book was published in the United States, selling more than 10,000,000 copies. 1998 saw the launch of the company's web site, CalorieKing.com; its Australian sister-site DietClub.com.au was launched in 1997 and later rebranded as CalorieKing.com.au.

In July 2007, the company announced an alliance with the Joslin Diabetes Center to promote type 2 diabetes awareness, prevention, and management, and to build a culturally specific Latino food database.
