= Chicago Coin =

American pinball table manufacturer

Chicago Coin was one of the early major manufacturers of pinball tables founded in Chicago, Illinois. The company was founded in 1932 by Samuel H. Gensburg and Samuel Wolberg to operate in the coin-operated amusement industry. In December 1976, Gary Stern and Sam Stern purchased the assets of the Chicago Coin Machine Division as it was then called to found Stern Electronics, Inc. They also produced various arcade games during the 1960s to 1970s.

== History ==
Sam Gensburg founded Chicago Coin Machine Exchange with brother-in-law Sam Wolberg and third partner Lou Koren, a company which had a business of trade-ins for coin-operated games. In 1931, Sam Genburg's brothers Louis Gensburg, David Gensburg, and Meyer Gensburg had founded Genco as an amusement manufacturer and Samuel decided to enter that business by establishing Chicago Coin Machine Exchange (later renamed Chicago Coin Machine Company). The company started off by making replacement boards for early pinball games before creating the table Blackstone (1933) which was manufactured by a partner named Stoner. In 1957, the company changed its corporate name to Chicago Dynamic Industries, retaining Chicago Coin as a label of the company. Genco would remain a competitor with Chicago Coin until the companies merged in 1959.

Though never a technologically-driven or innovative company, Chicago Coin was highly successful in the years preceding and immediately succeeding World War II. Their pinball table Beam-Lite (1935), which featured a lighted playfield, sold 5,703 units and their flipperless game Kilroy (1947) sold 8,800 units which was the highest selling pinball table up until the 1970s. The company also diversified in later years, creating sports tables and shuffle alleys.

=== 1960s ===
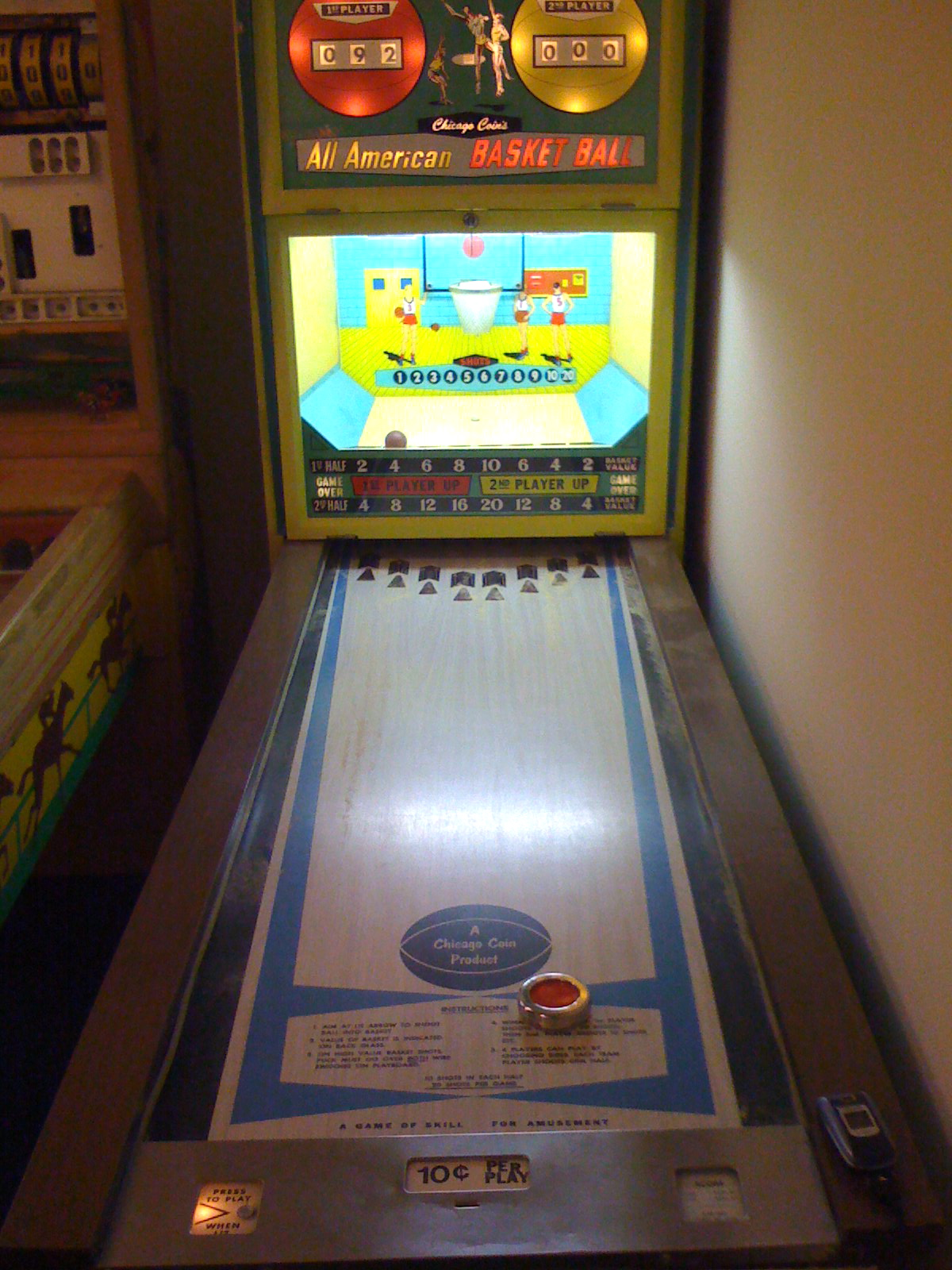
All American Basket Ball (1969), an arcade electro-mechanical game (EM game) produced by Chicago Coin

They later manufactured various other electro-mechanical games (EM games) for amusement arcades. In 1969, they manufactured Speedway, a licensed North American version of racing game Indy 500 (1968) from Japanese company Kasco. It resembled a prototypical arcade racing video game, with an upright cabinet, yellow marquee, three-digit scoring, coin box, steering wheel, accelerator pedal, and pseudo-3D first-person perspective.

While Kasco's original Indy 500 had sold over 2,000 arcade cabinets in Japan, Speedway went on to sell over 10,000 cabinets in North America, making it the biggest hit arcade game in years, and setting an arcade sales record that was not surpassed until the arrival of arcade video games in the 1970s. Like Sega's Periscope (1966), Speedway also charged a higher US quarter price point per play, further cementing quarter-play as the standard for North American arcade games for over two decades. Chicago Coin also adapted Speedway into a motorcycle racing game, Motorcycle, in 1970.

Speedway had an influence on Nolan Bushnell, who as a college student worked at an arcade where he became familiar with EM games such as Speedway, watching customers play and helping to maintain the machinery, while learning how it worked and developing his understanding of how the game business operates. When he founded Atari, Bushnell had originally planned to develop a driving video game, influenced by Speedway which at the time was the biggest-selling game at his arcade, but ended up developing Pong (1972) instead; Atari eventually developed a driving video game later on, Gran Trak 10 (1974).

=== 1970s ===
In 1973, Chicago Coin was one of the many companies who created Pong (1972) clones with TV Ping Pong (1973). In subsequent years, the company took to licensing games from other manufacturers including TV Goalee (1974) from Australian Leisure & Allied Industries, Super Flipper (1975) (originally UFO) from Model Racing of Italy, and Destruction Derby (1975) from Exidy of California. As a result of entering the video game market, in 1974 Chicago Dynamic Industries was one of the many companies sued by Magnavox regarding patents related to the Magnavox Odyssey (1972).

Chicago Coin's TV Pingame (1973) was a digital video game adaptation of pinball that had a vertical playfield with a paddle at the bottom, controlled by a dial, with the screen filled with simple squares to represent obstacles, bumpers and pockets. This inspired a number of clones, including TV Flipper (1973) by Midway Manufacturing, Exidy's TV Pinball (1974), and Pin Pong (1974) by Atari, Inc. The latter replaced the dial controls with button controls.

Following subsequent financial trouble, Chicago Dynamic Industries sold the assets of Chicago Coin which were incorporated into the new company Stern Electronics, Inc.

== Notable pinballs ==
Chicago Coin tables are often lesser known than those made by Gottlieb, Williams, and Bally. Nonetheless, there were several Chicago Coin tables which stood out amongst the larger market.

- Sun Valley (1962)
- Bronco (1963)
- Stage Coach (1968)
- Casino (1972)
- Hee Haw (1973)
- Riviera (1973)
- Hi Flyer (1974)
- Gold Record (1975)
- Red Baron (1975)
- Hollywood (1976)
- Sound Stage (1976)
