= Destruction Derby (1975 video game) =

- Developer: Exidy
- Publishers: Exidy; Chicago Coin
- Platform: Arcade
- Release: NA: December 1975
- Genre: Racing
- Mode: 2 player simultaneous

Destruction Derby is an arcade video game released by Exidy in 1975 as the company's first driving game. Exidy licensed it to Chicago Coin, who sold the game as Demolition Derby (not to be confused with Demolition Derby, a 1984 game by Bally Midway). Exidy stopped producing Destruction Derby to avoid competing with the licensed version, and instead developed a game with similar mechanics: the controversial Death Race.

== Game play ==
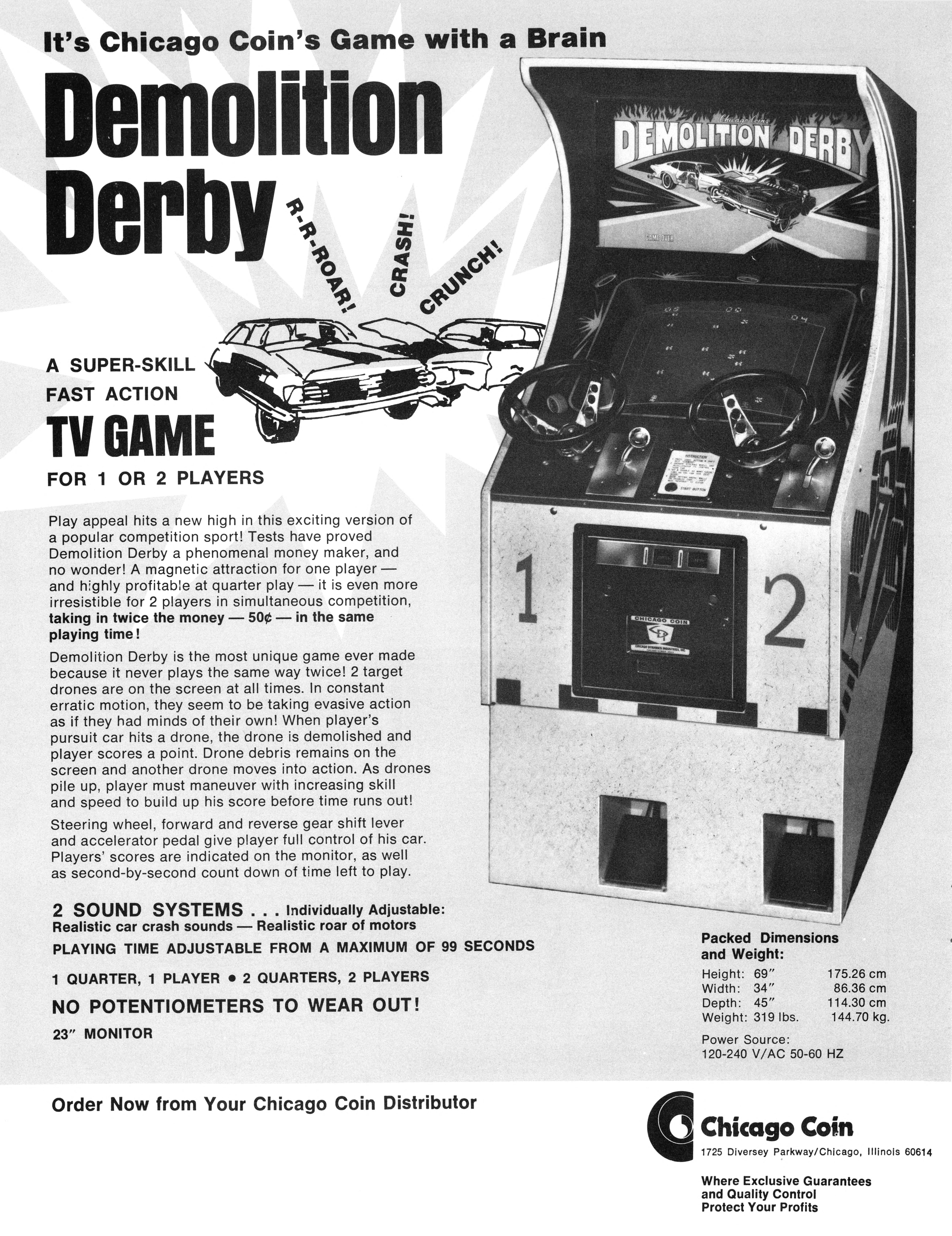
Printed advert for Demolition Derby

The object of the game was scoring by making a collision with other cars(which the promotioner flyer calls "drones") as much as possible. The game had a time limit.

== Reception ==
In March 1976, the first annual RePlay arcade chart listed Demolition Derby as the ninth-highest-earning arcade video game of the previous year in the United States.
