= Calorie Kun vs. Moguranian =

1986 video game

Calorie Kun Vs. Moguranian
- Developer(s): Vic Tokai
- Publisher(s): Sega
- Platform(s): Arcade
- Release: 1986
- Genre(s): Platform
- Mode(s): Single-player, multiplayer

Calorie Kun vs Moguranian is a platform game developed by Vic Tokai and published by Sega as an arcade video game in 1986.

== Gameplay ==
The player controls "Calorie-Kun" an abstract, mole-like creature that must make its way around a number of tunnels with ladders, avoiding enemies and collecting the items placed around the screen; before quickly making its way to the exit. The player is armed with a limited number of bombs that can be used to destroy or disable enemies.

Calorie-kun faces a timer in the form of a calorie counter which is slowly counting down and may be replenished by fruit and other food items scattered throughout the level. If allowed to drop too low, Calorie-kun will grow anemic and slow down considerably. If raised too high too quickly, Calorie-kun instead becomes too fat to move around in most tunnels until the counter drops again, or may even explode if the counter reaches an extreme.

== Reception ==
In Japan, Game Machine listed Calorie Kun vs. Moguranian on their October 1, 1986 issue as being the tenth most-successful table arcade unit of the month.
