= Circus (video game) =

1977 video game

- Arcade flyer
- Developer: Exidy
- Publishers: NA/EU: Exidy; JP: Taito
- Designers: Edward Valeau; Howell Ivy
- Platform: Arcade
- Release: WW: December 1977
- Genre: Block breaker
- Modes: Single-player, multiplayer

Circus is a block breaker arcade video game released by Exidy in 1977, and distributed by Taito in Japan. The game is a re-themed variant of Atari's Breakout, where the player controls a seesaw and clown in order to pop all the balloons in the level. The game has been copied and released under different names by numerous other companies in both the United States and Japan.

== Gameplay ==
Three rows of triangular balloons move along the top part of the screen, each overlaid with blue, green, and yellow (colors used in the original version), counting from the top row. A clown appears from the edge of the screen where there is a jumping board, and the player must move the springboard located at the bottom of the screen so that the clown can bounce back off the seesaw once he jumps off from his starting position. However, it is impossible to make contact with the clown with the seesaw in certain locations. The four jumping boards located on the sides of the screen serve to decrease the area where it is impossible to make contact.

If the player successfully gets the clown onto the seesaw, the clown on the other side shoots off into the air towards the three rows of balloons on the top of the screen. The clown may not have enough speed to reach the balloons if the first clown does not land squarely on the seesaw. Clowns bounce off of balloons, walls, and jumping boards, but will pass directly through multiple balloons if they are moving quickly enough. They will only bounce off the jumping boards when they are heading downwards and will pass straight through the boards while moving upwards.

Hitting any of the balloons with the clown causes them to burst, and the player receives 20 points for bursting the yellow balloon, 50 points for the green balloon, and 100 points for the blue balloon. Bursting the entire row of balloons causes a sound effect and awards the player 10 times the original points as a bonus (i.e. 200 points for the yellow balloon). A new row of balloons instantly replaces the old one when the entire row is destroyed.

Destroying all of the blue balloons causes another sound effect and allows the player to play one more time (one clown) after they have depleted their stock. The words "BONUS PLAY" appear to indicate this bonus, but destroying all of the blue balloons a second time will not allow the player to gain another clown (the bonus can be activated while the player is using the extra clown). This may differ in certain levels like 7 and 8, where all three rows of balloons must be destroyed in order to activate the bonus.

A clown will die if the player fails to receive them with the seesaw at the bottom of the screen, and two measures of the funeral march in Frédéric Chopin's Piano Sonata No. 2 are played as a sound effect. The player can continue if they still have stock remaining, or if they have been rewarded the bonus play. When the player has depleted all of their stock, the screen switches over to the demo screen, where the number of balloons is the same as that of the player's before they lost their final clown. If the player has reached over a certain number of points, they can play one more time like the balloon bonus (the availability of this bonus may differ, as indicated in the list of rules shown after the player enters the credits). The player cannot gain another clown in the same way during this play bonus.

== Development ==
The game was developed by Howell Ivy. He developed the idea for the game when working at the Ramtek Corporation when he was developing his first video game titled Clean Sweep which had a similar approach to Circus with eliminating objects on a screen. Wanting to make something different and appealing, he decided on making a game that was cute and had begun incorporating the tetter-totter and which led to eliminating balloons and then became the idea for Circus.

Circus was developed at Exidy. Exidy was founded in 1973 and first made video games that were variants on Pong and found success with their game Death Race (1976). Circus was the second game for Exidy to solely use a Microprocessor as games prior to this had been created in hardware using discrete integrated circuits. This change allowed for much more flexibility with Ivy stating he could add "more "intelligence": to the game. It was much simpler for you to make the game easier or harder for the player responding to his or her reactions."

Ivy coded Circus on a 6502 processor using a teletype machine. To add colour to the game, Ivy added cellophane to the screen to give the balloons their colors. He reflected on making the game recalling that on July 4, 1977, he was working into the night on it and hearing fireworks outside, saying he wandered outside noticing fireworks going off and thought to himself "'Why am I working on a holiday?' But I had to get the game done and shipped. That is what you have to do when you own a company."

== Release and reception ==
Circus was released to arcades in 1977. Reflecting on the release, Ivy reflected that the team at Exidy thought the game might appeal to a female audience which "was always the Holy Grail. It wasn't violent, it was cute. Even the sound was cute! The game had a warm and fluffy feel to it that we thought woman could relate to."

The game was successful at arcades. Ivy said that "of all the games we did, [Circus] was the one that made the most profit. It was the game that let Exidy grow into a mature company." The popularity of the game led Exidy to manufacture and supply printed circuit boards for several companies including Sega who renamed the game Seesaw Jump, Midway who released it as Clowns and Taito who released it as Acrobat. Midway's version added an "Oof" and "Pow" when one of the characters faceplanted into the ground.

The arcade game was a commercial success for Taito in Japan, where Circus was the fourth highest-earning arcade game of 1977, below Taito's own Speed Race DX, Atari's Breakout (distributed by Namco) and Universal's Scratch.

Computer and Video Games magazine reviewed the Atari VCS version in 1989, giving it an 82% score.

== Reviews ==
- Games

== Legacy ==
=== Arcade clones ===
- Clowns (licensed release by Midway)
- Acrobat (licensed release by Taito). It was the seventh highest-earning arcade video game of 1978 in Japan.
- Circus Circus (Universal)
- Seesaw Jump (Sega)
- Devil Circus (Hoei)
- Pierrot (Uko)
- Piccolo (IPM)
- Fūsen-wari game (lit. "Balloon popping game" Data East)
- Bonpa (Nihon Bussan)
- Balloon Circus (Data East). The screen is changed to a vertical rectangle. A cabinet version titled Mini Balloon was also released by Data East.
- Nyankoro (IPM). The balloons are changed to kittens, and the mother cat appears to prevent the player from progressing after a certain amount of time passes.

=== Home clones ===
Circus Atari for the Atari VCS (1980)

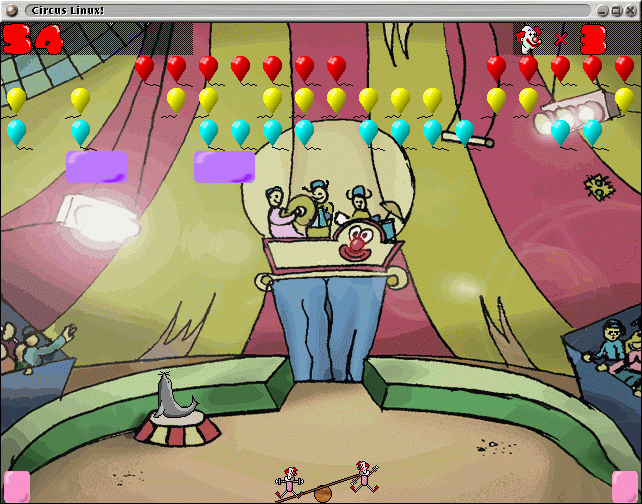
Circus Linux, a modern rendition of the game

- Atari released Circus Atari for the Atari VCS on January 10, 1980.
- Datasoft's 1982 Clowns and Balloons, for the Atari 8-bit computers and TRS-80 Color Computer, replaces the seesaw with a trampoline.
- P.T. Barnum's Acrobats! was published in 1982 by Philips for the Magnavox Odyssey 2.
- Seesaw Jump 2005 was released for the i-mode network by Sega.
- Circus Linux, an open source reimplementation developed by New Breed Software, available for various platforms

=== Similar games ===
- Trapeze (Exidy). The character gathers stars by swinging off the trapeze. The same game was also released by Taito with the title Trampoline.
- Gypsy Juggler (Meadows Games). This game uses otedama as a motif, and was also released by Taito.
- Rip Cord (Exidy). This game uses sky diving as a motif, and has sound effects for the start of the game and game over scene (The U.S. Air Force (song) for the opening and Ring a Ring o' Roses for game overs.) It was released in Japan by Data East as Nice On.
- Field Goal (Taito). This game uses American football as a motif. Though the game uses a normal paddle instead of a seesaw, the game is similar to Circus in that the objective is to eliminate 3 rows of football players wearing uniforms of different colors. Eliminated rows are refilled along with a similar sound effect to the original game.
- Plump Pop (Taito). This game was released as a remake of Circus in 1987. It was later ported to PlayStation 2. The seesaw was changed to a trampoline and features cuter characters, new items, levels, and bosses.

== See also ==
- List of Atari 2600 games
- Bloons
