= Exidy =

Developer and manufacturer of coin-operated amusements

Exidy, Inc.
- Type: Private
- Industry: Video games
- Founded: 1973
- Founders: H.R. Kauffman; Samuel Hawes
- Defunct: 1999
- Headquarters: Palo Alto, California, U.S.
- Products: Arcade games

Exidy, Inc. was an American developer and manufacturer of coin-operated electro-mechanical and video games which operated from 1973 to 1999. They manufactured many notable titles including Death Race (1976), Circus (1977), Star Fire (1978), Venture (1981), Mouse Trap (1981), Crossbow (1983), and Chiller (1986). They were also the creators of the Exidy Sorcerer (1978) home computer.

== History ==
Harold Ray “Pete” Kauffman had worked in the technological field at Data Disc Corporation with Charles McEwan and John Metzler. When the two broke off to form the graphics terminal company Ramtek Corporation in Sunnyvale, California, Kauffman joined them as a marketing executive. In late 1972, Kauffman was one of a handful of engineers sent to examine the prototype of Atari Inc’s Pong (1972) in the Andy Capp's Tavern in Sunnyvale. Kauffman recalled of the experience:

"I was really excited when I first saw the Pong game on test at a local pub. It was assembled in an old oak barrel ‘table model’ without a coin door. The quarters just dropped into the barrel...After playing the game, I tried to move it slightly. It wouldn't move. It must have been full of quarters. This could not have been a fad!"

Ramtek subsequently got into manufacturing coin-operated video games as a side business. Kauffman, however, believed that he could do more with a company dedicated to exploiting the new trend in electronic games. He and Ampex engineer Samuel Hawes formed a new company to enter the coin-op industry, Exidy, Inc on October 30, 1973. The name was a portmanteau of the phrase, “Excellence in Dynamics.”

Exidy's first products were in the ball-and-paddle genre, including a basic clone of Atari's Pong and TV Pinball (1974), which may have been modeled on an unreleased Ramtek game called Knockout. In 1975, Exidy began manufacturing electro-mechanical games with a game called Old Time Basketball (1975).

To help get their games a wider market, Exidy opened a licensing arrangement with the large amusement manufacturer Chicago Coin to license their video games. In 1975, John Metzler joined Exidy from Ramtek and produced a game called Destruction Derby (1975). Under the licensing arrangement, Chicago Coin produced a version called Demolition Derby (1975) which became a success, but they refused to pay their licensing fees to Exidy due to Chicago Coin's failing financial state. Needing to make a distinct game to compete with Demolition Derby, another engineer who had joined from Ramtek named Howell Ivy was assigned to create a quick turnaround. The resulting game, Death Race (1976), was a minor success before it attracted notice for its violent content. The resulting controversy gave Exidy a national profile with stories appearing on 60 Minutes and The New York Times as well as increased sales of the game. Several follow-up games from the company used the Death Race hardware, including Super Death Chase (1977) and Score (1977).

The salesman and spokesman for the company during the Death Race controversy, Paul Jacobs, served as the company's chief sales person from 1976 to 1978 and 1983-1984. Originally from Chicago Coin, Jacobs helped to build the company to become the third biggest manufacturer of arcade video games in 1977 and stabilized the company during a period of uncertainty after a downturn in video arcade games.

Howell Ivy began working with microprocessor technology after Death Race. He created the early color graphics game Car Polo (1977) and a game with a similar conceit to Breakout (1976) called Circus (1978). Circus inspired a number of clones in both Japan and North America, becoming Exidy's best-selling game at the time with 7,000 units sold.

Their exploration into microprocessors also led to the development of the Sorcerer personal computer. Partnering with early commercial computer retailer Paul Terrell, Exidy developed the hardware of a S-100 bus compatible system first sold in 1978. The hardware had no native graphics modes, though had a text mode with programmable characters. Exidy supported the system with documentation, tools, and a few in-house developed games, but the system did not have much of a following in North America. It later found support in Australia and Europe, particularly in the Netherlands where it was offered with a course on the educational channel TELEAC, in place of the Belgian DAI computer. They later sold their division to Biotech Capital Group in 1981. One independent Sorcerer game designer later brought in to create Exidy arcade games was Vic Tolomei.

Exidy released Star Fire (1978), the first arcade video game with a high score table, developed by independent company Techni-Cal. In November 1979, Exidy purchased the company Vectorbeam from Cinematronics. Renamed Exidy II (or Exidy 2), the company intended to continue running the Union City manufacturing plant to exploit the vector graphics technology under license from Cinematronics. The company released a version of Tailgunner (1979) under this arrangement called Tailgunner II, but did not release any other games using vector graphics technology at the time. They later created the vector game Vertigo (1985).

Several of Exidy's games found success putting twists on popular arcade concepts of the time. Their game Crash (1979) was similar to Sega's Head On (1979), which Sega subsequently threatened legal action over. They expanded on the gameplay with Targ (1980), creating a unique blend of maze and shooting elements. Their game Mouse Trap (1981) riffed on Pac-Man (1980) and was later ported to both the Atari VCS and Colecovision consoles by Coleco. Venture (1981) is an action-based take on dungeon crawling similar to Berzerk (1980).

When the coin-operated video game market started to suffer in mid-1982, Exidy diversified into different experiences. They returned to electro-mechanical games with Whirly Bucket (1983) and Tidal Wave (1983), both takes on skee ball. They created Fax (1983), a video quiz game aimed at the bar and tavern market.

In 1983, Exidy began creating light gun games, which had not been popular in the arcades since the heyday of electro-mechanical games. Crossbow (1983) was a success, establishing the Exidy 440 hardware system and prompting the release of more light gun games in the same style. The ‘c’ series consisted of Cheyenne, Combat, Crackshot, Clay Pigeon, and Chiller (1986). Chiller, like Death Race before it, attracted attention due to its violent and graphic content, including shooting body parts off of torture victims.

In 1984, Exidy invested in an interchangeable kit design called the Max-A-Flex based on the Atari 8-bit computers, specifically the 600XL. The system featured four titles licensed from First Star Software: Boulder Dash, Flip and Flop, Bristles, and Astro Chase. Max-A-Flex was abandoned after the release of these games.

Through its entire operation, Exidy remained privately owned and did not seek venture capital investment. This also led to a resistance to license product from other countries like Japan, relying mostly on in-house talent. (Note: Exidy did license some product early in its history, including Bandido from Nintendo.) In 1985, the company went into bankruptcy and former Atari coin-op head Gene Lipkin became president. A plan was hatched for Exidy to be bought by Sega, but this never materialized and Lipkin left to establish Sega Enterprises USA.

Exidy had a bonus program for engineers who created hit games, but did not start crediting its developers until fairly late in its history. In the company's later years, many of their game designers left to join other studios. Long term game designer Howell Ivy departed the company for Sega Enterprises USA to help start their product development apparatus. Ken Nicholson who worked on the light gun series as well as Top Secret (1986) left to join Epyx. Designer Vic Tolomei left in 1987.

The company's last traditional video game was Who Dunit (1988). Afterwards, they moved into video poker machines and eventually into electro-mechanical redemption games. Kauffman eventually brought in his daughter Victoria and maintained control of the company until it was voluntarily dissolved in 1999.

In 2006, Mean Hamster Software acquired the license to develop new versions of Exidy's arcade catalog. They eventually released Crossbow for IPhone in 2010. In 2015, Collectorvision Games registered the abandoned trademark for Exidy along with its logo.

In 2007, Pete Kauffman worked with the developers of the MAME arcade emulator to release a number of Exidy arcade properties for non-commercial use by community members. Over time, these games included Circus, Robot Bowl, Car Polo, Side Trak, Ripcord, Fire One, Crash, Star Fire, Star Fire II, Targ, Spectar, Hard Hat, Victory, Teeter Torture, Fax, and Top Gunner. The ROM images of these games are available to download from the MAME website after acknowledging their terms of use.

Pete Kauffman died on July 3, 2015.

== Arcade titles ==
Title	Release date	Notes
TV Pinball	1975	License of Ramtek's Knockout. The cocktail version is called Table Pinball.
Table Foosballer	1975	Licensed from Ramtek.
Alley Rally	1975	
Destruction Derby	1975	
Old Time Basketball	1975	Mechanical basketball game.
Death Race	April 1, 1976	During development, this game was known as Death Race 98.
Robot Bowl	1977	
Score	1977	
Super Death Chase	1977	
Circus	1977	
Car Polo	1977	
Attack	1977	
Football	1978	
Rip Cord	1979	
Side Trak	1979	
Crash	1979	
Fire One!	1979	
Star Fire	1979	
Bandido	January 1980	Originally developed and released by Nintendo in 1979 as Sheriff
Tail Gunner 2	1980	Purchased from Cinematronics
Spectar	1980	
Targ	1980	
Mouse Trap	1981	
Venture	1981	
Pepper II	1982	
Victory	1982	Exidy also produced upgrade-kit of this game called Victor Banana.
Hard Hat	1982	Limited release
Fax	1983	
Whirly Bucket	1983	A twist on the Skee-Ball concept. Unlike that game, the balls curve around a loop, hopefully falling into a hole. Just under the holes, there is a moving puppet, which can be struck with the ball for double points.
Tidal Wave	1983	A twist on the Skee-Ball concept. Unlike that game, the balls curve around a loop, hopefully falling into a hole.
Crossbow	1983	
Cheyenne	1984	
Catch-22	1985	
Combat	1985	
Crackshot	1985	
Vertigo	1985	Limited release
Top Gunner	1986	
Top Secret	1986	During development, this game was called 0077. The title was changed to Top Secret possibly due to copyright issues, since the title is similar to the movie series 007. When the game was changed to Top Secret, 50 levels were added and the controls were changed to a steering wheel.
Clay Pigeon	1986	
Chiller	1986	
Hit 'n Miss	1987	
Who Dunit	1988	
Showdown	1988	Poker game
Yukon	1989	Poker game (gambling version)
Twister	1989	A take on the Skee-Ball concept.
Turbo Ticket	1996	A take on the ticket grabber concept.

=== First Star Software games ===
These were licensed from First Star Software in 1984 for use with the Max-A-Flex arcade system.

- Astro Chase
- Flip and Flop
- Bristles
- Boulder Dash

=== Unreleased prototypes ===
- Kreepy Krawlers (1979)
- UFO's (1980)
- Teeter Torture (1982)
- Snapper (1982)
- Critter (1995, mechanical gun game)
- Hot Shot (1995, mechanical gun game)
- Troll (1995, mechanical gun game)
