= Death Race (1976 video game) =

1976 video game

- Arcade flyer
- Developer: Exidy
- Publisher: Exidy
- Platform: Arcade
- Release: NA: April 1976; JP: September 1977
- Genres: Arcade, racing
- Modes: Single-player, 2 players (simultaneous)

Death Race is an arcade driving video game developed and released by Exidy in the United States, first shipping to arcade distributors in April 1976. The game was a modification of Exidy's 1975 game Destruction Derby in which players crashed into cars to accrue points. In Death Race, the objective became to run into "gremlins" to gain score. The game could be played with one or two players controlling different cars. The original working title for the game which appeared on some early advertisements was Death Race 98.

The game attracted a great deal of controversy over the content of the game which was centered around killing humanoid figures. In July 1976, newspapers and civic organizations began to attack the game for facilitating violence in virtual form.

== Gameplay ==
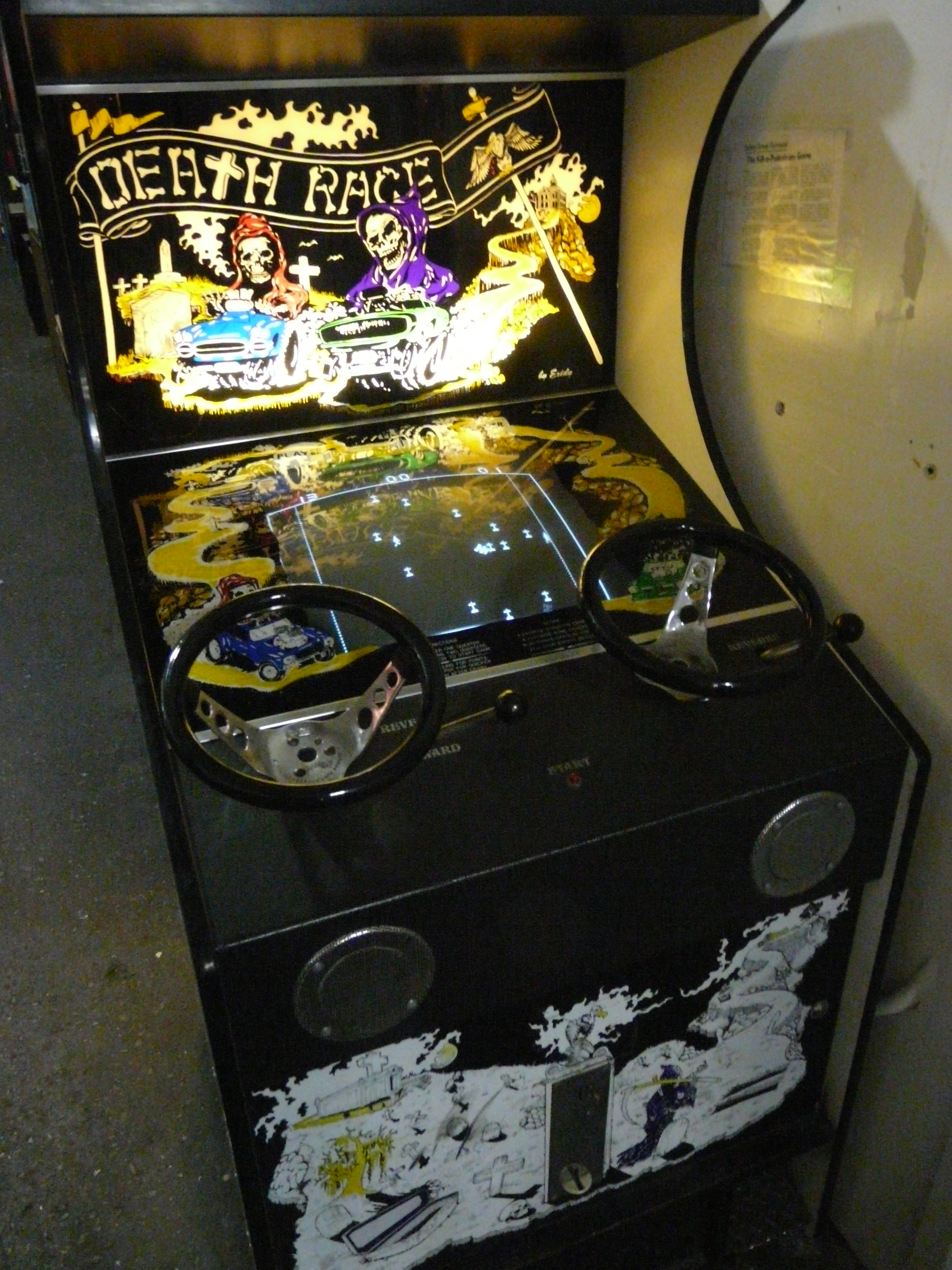
An upright cabinet

In the game, one or two players control an on-screen car with a steering wheel and an acceleration pedal. The object is to run down "gremlins" who are fleeing the vehicle. As the player hits them, they scream or squeal and are replaced on-screen by tombstones. This increases the challenge of the game as the screen clutters up and the player has to avoid the tombstones.

The cabinet is black, with white graphics of a muscle car racing through a cemetery with a vulture in a tree looking on. The marquee and monitor bezel are colored. A limited number had white sides with the artwork in black, instead of the reverse. It was in an upright standard racing-style cabinet.

== History ==
In 1975, Exidy licensed its game Destruction Derby to arcade game company Chicago Coin to manufacture. However, the following year Chicago Coin entered financial difficulties which would eventually lead to the dissolution of the company, and as Exidy had sold exclusive manufacturing rights they could no longer profit from Destruction Derby.

Needing an interim product to introduce to distributors, they decided to modify the Destruction Derby game so that it would be saleable by their organization. Newly-arrived engineer Howell Ivy from Ramtek made several modifications to Destruction Derby in order to create this new product. He added curbs to the left and right of the screen that the enemies could hide behind, but players would be stalled if they attempted to cross over. On the top and bottom of the screen, players could wrap around to the opposite side in a manner similar to Atari's Space Race (1973).

The enemy opponents were changed to animated figures which walked around the screen instead of vehicles. These 'gremlins' would wander the playspace until one of the players collided with them, at which point they would let out a 'screech' and leave behind a cross representing a tombstone. Though a number of sources have reported that the game was a licensed adaptation of the 1975 film Death Race 2000, Exidy has denied that this was the case. The name "Death Race" was chosen as a reflection of the undead monsters depicted in the cabinet art and marketing, both devised by artist Michael Cooper-Hart.

Exidy only intended Death Race as an interim product until their subsequent game Car Polo (1977) was completed. Viewed from an aerial perspective, the gremlins look very similar to humans and this got the attention of national news programs such as 60 Minutes. In July 1976, Associated Press reporter Wendy Walker reached out to Exidy based on her viewing of the game at a Seattle arcade. Concerned about the game's violent content and its potential effect on those playing it, she wrote a widely disseminated article which pointed out the game's content unfavorably.

Following this article, many news organizations through 1976 and 1977 reported on Death Race, including national newspapers like The New York Times. Many at Exidy attribute a large jump in sales for the company to this increase in national profile for Death Race, even though most of the coverage was negative. By the end of 1977 the game no longer graced headlines.

== Reception ==
In the United States, it was the eighth highest-grossing arcade game of 1976 according to RePlay magazine. It was later the seventh highest-grossing arcade game of 1977, according to Play Meter magazine.

== Legacy ==
Funspot has a working arcade machine in an all-yellow cabinet. An original arcade version of Death Race is present in the Musée Mécanique in San Francisco. The Galloping Ghost Arcade in Brookfield, Illinois, received an original black cabinet as a donation.

In 2016 Binary Star Software released a dual title cartridge called "Nox / Death Chase". The release of "Death Chase" recreates the look, feel, and play of the 1970s Death Race on the 1980s Vectrex vector graphics home video game system.
