= Crash 'N Score =

1975 video game

- Arcade flyer
- Developer(s): Atari, Inc.
- Publisher(s): Atari, Inc.
- Platform(s): Arcade
- Release: NA: October 1975
- Genre(s): Action
- Mode(s): Multiplayer

Crash 'N Score is a two-player arcade video game released by Atari, Inc. in 1975. A modified version of the game was released in Europe under the name Stock Car.

== Gameplay ==
Gameplay is a simulation of a demolition derby, in which players compete by smashing each other and running over randomly appearing numbered flags within an allotted time. Players can choose to play with or without barriers.
