= 1972 in video games =

1972 marked an important landmark in the history of the video game industry with the releases of Pong and the Odyssey home console. The profile of electronic games rose substantially as companies began exploring the creation and distribution of video games on a larger scale. Several important mainframe computer games were created in this period, some of which became the basis for early microcomputer games.

== Events ==
- May 3 – Magnavox initiates their Magnavox Profit Caravan series of traveling exhibits to demonstrate all of their 1972 product line to their dealers and the public, including the Odyssey. The first showing occurs in Phoenix, Arizona.
  - May 24 – At a showing in Burlingame, California, three representatives of Nutting Associates including Nolan Bushnell visit the showcase and play the Odyssey demonstration unit. Bushnell takes particular note of the Odyssey game Table Tennis.
- June 26 – Bally Manufacturing formalizes an agreement with Nolan Bushnell for the creation of one video game and one pinball table for Bally. In a subsequent letter, Bushnell describes the creation of a hockey-themed game. The term “video amusement game” is used by Bushnell – one of the earliest instances of the phrase “video game” in print.
- August or September – Atari Inc. tests a prototype of Pong at Andy Capp’s Tavern (later the Rooster T. Feathers Comedy Club) in Sunnyvale, California.
- August 13–15 – Chess 3.0 wins the U.S. American Computer Chess Championship in Boston, Massachusetts for the third consecutive year.
- September 14–16 – The Music Operators of America show is held in Chicago, Illinois. Nutting Associates displays Computer Space for the second year and For-Play Manufacturing showcases Star Trek as the only two video games on the show floor.
- September 22 – Felipe Mor Pérez, head of research and development of Inter Electrónica, registers the trademark "Odyssey" in Spain – describing it as an "electronic toy." This precipitated the development of the Overkal, a Spanish clone of the Odyssey home console.
- October 19 – The Intergalactic Spacewar Olympics competition is held at the Stanford Artificial Intelligence Project facilities at Stanford University. It is the first formal video game competition and is a central story of the article "Spacewar, Fanatic Life and Death Among Computer Bums" in the December 7, 1972 issue of Rolling Stone, written by Stewart Brand.
- November 24 – Nolan Bushnell files for US patent #3,793,483 relating to work developed for video game technology on Computer Space. The patent is issued in February 1974 and does not serve as an effective deterrent against video game copycats.

== Financial performance ==
=== United States ===
==== Arcade ====
Title	Arcade cabinet units (Lifetime)	Manufacturer	Developer	Genre
Pong	8,000< 8,000 (Note: Ralph Baer's numbers compiled in April 1976 are mostly estimates without direct access to sales figures.)	Atari Inc.	Atari Inc.	Sports

==== Home consoles ====
Title	Game console units (1972)	Manufacturer	Developer
Odyssey	69,000† 80,000 (Note: Ralph Baer's numbers for Odyssey units sold per year contradict those of official figures disclosed by Magnavox in 1974.)	Magnavox Co.	Sanders Associates/Magnavox

^{†} Indicates a sales number given by official company sources.

== Notable releases ==
=== Publications ===
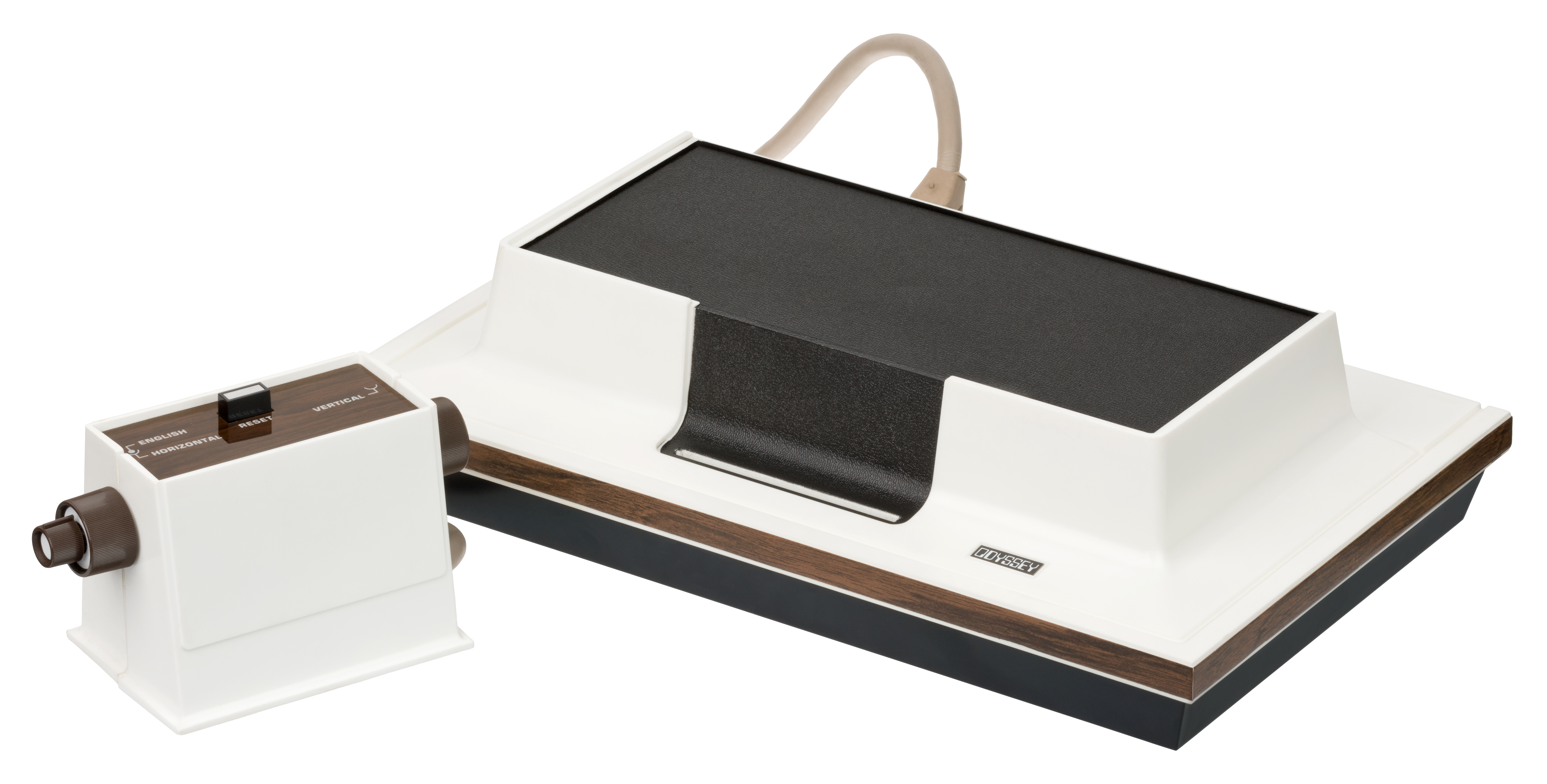
Magnavox Odyssey

- October – The date of the first issue of the People’s Computer Company newsletter published by Dymax Inc. The magazine prints type-in listings of games and other demonstrations in the BASIC programming language, helping spread games originally created on time-sharing computer networks.

=== Games ===
==== Arcade ====
- March – A second unit of Galaxy Game is placed at the Tresidder Student Union at Stanford University. This version features two fiberglass cabinets with two players each, which can be linked to create a four-player game.
- October – Coin-operated games company For-Play Manufacturing of California releases Star Trek (1972) – a presumed clone of Nutting Associates’ Computer Space.
- November – Atari Inc. releases their game Pong, selling it to coin-op distributors in the northern California region. The game becomes a hit in the local area and launches Atari’s business.

==== Computer ====
- Empire by Reed College student Peter Langston is created for the HP2000 minicomputer.
- Louis Bloomfield of University of Illinois Champaign-Urbana creates the game Moonwar for the PLATO IV mainframe system. It becomes the most popular “big board” game on the network.

=== Hardware ===
==== Consoles ====
- September – Magnavox releases their Odyssey console in twenty-five major U.S. markets. It includes twelve games packed in with the console. A light gun addon with additional games is sold separately. They manufacture 140,000 consoles in their first year on the market.

== Business ==
- June 27 – Atari Inc. is founded by Nolan Bushnell and Ted Dabney in Sunnyvale, California. They absorb the assets of their prior partnership, Syzygy, though continue using the name Syzygy under a doing business as association.
- Dymax Inc. establishes a location in Menlo Park, California. They invite interested individuals to visit the location to access time-sharing terminals at the location to create and use programs – many of which are published in the People's Computer Company newsletter.

== See also ==
- 1972 in games
