= 1971 in video games =

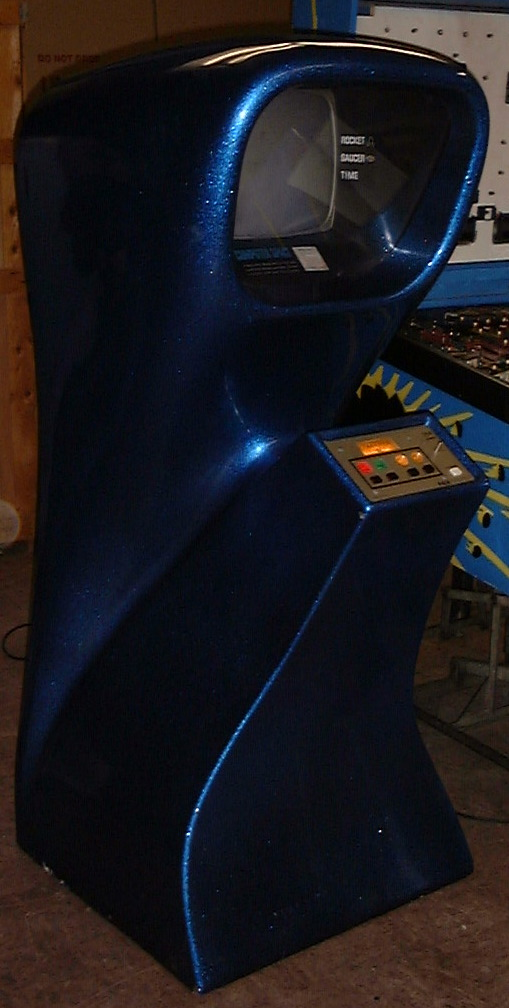
Computer Space was released in 1971.

1971 is the first year of the commercial video game industry with the release of Computer Space by Nutting Associates and Galaxy Game by Mini-Computer Applications. The majority of digital games remained exclusive mainframe computers and time-sharing networks, while an increasing number of them were demonstrated outside of traditional computing audiences. Several developments of games later commercialized – including Oregon Trail and the Magnavox Odyssey console – are first publicly tested in this period.

== Events ==
- March 11 – A preliminary agreement is signed between Magnavox and Sanders Associates to license the patents by Ralph Baer and William Rusch for the technology of the Brown Box home video game prototype. Magnavox begins development on a product based on this technology, initially dubbed Skill-O-Vision.
- Spring – Nolan Bushnell establishes contact with coin-op game manufacturer Nutting Associates. He joins the company as chief engineer, with an agreement to separately license the in-progress game as well as the technology developed by himself and Ted Dabney.
- July 26–30 – Magnavox initiates the first test market of its home video game system in Grand Rapids, Michigan at their authorized dealer Williams Magnavox Home Entertainment Center at the Eastbrook Mall.
- August – A prototype of Computer Space is tested at a bar called the Dutch Goose in Menlo Park, California.
- August 2–4 – The second U.S. Computer Chess Championship is held in Chicago, Illinois. The winner of the previous competition, Chess 3.0, wins for a second year.
- October – A second test market of the Magnavox home video game is held in Los Angeles, California at three stores, under new product manager Robert Fritsche.
- October 15–17 – Computer Space is shown at the Music Operators of America show in Chicago by Nutting Associates. Though the game attracts some notice, coin-operated game distributors do not place any orders for the game.

== Financial performance ==
=== United States ===
==== Arcade ====
Title	Arcade cabinet units (Lifetime)	Manufacturer	Developer	Genre
Computer Space	1,300-1,500 200 (Note: Ralph Baer's numbers compiled in April 1976 are mostly estimates without direct access to sales figures.)	Nutting Associates	Syzygy Engineering	Multidirectional shooter
Galaxy Game	2	Mini-Computer Applications	Mini-Computer Applications	Multidirectional shooter

== Notable releases ==
=== Games ===
==== Arcade ====
- Late November – The first prototype of Galaxy Game is placed on location at the Stanford University Tressider Union by Bill Pitts and Hugh Tuck, operating under the name Minicomputer Applications. The initial version enables one on one player competition at one dime per play or three players for a quarter.
- November or December – Computer Space by Nutting Associates ships to distributors, the first commercially available coin-operated video game.

==== Computer ====
- Summer – High school student Mike Mayfield develops the game Star Trek in BASIC on an SDS Sigma 7 at University of California at Berkeley. The following year it is added to Hewlett-Packard’s contributed programming library and becomes a staple of timeshared computer networks.
- December 3 – The program OREGON is showcased to students at Jordan Junior High in Minneapolis, Minnesota taught by student teacher Don Rawitsch. It had been earlier tested by the students of Paul Dillenberger and Bill Heinemann at Bryant Junior High.
- University of California Pomona student Don Daglow writes two games for the PDP-10 computer: one called Baseball and another called Star Trek. He would later become a prominent game designer and producer.
- At Carleton College, students create several computer games for graphical terminals, including one replicating pinball.

== Business ==
- January – The legal partnership between Nolan Bushnell and Ted Dabney is formalized as the Syzygy Company. Their name on the cabinet of Computer Space is rendered as “Syzygy Engineering.”
- September 4 – Ramtek Corporation, one of the first companies involved with coin-operated video games, is founded to produce graphical terminals.

== See also ==
- Early history of video games
- 1971 in games
