= Arcade video game =

Coin-operated entertainment machine genre

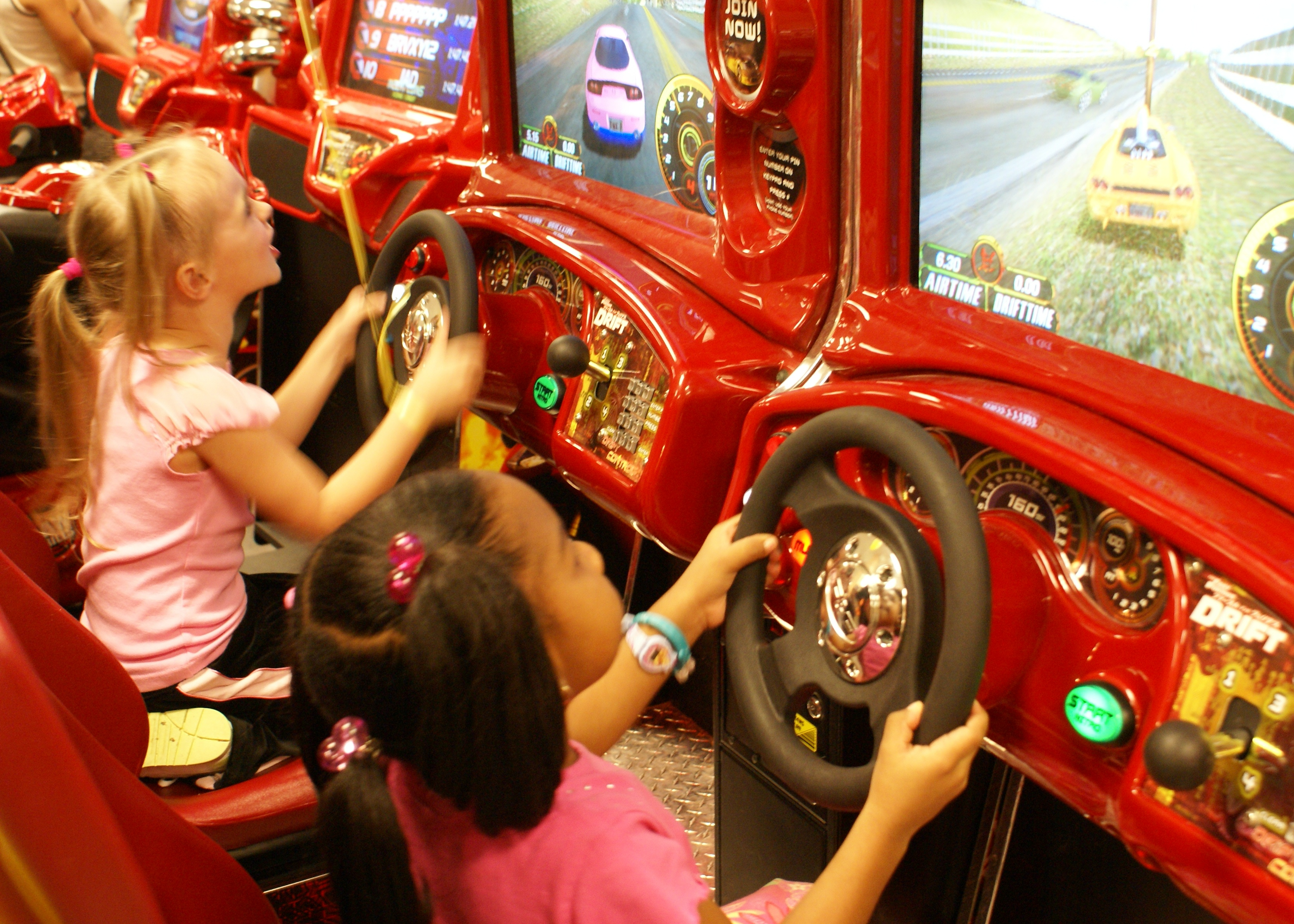
Two children playing the arcade racing game The Fast and the Furious: Drift in 2007

An arcade video game is an arcade game that takes player input from its controls, processes it through electrical or computerized components, and displays output to an electronic monitor or similar display. All arcade video games are coin-operated or accept other means of payment, housed in an arcade cabinet, and located in amusement arcades alongside other kinds of arcade games. Until the early 2000s, arcade video games were the largest and most technologically advanced segment of the video game industry.

Early prototypical entries Galaxy Game and Computer Space in 1971 established the principle operations for arcade games, and Atari's Pong in 1972 is recognized as the first successful commercial arcade video game. Improvements in computer technology and gameplay design led to a golden age of arcade video games, the exact dates of which are debated but range from the late 1970s to the early 1980s. This golden age includes Space Invaders, Pac-Man, and Donkey Kong. The arcade industry had a resurgence from the early 1990s to mid-2000s, including Street Fighter II, Mortal Kombat, and Dance Dance Revolution, but ultimately declined in the Western world as competing home video game consoles such as the Sony PlayStation and Microsoft Xbox increased in their graphics and gameplay capability and decreased in cost. Nevertheless, Japan, China, and South Korea continue to maintain a robust arcade industry in contemporary times.

== History ==
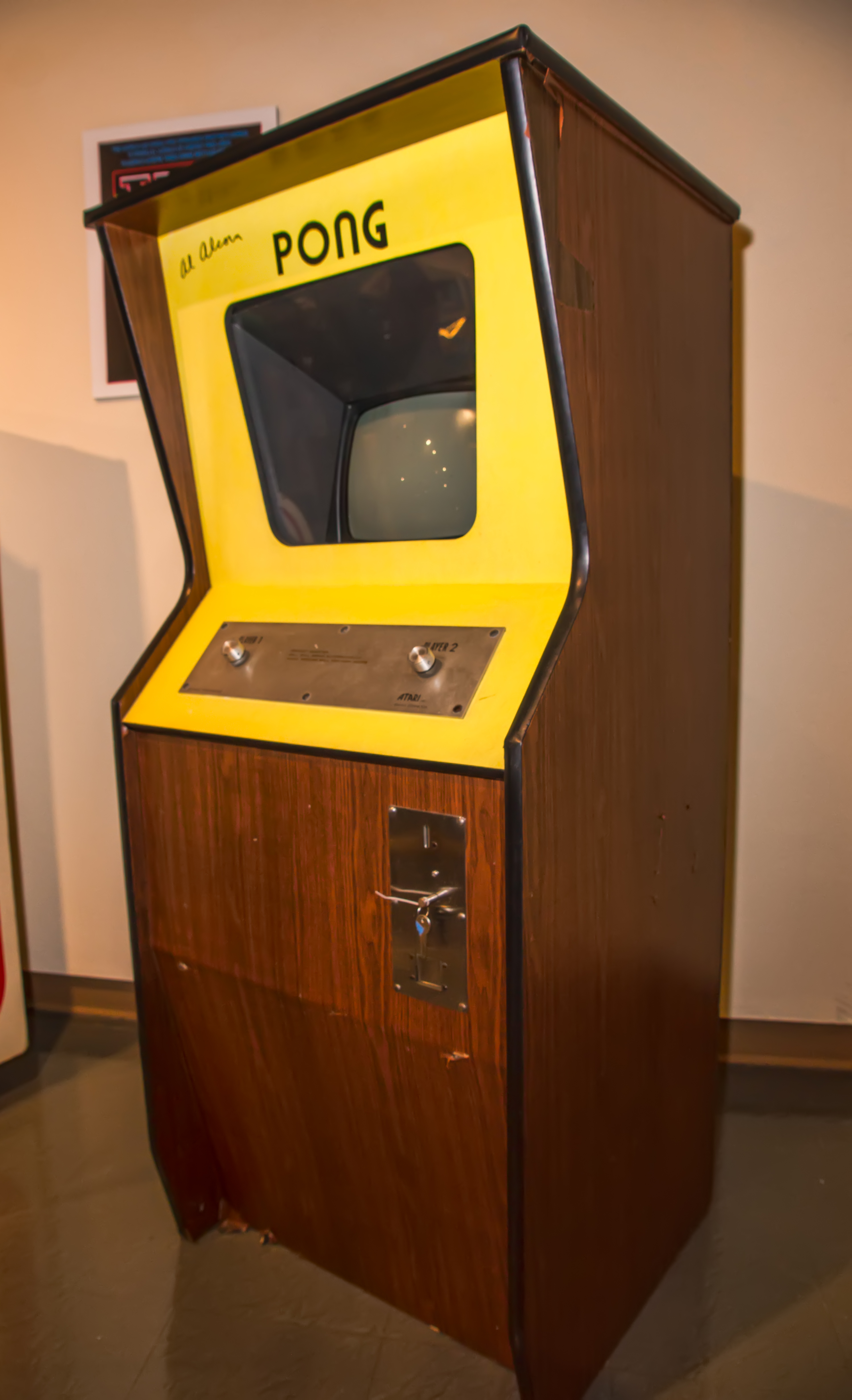
Pong is the first commercially successful arcade video game.

Games of skill were popular amusement-park midway attractions from the 19th century on. With the introduction of electricity and coin-operated machines, they facilitated a viable business. When pinball machines with electric lights and displays were introduced in 1933 (but without the user-controller flippers which would not be invented until 1947) these machines were seen as games of luck. Numerous states and cities treated them as amoral playthings for rebellious young people, and banned them into the 1960s and 1970s.

Electro-mechanical games (EM games) appeared in arcades in the mid-20th century. Following Sega's EM game Periscope (1966), the arcade industry experienced a "technological renaissance" driven by "audio-visual" EM novelty games, establishing the arcades as a suitable environment for the introduction of commercial video games in the early 1970s. In the late 1960s, college student Nolan Bushnell had a part-time job at an arcade where he became familiar with EM games watching customers play and helping to maintain the machinery, while learning the game business.

The early mainframe game Spacewar! (1962) inspired the first commercial arcade video game, Computer Space (1971), created by Nolan Bushnell and Ted Dabney and released by Nutting Associates. It was demonstrated at the Amusement & Music Operators Association (AMOA) show in October 1971. Another Spacewar-inspired coin-operated video game, Galaxy Game, was demonstrated at Stanford University in November 1971. Bushnell and Dabney followed their Computer Space success to create - with the help of Allan Alcorn - a table-tennis game, Pong, released in 1972. Pong became a commercial success, leading numerous other coin-op manufacturers to enter the market.

The video game industry transitioned from discrete integrated circuitry to programmable microprocessors in the mid-1970s, starting with Gun Fight in 1975. The arcade industry entered a "Golden Age" in 1978 with the release of Taito's Space Invaders, which introduced many novel gameplay features. From 1978 to 1982, several other major arcade-games from Namco, Atari, Williams Electronics, Stern Electronics, and Nintendo were all considered blockbusters, particularly Namco's Pac-Man (1980), which became a fixture in popular culture. Across North America and Japan, dedicated video-game arcades appeared and arcade-game cabinets appeared in many smaller storefronts. By 1981, the arcade video-game industry was worth US$8 billion in the US.

The novelty of arcade games waned sharply after 1982 due to several factors, including market saturation of arcades and arcade games and a moral panic over video games (similar to fears raised over pinball machines in the decades prior). The arcade market had recovered by 1986, with the help of software-conversion kits, the arrival of popular beat 'em up games (such as Kung-Fu Master (1984) and Renegade (1986–1987)), and advanced motion simulator games (such as Sega's "taikan" games including Hang-On (1985), Space Harrier (1985), and Out Run (1986)). However, the growth of home video-game systems such as the Nintendo Entertainment System led to another brief arcade decline toward the end of the 1980s.

Arcade games continued to improve with the development of technology and of gameplay. In the early 1990s, the release of Capcom's Street Fighter II established the modern style of fighting games and led to a number of similar games such as Mortal Kombat, Fatal Fury, Killer Instinct, Virtua Fighter, and Tekken, creating a new renaissance in the arcades. Another factor was realism, including the "3D Revolution" from 2D and pseudo-3D graphics to "true" real-time 3D polygon graphics. This was largely driven by a technological arms-race between Sega and Namco. During the early 1990s games such as Sega's Virtua Racing and Virtua Fighter popularized 3D-polygon technology in arcades. 3D graphics later became popular in console and computer games by the mid-1990s, though arcade systems such as the Sega Model 3 remained considerably more advanced than home systems in the late 1990s. Until about 1996, arcade video-games had remained the largest segment of the global video-game industry. Arcades declined in the late 1990s, surpassed by the console market for the first time around 1997–1998.

Since the 2000s, arcade games have taken different routes globally. In the United States, arcades have become niche markets as they compete with the home-console market, and they have adapted other business models, such as providing other entertainment options or adding prize redemptions. In Japan, where arcades continue to flourish, games like Dance Dance Revolution and The House of the Dead aim to deliver tailored experiences that players cannot easily have at home.

== Technology ==
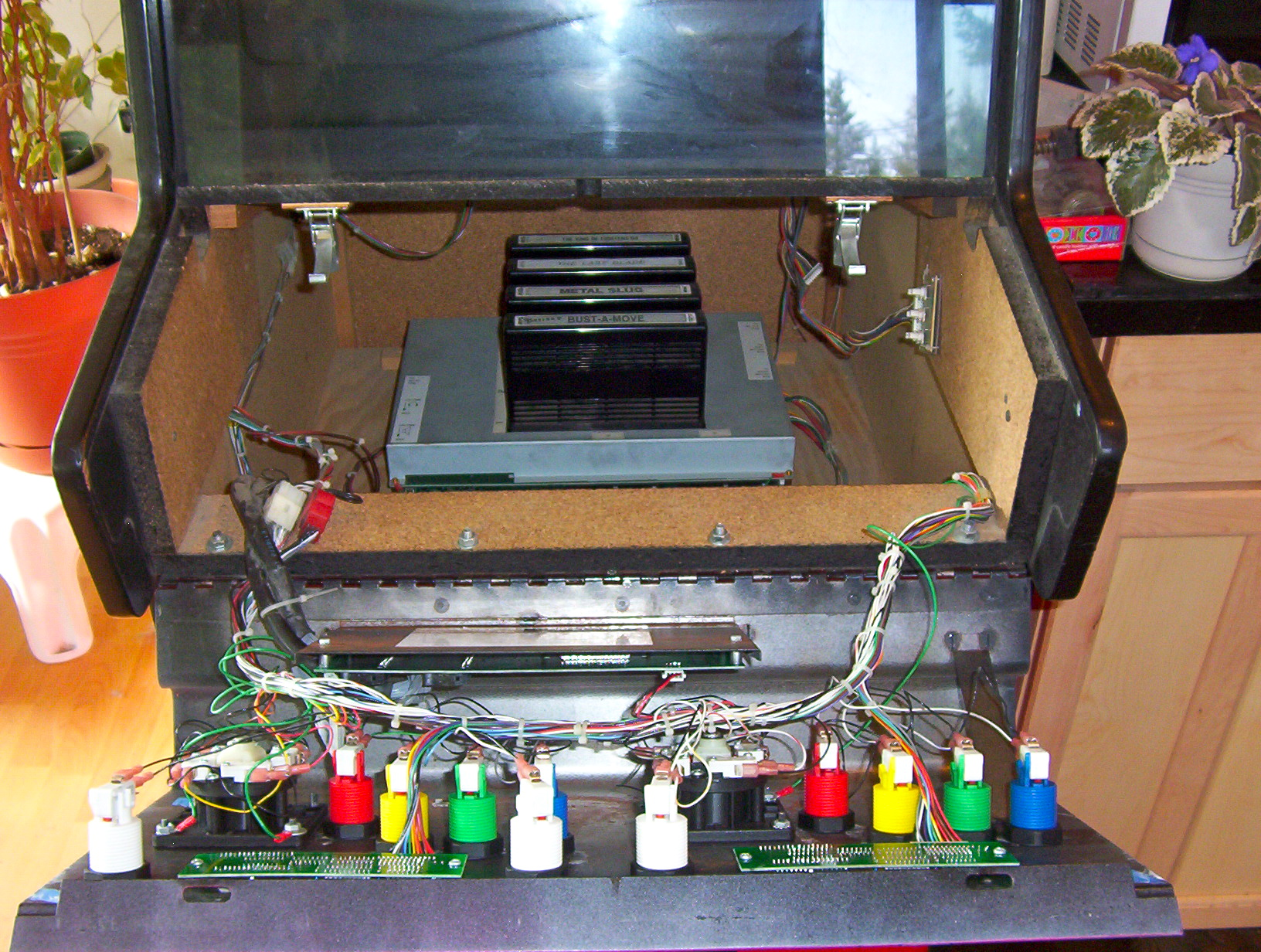
The inside of a Neo Geo MVS arcade cabinet

Virtually all modern arcade games (other than the very traditional fair midway) make extensive use of solid state electronics, integrated circuits, and monitor screens, all installed inside an arcade cabinet.

With the exception of Galaxy Game and Computer Space, which were built around small form-factor mainframe computers, the first arcade games are based on combinations of multiple discrete logic chips, such as transistor–transistor logic (TTL) chips. Designing an arcade game was more about the combination of these TTL chips and other electronic components to achieve the desired effect on screen. More complex gameplay required significantly more TTL components to achieve this result. By the mid-1970s, the first inexpensive programmable microprocessors had arrived on the market. The first microprocessor-based video game is Midway's Gun Fight in 1975 (a conversion of Taito's Western Gun), and with the advent of Space Invaders and the golden era, microprocessor-based games became typical. Early arcade games were also designed around raster graphics displayed on a cathode-ray tube (CRT) display. Many games of the late 1970s and early 1980s use special displays that rendered vector graphics, though these waned by the mid-1980s as display technology on CRTs improved. Prior to the availability of color CRT or vector displays, some arcade cabinets have a combination of angled monitor positioning, one-way mirrors, and clear overlays to simulate colors and other graphics onto the gameplay field.

Coin-operated arcade video games from the 1990s to the 2000s generally use custom hardware often with multiple CPUs, highly specialized sound and graphics chips, and the latest in expensive computer graphics display technology. This allows more complex graphics and sound than contemporary video game consoles or personal computers. Many arcade games since the 2000s run on modified video game console hardware (such as the Sega NAOMI or Triforce) or gaming PC components (such as the Taito Type X). Many arcade games have more immersive and realistic game controls than PC or console games. This includes specialized ambiance or control accessories such as fully enclosed dynamic cabinets with force feedback controls, dedicated lightguns, rear-projection displays, reproductions of automobile or airplane cockpits, motorcycle or horse-shaped controllers, or highly dedicated controllers such as dancing mats and fishing rods. These accessories are usually too bulky, expensive, and specialized to be used with typical home PCs and consoles. Arcade makers experiment with virtual reality technology. Arcades have progressed from using coins as credits to smart cards that hold the virtual currency of credits.

Modern arcade cabinets use flat panel displays instead of cathode-ray tubes. Internet services such as ALL.Net, NESiCAxLive, e-Amusement and NESYS, allow the cabinets to download updates or new games, do online multiplayer gameplay, save progress, unlock content, or earn credits.

== Genres ==
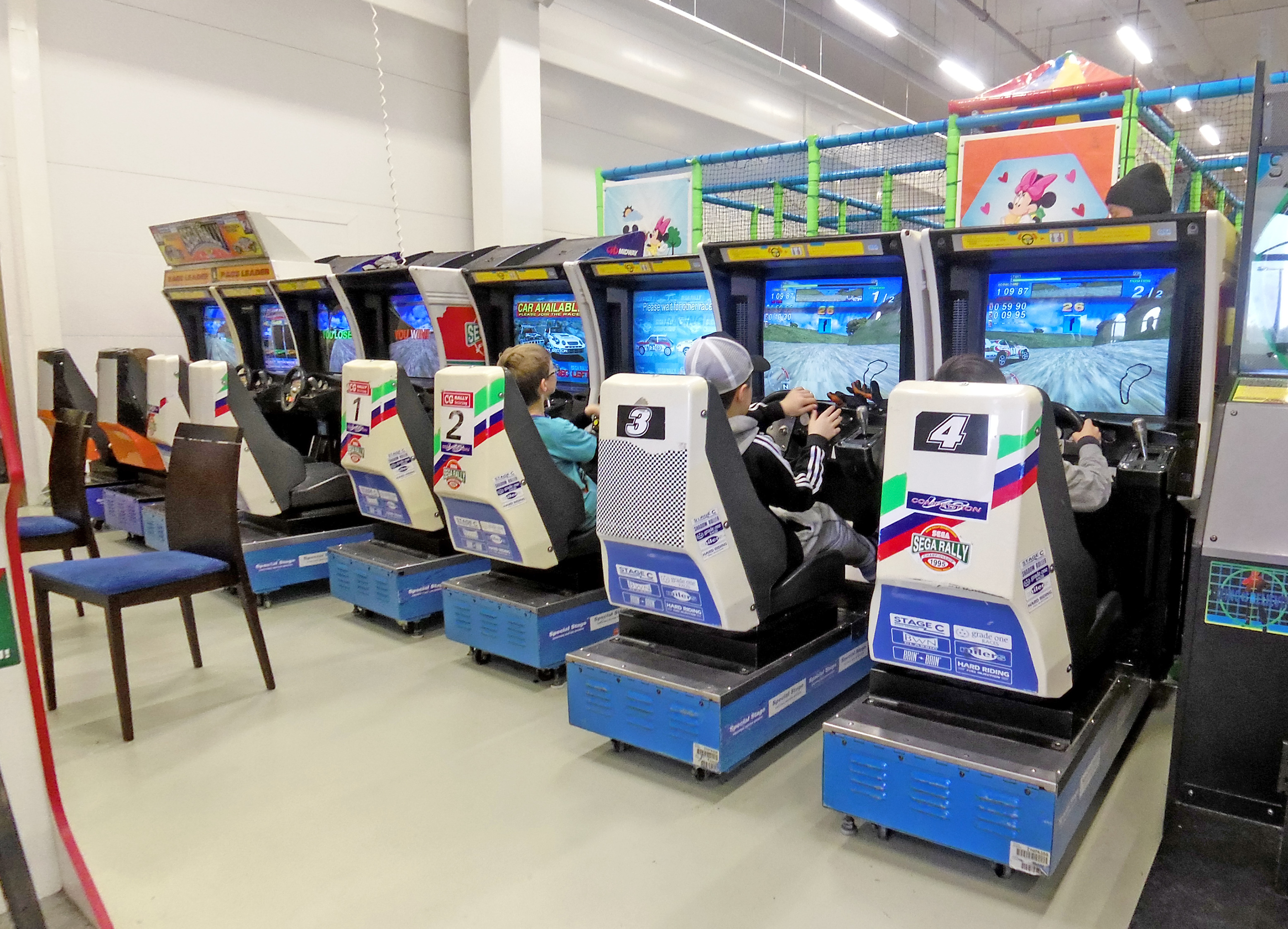
Sega Rally arcade racing games at the Veljekset Keskinen department store in Tuuri, Alavus, Finland in 2017

Many arcade games have short levels, simple and intuitive control schemes, and rapidly increasing difficulty. The classic formula for a successful arcade video game is "easy to learn, difficult to master" along with a "multiple life, progressively difficult level" paradigm. This is due to the environment of the arcade, where the player is essentially renting the game for as long as their in-game avatar can stay alive or until they run out of tokens. Games on consoles or PCs can be referred to as "arcade games" if they share these qualities, or are direct ports of arcade games.

Arcade racing games often have sophisticated motion simulator arcade cabinets, a simplified physics engine, and short learning time when compared with more realistic racing simulations. Cars can turn sharply without braking or understeer, and the AI rivals are sometimes programmed so they are always near the player with a rubberband effect. Other types of arcade-style games include music games (particularly rhythm games), and mobile and casual games with intuitive controls and short sessions.

=== Action ===
The term "arcade game" can refer to an action video game designed to play similarly to an arcade game with frantic, addictive gameplay. The focus of arcade action games is on the user's reflexes, and many feature very little puzzle-solving, complex thinking, or strategy skills. These include fighting games often played with an arcade controller, beat 'em up games including fast-paced hack and slash games, and light gun rail shooters and "bullet hell" shooters with intuitive controls and rapidly increasing difficulty.

Many arcade combat flight simulation games have sophisticated hydraulic motion simulator cabinets, and simplified physics and handling. Arcade flight games are meant to have an easy learning curve, in order to preserve their action component. Increasing numbers of console flight video games, such as Crimson Skies, Ace Combat, and Secret Weapons Over Normandy indicate the falling of manual-heavy flight sim popularity in favor of instant arcade flight action.

A modern subgenre of action games called "hack and slash" or "character action games" represent an evolution of traditional arcade action games, and are sometimes considered a subgenre of beat 'em up brawlers. This subgenre of games was largely defined by Hideki Kamiya, creator of the Devil May Cry and Bayonetta franchises.

== Industry ==
Arcade games are found in restaurants, bowling alleys, college campuses, video rental shops, dormitories, laundromats, movie theaters, supermarkets, shopping malls, airports, and other retail environments. They are popular in public places where people are likely to have free time.

Their profitability is expanded by the popularity of conversions of arcade games for home-based platforms. In 1997, WMS Industries (parent company of Midway Games) reported that if more than 5,000 arcade units are sold, at least 100,000 home version units will be sold.

The American Amusement Machine Association (AAMA) is a trade association established in 1981 that represents the American coin-operated amusement machine industry, including 120 arcade game distributors and manufacturers. The Japan Amusement Machine and Marketing Association (JAMMA) represents the Japanese arcade industry. Arcade machines may have standardized connectors or interfaces such as JAMMA, or JVS, that help with quick replacement of game systems or boards in arcade cabinets. The game boards or arcade boards may themselves allow for games to be replaced via game cartridges or discs.

== Conversions, emulators, and recreations ==
Prior to the 2000s, successful video games were often converted to a home video game console or home computer. Many of the initial Atari VCS games, for example, were conversions of Atari's success arcade games. Arcade game manufacturers that were not in the home console or computer business found licensing of their games to console manufacturers to be a successful business model, as console manufacturer competitors would vie for rights to more popular games. Coleco famously bested Atari to secure the rights to convert Nintendo's Donkey Kong, which it subsequently included as a pack-in game for the ColecoVision to challenge the VCS.

Arcade conversions typically had to make concessions for the lower computational power and capabilities of the home console, such as limited graphics or alterations in gameplay. Such conversions had mixed results. The Atari VCS conversion of Space Invaders was considered the VCS's killer application, helping to quadruple the VCS sales in 1980. In contrast, the VCS conversion of Pac-Man in 1982 was highly criticized for technical flaws due to VCS limitations such as flickering ghosts and simplified gameplay. Though Pac-Man was the best-selling game on the VCS, it eroded consumer confidence in Atari's games and partially contributed to the 1983 crash.

The need for arcade conversions began to wane as arcade game manufacturers like Nintendo, Sega, and SNK entered the home console market and used similar technology within their home consoles as found at the arcade, negating the need to simplify the game. Concessions still may be made for a home release; notably, the Super Nintendo Entertainment System conversion of Mortal Kombat removed much of the gore from the arcade version to meet Nintendo's quality control standards.

Exact copies of arcade video games can be run through emulators such as MAME on modern devices. An emulator is an application that translates foreign software onto a modern system, in real-time. Emulated games appeared legally and commercially on the Macintosh in 1994 with Williams floppy disks, Sony PlayStation in 1996, and Sega Saturn in 1997 with CD-ROM compilations such as Williams Arcade's Greatest Hits and Arcade's Greatest Hits: The Atari Collection 1, and on the PlayStation 2 and GameCube with DVD-ROM compilations such as Midway Arcade Treasures. Arcade games are downloaded and emulated through the Nintendo Wii Virtual Console service starting in 2009.

Using emulation, companies like Arcade1Up have produced at-scale or reduced-scale recreations of arcade cabinets using modern technology, such as LCD monitors and lightweight construction. These cabinets are typically designed to resemble the original arcade game cabinets, but may also support multiple related games. These cabinets can be offered in diverse and miniaturized styles, such as table-mounted and wall-mounted versions.

== Highest-grossing ==
For arcade games, success is usually judged by either the number of arcade hardware units sold to operators, or the amount of revenue generated. The revenue can include the coin drop earnings from coins (such as quarters, dollars, or 100 yen coins) inserted into machines, and/or the earnings from hardware sales with each unit costing thousands of dollars. Most of the revenue figures listed below are incomplete as they only include hardware sales revenue, due to a lack of available data for coin drop earnings which typically account for the majority of a hit arcade game's gross revenue. This list only includes arcade games that either sold more than 10,000 hardware units or generated a revenue of more than $10 million. Most of the games listed were released between the golden age of arcade video games (1978–1984) and the 1990s.

Game	Publisher	Release year	Hardware units sold	Estimated gross revenue (US$ without inflation)	Estimated gross revenue (US$ with 2025 inflation)
Pac-Man	Namco	1980	400,000 (until 1982)	$6 billion (until 1982)	$20 billion
Space Invaders	Taito	1978	750,000 (until 1979)	$3.8 billion (until 1982)	$18.8 billion
Street Fighter II	Capcom	1991	221,000+ (until 1995) (Note: Street Fighter II: Street Fighter II′: Champion Edition – 160,000+; Japan: 140,000; United States: 20,000+; Street Fighter II: The World Warrior – 60,000+; Super Street Fighter II – 1,000+ (US launch))	$5.31 billion+ (until 1999)	$12.6 billion
The King of Fighters '97	SNK	1997	150,000 (until 1998)		
Donkey Kong	Nintendo	1981	132,000 (until 1982) (Note: Donkey Kong: Japan: 65,000 of Donkey Kong.; United States: 67,000 of Donkey Kong.; 30,000 of Donkey Kong Jr. and 5000 of Donkey Kong 3.)	$280 million (until 1982) (US hardware sales)	$990 million (US hardware sales)
Ms. Pac-Man	Midway	1982	125,000 (until 1988)	$1.5 billion (until 1995)	$3.7 billion
Asteroids	Atari	1979	100,000 (until 2001)	$800 million (until 1991)	$2.83 billion
Defender	Williams	1981	70,000 (until 2020)	$1.5 billion (until 2020)	$2.69 billion
Print Club (Purikura)	Sega/Atlus	1995	45,000 (until 1997)	$1 billion (until 1997)	$2.11 billion
Centipede	Atari	1981	55,988 (until 1991)	$115.65 million (hardware sales until 1991)	$273 million (hardware sales)
Galaxian	Namco	1979	50,000 (in the US until 1982)		
Virtua Fighter	Sega	1993	40,000+ (until 1996)		
Virtua Fighter 2	Sega	1994	40,000+ (until 1996)		
Tekken 2	Namco	1995	40,000 (until 1996)		
Starhorse2	Sega	2005	38,614 (until 2009) (Note: StarHorse2: From April 2005 to March 2007: 18,079 units; StarHorse2: New Generation – 7,819 units from April 2005 to June 2006 (6,020 units in fiscal year ended March 2006, and 1,799 units during April–June 2006); StarHorse2: Second Fusion – 10,260 units from April 2006 to March 2007 (8,105 conversion kits during April–December 2006, and 2,155 body and satellite units in fiscal year ending March 2007); From April 2007 to March 2008: 10,275 units (756 body and satellite units of StarHorse2: Second Fusion during April–September 2007, and 9,519 conversion kits in fiscal year ended March 2008); From April 2009 to December 2009: 10,657 units of StarHorse2: Fifth Expansion)	$59.321 million (until 2011) (Fifth Expansion) (Note: StarHorse2: Fifth Expansion: Fiscal year ended 31 March 2010: ¥2.8 billion; Fiscal year ended 31 March 2011: ¥2 billion; Currency conversion: ¥2.8 billion = $34.6039 million; ¥2 billion = $24.7171 million)	$97.8 million (Fifth Expansion)
Hyper Olympic (Track & Field)	Konami	1983	38,000 (1983 in Japan)		
Tekken 3	Namco	1997	35,000 (in 1997)		
Donkey Kong Jr.	Nintendo	1982	30,000 (1982 in the US)		
Mr. Do!	Universal	1982	30,000 (1982 in the US)		
Karate Champ	Data East	1984	30,000 (in the US until 1985)		
Out Run	Sega	1986	30,000 (until 1994)	$100 million+ (cabinet sales)	$290 million (cabinet sales)
Final Fight	Capcom	1989	30,000 (until 1991)		
Virtua Fighter 3	Sega	1996	30,000 (until 1997)		
NBA Jam	Midway	1993	20,000 (until 2013)	$2 billion (until 2013)	$3.6 billion
World Club Champion Football	Sega	2002	2,479 (until 2009) (Note: World Club Champion Football series, unit sales: World Club Champion Football: European Clubs 2004–2005 – 514 units in fiscal year ending March 2006; World Club Champion Football: European Clubs 2004–2005 Ver. 2 – 276 units during April–September 2006 (240 satellite units during April–June 2006, and 36 body units during April–September 2006); World Club Champion Football: Intercontinental Clubs 2008–2009 – 1,689 units from June 2008 to December 2009 (Note: World Club Champion Football: Intercontinental Clubs: World Club Champion Football: Intercontinental Clubs 2006–2007 – 831 units from June 2008 to March 2009; World Club Champion Football: Intercontinental Clubs 2008–2009 – 858 units from April 2009 to December 2009))	$706.014 million (until 2012) (Note: World Club Champion Football series, revenue: Series revenues until March 2009 – $552.3 million; 480 million player cards sold. Prices could range from ¥300 for a single card from an arcade machine to ¥1000 for a starter pack. A¥1000 starter pack consists of 11 player cards, equivalent to ¥90.91 each. Total revenues from player card sales thus range from ¥43.64 billion (at ¥90.91 per card) to ¥144 billion (at ¥300 per card). In US dollars, this is equivalent to a range of $552.3 million to $1.82244 billion. The lowest value of $552.3 million will be assumed.; World Club Champion Football: Intercontinental Clubs revenues from April 2009 to June 2012 – $150.1 million (Note: World Club Champion Football: Intercontinental Clubs: Fiscal year ended 31 March 2010: ¥4.2 billion; Fiscal year ended 31 March 2011: ¥3.8 billion; Fiscal year ended 31 March 2012: ¥3.6 billion; 1st quarter ended 30 June 2012: ¥0.5 billion; Currency conversion: ¥4.2 billion = $51.9159 million; ¥3.8 billion = $46.9716 million; ¥3.6 billion = $44.8253 million; ¥0.5 billion = $6.3784 million))	$1.26 billion
Mortal Kombat II	Midway	1993	27,000 (until 2002)	$600 million (until 2002)	$1.16 billion
Frogger	Sega	1981		$135 million+(US hardware sales)	$478 million (US hardware sales)
Tempest	Atari	1981	29,000 (until 1983)	$62.408 million (hardware sales until 1991)	$148 million (hardware sales)
Q*bert	Gottlieb	1982	25,000 (until 2001)		
Teenage Mutant Ninja Turtles	Konami	1989	25,000 (US & EU until May 1990)		
Beatmania	Konami	1997	25,000 (until 2000)	$12.4 million (until 1998) (Japan hardware sales) (Note: Beatmania: ¥1 billion in May 1998; Yen-Dollar currency conversion: $12.4 million)	$24.9 million (Japan hardware sales)
Mortal Kombat	Midway	1992	24,000 (until 2002)	$570 million (until 2002)	$1.02 billion
Darkstalkers: The Night Warriors	Capcom	1994	24,000		
Robotron: 2084	Williams	1982	23,000 (until 1983)		
Pole Position	Namco	1982	21,000 (in the US until 1983)	$60.933 million (until 1983) (US hardware sales)	$203 million (US hardware sales)
Dig Dug	Namco	1982	22,228 (in the US until 1983)	$46.3 million (until 1983) (US hardware sales)	$154 million (US hardware sales)
Popeye	Nintendo	1982	20,000 (in the US until 1982)		
Vs. Super Mario Bros.	Nintendo	1986	20,000 (1986)		
Pump It Up	Andamiro	1999	20,000 (until 2005)		
Tekken Tag Tournament	Namco	1999	19,000 (until 2000)		
Jungle Hunt	Taito	1982	18,000 (in the US until 1983)		
Raiden	Tecmo	1990	17,000		
Killer Instinct	Midway	1994	17,000	$125 million+	$272 million+
Pokémon Mezastar	Takara Tomy	2020		$187 million+ (until 2021)	$187 million+
Dragon's Lair	Cinematronics	1983	16,000 (until 1983)	$68.8 million (hardware sales until 1983)	$222 million (hardware sales)
Asteroids Deluxe	Atari	1981	22,399 (until 1999)	$46.1 million (hardware sales until 1999)	$89.1 million (hardware sales)
Missile Command	Atari	1980	19,999 (until 2010)	$36.8 million (hardware sales until 1991)	$87 million (hardware sales)
Berzerk	Stern	1980	15,780 (until 1981)		
Scramble	Konami	1981	15,136 (until 1981)		
Champion Baseball	Sega	1983	15,000 (in Japan until June 1983)		
Mushiking: King of the Beetles	Sega	2003	13,500 (until 2005)	$530 million (until 2007) (Note: Mushiking: 420 million 100 yen coins = ¥42 billion; Currency conversion: $530 million)	$928 million
Battlezone	Atari	1980	15,122 (until 1999)	$31.2 million (hardware sales until 1999)	$60.3 million (hardware sales)
Stargate	Williams	1981	15,000 (until 1983)		
Space Duel	Atari	1982	12,038 (until 1991)		
Mahjong Fight Club 3	Konami	2004	13,000 (until 2004)		
Super Cobra	Konami	1981	12,337 (until 1981)		
Capcom Bowling	Capcom	1988	12,000 (until 1991)		
Sega Rally Championship	Sega	1994	12,000		
Oshare Majo: Love and Berry	Sega	2004	10,300 (until 2006)	$302.68 million (until 2007) (Note: Love and Berry: 240 million 100 yen coins = ¥24 billion; Currency conversion: $302.68 million)	$516 million
Double Dragon	Technōs	1987	10,000+ (US in 1988)		
Street Fighter	Capcom	1987	10,000+ (until 1991)		
Dance Dance Revolution	Konami	1998	10,000+ (until 1999)		
Wheels / Wheels II (Speed Race)	Taito	1974	10,000 (1975 in the US)		
Gee Bee	Namco	1978	10,000		
Big Buck Hunter Pro	Raw Thrills	2006	10,000 (until 2009)		
World Club Champion Football: Intercontinental Clubs	Sega	2008	1,689 (until 2009)	$150.1 million (until 2012)	$224 million
Pokémon Battrio	Takara Tomy	2007		$125 million+ (until 2012)	$194 million+
StarHorse3 Season I: A New Legend Begins	Sega	2011		$132.18 million (until 2012) (Note: StarHorse3 Season I: A New Legend Begins: Fiscal year ended March 2012: ¥10.1 billion; 1st Quarter Ended 30 June 2012: ¥0.5 billion; Currency conversion: ¥10.1 billion = $125.8 million; ¥0.5 billion = $6.3784 million)	$189 million
Pokémon Tretta	Takara Tomy	2012		$125 million+ (until 2014)	$175 million+
Border Break	Sega	2009	2,998 (until 2009)	$107 million (until 2012) (Note: Border Break: Fiscal year ended 31 March 2010: ¥3.3 billion; Fiscal year ended 31 March 2011: ¥2.5 billion; Fiscal year ended 31 March 2012: ¥2.3 billion; 1st Quarter Ended 30 June 2012: ¥0.5 billion; Currency conversion: ¥3.3 billion = $40.7317 million; ¥2.5 billion = $30.8542 million; ¥2.3 billion = $28.6371 million; ¥0.5 billion = $6.3784 million)	$161 million
Tron	Midway	1982	800 (in the US until 1982)	$45 million (until 1983)	$102 million
Sengoku Taisen	Sega	2010		$94.04 million (until 2012) (Note: Sengoku Taisen: Fiscal year ended 31 March 2011: ¥6.4 billion; Fiscal year ended 31 March 2012: ¥1.2 billion; Currency conversion: ¥6.4 billion = $79.1 million; ¥1.2 billion = $14.94 million)	$139 million
Pokémon Ga-Olé	Takara Tomy	2016		$92 million+ (until 2018)	$123 million+
Dragon Quest: Monster Battle Road	Square Enix	2007		$78.2 million (until 2008) (Note: Dragon Quest: Monster Battle Road: ¥4.5 billion from June 2007 to March 2008; Currency conversion: $56.731 million; ¥1.7 billion from April 2008 to September 2008; Currency conversion: $21.4317 million)	$121 million
Samba de Amigo	Sega	1999	3,000 (until 2000)	$47.11 million (until 2000) (Note: Samba de Amigo: ¥3.84 billion: Currency conversion: $47.11 million)	$91 million
Sangokushi Taisen 3	Sega	2007		$54.4 million (until 2011) (Note: Sangokushi Taisen 3: Fiscal year ended 31 March 2010: ¥1.8 billion; Fiscal year ended 31 March 2011: ¥2.6 billion; Currency conversion: ¥1.8 billion = $22.2401 million; ¥2.6 billion = $32.1248 million)	$84.5 million
Pong	Atari	1972	8,500–19,000	$11 million (until 1973)	$79.8 million
Lord of Vermilion	Square Enix	2008		$50.443 million (until 2008) (Note: Lord of Vermilion: ¥4 billion: Currency conversion: $50.443 million)	$75.4 million
Sega Network Mahjong MJ4	Sega	2008	12,892 (until 2009) (Note: Sega Network Mahjong MJ4: Fiscal year ended March 2008: 10,427; Fiscal year ended March 2009: 2,465)	$47 million (until 2010) (Note: Fiscal year ended 31 March 2010: ¥3.8 billion: Currency conversion: $47 million)	$70.3 million
Kangaroo	Sunsoft	1982	9,803 (until 1983)	$20.58 million (until 1983) (US hardware sales)	$68.7 million (US hardware sales)
Hard Drivin'	Atari	1989	3,318 (until 1989)	$22.9 million (until 1989)	$59.5 million
Gauntlet	Atari	1985	7,848 (until 1985)	$18.01 million (until 1985)	$53.9 million
Sega Network Mahjong MJ5	Sega	2011		$34.87 million (until 2012) (Note: Fiscal year ended March 2012: ¥2.8 billion: Currency conversion: $34.87 million)	$49.9 million
Millipede	Atari	1982	9,990 (until 1991)	$20.669 million (until 1991)	$48.9 million
Race Drivin'	Atari	1990	3,525 (until 1991)	$20.03 million (until 1991)	$47.3 million
Breakout	Atari	1976	15,000 (until 1981)	$12.045 million (hardware sales until 1981)	$42.7 million
Time Traveler	Sega	1991		$18 million (until 1991)	$42.5 million
Space Ace	Cinematronics	1984		$13 million (until 1984)	$40.3 million
Xevious	Namco	1982	5,295 (in the US until 1983)	$11.1 million (until 1983) (US hardware sales)	$37 million (US hardware sales)
Atari Football	Atari	1978	11,306 (until 1999)	$17.266 million (until 1999)	$33.4 million
Final Lap	Namco	1987	1,150 (in the US until 1988)	$9.5 million (until 1988) (US hardware sales)	$26.9 million (US hardware sales)
Paperboy	Atari	1984	3,442 (until 1991)	$8.6 million (until 1991)	$20.3 million
Star Wars	Atari	1983	12,695 (until 1991)	$7.595 million (until 1991)	$18 million
Sprint 2	Atari	1976	8,200 (until 1999)	$12.669 million (until 1999)	$24.5 million
Championship Sprint	Atari	1986	3,595 (until 1991)	$8.26 million (until 1991)	$19.5 million
Pole Position II	Namco	1983	2,400 (in the US until 1983)	$7.43 million (until 1983) (US hardware sales)	$24 million (US hardware sales)
Sea Wolf	Midway	1976	10,000 (until 2000)		
Lunar Lander	Atari	1979	4,830 (until 1999)	$8.19 million (until 1999)	$15.8 million
Super Sprint	Atari	1986	2,232 (until 1999)	$7.8 million (until 1999)	$15.1 million
Marble Madness	Atari	1984	4,000 (until 1985)	$6.3 million (until 1991)	$14.9 million
Rolling Thunder	Namco	1986	2,406 (in the US until 1987)	$4.8 million (until 1987) (US hardware sales)	$14.1 million (US hardware sales)
Arabian	Sunsoft	1983	1,950 (in the US until 1983)	$3.9 million (until 1983) (US hardware sales)	$12.6 million (US hardware sales)

=== Franchises ===
These are the combined hardware sales of at least two or more arcade games that are part of the same franchise. This list only includes franchises that have sold at least 5,000 hardware units or grossed at least $10 million revenues.

Franchise	Publisher	Original release year	Total hardware units sold	Estimated gross revenue (US$ without inflation)	Estimated gross revenue (US$ with 2025 inflation)
Pac-Man	Namco	1980	526,412 (until 1988) (Note: Pac-Man series: Pac-Man: 400,000; Ms. Pac-Man: 125,000; Pac-Mania: 1,412)	$6 billion (until 1982)	$20 billion
Space Invaders	Taito	1978	750,000 (until 1980)	$3.8 billion (until 1982)	$18.8 billion
Street Fighter	Capcom	1987	500,000 (until 2002)	$5.31 billion+ (until 1999)	$12.6 billion
Pac-Man clones	—	1980	300,000 (until 2002)		
Street Fighter clones	—	1987	200,000+		
Mario	Nintendo	1981	190,800 (until 1983) (Note: Mario series: Donkey Kong series: 167,000; Mario Bros.: 3,800; Vs. Super Mario Bros.: 20,000)	$280 million (until 1982) (US hardware sales)	$992 million (US hardware sales)
Donkey Kong	Nintendo	1981	167,000 (until 1983)	$280 million (until 1982) (US hardware sales)	$992 million (US hardware sales)
Asteroids	Atari	1979	136,437 (until 1999) (Note: Asteroids series: Asteroids: 100,000; Asteroids sequels: Asteroids Deluxe: 22,399; Space Duel: 12,038; Blasteroids: 2,000)	$850.79 million (until 1999) (Note: Asteroids series: Asteroids: $800 million in 1991; Asteroids sequels: Asteroids Deluxe: $46.1 million in 1999; Blasteroids: $4.69 million in 1991)	$1.64 billion
Virtua Fighter	Sega	1993	110,000+ (Note: Virtua Fighter series arcade unit sales: Virtua Fighter – 40,000 (as of 1996); Virtua Fighter 2 – 40,000+ (as of 1996); Virtua Fighter 3 – 30,000 (as of 1997))		
Golden Tee Golf	Incredible Technologies	1989	100,000 (until 2011)		
Data Carddass	Bandai	2005	100,000 (until 2012)		
Tekken	Namco	1994	94,000+ (Note: Tekken series arcade unit sales: Tekken 2 – 40,000 (as of 1996); Tekken 3 – 35,000 (as of 1997); Tekken Tag Tournament – 19,000 (as of 2000))		
Defender	Williams	1981	85,000 (until 2020) (Note: Defender series: Defender: 70,000; Stargate: 15,000)	$1.5 billion (until 2020)	$2.69 billion
Centipede	Atari	1981	65,978 (until 1991) (Note: Centipede series: Centipede: 55,988; Millipede: 9,990)	$136.3 million (until 1991) (Note: Centipede series: Centipede: $115.65 million; Millipede: $20.669 million)	$322 million
Mortal Kombat	Midway	1992	51,000 (until 2002)	$1.17 billion (until 200)	$2.09 billion
Galaxian	Namco	1979	50,986 (in the US until 1988) (Note: Galaxian series: Galaxian: 50,000 in the US; Galaga '88: 986 in the US)		
Pokémon arcade games	Takara Tomy	2007		$530 million+ (until 2021)	$832 million+
Starhorse	Sega	2000	38,734 (until 2009) (Note: StarHorse series: Starhorse Progress – 120 in fiscal year ended March 2005; StarHorse2 – 38,614 until 2009)	$191.501 million (until 2012) (Note: Starhorse series, 2009–2011: Starhorse2 – $59.321 million; StarHorse3 Season I: A New Legend Begins – $132.18 million)	$358 million
Bemani	Konami	1997	35,000+ (until 2000) (Note: Bemani series, sales: Beatmania as of 2000: 25,000; Dance Dance Revolution as of 1999: 10,000+)	$12.4 million (until 1998) (Beatmania hardware sales in Japan)	$24.9 million (Beatmania hardware sales in Japan)
Big Buck	Incredible Technologies/Raw Thrills	2000	33,500 (until 2010) (Note: Big Buck series: Big Buck Hunter series sales until April 2007: 22,500 units, including 7,500 Big Buck Hunter Pro units.; Series sales after April 2007 until September 2009: additional 2,500 Big Buck Hunter Pro units and 5,500 Big Buck Safari units.; Big Buck Hunter Pro: Open Season sales from September 2009 to January 2010: 3,000 units)		
Mr. Do!	Universal	1982	30,000 (in the US until 1982)		
Dragon Quest: Monster Battle Road	Square Enix	2007		$78.2 million (until 2008)	$121 million
Lord of Vermilion	Square Enix	2008		$50.443 million (until 2008)	$75.4 million
Scramble	Konami	1981	27,473 (until 1981)		
Sega Network Mahjong	Sega	2000	25,986 (until 2006) (Note: Sega Network Mahjong MJ series: Sega Network Mahjong MJ2 from April 2004 to June 2005: 5,486 units (Note: Sega Network Mahjong MJ2: April 2004 to March 2005: 4,984; April 2005 to June 2005: 502); Sega Network Mahjong MJ3 from April 2005 to March 2006: 7,608 units; Sega Network Mahjong MJ4 from April 2007 to March 2009: 12,892 (Note: Sega Network Mahjong MJ4: Fiscal year ended March 2008: 10,427; Fiscal year ended March 2009: 2,465))	$81.87 million (until 2012) (Note: Sega Network Mahjong MJ series, 2009–2012: Sega Network Mahjong MJ4: $47 million in fiscal year 2010; Sega Network Mahjong MJ5: $34.87 million in fiscal year 2012)	$153 million
Darkstalkers	Capcom	1994	27,000+		
Pole Position	Namco	1982	24,550 (in the US until 1983) (Note: Pole Position series US sales: Pole Position: 21,000; Pole Position sequels: Pole Position II: 2,400; Final Lap: 1,150)	$77.9 million (until 1988) (US hardware sales) (Note: Pole Position series US sales: Pole Position: $60.933 million in 1983; Pole Position II: $7.43 million in 1983; Final Lap: $9.5 million in 1988)	$260 million (US hardware sales)
Dig Dug	Namco	1982	22,228 (in the US until 1983)	$46.3 million (until 1983) (US hardware sales)	$154 million (US hardware sales)
Pump It Up	Andamiro	1999	20,000 (until 2005)		
Breakout	Atari	1976	15,805 (until 1999)	$17.745 million (until 1999)	$34.3 million
Star Wars	Atari	1983	14,039 (until 1991)	$9.275 million (until 1983)	$21.9 million
Sprint	Atari	1976	14,027 (until 1999)	$28.729 million (until 1999)	$55.5 million
Mushiking	Sega	2003	13,500 (until 2005)	$530 million (until 2007)	$928 million
Sea Wolf	Midway	1976	14,000 (until 2000)		
Mahjong Fight Club	Konami	2002	13,000 (until 2004)		
Gauntlet	Atari	1985	11,368 (until 1991)	$20.41 million (until 1991)	$48.2 million
Love and Berry	Sega	2004	10,300 (until 2006)	$302.68 million (until 2007)	$516 million
Sangokushi Taisen	Sega	2005	9,929 (until 2008) (Note: Sangokushi Taisen series: Sales from January 2005 to September 2006: 5,153 units; Sangokushi Taisen from January 2005 to March 2006: 1,942 units (Note: Sangokushi Taisen: As of March 2005: 421; April 2005 to March 2006: 1,521); Sangokushi Taisen 2 during April–September 2006: 3,211 units; Sales from April 2007 to March 2008: 4,776; 166 body units of Sangokushi Taisen 2 during April–September 2007; 4,610 satellite units of Sangokushi Taisen from April 2007 to March 2008)	$148.44 million (until 2012) (Note: Sangokushi Taisen series, 2009–2011: Sangokushi Taisen 3: $54.4 million; Sengoku Taisen: $94.04 million)	$245 million
Pong	Atari	1972	8500–19,000	$11 million (until 1973)	$79.8 million
Hard Drivin'	Atari	1989	6,843 (until 1991)	$42.93 million (until 1991)	$75.48 million
Samba de Amigo	Sega	1999	3,000 (until 2000)	$47.11 million (until 2000) (Note: Samba de Amigo: ¥3.84 billion: Currency conversion: $47.11 million)	$91 million
Border Break	Sega	2009	2,998 (until 2009)	$107 million (until 2012)	$161 million
World Club Champion Football	Sega	2012	2,479 (until 2015)	$706.014 million (until 2012) (Note: World Club Champion Football series, revenue: Series revenues until March 2009 – $552.3 million; 480 million player cards sold. Prices could range from ¥300 for a single card from an arcade machine to ¥1000 for a starter pack. A¥1000 starter pack consists of 11 player cards, equivalent to ¥90.91 each. Total revenues from player card sales thus range from ¥43.64 billion (at ¥90.91 per card) to ¥144 billion (at ¥300 per card). In US dollars, this is equivalent to a range of $552.3 million to $1.82244 billion. The lowest value of $552.3 million will be assumed.; World Club Champion Football: Intercontinental Clubs revenues from April 2009 to June 2012 – $150.1 million)	$1.26 billion

== See also ==
- Claw crane
- JAMMA
- List of arcade video games
- Medal game
- Money booth
- Neo Geo
- Winners Don't Use Drugs
