= List of quiz arcade games =

This is a list of video and pre-video (electro-mechanical) quiz arcade games. All are coin-operated arcade machines.

Game	Release date	Publisher	Side notes
== A ==
A Question of Sport	1992	Bell-Fruit Manufacturing Company	
Answer X Answer	2007	Sega Enterprises, Ltd. (of Tokyo, Japan)	
Athena No Hatena?	1993	Athena	
== B ==
Bakuretsu Quiz Ma-Q Dai Bouken	1992	Namco	
Big Bucks Trivia	1986	Dynasoft	
== C ==
Capcom World: Adventure Quiz	1989	Capcom	
Capcom World 2: Adventure Quiz	1992	Capcom	
Cash Quiz	1986	Zilec-Zenitone	
Chevrolet I.Q. Computer	Early 1970s	Modec, Inc.	
Chibi Maruko-chan: Maruko Deluxe Quiz	1995	Takara	
Computer Quiz	1968	Nutting Associates (of Mountain View, CA)	
Crayon Shin-chan: Ora To Asobo	1993	Taito (of Japan)	
== D ==
Daisu-Kiss	1996	Konami	
Date Quiz Go! Go!	1998	SemiCom	
Date Quiz Go! Go!: Episode 2	2000	SemiCom	
Derby Quiz: My Dream Horse	1998	Namco	
Dramatic Adventure Quiz: Keith & Lucy	1993	Visco Corporation	
Dual-IQ Computer	1970	Nutting Associates (of Mountain View, CA)	
== E ==
Every Second Counts	1990	Bell-Fruit Manufacturing Company	
== F ==
Family Planning Computer	Early 1970s	Modec, Inc.	
Fax	1983	Exidy	
== G ==
Gals Panic II: Quiz Edition	1993	Kaneko	
Golf-IQ	1970	Nutting Associates (of Mountain View, CA)	
Gourmet Battle Quiz: Ryorioh Cooking	1998	Visco Corporation	
Great Quiz Detective	1991	SNK	
== H ==
Hatena? No Dai Bouken: Adventure Quiz 2	1990	Capcom	
Hayaoshi Quiz: Grand Champion Taikai	1994	Jaleco	
Hayaoshi Quiz: Nettou Namahousou	1994	Jaleco	
Hayaoshi Quiz: Ouza Ketteisen	1994	Jaleco	
Hayaoshi Taisen Quiz HYHOO	1987	Nichibutsu (of Osaka, Japan)	
Hayaoshi Taisen Quiz HYHOO 2	1987	Nichibutsu (of Osaka, Japan)	
== I ==
Inquizitor	1989	Bell-Fruit Manufacturing Company	
Intelligence Computer	1970	Taito (of Japan)	
I.Q. Computer	Early 1970s	Nutting Associates (of Mountain View, CA)	
== K ==
Kaiun Quiz	1999	Namco	
Karaoke Quiz Intro Don Don!	1996	Sunsoft	
Kirameki Star Road: Intro Club	1997	Taito (of Japan)	
Kosodate Quiz My Angel	1996	Namco	
Kosodate Quiz My Angel 2	1997	Namco	
Kosodate Quiz My Angel 3	1998	Namco	
== L ==
Laser Quiz	1995	CD Express	
Laser Quiz 2	1995	CD Express	
Live Quiz Show	1999	Andamiro	
== M ==
Mainichi Kawaru Quiz Bangumi: Quiz 365	1994	Nakanihon	
Master Boy	1991	Gaelco (of Barcelona, Spain)	
Milwaukee I.Q.	Early 1970s	Modec, Inc.	
Miyasu Nonki No Quiz 18-kin	1992	EIM	
Moriguchi Hiroko No Quiz De Hyuu! Hyuu! (Also known as "森口博子のクイズでヒューヒュー" in Japan)	1995	Taito (of Japan)	
== N ==
Nettoh Quiz Champion	1995	Nakanihon	
Nettou! Gekitou! Quiztou!!	1993	Namco	
== P ==
Professor Pac-Man	1983	Midway Games	
Professor Quizmaster	1970	Mondial International, Inc. (of New York, NY)	
== Q ==
Quadro Quiz II	1985	Status Games	
Quiz	1991	Elettronolo	
Quiz: Ah! My Goddess	2000	Sega Enterprises, Ltd. (of Tokyo, Japan)	
Quiz & Dragons: Capcom Quiz Game	1992	Capcom	
Quiz & Variety: Sukusuku Inufuku	1998	Video System Company, Ltd.	
Quiz Bishoujo Senshi Sailor Moon: Chiryoku Tairyoku Toki No Un	1997	Banpresto	
Quiz Channel Question	1993	Nakanihon	
Quiz Chikyu Bouei Gun	1992	Taito (of Japan)	
Quiz Crayon Shin-chan	1993	Taito (of Japan)	
Quiz Daisousa Sen: The Last Count Down	1991	SNK	
Quiz De Idol! Hot Debut	2000	Psikyo/Moss	
Quiz DNA No Hanran	1992	Face	
Quiz Do Re Mi Fa Grand Prix	1994	Konami	
Quiz Do Re Mi Fa Grand Prix 2: Shin-Kyoku Nyuukadayo	1995	Konami	
Quiz F-1 1,2 Finish	1992	Irem	
Quiz Gakuen Paradise	1991	NMK	
Quiz Gakumon No Susume	1993	Konami	
Quiz Gekiretsu Scramble: Gakuen Paradise 2	1992	Face	
Quiz Ghost Hunter: The Quiz Adventure	1994	Sega Enterprises, Ltd. (of Tokyo, Japan)	
Quiz H.Q.	1990	Taito (of Japan)	
Quizimodo	1991	Gottlieb & Company (of Chicago, IL)	
Quiz Jinsei Gekijoh	1993	Taito (of Japan)	
Quiz Jump	1983	Sanritsu	
Quiz K Tie Q Mode	2002	Amedio	
Quiz King of Fighters	1995	Saurus	
Quiz Kokology: Quiz & Shinri Game	1992	Tecmo	
Quiz Kokology 2: Quiz & Shinri Game	1993	Tecmo	
Quiz Magic Academy	2003	Konami	
Quiz Magic Academy II	2004	Konami	
Quiz Magic Academy III	2005	Konami	
Quiz Magic Academy IV	2007	Konami	
Quiz Magic Academy V	2008	Konami	
Quiz Magic Academy VI	2009	Konami	
Quiz Magic Academy VII	2010	Konami	
Quiz Magic Academy VIII	2011	Konami	
Quiz Magical Brain	1996	Sega Enterprises, Ltd. (of Tokyo, Japan)	
Quiz Mahjong! Hayaku Yatteyo	1991	Nichibutsu (of Osaka, Japan)	
Quizmaster	1985	Coinmaster	
Quiz Meintantei Neo-Geo: Quiz Daisousa Sen Part 2	1992	SNK	
Quiz Mekurumeku Story	1994	Sega Enterprises, Ltd. (of Tokyo, Japan)	
Quiz Nanairo Dreams - Nijiirochou No Kiseki	1996	Capcom	
Quiz Olympic	1985	Seoul Coin	
Quiz Omaeni Pipon Cho!	1996	Data East	
Quiz Panicuru Fantasy	1993	NMK	
Quiz Quest: Hime To Yuusha No Monogatari	1991	Taito (of Japan)	
Quiz Rouka Ni Tattenasai	1985	Sega Enterprises, Ltd. (of Tokyo, Japan)	
Quiz Sangokushi Chiryaku No Hasha	1991	Capcom	
Quiz Sekai Wa Show by Shobai	1993	Taito (of Japan)	
Quiz Show	1976	Kee Games	
Quiz Syukudai Wo Wasuremashita	1991	Sega Enterprises, Ltd. (of Tokyo, Japan)	
Quiz Theater: Mittsu No Monogatari	1994	Taito (of Japan)	
Quiz Tonosama No Yabou	1991	Capcom	
Quiz Tonosama No Yabou 2: Zenkoku-ban	1995	Capcom	
Quiz Torimonochou	1990	Taito (of Japan)	
Quizvaders	1991	Bell-Fruit Manufacturing Company	
== S ==
Seishun Quiz Colorful High School	2002	Namco	
Sports World	1970	Nutting Associates (of Mountain View, CA)	
SunA Quiz 6000 Academy	1994	SunA	
Super Triv-Quiz	1986	Status Games	
== T ==
Taisen Quiz Hyhoo	1987	Nichibutsu (of Osaka, Japan)	
Taisen Quiz Hyhoo 2	1987	Nichibutsu (of Osaka, Japan)	
Tic Tac Quiz	1976	Sega Enterprises, Ltd. (of Tokyo, Japan)	
Treble Top	1991	Bell-Fruit Manufacturing Company	
Triv-Quiz	1984	Status Games	
TV Gassyuukoku Quiz Q&Q / Quiz TV Variety Show	1992	Dynax	
== U ==
Ultra Quiz	1983	Taito (of Japan)	
== V ==
Vision Quest	1991	Nova	LaserDisc-based game also known as Revelations.
== W ==
Wizz Quiz	1985	Zilec-Zenitone	
== Y ==
Yuuyu no Quiz de GO! GO!	1990	Taito (of Japan)	
