= Starhorse =

Japanese horse racing arcade game

- Genre: Horse racing
- Arcade system: Sega

Starhorse is a Sega horse racing arcade game which allows players to gamble for tokens. The first in the Starhorse series appeared in 2000; it was followed by Starhorse 2001, Starhorse 2002, Starhorse Progress (2003), Starhorse2 New Generation (2005) and Starhorse Progress Returns (2009 sequel to Starhorse Progress.). Starhorse2 Second Fusion (2006) has the ability to simulate actual Japan Racing Association events. It was followed by StarHorse3 (2011).

In 2009, at least 10,657 machines of Starhorse2 Fifth Expansion (2009) alone had been sold to arcade operators, and by March 2011, the same game had grossed ¥4.8 billion from machine sales, equivalent to nearly $60 million. (Note: StarHorse2: Fifth Expansion: Fiscal year ended March 31, 2010: ¥2.8 billion; Fiscal year ended March 31, 2011: ¥2 billion; Currency conversion: ¥2.8 billion = $34.6039 million; ¥2 billion = $24.7171 million) In 2011, StarHorse3 Season I: A New Legend Begins (2011) grossed ¥3.3 billion from arcade machine sales, equivalent to more than $40 million. (Note: Nine months ended December 31, 2011: ¥3.3 billion: ¥3.3 billion = $40.8 million)

Starhorse 4 has a bilateral collaboration with Umamusume: Pretty Derby that includes characters from Umamusume appearing in Starhorse 4 and the Grand Masters, one of the most prestigious events available in Starhorse, appearing as an Umamusume Career Mode scenario.
