= Wraparound (video games) =

Video game mechanic where opposite screen edges are connected

Wraparound, in video games, is when an object moves off of one side of the screen and reappears on the other side. In Asteroids, for example, the player's ship flies off of the right side of the screen, then continues on the left side with the same velocity. This is referred to as wraparound, since the top and bottom of the screen wrap around to meet, as do the left and right sides (topologically equivalent to a Euclidean 2-torus).

Some games wrap around in certain directions but not others, such as Joust (1982), which wraps left to right but not top to bottom (that is, the game world is topologically equivalent to a cylinder). Some games such as Asteroids have no boundary and objects can travel over any part of the screen edge and reappear on the other side. Others such as Pac-Man, Wizard of Wor, and some games in the Bomberman series, have a boundary surrounding most of the playing area, but have a few paths connecting the left side to the right, or the top to the bottom, that characters can travel on.

In contrast, some games such as Defender (1981) do not allow objects to leave one edge of the screen and reenter by the other, but do have a toroidal game world, in the sense that flying far enough in one direction will lead the player back where they started. Manifold Garden (2019) applies the same "world-wrapping" in three dimensions.

== History ==
1962's Spacewar! has a wraparound playfield, as does the first commercial arcade video game, Computer Space (1971). Wraparound was common in games throughout the 1970s and early 1980s, including Space Race (1973), Combat (1977), Asteroids (1979), and Star Castle (1980). Surround (1977) for the Atari 2600 has a gameplay option called "wraparound" in the manual.

== Examples ==
Notable examples of video games that employed wraparound mechanics:

- Pac-Man (1980): When Pac-Man reaches the edge of the screen, he reappears on the opposite side, enabling continuous movement through the maze.
- Asteroids (1979): In this arcade shooter, the game space wraps around. Many Asteroids-inspired games, such as Geometry Wars, also do this.
- Super Mario Bros. series (1985-present): Many entries in the Super Mario Bros. franchise utilize wraparound, particularly in platforming levels.

== See also ==
- Flip-screen
- Warp (video games)
