= Galaxy Game =

1971 arcade game

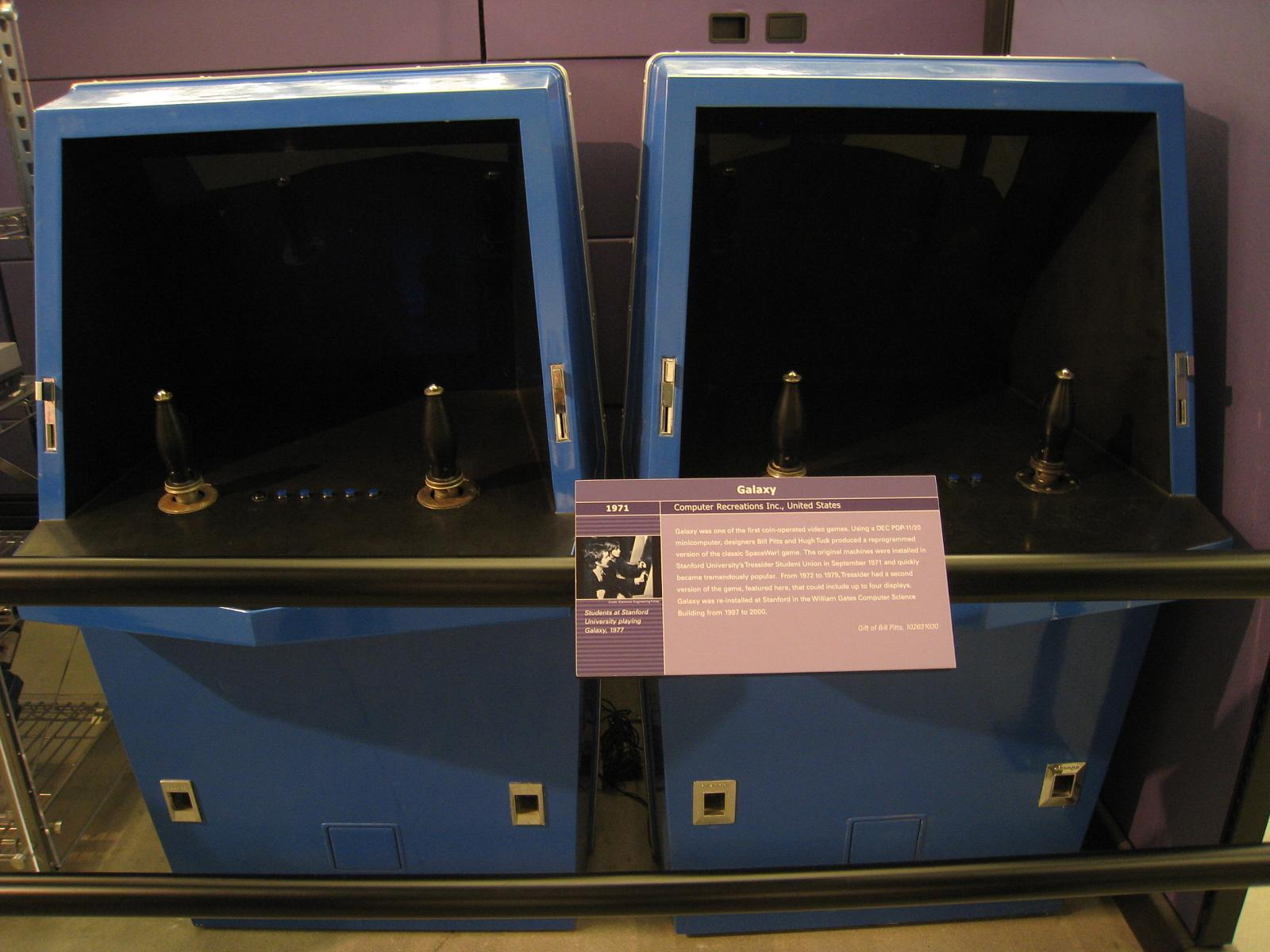
- Galaxy Game at the Computer History Museum
- Designers: Bill Pitts; Hugh Tuck
- Platform: Arcade (PDP-11)
- Release: WW: November 1971
- Genre: Space combat simulation
- Mode: Multiplayer

Galaxy Game is a space combat arcade game developed in 1971 during the early era of video games. Galaxy Game is an expanded version of the 1962 Spacewar!, potentially the first video game to spread to multiple computer installations. It features two spaceships, "the needle" and "the wedge", engaged in a dogfight while maneuvering in the gravity well of a star. Both ships are controlled by human players.

Created by Bill Pitts and Hugh Tuck, the initial prototype cost US$20,000 (equivalent to about $159,000 in 2025) to build. It consisted of a Digital Equipment Corporation PDP-11 minicomputer attached by a cable to a wooden console with a monitor, controls, and seats. It charged players 10 cents per game or 25 cents for three, and drew crowds "ten-deep". This was one of the first coin-operated video games; the prototype was installed in November 1971 at the Tresidder student union building at Stanford University, only a few months after a similar display of a prototype of Computer Space, making it the second known video game to charge money to play.

The pair built a second prototype, replacing the first in Tresidder in June 1972. It featured the capability to play multiple games simultaneously on four monitors, though due to space restrictions only two consoles with monitors were actually installed. These consoles had a blue fiberglass casing, and the PDP-11 was housed inside one of the consoles. By the time of its installation, the pair had spent US$65,000 (equivalent to about $500,000 in 2025) on the project, but were unable to make the game commercially viable.

The second prototype remained in the student union building until 1979, when the display processor became faulty. It was restored and placed in the Stanford computer science department in 1997, then moved to the Computer History Museum in 2000, where it remains as of 2017.

== Background ==
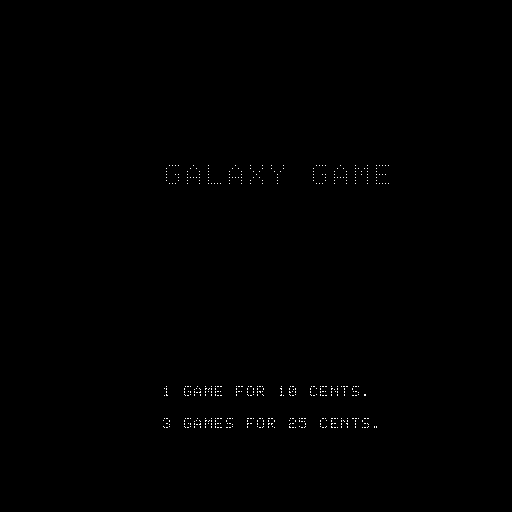
Title screen of Galaxy Game

At the beginning of the 1970s, video games existed almost entirely as novelties passed around by programmers and technicians with access to computers, primarily at research institutions and large companies. One of these games was Spacewar!, created in 1962 for the Digital Equipment Corporation (DEC) PDP-1 minicomputer by Steve Russell and others in the programming community at the Massachusetts Institute of Technology. The two-player game has the players engage in a dogfight between two spaceships, set against the backdrop of a starfield, with a central star exerting gravitational force upon the ships. The game was copied to several of the early minicomputer installations in American academic institutions after its initial release, making it potentially the first video game to be available outside a single research institute. Spacewar was extremely popular in the small programming community in the 1960s and was widely recreated on other minicomputer and mainframe computers of the time, later migrating to early microcomputer systems. Early computer scientist Alan Kay noted in 1972 that "the game of Spacewar blossoms spontaneously wherever there is a graphics display connected to a computer," and contributor Martin Graetz recalled in 1981 that as the game initially spread it could be found on "just about any research computer that had a programmable CRT". Although the game was widespread for the era, it was still very limited in its direct reach: the PDP-1 was priced at US$120,000 (equivalent to about $954,000 in 2025) and only 55 were ever sold, most without a monitor, which prohibited the original Spacewar or any game of the time from reaching beyond a narrow, academic audience. The original developers of Spacewar considered ways to monetize the game, but saw no options given the high price of the computer it ran on.

In 1966, Stanford University student Bill Pitts, who had a hobby of exploring the steam tunnels and buildings of the campus, broke into a building he found out to be the location of the Stanford Artificial Intelligence Project, which held a DEC PDP-6 time-sharing computer system with 20 Teletype consoles connected to it. Fascinated by the computer and having taken several introductory computer classes, Pitts convinced the head of the project, Lester Earnest, to let him use the computer after hours. Soon, Pitts had ceased going to classes, instead spending his nights in the computer lab interacting with the graduate and postgraduate students and playing Spacewar on the PDP-6. Pitts often played against Hugh Tuck, a student at California Polytechnic State University who was a friend from high school. During one Spacewar session that took place, depending on the source, between 1966 and 1969, Tuck remarked that a coin-operated version of the game would be very successful. Such a device was still unfeasible due to the cost of computers, and the pair did not pursue the project. In 1971, however, Pitts, who by then had graduated and was working at Lockheed as a PDP-10 programmer, learned of the 1970 DEC PDP-11, which was sold for around US$14,000. While this was still too high for a commercially viable product, as most electronic games in arcades cost around US$1,000 at the time, Tuck and Pitts felt it was low enough to build a prototype to determine interest and optimal per-game pricing.

== Gameplay ==
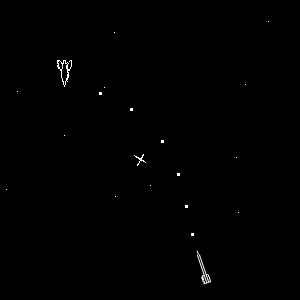
Recreation of Spacewar! in Java, with similar gameplay to Galaxy Game

The gameplay of Galaxy Game, like Spacewar!, involves two monochrome spaceships called "the needle" and "the wedge" (though their appearances have been modified for the coin-op version) each controlled by a player, attempting to shoot each other while maneuvering on a two-dimensional plane in the gravity well of a star, set against the backdrop of a starfield. The ships fire torpedoes, which are not affected by the gravitational pull of the star. The ships have a limited number of torpedoes and a limited supply of fuel, which is used when the player fires his thrusters. Torpedoes are fired one at a time, and there is a cooldown period between launches. The ships follow Newtonian physics, remaining in motion even when the player is not accelerating, though the ships can rotate at a constant rate without inertia.

Each player controls one of the ships and must attempt to shoot down the other ship while avoiding a collision with the star. Flying near the star can provide a gravity assist to the player at the risk of misjudging the trajectory and falling into the star. If a ship moves past one edge of the screen, it reappears on the other side in a wraparound effect. A hyperspace feature, or "panic button", can be used as a last-ditch means to evade enemy torpedoes by moving the player's ship to another location on the screen after disappearing for a few seconds, but the reentry from hyperspace occurs at a random location, and there is an increasing probability of the ship exploding with each use. Player controls include clockwise and counterclockwise rotation, forward thrust, firing torpedoes, and hyperspace. Galaxy Game features, as improvements over the original, optional modifications to the game to have faster ships, faster torpedoes, to remove the star and its gravitational field or reverse the gravity to push away from the star, and to remove the wraparound effect. The movement of the ships was controlled with a joystick, while the torpedoes, hyperspace, and game options are controlled via a panel of buttons.

== Development ==
After deciding to begin work on a coin-operated version of Spacewar, the pair, with assistance from Tuck's family, bought a PDP-11 and started working on a prototype. They spent a total of US$20,000 (equivalent to about $159,000 in 2025) to build a single arcade machine for two players, like the original Spacewar, deciding to price the game at ten cents per play or 25 cents for three games, with the winner of a match given a free game. They used a PDP-11/20 version of the PDP-11 (US$14,000), a Hewlett-Packard 1300A Electrostatic Display (US$3,000), and spent the remainder on the coin acceptors, joysticks, wiring, and casing. Pitts build the computer hardware and handled the programming, while Tuck, a mechanical engineer, designed the enclosing cabinet. The display adapter for the monitor was built by Ted Panofsky, the coin acceptors were sourced from jukebox manufacturer Rowe International, and the joysticks found at a military surplus store as remainders from B-52 bomber controls. The code for the game was based on a version of Spacewar running on a PDP-10 in the Stanford artificial intelligence lab, but modified with additional features.

Pitts and Tuck renamed their product from Spacewar to Galaxy Game due to anti-war sentiment and founded a company called Mini-Computer Applications in June 1971 to operate the game as it neared completion. The development of the prototype machine took around three and a half months. By August, they were well into development and had gotten permission to place the machine at the Tresidder student union building at Stanford as a test site. It was then that they received a call from Nolan Bushnell, who had heard of their project and wanted to show them his similar project he was working on.

Bushnell had also played Spacewar during the 1960s and wanted to make an arcade game version of it, but had gone in a different technological direction. He and Ted Dabney had initially started with a US$4,000 Data General Nova computer which they thought would be powerful enough to run multiple simultaneous games of Spacewar; when it turned out to not be, they had started investigating replacing the computer hardware with custom-built parts. They had soon discovered that while a general-purpose computer cheap enough for an arcade game would not be powerful enough to run enough games of Spacewar to be profitable, a computer purpose-built for solely running one game could be made for as low as US$100. By August 1971 when Bushnell called Tuck and Pitts, he and Dabney had already displayed a prototype of their Computer Space game in a bar near Stanford and had found a commercial manufacturer for the game in Nutting Associates. They were curious about what Tuck and Pitts had done to make a commercially competitive version of the game, but were relieved, though also somewhat disappointed, to find that they had not solved that problem yet.

Tuck and Pitts, on the other hand, while impressed with Bushnell's hardware were not impressed with the game itself. They felt that Computer Space, a single-player game without the central gravity well of the original game, was a pale imitation of Spacewar, while their own Galaxy Game was a superior adaptation of the game. In November 1971, the Galaxy Game prototype debuted. The veneered walnut console, complete with seats for players, was located on the second floor of the building and connected to the PDP-11 in the attic by a 100-foot cable. In December, it was moved to a coffee shop on the first floor. It was very successful; Pitts later said that the machine attracted crowds of people "ten-deep" watching the players. They briefly attached a second monitor hanging above the console so that the watchers could more easily see the game. The low prices meant that they did not come close to making back the price of the PDP-11, but they were excited by the game's reception and had not intended the prototype to be profitable. As the initial Galaxy Game prototype was displayed to the public a few months after the first Computer Space prototype, it is believed to be the second video game to charge money to play.

As a result of the reception to Galaxy Game, Pitts and Tuck started work on an expanded prototype. For the second machine, they built a full blue fiberglass casing for the consoles, improved the quality of the joysticks with the help of a machine shop, and modified the computer with a newer display processor to support up to four games at once on different monitors—either multiple simultaneous separate games or up to four players playing the same game on two screens. They also placed the PDP-11 inside one of the consoles rather than in a separate location. While the original plan had been to work on driving down the development costs after the initial prototype, the popularity of the game convinced the pair to instead focus on making a better machine that could run multiple games to recoup the upfront investment. The new version was installed in a cafe in the student union building in June 1972, though with only two monitors due to space restrictions. The original Galaxy Game prototype was displayed at several locations around the area, but was not as successful as it had been at the student union building. By the time the second prototype was completed the pair had spent US$65,000 on the project and had no feasible way of making up the cost with the machine or commercial prospects for a wider release. Pitts later explained that he and Tuck had been focused on the engineering and technical challenges of producing a faithful coin-operated Spacewar game and paid little attention to the business side of the project; he felt that Computer Space had been more commercially successful because Bushnell had focused more on the business side of his idea than the technical.

== Legacy ==
The second Galaxy Game prototype remained on display in the Tresidder building until May 1979, when it was removed due to the display processor becoming unreliable. Throughout its time on display, it remained popular, with "ten to twenty people gathered around the machines most Friday and Saturday nights when school was in session." Pitts later claimed that by the time the machine was removed, it had managed to make back the original investment. After its removal, the machine was dismantled, with the computer parts stored in an office and the casing outdoors. The unit was restored in 1997 with a recreated display processor and put on display for several years in the computer science department at Stanford with two consoles attached for free use by students. Due to issues with space and maintenance, in 2000 it was moved into the Computer History Museum in Mountain View, California, in the displayed storage section. In August 2010, the museum loaned the console to Google to be placed at their headquarters campus at the request of Pitts—who wanted the game to be played as well as displayed—due to a discussion with senior vice president Jonathan Rosenberg, who had been hired as a 13 year old by Tuck and Pitts in the mid-1970s to keep the machine cleaned. It has since returned to the museum as a playable exhibit.
