= Inter Electrónica S.A. =

Spanish consumer electronics manufacturer

Inter
- Native name: Inter Electrónica, S.A.
- Formerly: Internacional Radio Televisión, S.A.
- Industry: Consumer electronics
- Founded: 15 December 1948
- Headquarters: Barcelona, Spain
- Products: Radios, record players, tape recorders, televisions, Overkal console
- Parent: Grundig (from 1978)

Inter Electrónica, S.A. (formerly Internacional Radio Televisión, S.A.) was a Spanish consumer electronics maker based in Barcelona. In 1978 the company was acquired by Grundig, and the Inter brand was phased out in Spain during the early 1980s.

== History ==
Founded in Barcelona on 15 December 1948, Inter manufactured radios, record players, tape recorders and televisions, and operated a national service network.

In 1978 the company was acquired by Grundig. Since then its products were marketed as Inter-Grundig before the brand was retired in favor of Grundig.

== Overkal ==
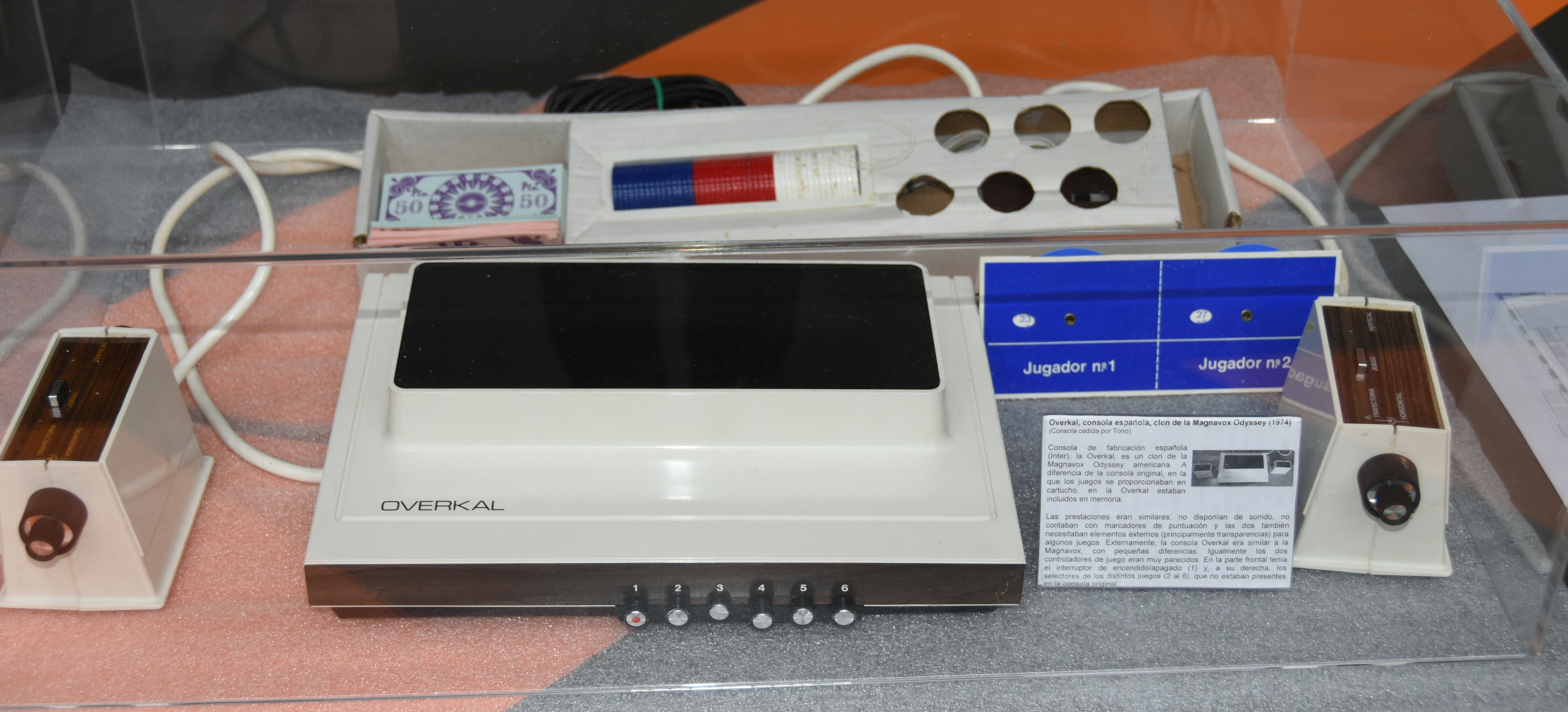
Overkal video game console

Inter's Overkal has been characterized by researchers and the specialist press as the first European video game console and an early clone of the Magnavox Odyssey.
