= Computer Space =

1971 video game

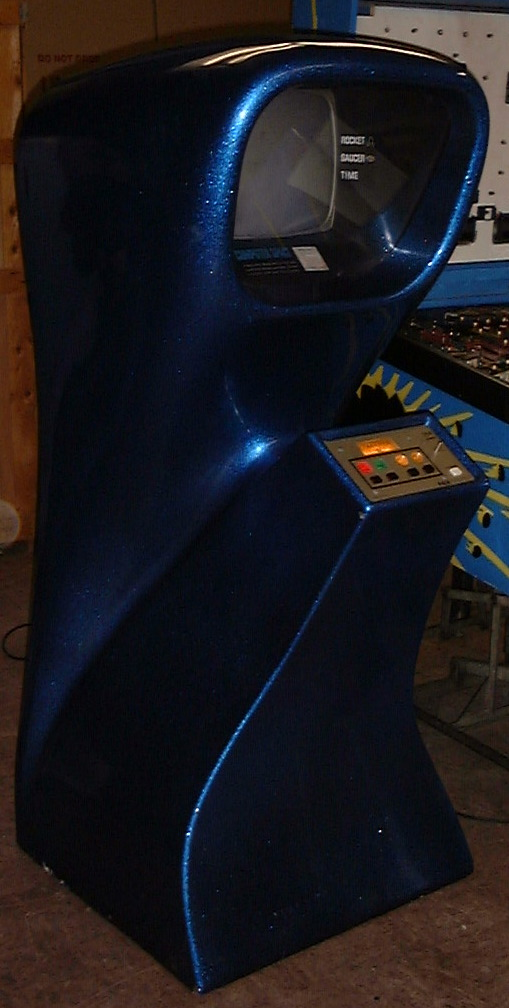
- Single-player cabinet
- Developer: Syzygy Engineering
- Publisher: Nutting Associates
- Designers: Nolan Bushnell; Ted Dabney
- Platform: Arcade
- Release: NA: November/December 1971
- Genre: Space combat simulation
- Modes: Single player, multiplayer

Computer Space is a 1971 space combat arcade video game. Created by Nolan Bushnell and Ted Dabney in partnership as Syzygy Engineering, it was the first arcade video game as well as the first commercially available video game. Computer Space is a derivative of the 1962 computer game Spacewar!, which is possibly the first video game to spread to multiple computer installations. It features a rocket controlled by the player engaged in a missile battle with a pair of hardware-controlled flying saucers set against a starfield background. The goal is to score more hits than the enemy spaceships within a set time period, which awards a free round of gameplay. The game is enclosed in a custom fiberglass cabinet, which Bushnell designed to look futuristic.

Bushnell and Dabney designed the game in 1970–71 to be a coin-operated version of Spacewar!. After the pair were unable to find a way to economically run the game on a minicomputer such as the Data General Nova, they hit upon the idea of instead replacing the central computer with custom-designed hardware created to run just that game. While they were working on an early proof of concept, Bushnell found a manufacturer for the game in Nutting Associates. Working in partnership with Nutting, the pair completed the game and ran their first location test in August 1971, a few months prior to the display of a similar prototype called Galaxy Game, also based on Spacewar!. It was first shown to industry press and distributors at the annual Music Operators of America (MOA) Expo in October. With encouraging initial interest, though mixed responses from distributors, Nutting ordered an initial production run of 1,500 units, anticipating a hit game.

While the game was successful and validated Syzygy's belief in the future of arcade video games, selling over 1,000 cabinets by mid-1972 and ultimately 1,300–1,500 units, it was not the runaway success that Nutting had hoped for. The game spawned one clone game, Star Trek (1972), and Nutting produced a two-player version of Computer Space in 1973 without involvement from Bushnell and Dabney. The pair left Nutting in June 1972 and incorporated Syzygy as Atari, launching the successful Pong (1972) as their next arcade game. Computer Space's release marked the ending of the early history of video games and the start of the commercial video game industry.

== Background ==
At the beginning of the 1970s, video games existed almost entirely as novelties passed around by programmers and technicians with access to computers, primarily at research institutions and large companies. One of these games was Spacewar!, created in 1962 for the Digital Equipment Corporation (DEC) PDP-1 by Steve Russell and others in the programming community at the Massachusetts Institute of Technology. This two-player game has the players engage in a dogfight between two spaceships while maneuvering on a two-dimensional plane in the gravity well of a star, set against the backdrop of a starfield. The game was copied to several of the early computer installations in American academic institutions after its initial release, making it probably the first video game to be available outside a single research institute.

Spacewar! was extremely popular in the small programming community in the 1960s and was widely recreated on other minicomputer and mainframe computers of the time, later migrating to early microcomputer systems. Early computer scientist Alan Kay noted in 1972 that "the game of Spacewar! blossoms spontaneously wherever there is a graphics display connected to a computer," and contributor Martin Graetz recalled in 1981 that as the game initially spread it could be found on "just about any research computer that had a programmable CRT". Although the game was widespread for the era, it was still very limited in its direct reach: the PDP-1 was priced at US$120,000 (equivalent to about $1,277,000 in 2025) and only 53 were ever sold, most without a monitor, which prohibited the original Spacewar! or any game of the time from reaching beyond a narrow, academic audience. The original developers of Spacewar! considered ways to monetize the game, but saw no options given the high price of the computer on which it ran. Computer Space, which would not be released until 1971, was the first commercial video game based on Spacewar!.

== Gameplay ==
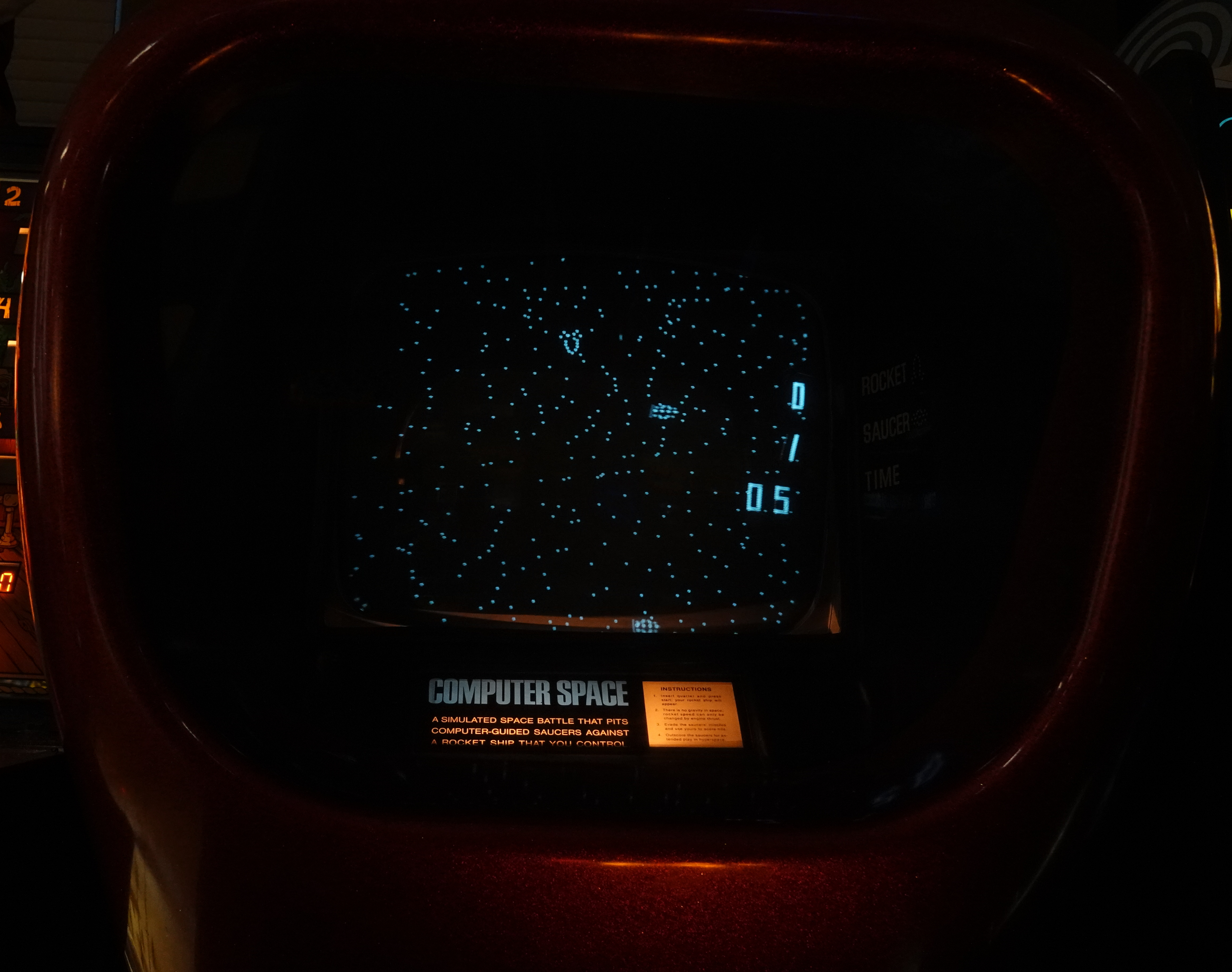
Single-player Computer Space gameplay; the player's rocket is near the top-center, with two flying saucers marked by groups of closely clustered dots. On the right side is the player score, computer score, and time remaining.

In Computer Space, the player controls a rocket as it attempts to shoot a pair of flying saucers while avoiding their fire. The game has the three ships flying on a two-dimensional plane set against the backdrop of a starfield. Missiles are fired one at a time, and there is a cooldown period between launches. The player's rocket remains in motion even when the player is not accelerating, and rotating the ship does not change the direction of its motion, though it can rotate at a constant rate. The flying saucers stay in place or glide in a zig-zag pattern around the screen in tandem, with one staying a constant distance directly below the other. If a ship or missile moves past one edge of the screen, it reappears on the other side in a wraparound effect. While the missile is in flight, the player can turn it left or right by turning their rocket.

Player controls are clockwise and counterclockwise rotation, forward thrust, and firing missiles. Whenever the player is hit by a missile or flying saucer, the screen flashes and the player's rocket spins rapidly and disappears before reappearing in the same location. If a flying saucer is hit by a missile, the screen flashes, and the saucer briefly disappears. Counters on the right side of the screen track the number of times both the player's rocket and the saucers have been destroyed, as well as how long that round of gameplay has lasted. A round has a time limit—adjustable by the operator—of 60 to 150 seconds, with a default of 90; when the time limit is reached, the game ends if the player's score is lower than the computer's. If it is higher, the black and white colors invert in a "hyperspace" feature, and another round begins for free; the game continues on to new rounds with the display colors inverting indefinitely if the player continues to win. One round costs a quarter, or two quarters if the machine is adjusted against the instruction manual's recommendations for optimal pricing. The game displays distorted characters if the player or computer scores pass 9, and each score independently resets to 0 for both visual and gameplay purposes if it reaches 9 for the computer or 16 for the player.

In the two-player version of the game, a second game mode is added featuring two player-controlled rockets fighting each other instead of computer-controlled ships. The modified control panel contains two sets of controls, with joysticks replacing the movement buttons on some machines.

== Development ==
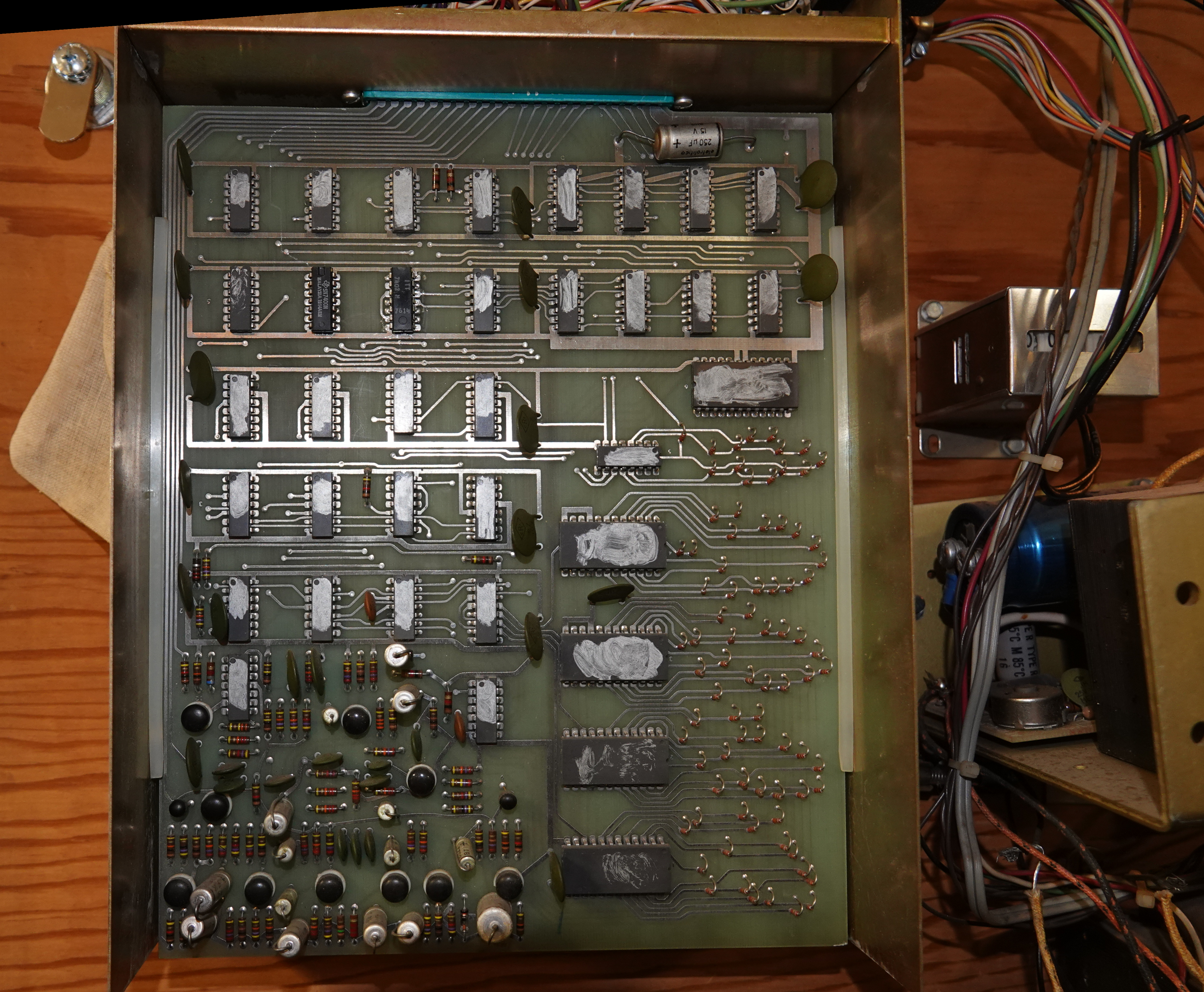
"Memory board" of Computer Space. Made of discrete logic chips. Diodes at the bottom-right define the graphics of the flying saucer and 4 angles of the player's ship. Two other circuit boards behind the memory board comprise the game logic. The chip markings are obscured, which was not true of all units.

While studying at the University of Utah, electrical engineering student Nolan Bushnell had a part-time job at an amusement arcade, where he became familiar with arcade electro-mechanical games such as Chicago Coin's racing game Speedway (1969), watching customers play and helping to maintain the machinery, while learning how it worked and developing his understanding of how the game business operates. In 1969, after graduating from college, Bushnell worked as an engineer in California for Ampex, an electronics company that worked in audio and video recording technology.

While at a club for playing the board game Go, Bushnell met researcher Jim Stein, who worked for Stanford University's Artificial Intelligence Project; Bushnell learned from him that Spacewar! was running on the laboratory's PDP-6, and played the game against him there when visiting. (Note: Bushnell has claimed to have first seen Spacewar! while a student at the University of Utah on a mainframe computer—the specific one is not consistent between stories—but he graduated in December 1968, and no computer capable of running it was available at that university to anyone besides university researchers before 1969; multiple contemporaries have stated that they never knew of Spacewar! running on any computer there at the time. Ted Dabney has claimed that Bushnell did not see Spacewar! until 1969 at Stanford, and possibly as late as 1970.) Bushnell had previously worked during the summer at Lagoon Amusement Park in Utah as a manager of the games department overseeing the arcade games, and when he saw Spacewar! he believed that an arcade game version of the game would be very popular. The high price of computers capable of running the game, however, meant that any such arcade game would not be economically feasible. In the spring of 1970, however, he saw an ad for the Data General Nova computer, which cost only US$4,000 (equivalent to about $33,000 in 2025), and thought again about his Spacewar! arcade game idea. He believed that at that price the game would be economically viable if he were able to connect four monitors and coin slots to allow multiple games to run simultaneously. He showed his office mate and fellow Ampex engineer Ted Dabney Spacewar! at the Stanford laboratory, and the two agreed to work together to try and design a prototype of the game. Bushnell had some experience with computers and digital engineering but not enough to create the game on his own, while the older Dabney was more experienced with analog and hardware engineering, as he had designed video processing and control circuits and power supplies.

After agreeing on an initial idea, Bushnell and Dabney began designing a prototype based on a Nova. Over the summer they made plans for developing the game, and in the early fall they were joined by Larry Bryan, a computer programmer who also worked at Ampex. Bushnell and Dabney put US$100 each into a partnership, named Syzygy by Bryan, in order to purchase components. They soon ran into difficulties with their planned design: the computer was not powerful enough to run multiple simultaneous games and refresh the monitors as fast as was needed to make the games playable. Bryan realized this soon after starting work on the project in August 1970 while trying to design the code needed to run the games, and he left the project before Syzygy was officially formed without ever contributing any money. Bushnell and Dabney continued working on the design for several more months.

The pair attempted to reduce the load on the computer by replacing subroutines—such as displaying the background stars—with specialized hardware, but it proved insufficient; even reducing the number of monitors was not enough. By the end of November 1970, Bushnell decided to abandon the project as untenable; Dabney had stopped working on the design a while before. It is unclear if the pair were aware that Data General had demonstrated a more powerful variant of the Nova, sold for US$8,000, running a single game of Spacewar! at the Fall Joint Computer Conference in December 1968, though that solution would have been too expensive for an arcade game, which typically cost US$1,000 at the time. Unable to put the game idea out of his mind, however, Bushnell soon thought of a way to manipulate the video signal on the screen with hardware without a computer having to control it, and from there the pair came up with the idea of building hardware components to handle parts of the game on behalf of the computer.

Bushnell and Dabney began to design custom hardware to run the game's functions, and in January 1971 they had a dot moving on a screen. Bushnell drafted a letter dated January 26 to order six Nova computers. He did not send the letter, however; near the end of January, he tried to run their program on a local Nova, and found that they had miscalculated the requirements. Even with several of the functions removed from the program, now named Cosmic Combat, the computer still could not run multiple instances at once. Although upset, Bushnell soon realized that it would be possible to entirely replace the Nova with custom hardware, and that the cost to build the whole game's computing systems would be much lower. As a result, they would not need to have multiple instances of the game running on the same machine in order to be profitable. On the other hand, the custom hardware was not as powerful as the more expensive Nova computer, which meant that the pair needed to make gameplay modifications. Spacewar! was a two-player game featuring dogfights around the gravitational field of a central star; neither of these features could be run on the dedicated circuits the pair were making, so the game was cut down to a single-player game wherein the player would fight against two computer-controlled spaceships in open space. (Note: It is unclear to what extent each of the pair were responsible for the early hardware for the game, as both Dabney and Bushnell claim credit for much of it and contradict each other in interviews. They both agree that the idea for a hardware-based video modulator was Bushnell's, but Dabney claims that he then designed and constructed it along with many of the other components in his daughter's bedroom-turned-office as a stand-alone project, while Bushnell claims that he did the majority of the design and digital engineering work on the hardware—in early stories in his daughter's bedroom-turned-office, which he later retracted. Dabney also claims that Bushnell was relatively inexperienced as an engineer and had to be taught many concepts to help with development. Some of the construction of the prototype components was done in early 1971 by Steve Bristow, an intern at Ampex.)

In January 1971, Bushnell and Dabney founded Syzygy Engineering as an official company, now with a cash amount of US$350 each. They approached Ampex and a prior manager of Dabney's with their prototype, but found no interest. The major arcade game manufacturers were based out of Chicago at the time, limiting their ability to demonstrate their idea to an existing firm. During a dentist appointment in early 1971, Bushnell told the dentist about the game and that he was looking for a manufacturer; the dentist in turn referred him to another patient of his, Dave Ralstin, the sales manager for Nutting Associates in Mountain View, California. Nutting had been founded in 1966 on the basis of Computer Quiz, an analog quiz arcade game, and by 1971 was looking for another hit game. After meeting with Bushnell, Nutting felt that his game was the potential success it needed to replace falling sales of Computer Quiz updates, as quiz games were growing less popular and it did not have an engineering team that could design successful new games.

Nutting not only agreed to manufacture the game but also hired Bushnell as their chief engineer. Furthermore, Syzygy Engineering retained ownership of the game, even though Nutting agreed to give Syzygy space to build the prototype and to manufacture the game once complete. Syzygy would be paid five percent of each cabinet sold. Bushnell negotiated to work on Cosmic Combat outside of normal working hours until it went into production in order to keep it conceptually separate from his new job at Nutting, so as to prevent Nutting from later claiming ownership due to paying for time or materials spent building the game. Dabney remained at Ampex until the summer, when he resigned to join Bushnell at Nutting, as he was initially unwilling to leave the stable job he had worked at for ten years without more proof that the game could be a success.

== Location tests and release ==
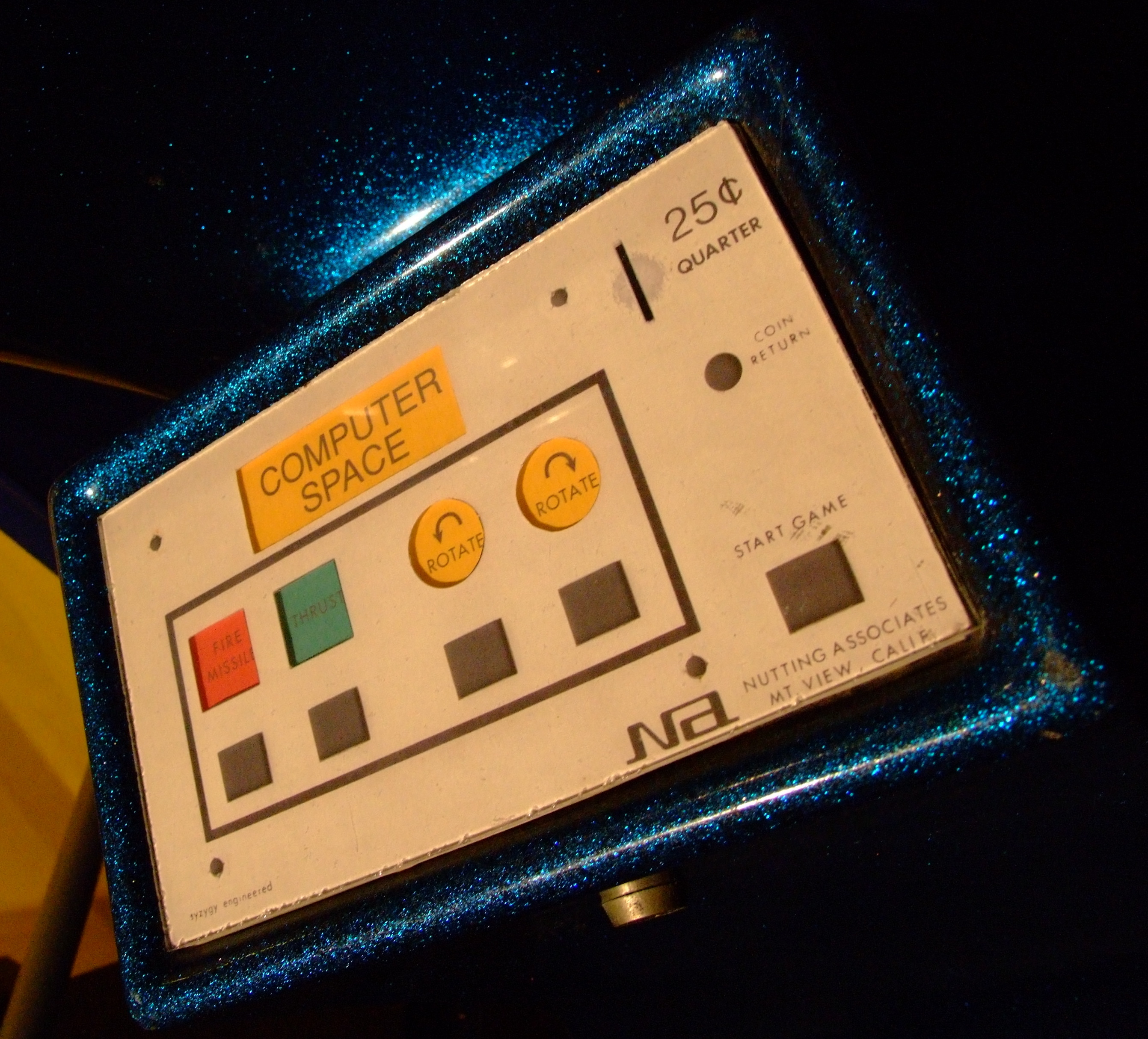
Computer Space control panel

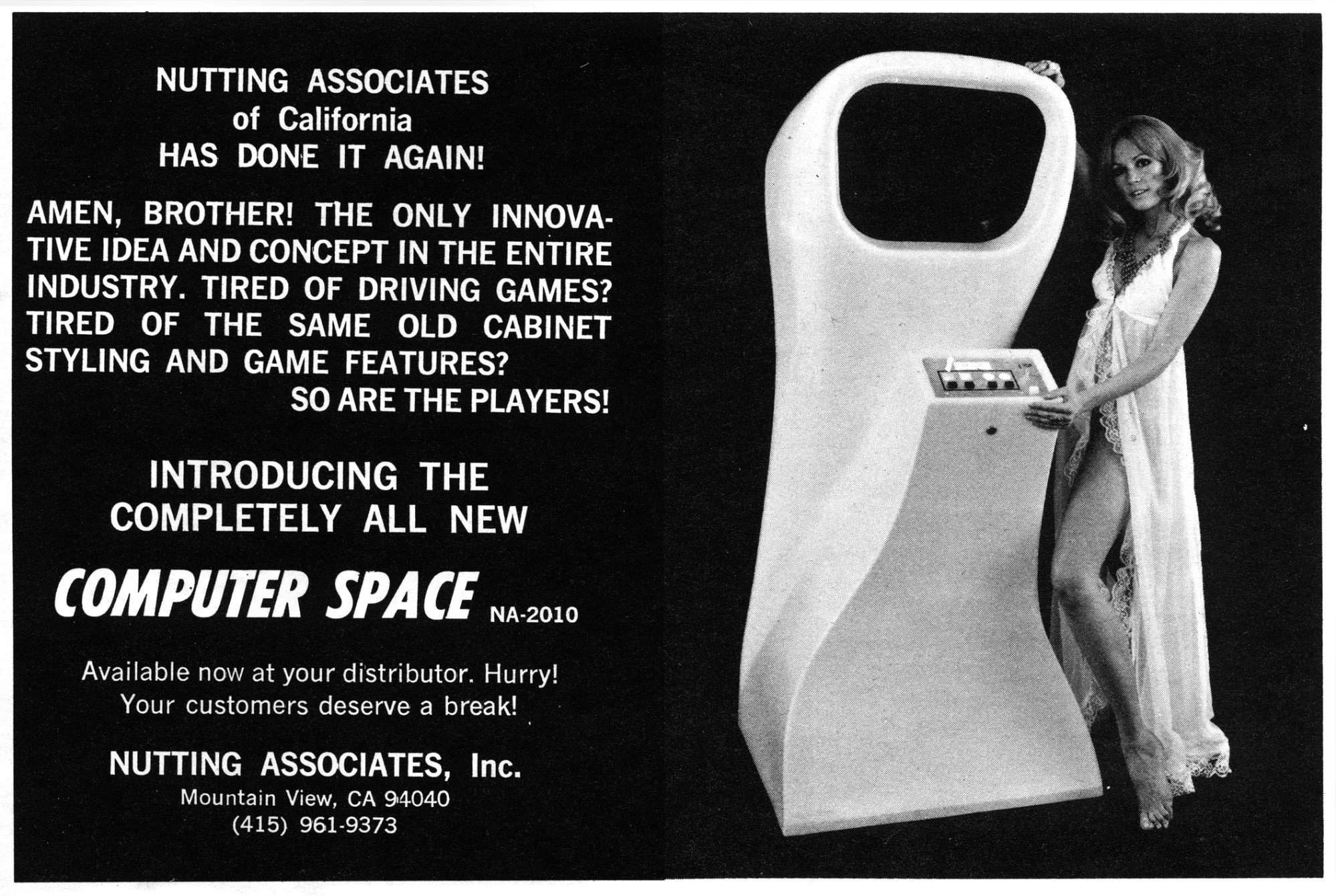
Advertisement from the magazine Cash Box, 1971

Once he moved to Nutting, Bushnell took over the majority of the engineering work for the game; Dabney has stated that he advised Bushnell on some of the design. After Dabney joined Bushnell at Nutting, he helped with the creation of the cabinet itself, including the coin slot, control panel, and power supply, and designed a sound system that could make a noise like a rocket engine. By August 1971, an initial prototype of the game—now named Computer Space to be similar to Computer Quiz—was complete, and Syzygy moved on to location testing. They installed the game at the Dutch Goose bar in Menlo Park, California, near Stanford University, where it met with great success. Nutting was heartened by the response and rushed to make several finished cabinets for the Music Operators of America (MOA) Music & Amusement Machines Exposition in October. Further location tests found a less enthusiastic response from customers confused by the game mechanics and controls, and Syzygy hurriedly adjusted the game's instructions to try to be more understandable to players. (Note: Some sources claim Syzygy made adjustments to the game as well to alleviate player confusion, but it is unclear what they may have changed, if anything. An attempt was made to use a metal joystick as a control instead of buttons, but it broke after a single night at a location test and was not used in production models. It is not clear what specific problems were found in playtests as opposed to after the game's release, though it is likely that the issues Bushnell and other sources report with players who had never seen a video game before not finding the game very easy to understand were present then as well.)

The final Computer Space design uses no microprocessor; the entire computer system is a state machine made of 7400-series integrated circuits, with monochrome graphic elements held in diode arrays. The arrays, which Bushnell designed to let him rotate the rocket in 32 directions with only 4 arrays, are laid out in the shape of the ships, to make it obvious to game operators what would need to be replaced if something broke. These arrays reduced the amount of work that the game had to perform to update the screen: instead of refreshing the entire screen for any change, like Spacewar!, each element could be moved independently of the others. The ships themselves are drawn on the screen as a pattern of dots, rather than connected lines, and were essentially hardwired bitmaps and are considered an early form of the concept of sprite graphics. The cabinet includes a General Electric 15-inch black and white television screen as the monitor, specially modified for the game. In the rudimentary algorithm constructed by Bushnell, the enemy ships fire towards the quadrant of the screen that the player's rocket is in, rather than directly at the player's rocket.

As Syzygy and Nutting prepared for the MOA show, Bushnell learned that another pair of engineers, Bill Pitts and Hugh Tuck, were also creating an arcade version of Spacewar!. In August 1971 Bushnell called Pitts and Tuck, who were operating as Mini-Computer Applications, so that they could meet and discuss their solutions to the problem of running Spacewar! on an inexpensive computer. Pitts and Tuck were developing a prototype machine of Galaxy Game when they met with Bushnell; the game, however, while a faithful recreation of Spacewar!, ran on an externally connected DEC PDP-11 with a Hewlett-Packard 1300A Electrostatic Display, and the total cost of the prototype unit was US$20,000 (equivalent to about $159,000 in 2025). The Syzygy duo were relieved, though also somewhat disappointed, to find that Galaxy Game was not using an innovative solution Syzygy had missed to build an economically-competitive arcade game. Pitts and Tuck, conversely, felt that Computer Space was a pale imitation of Spacewar!, while Galaxy Game was a superior adaptation of the game. They eventually produced two game prototypes, both displayed in the Stanford student union building, but never produced the game commercially due to the high cost of the cabinet.

Computer Space debuted at the MOA show on October 15–17, 1971. Dabney's wooden cabinet for the initial prototype was replaced with a curvy, futuristic fiberglass cabinet designed by Bushnell with modelling clay and built by a swimming pool manufacturer. A control panel extended from the main body of the cabinet and contained the four control buttons; Syzygy had hoped to use a joystick to control the rocket's movement, but found that it broke too easily, failing to last a single night in a location test. The Galaxy Game designers had run into the same issue, but had solved it with expensive customized military surplus joysticks. The cabinet displayed the Nutting Associates name and logo, along with the term "Syzygy engineered".

Nutting displayed four cabinets at the MOA show, one each in red, blue, white, and yellow, with the implication that the game was already in production, though they were in fact the only four cabinets then produced. These initial cabinets were in solid colors, though later ones would use a sparkle finish. The cabinets were damaged during transport, and one monitor was broken; Syzygy repaired the three working cabinets and opened up the fourth to demonstrate the internals to attendees. The game was popular with viewers, with a crowded display area, and trade magazine Cash Box called it "very promising" and "very glamorous". Game distributors, however, were hesitant about the game, with concerns raised about the game's potential, reliability, and the embedded monitor's attractiveness to thieves; recollections are mixed as to whether Nutting took a handful of orders or none at the show. Nutting ordered a large production run regardless, on the expectation that the distributors would come around with further exposure. The game entered initial production sometime in November or December, and began full production around the end of January 1972.

== Reception and legacy ==
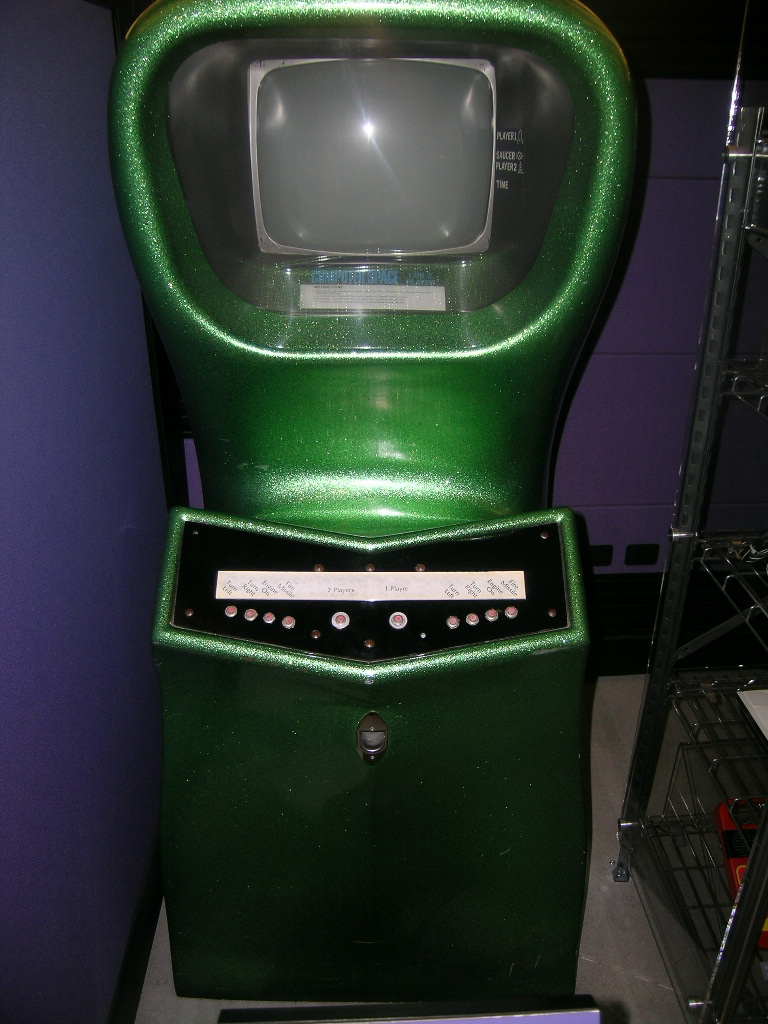
2-player Computer Space cabinet in 2006, with buttons instead of joysticks

Nutting ordered an initial production run of 1,500 units of Computer Space, an optimistic decision given that a hit arcade game at the time would sell around 2,000 units, though a handful had reached 10,000. Reception to the game from distributors was mixed. While some were excited by the game, others felt it confusing and would amount to nothing more than a passing fad at best. By spring 1972 the game had sold over 1,000 units, and according to Bushnell in 1976 ended up selling between 1,300 and 1,500 units. While this was a commercial success, making over US$1,000,000 (equivalent to about $7,697,000 in 2025), it was a disappointment to Nutting, which had been hoping for a large-scale success like Computer Quiz.

The game's relative lack of success was attributed to the complexity of its controls and a steep learning curve, which pushed away customers used to less complex games. Bushnell noted that the locations in which the game did well, like the Dutch Goose playtest location, were generally located near university campuses; the general market for coin-operated games, however, was in working-class bars, where the patrons were less interested in deciphering a complicated game. In the documentary Video Game Invasion: The History of a Global Obsession, Bushnell explained, "Sure, I loved it, and all my friends loved it, but all my friends were engineers. It was a little too complicated for the guy with the beer in the bar." Bushnell has also stated that part of the difficulty lay in the novelty of the game; he said that even a few years later the controls and gameplay would have been more understandable to players who would have seen other video games by then. Conversely, Bushnell and Dabney have said that the game's novelty was also part of its appeal to players—most people had never seen a television screen displaying images being controlled by a person in front of it, rather than displaying a broadcast from a remote television station.

While the game did not meet the high hopes of Nutting, it was successful enough that Nutting produced a two-player version of the game in July 1973 built by Steve Bristow with a green fiberglass cabinet; the design was initially contracted to Bushnell, but his design was either uncompleted or unused. Bushnell and Dabney did not work further on the game, and it was not a large success. Although the biggest successes in arcade games at the time generally spawned a dozen copycat games, only a single Computer Space clone is known, produced in 1972 by For-Play Manufacturers as Star Trek. A custom white Computer Space cabinet appeared in the 1973 film Soylent Green as a futuristic entertainment device, marking the first appearance of a video game in a movie.

In June 1972, Bushnell and Dabney quit Nutting Associates after Bushnell was unable to convince Nutting to give him a 33 percent stake in the company, and moved to incorporate Syzygy Engineering; they instead named it Atari due to another company with a similar name. Bushnell later stated that he was encouraged by the success of Computer Space in regards to future game ideas, as he had never before created something that made so much money, and additionally felt that his time at Nutting gave him confidence in running his own company because he "couldn't screw it up more than they did". Nutting Associates did not make any further Computer Space games before closing in 1976. Bushnell's enthusiasm was soon vindicated, as Atari's first game, Pong, went on to substantially greater success than Computer Space.

Although not as influential as Pong, as the first arcade video game, Computer Space had a strong influence on future video game design, such as using terms and designs from prior mechanical arcade games, and providing a template for transforming a medium previously designed and played on research mainframes into a commercial model for general consumers. It directly inspired several video games and game designers, such as Steve Bristow, who came up with the idea for Tank (1974) to correct the perceived shortcomings of the game by having easier-to-control tanks instead, and Jerry Lawson, the designer of the Fairchild Channel F home console (1976). It also influenced Larry Rosenthal, who was partially inspired to make the vector graphics-based Space Wars (1977) by his dislike of Computer Space's simplification of Spacewar!, and Ed Logg, who combined the controls and movement of the game with elements of Space Invaders (1978) to make Asteroids (1979). Computer Space's release marked the ending of the early history of video games and the start of the commercial video game industry.

== Sources ==
- DeMaria, Rusel; Wilson, Johnny L. (December 2003). High Score!: The Illustrated History of Electronic Games (2nd ed.). McGraw Hill/Osborne. ISBN 978-0-07-223172-4.
- Donovan, Tristan (April 20, 2010). Replay: The History of Video Games. Yellow Ant. ISBN 978-0-9565072-0-4.
- Goldberg, Marty; Vendel, Curt (November 25, 2012). Atari Inc.: Business Is Fun. Syzygy Press. ISBN 978-0-9855974-0-5.
- Kent, Steven L. (September 6, 2001). The Ultimate History of Video Games. Three Rivers Press. ISBN 978-0-7615-3643-7.
- Rutter, Jason; Bryce, Jo (May 9, 2006). Understanding Digital Games. SAGE Publications. ISBN 978-1-4129-0034-8.
- Smith, Alexander (November 27, 2019). They Create Worlds: The Story of the People and Companies That Shaped the Video Game Industry. Vol. 1: 1971 – 1982. CRC Press. ISBN 978-1-138-38990-8.
- Wilson, Jason (May 12, 2015). Swalwell, Melanie; Wilson, Jason (eds.). The Pleasures of Computer Gaming: Essays on Cultural History, Theory and Aesthetics. McFarland & Company. ISBN 978-0-7864-5120-3.
- Wolf, Mark J. P. (August 16, 2012). Encyclopedia of Video Games. Vol. 1: A-L. Greenwood Press. ISBN 978-1-78539-484-3.
