= Ted Dabney =

Co-founder of Atari Inc. (1937–2018)

- Ted Dabney (left) in 1972 with a Pong arcade cabinet and fellow Atari employees Nolan Bushnell, Fred Marincic and Allan Alcorn
- Born: Samuel Frederick Dabney Jr. May 2, 1937; San Francisco, California, U.S.
- Died: May 26, 2018 (aged 81); Clearlake, California, U.S.
- Occupation: Electrical engineer
- Known for: Co-founder of Atari, Inc., co-creator of Computer Space
- Spouse: Carolyn Dabney

Samuel Frederick "Ted" Dabney Jr. (May 2, 1937 – May 26, 2018) was an American electrical engineer, and the co-founder, alongside Nolan Bushnell, of Atari, Inc. He is recognized as developing the basics of video circuitry principles that were used for Computer Space and later Pong, one of the first and most successful arcade games.

== Education and early career ==
Dabney was born in San Francisco, California, to Irma and Samuel Frederick Dabney. His parents divorced while he was young and he was subsequently raised by his father. One of several schools that he attended was John A. O'Connell High School of Technology, where he studied trade drafting, which led to him getting a job with the California Department of Transportation while still a teenager. He eventually got his high school diploma from San Mateo High School; Dabney credited a math teacher named Walker there who got him interested in the electronics and computing areas. He then had a summer position with a local surveyor company, but when the work dried up by the winter, he was let go, and he enlisted in the United States Marine Corps. During his three years in the Corps he took courses on electronics, giving him an interest in the area. He was able to leave the Corps as he had been admitted into San Francisco State University, but since he did not have the funds to support his education, he instead took a job with Bank of America based on his electronics experience, where he kept the Electronic Recording Machine, Accounting operational.

== Career in the computer industry ==
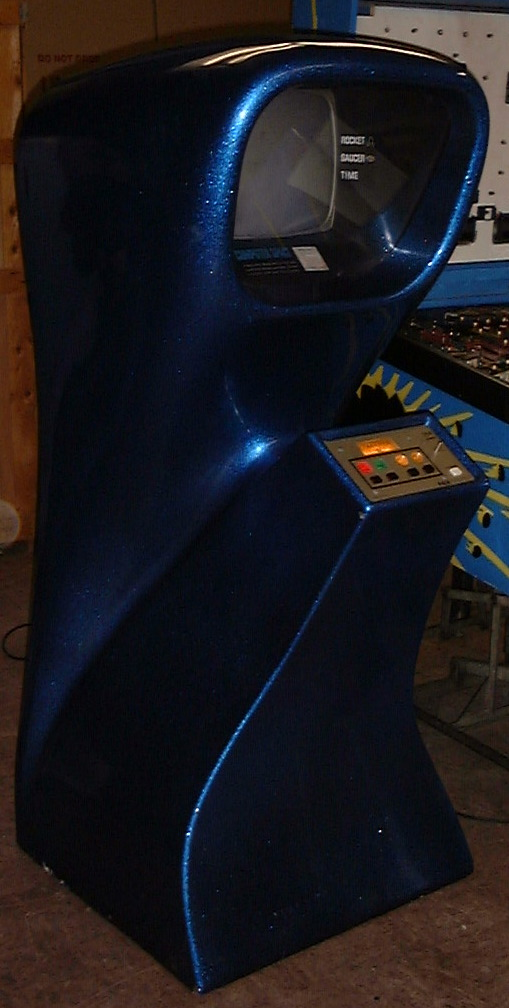
The Computer Space arcade game cabinet

Dabney left Bank of America after a year, and on recommendation of John Herbert, a colleague he worked with, was hired by Hewlett-Packard. Within a few weeks, Herbert had moved on to Ampex and convinced Dabney to interview there. Dabney joined Ampex in 1961, working in their military products section. This work led to him becoming involved in early video imagery products within Ampex, including vidicon systems. By around 1969 Ampex had also hired Nolan Bushnell, who worked alongside Dabney and where they became friends. Bushnell, prior to joining Ampex, had come up with the idea of making a carnival-like pizza place with animatronics and games, and discussed this idea with Dabney. After seeing a computer system at the Stanford Artificial Intelligence Laboratory, the two came up with the concept of using a smaller computer or video systems, adding coin slots, and allowing people to pay to play games on this.

Dabney and Bushnell jointly created a partnership called Syzygy (named after astronomy term representing an alignment of celestial bodies) in 1971. When they decided to incorporate, they discovered another company had that name and therefore established their corporation under the name Atari, Inc., based on the Go term equivalent to chess's "check", as both had been avid fans of the game. Their first product was Computer Space, inspired by having seen Spacewar! running at various computer laboratories. Dabney created a motion system using a video circuit made up of cheap analog and digital components of a standard television set rather than acquire an expensive computer, while Bushnell designed its cabinet and worked with Nutting Associates to manufacture the game at scale. Bushnell used this to convince Al Alcorn, another Ampex employee, to leave and join Atari to help program more of these games. Under Bushnell's direction, Alcorn used Dabney's video circuit concept to create the programming for Atari's next game, Pong. Dabney constructed the coin slot mechanism portion of the cabinet. Once their one-off version proved successful, they ramped up production for scale, with Dabney overseeing the manufacturing process. Pong became the first successful arcade video game.

As Pong became successful, Dabney felt overshadowed by both Bushnell and Alcorn. He learned that Bushnell had patented his video circuit idea without including Dabney on the patent. Bushnell also had assigned Dabney a lower-level position in Atari and did not include him in high-level meetings. Around March 1973, Dabney left the company over this falling out, selling his portion of the company's ownership for US$250,000. Dabney did continue to help Bushnell with starting his Pizza Time Theater (the predecessor of Chuck E. Cheese's) and Catalyst Technologies as an employee, being wary of Bushnell's previous treatment of him. Alongside these, he worked for several companies, including Raytheon and Fujitsu, and at other times working on his own projects for his own video game company Syzygy Game Company, where he made games that Bushnell used for his Pizza Time Theaters, including an arcade quiz game based on science fiction writer Isaac Asimov. Dabney also helped with the automated ticket number system used by the restaurants. When Pizza Time Theater went under, and Bushnell could not pay Dabney what he owed him, Dabney opted to close down Syzygy, and ended his friendship with Bushnell. Dabney went to work at Teledyne for about ten years before deciding to leave the industry.

== Later life and death ==
Dabney married twice. First with Joan Wahrmund, with whom he had two daughters, later with Carolyn, who he predeceased.

After leaving the computer industry, Ted and Carolyn Dabney managed a grocery store and later a deli in Crescent Mills, California. Around 2006, they moved from California to a property he owned near Okanogan National Forest in Washington. The Dabneys later returned to California, taking up residence in Clearlake, a city north of San Francisco.

After his departure from Atari, Dabney did not receive much publicity, and until 2009, his contributions towards Atari and the early days of video games were generally forgotten. Dabney reappeared in 2009, following an announcement made by Paramount Pictures the previous year that they were going to make a biographical film based on Nolan Bushnell, but had never approached Dabney for any input. Dabney gave an interview with video game historian Leonard Herman in Edge that described his contributions towards Atari, and acknowledged that "I'm sure [Bushnell] had no desire to even acknowledge that I ever existed" and "He wouldn't give me any credit even while I was still there". He was the subject of an oral history discussion with the Computer History Museum in July 2012.

The Dabneys lost their Lake County home in the August 2016 Clayton Fire, relocating to nearby Clearlake. A GoFundMe account was set up to help the Dabneys resettle, but it was cancelled after Dabney confirmed that he didn't need it. Dabney was diagnosed with esophageal cancer in late 2017, and opted against treatment after being told he had eight months to live.

In March 2018, members of the Smithsonian Institution interviewed Dabney for an oral history from his point of view, which ran for eight hours at his home in California.

He died on May 26, 2018, in his Clearlake home from complications from the cancer.
