= Nutting Associates =

American arcade game manufacturer

Company logo

Nutting Associates was an arcade game manufacturer based in Mountain View, California, incorporated in February 1967 by William Gilbert Nutting. In 1977 the company was purchased by William "Si" Redd and eventually absorbed into the company Sircoma.

== History ==
Bill Nutting was working as a buyer at a San Francisco department store when his father-in-law, Revere Ware executive Herbert Ullmann, alerted him to an educational technology company called Edex Teaching Systems looking for investors. Nutting became a partner in the company, which created a coin-operated trivia game called the Knowledge Computer in 1964. Nutting marketed the machine for Edex and bought the rights to it after Edex was purchased by Raytheon in 1965. In January 1966, he founded Nutting Associates to market the Knowledge Computer and a redesigned version of the device called Computer Quiz (1967) created by Richard Ball of Marketing Services. In 1968 the model was redesigned into a solid-state version.

In 1971, Nolan Bushnell sold Nutting Associates on manufacturing the game Computer Space (1971). About 1,500 units were manufactured. Afterwards, Bushnell wanted a large ownership stake in the company to continue creating games for Nutting Associates, but left after being given that opportunity to form Atari Inc. with Ted Dabney.

Nutting Associates continued manufacturing video games up until 1977 when the company was sold to "Si" Redd. A new Nutting Associates company was established in Nevada before being absorbed into the larger company Sircoma, a video poker manufacturer.

Nutting's brother, Dave Nutting, also worked in the video game industry. He formed Dave Nutting Associates, a consulting firm that produced many of Midway's games during the 1970s and early 1980s.
