= Atari Games Corp. v. Oman =

1992 court case regarding video game copyright law

- Court: United States Court of Appeals for the District of Columbia Circuit
- Full case name: Atari Games Corporation v Ralph OMAN, Register of Copyrights
- Citations: Atari Games Corp. v. Oman, 979 F. 2d. 242 (D.C. Cir. 1992).

Case history
- Appealed from: Atari Games Corp. v. Oman, 693 F. Supp. 1204 (D. D.C. 1988).

Case opinions
- Decision by: Judge Ruth Bader Ginsburg

Atari Games Corp. v. Oman was a series of court cases where Atari, a video game developer, challenged the United States Copyright Office for refusing copyright registration for their arcade game Breakout. The Register of Copyrights first rejected Atari's registration in 1987, determining that Breakout lacked sufficient creativity to qualify as an audiovisual work. Atari twice appealed the register's decision before their copyright was granted. Decided in 1992, the case affirmed that video games are protected from clone developers who mimic a game's audiovisual aspects.

Breakout was a single player ball-and-paddle game developed by Steve Jobs and Steve Wozniak in 1976, based on a design specifications from Atari founder Nolan Bushnell. Atari sought registration for the game a decade later, after several courts had established that copyright applied to video games. However, Register of Copyrights Ralph Oman determined that the game did not have enough creative authorship to qualify as a copyrightable work, since the images were simple geometric shapes, and the audiovisual display was the dynamic creation of code rather than a fixed work created by an author. The decision was appealed to the United States Court of Appeals for the District of Columbia Circuit, where Judge Ruth Bader Ginsburg indicated that the Register needed to consider the work as a whole and not just its individual elements. The Register denied the registration again, citing the lack of creativity in the abstract geometric shapes. On a second appeal, Judge Ginsberg concluded that there was sufficient creativity in the graphical representations of a wall, a ball, and a paddle, as they looked and behaved in a way that was not standard or obvious. The court established an "extremely low" level of creativity required for copyright, and Atari was finally granted their registration for Breakout.

The decision builds on early copyright cases that treat video games as an audiovisual work, including Atari v. Amusement World (1981), Atari v. North American Phillips (1982), Stern Electronics, Inc. v. Kaufman (1982), and Midway v. Artic (1983). The series of decisions became influential on the copyrightability of software more generally. Decades later, the United States Copyright Office has continued to cite Atari v Oman for the principle that an audiovisual work only requires a modicum of human creative authorship to be copyrightable. Several participants in the case later became notable figures in their own right: Jobs and Wozniak founded Apple Inc., Bushnell founded Chuck E. Cheese, and Judge Ginsberg was appointed to the United States Supreme Court.

== Background ==
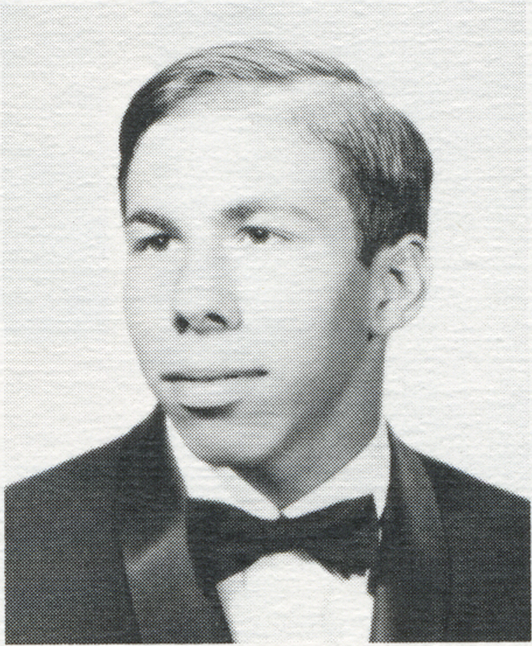
A young Steve Wozniak developed Breakout for Atari's growing arcade business.

In 1974, Steve Jobs was hired by Atari, a developer of arcade games. Atari co-founder Nolan Bushnell requested a single player arcade game based on Pong (1972), where the player uses a paddle to hit a ball towards bricks. Jobs recruited friend Steve Wozniak to assist with the project, developing the concept into Breakout (1976), after four days and four nights of hardware engineering. In the game, the player uses a rectangular paddle to hit a square bouncing ball against a wall of red, amber, green, and blue bricks. Wozniak worked to minimize the number of microchips while still meeting the design specifications from Atari. Soon after, Wozniak and Jobs left Atari to commercialize the Apple I personal computer, founding Apple Inc. on April 1, 1976.

On May 13, 1976, Breakout was launched in arcades. The game became a commercial success, becoming one of the top five highest-earning arcade games in America for 1976, 1977, and 1978. Breakout had a total arcade production run of 11,000 cabinets manufactured by Atari, estimated to have generated over $11 million ($62 million adjusted for inflation) in sales revenue. This success led to sequels such as Super Breakout and Breakout 2000, as well as adaptations to other game devices.

== Legal process ==
=== Copyright registration ===
By the early 1980s, courts had decided that video games may qualify for copyright registration as audiovisual works, in cases such as Stern v. Kaufman (1982), Midway v. Artic (1983), and Midway v. Dirkschneider (1983). On February 5, 1987, Atari filed for an expedited copyright registration for Breakout, in anticipation of litigation to protect their work. Atari received a reply from the United States Copyright Office dated February 13, saying that there was "not enough original authorship to register a claim". Atari requested reconsideration, but was refused in May, and again in December. The copyright examiners explained that copyright does not protect common geometric shapes, nor the simple audio tones in the game. Moreover, the arrangements of those shapes "are also not registrable since they are created randomly by the player and not by the author of the video game". The Copyright Office also explained that the visual "arrangement is basically dictated by the functional requirements of this or similar backboard type games".

=== Judicial review and second refusal ===
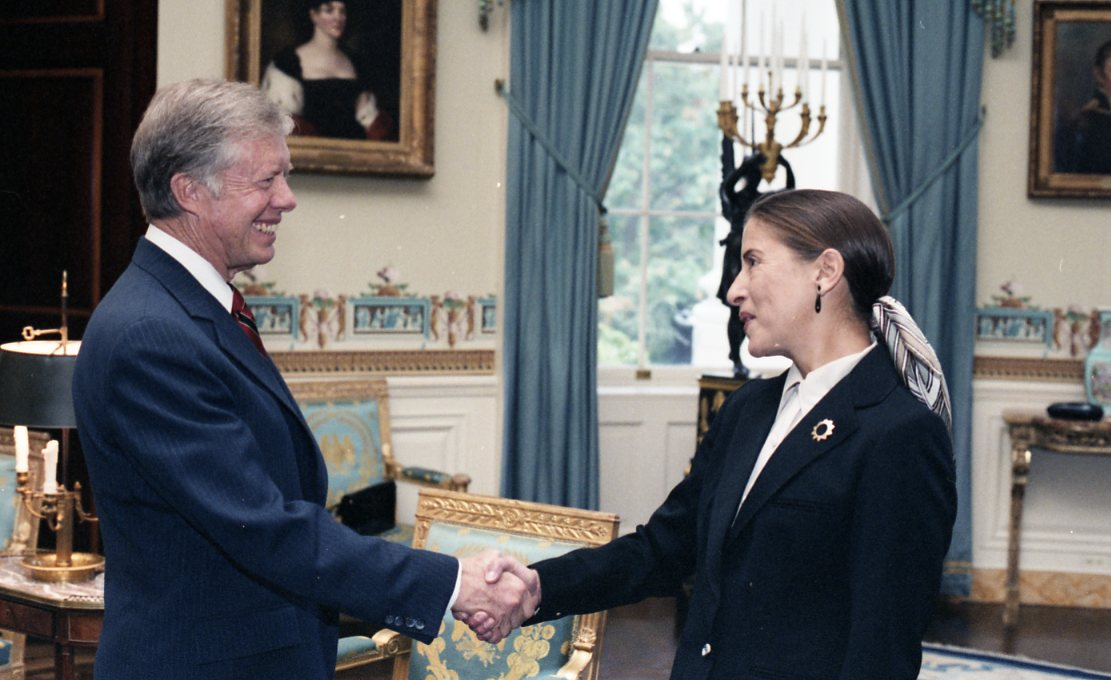
Then-Judge Ruth Bader Ginsburg (right) twice heard Atari v. Oman on appeal.

By the end of 1987, Atari sought court review of the Copyright Office's decision, challenging it as "arbitrary, capricious, an abuse of discretion, or otherwise not in accordance with law". The Copyright Register at the time was Ralph Oman, who made arguments before the court on behalf of the Copyright Office. In May 1988, the district court found that the Register's decision was not an abuse of discretion, and that the Copyright Office had reasonably applied the law.

Atari succeeded on appeal in 1989, with then-Judge (later Justice) Ruth Bader Ginsberg writing for the majority of the United States Court of Appeals for the District of Columbia Circuit. The appeal court noted that simple shapes could be combined in a distinctive manner to indicate ingenuity, and that the register may have failed to focus on the work as a whole, instead focusing solely on its components. Judge Ginsberg concluded that the Copyright Office had not explained what standard of originality was needed for copyright registration. The Register was ordered to give renewed consideration to Atari's copyright application, consistent with the opinion of the appeal court.

After their successful appeal, Atari tried again to register Breakout for copyright. The Copyright Office responded with a second refusal on April 30, 1990, writing that "the display screens both individually and as a whole simply lack sufficient creativity to make them registrable as audiovisual works". Their letter explained that if they were to grant copyright in a painting of flat geometric shapes, the copyright would be based on the brush strokes, depth, and perspective, and not the shapes themselves. Atari sought court review for a second time, but the United States District Court for the District of Columbia dismissed Atari's claim in 1991, once again deferring to the Register. Atari appealed the decision.

=== Final appeal ===
In 1992, the United States Court of Appeals reviewed the second decision of the trial court and the Register of Copyrights. Writing again for the majority, Judge Ruth Bader Ginsberg granted Atari's appeal, holding that Breakout was a copyrightable work.

During this legal dispute, the Supreme Court of the United States ruled on the question of how much originality is needed for a valid copyright registration, in the 1991 case Feist Publications, Inc. v. Rural Telephone Service Co. The decision in Feist became central to the question of copyrightability, establishing that "the requisite level of creativity is extremely low; even a slight amount will suffice." When the Register said that the Feist decision confirmed the Copyright Office's understanding of what constitutes an original work of authorship, the Appeal Court said they could not comprehend how to reconcile Feist with the Register's analysis. Citing Feist, the appeal court explained that a copyrighted work only needed to be more than something "so commonplace that it has come to be expected as a matter of course".

Judge Ginsberg stated that it would be improper to "focus on the individual screens, rather than the flow of the game as a whole," because the expression of a video game is "found in the entire effect of the game as it appears and sounds, its sequence of images." Counsel for the Register argued that the use of non-representational, abstract images showed a lack of creativity. However, the appeal court responded that there was nothing obvious or commonplace about the abstract representation chosen for the game design. In oral arguments, the court responded that the game has "a ball that doesn't operate in any standard way, a wall that doesn't look like a wall. Those are fanciful elements. Are they not?". The court further noted that the colors of the bricks were not typical of a standard wall. In finding that the minimal threshold of creativity had been met, the court mentioned the synchronization of graphics and sound, the ball's changing speed and fanciful physics, and the design and placement of the scoreboard.

The appeal court ruled that the Register was unreasonable in rejecting the copyright application, measured against the "extremely low" level of creativity suggested by the Supreme Court in Feist.

== Impact ==
Atari received a copyright registration, which could be used to prevent competition from alleged Breakout clones. When Breakout-style games for the iPhone began to appear on the App Store in 2008, Atari sent takedown notices to have them removed. In 2017, Atari sued Nestle for using the likeness of Breakout in an ad, replacing the images of bricks with small Kit Kat bars.

Building on video game case law such as Atari v. Amusement World (1981), Atari v. North American Phillips (1982), and Midway v. Artic (1983), the decision in Atari v. Oman established that copyright law applies to the audiovisual outputs of video games. Granting copyright to the audiovisual display is important to protect games not just from clone developers who copy the game's code verbatim, but also those who write distinct code to mimic the audiovisual aspects. The copyrightable creativity described in Atari v. Oman can be found in the selection and arrangement of graphic elements on the screen, as well as the sequence of these screens.

The case is also influential for shaping the legal understanding of originality required for copyright. In several software cases that followed Atari v Oman, courts interpreted the originality requirement with the same minimalist standard. Tracy Lea Meade in the Journal of Intellectual Property Law notes that the Supreme Court did not set out a test for copyright originality in Feist, leaving other courts to develop this logic. As one of the first copyright cases after Feist, Atari v. Oman is remembered for creating a test for originality from words such as "obvious" or "mechanical", granting copyright to Breakout for surpassing a "negative" definition of what it is not. Katherine McDaniel in the Chicago-Kent Journal of Intellectual Property states that Atari v. Oman established that an arrangement of simple geometric shapes may be eligible for copyright protection if it involves a modicum of creativity.

The role of the Register of Copyrights was also impacted by Atari v Oman, challenging their discretion on the issue of copyrightability. After the first Atari v. Oman appeal, the Nebraska Law Review suggested that the courts had provided little guidance about the standard of creativity required for copyright protection. But the second Atari v. Oman appeal was a break from the past, according to Kevin Hooper in IDEA: Journal of Law and Technology, increasing the chances that a copyright claimant would succeed in registration. Decades later, the U.S. Copyright Office cites Atari v. Oman for the principle that an audiovisual work needs only sufficient amount of original and creative human authorship to be copyrightable.

The case is also known for its participants, several of whom later became notable figures in their own right: Breakout creators Jobs and Wozniak also founded Apple Inc., Atari founder Bushnell later founded Chuck E. Cheese, and Judge Ginsberg was eventually appointed to the United States Supreme Court. Ginsberg's pattern of support for authors and copyright owners is highlighted by The Nevada Law Journal, remembering both these decisions as Atari v Oman I and II.
