= Video game clone =

Video game that resembles another video game

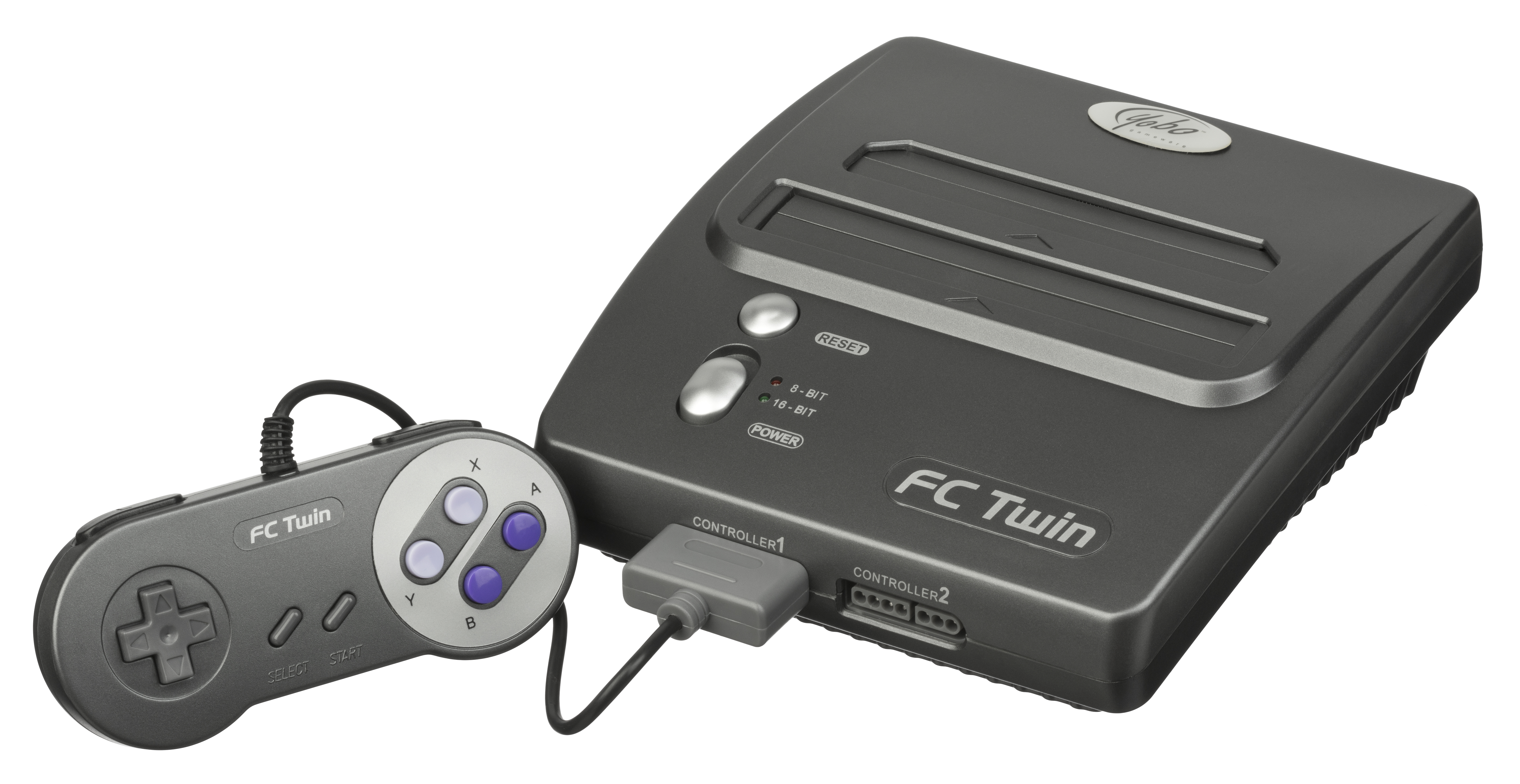
The FC Twin, a popular clone system compatible with game cartridges for the original Nintendo Entertainment System and the Super NES

A video game clone is either a video game or a video game console very similar to, or heavily inspired by, a previous popular game or console. Clones are typically made to take financial advantage of the popularity of the cloned game or system, but clones may also result from earnest attempts to create homages or expand on game mechanics from the original game. An additional motivation unique to the medium of games as software with limited compatibility, is the desire to port a simulacrum of a game to platforms that the original is unavailable for or unsatisfactorily implemented on.

The legality of video game clones is governed by copyright and patent law. In the 1970s, Magnavox controlled several patents to the hardware for Pong, and pursued action against unlicensed Pong clones that led to court rulings in their favor, as well as legal settlements for compensation. As game production shifted to software on discs and cartridges, Atari sued Philips under copyright law, allowing them to shut down several clones of Pac-Man. By the end of the 1980s, courts had ruled in favor of a few alleged clones, and the high costs of a lawsuit meant that most disputes with alleged clones were ignored or settled through to the mid-2000s. In 2012, courts ruled against alleged clones in both Tetris Holding, LLC v. Xio Interactive, Inc. and Spry Fox, LLC v. Lolapps, Inc., due to explicit similarities between the games' expressive elements.

Legal scholars agree that these cases establish that general game ideas, game mechanics, and stock scenes cannot be protected by copyright – only the unique expression of those ideas. However, the high cost of a lawsuit combined with the fact-specific nature of each dispute has made it difficult to predict which game developers can protect their games' look and feel from clones. Other methods like patents, trademarks, and industry regulation have played a role in shaping the prevalence of clones.

== Overview ==
'Adaptation' is such a flattering word. So much nicer than 'copyright infringement'

— Sid Meier on his early clones of Space Invaders and Pac-Man, 2021

Cloning a game in digital marketplaces is common. It is hard to prevent and easy to compete with existing games. Developers can copyright the graphics, title, story, and characters, but have more difficulty protecting software design and game mechanics. A patent for the mechanics is possible but expensive and time-consuming. Popular game concepts often lead to that concept becoming incorporated or expanded upon by other developers. In other cases, games may be developed with clear influence from one or more earlier games. Such derivations are not always considered clones though the term may be used to make a comparison between games. As copyright law does not protect game mechanics, the reuse of such ideas is generally considered acceptable. For example, Grand Theft Auto III spurred a number of games that have been called GTA clones but which are not direct copies of assets or mechanical ideas. In these cases, games that are "clones" of another are generally not implied to have committed any intellectual property infractions, and otherwise considered legally acceptable practices, although calling such games clones is generally considered derogatory.

True video game clones occur when competitors, on seeing the success of a video game title, attempt to compete by creating a near-copy of the existing game with similar assets and gameplay with little additional innovation; developer Jenova Chen compared the nature of these clones similar to plagiarism in which there is little attempt to distinguish the new work from the original. Video game clones are seen by those developing them as low risk; knowing that a game or genre is popular, developing a clone of that game would appear to be a safe and quick investment, in contrast with developing a new title with unknown sales potential. Further, cloning of games from smaller developers, particularly indie developers, is more frequent as these small teams lack the financial resources to pursue legal recourse. Instead, these teams often appeal to social influence to try to have the cloner take corrective actions.

== History ==
=== Hardware cloning (1970s–2000s) ===
Cloning of video games came early in the arcade video game industry shortly after the release of Pong by Atari in 1972. Its success led to numerous companies buying a copy of the arcade machine to try to make their own versions. Atari's Nolan Bushnell called these vendors "jackals", but took no legal action and instead focused on making new games to try to outpace them. Bushnell also maintained contractual agreements with Bally Manufacturing and Midway Manufacturing; in the case of Midway, Atari providing Midway with a licensed Pong design that Midway released as Winner.

One of those companies that had copied Pong was Allied Leisure, which had released its Paddle Battle arcade game in early 1973. When the market shifted from the two-player to four-player table tennis versions in mid-1973, Allied Leisure produced two new arcade games, Tennis Tourney and Ric-o-chet, both which Midway stated caused demand for the two-player Winner to drop dramatically. To stay competitive, Midway acquired one of Allied's games to compare the printed circuit board to that from Winner as to determine what was the new components for making it a four-player game, and added that to Winner's board, and released as Winner IV. Allied Leisure filed suit against Midway claiming copyright infringement of using its printed circuit board design in making Winner IV and unfair competition, but the judge failed to agree to a preliminary injunction, ruling that while a drawing of the printed circuit board may have copyright protection, the physical board itself would not and instead would be covered by patents, which were not involved in this case. The case was settled out of court in 1974 for undisclosed terms, believed due to factors relating to a short downturn in the market, as David Braun, the CEO of Allied Leisure had said in 1974 that "th[e] video game is yesterday's newspaper". The settlement was also likely due to pressure from the patent issues that had arisen around the home versions of Pong in the first generation of consoles that were occurring simultaneously.

The base ideas of a home video game console were developed by Ralph H. Baer while working at Sanders Associates, where in 1966 he began work on what ultimately became his "Brown Box" prototype. After securing approval of a proposal for his idea from his superiors, Baer worked with Sanders engineers Bill Harrison and Bill Rusch to execute its design while keeping it within a low cost target. By 1967, the optimized design was ready to be shopped to other manufacturers as Sanders was not in that market area. To protect the idea, Sanders applied for and received three patents in Baer's, Harrison's, and Rusch's names, covering their "television gaming apparatus"; this included the 1974 reissued U.S. Patent RE28,507 for a "television gaming apparatus", U.S. Patent 3,659,285 for a "television gaming apparatus and method", and U.S. Patent 3,728,480 for a "television gaming and training apparatus". Sanders eventually licensed the technology and the patents to Magnavox, which used it to make the Magnavox Odyssey, released in 1972. In 1974, Magnavox sued several companies on patent infringement for creating and distributing table-tennis arcade games including Atari and Midway. Atari settled in 1976 and agreed to pay Magnavox US$1,500,000 for a perpetual license to the three patents and other technology sharing agreements, allowing them to continue to release their home version of Pong. This case was ultimately decided in Magnavox's favor against the remaining defendants in early 1977.

However, just as with the arcade version, the home version of Pong drew a number of third-party hardware manufacturers to make Pong clones on the market, to a point where it was estimated that Atari's Pong console represented only about a third of sales of home Pong consoles. Magnavox continued to pursue action against these Pong clones using the three patents, estimated to have won over US$100 million in damages from suits and settlements through the lifetime of the patents. Threats of lawsuits did not prevent more clones of the home console systems from being built, as these dedicated consoles were relatively risk free and easy to manufacture. This led to a flooded dedicated-game console market, and creating the industry's first market crash in 1977.

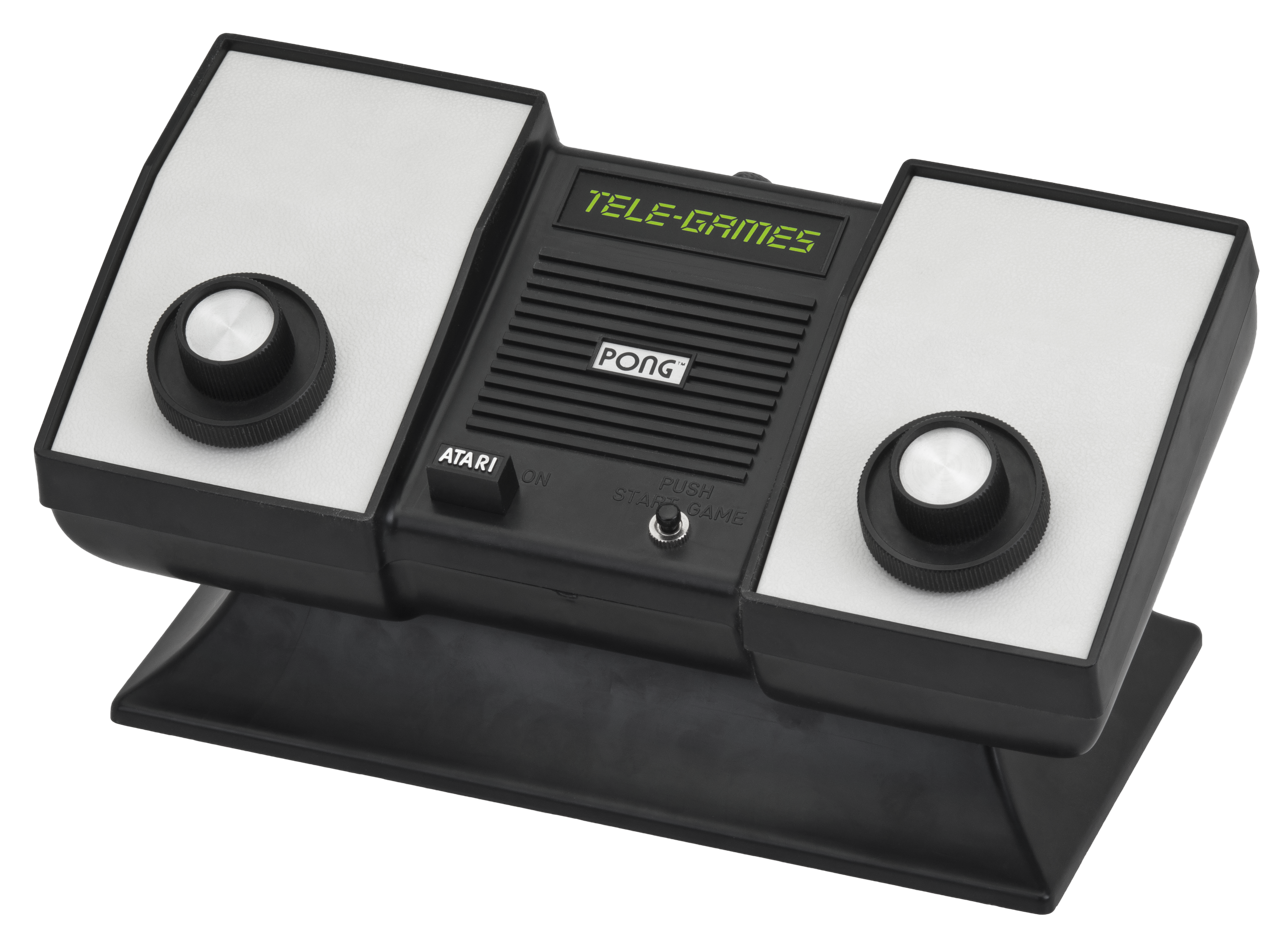
The original Atari Pong home console, labeled with Sears' "Tele-games" brand

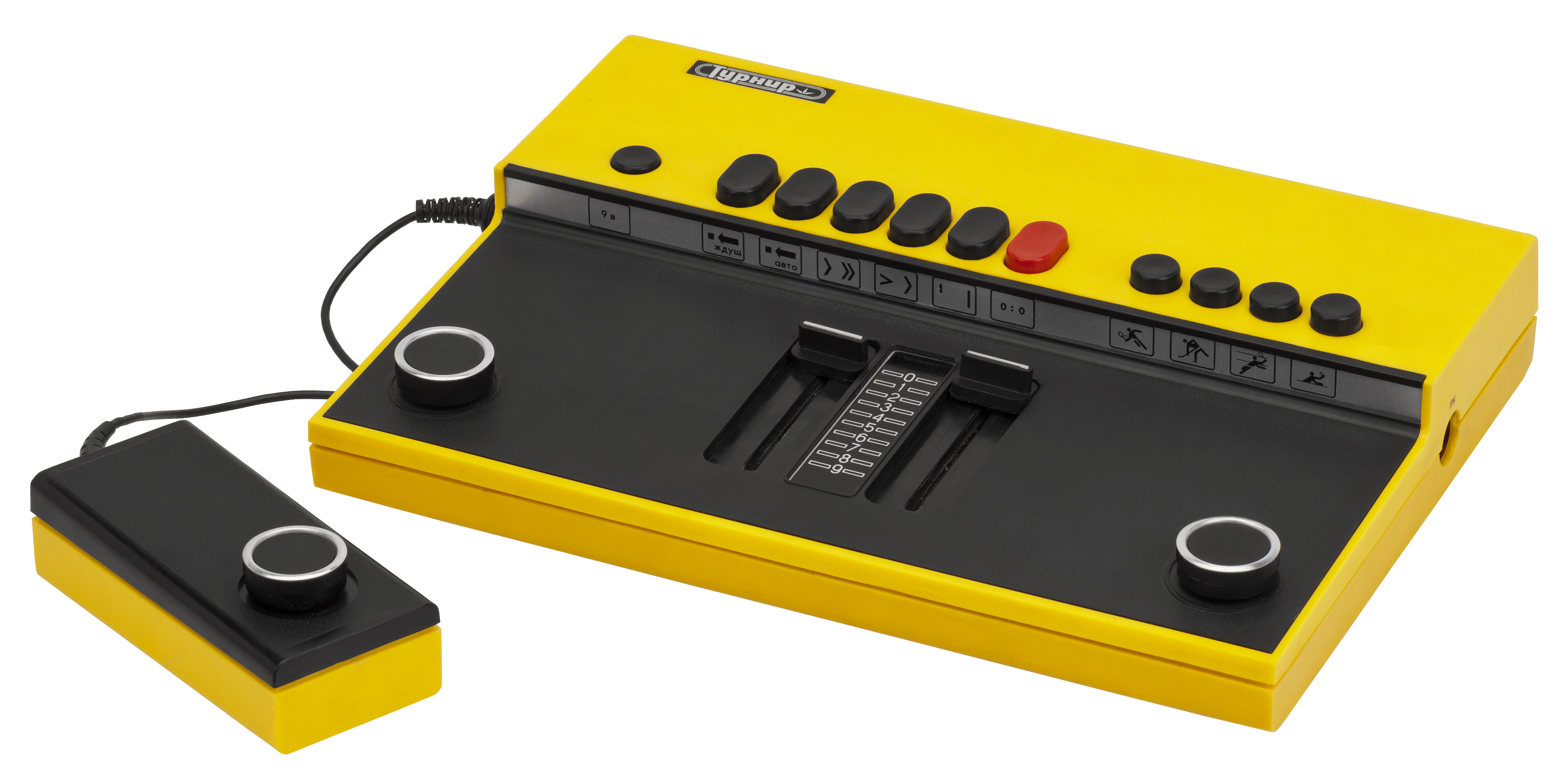
The Russian "Турнир" ("Tournament") Pong clone

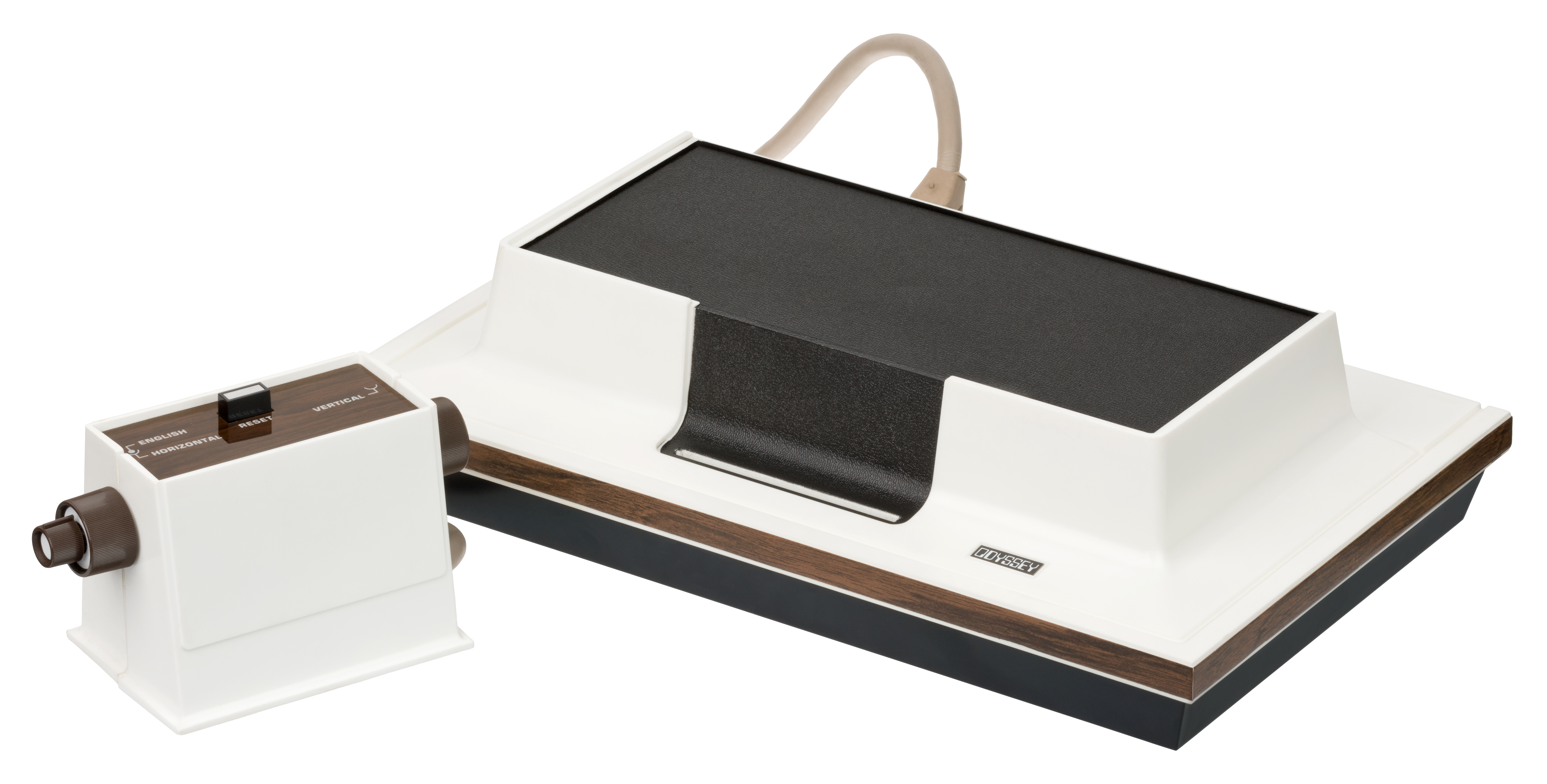
The Magnavox Odyssey

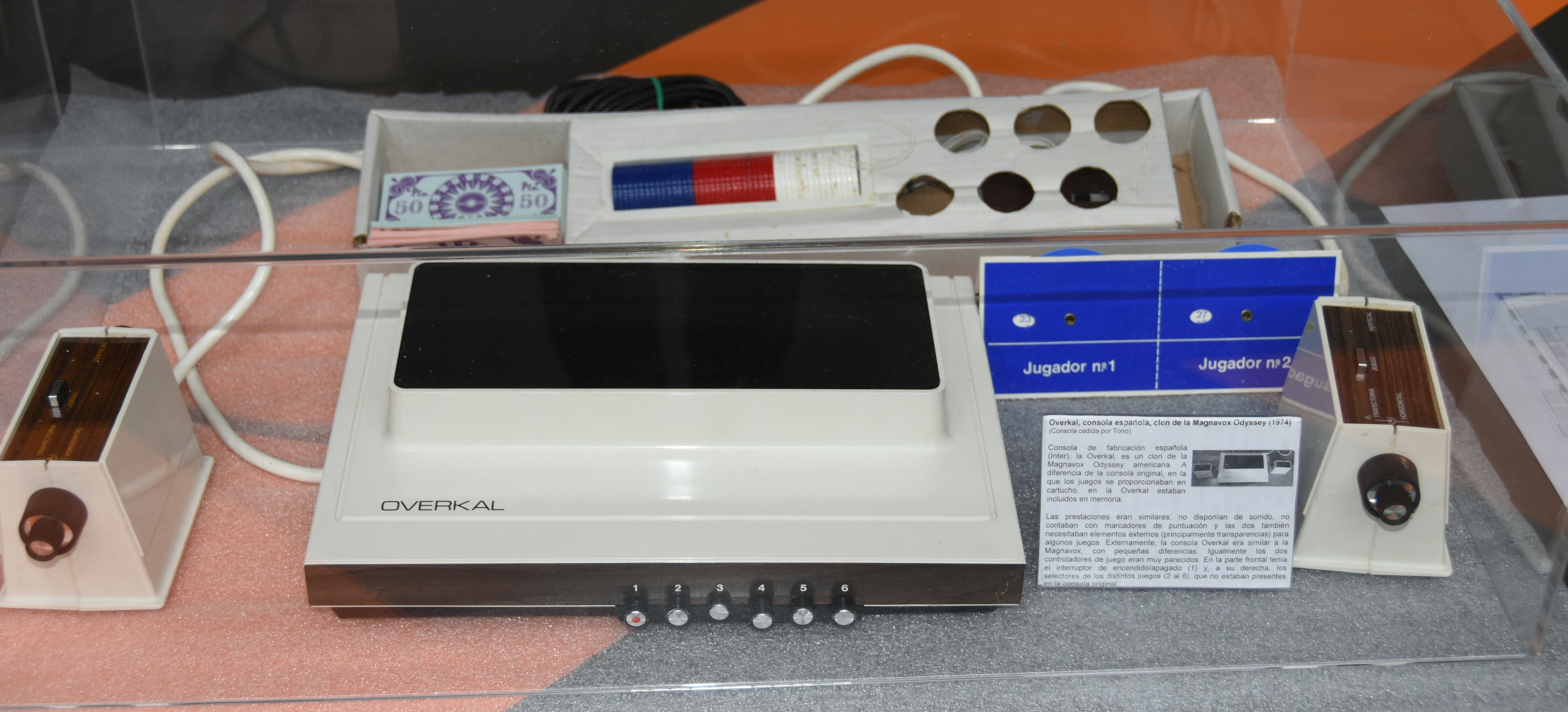
The Overkal, made by Inter Electrónica S.A. in 1974, a clone of the Magnavox Odyssey for the Spanish market

Eventually, home consoles switched from built-in games to programmable microprocessor-based systems that operated from software stored in game cartridges within the second generation, making it more difficult to clone at the hardware level. However, off-brand manufacturers attempted to make bootleg copies of these consoles that has a similar form as the known console, but typically could only play built in games frequently on a liquid-crystal display (LCD). Other bootleg consoles would take the workings of older systems and repackage them in a newer housing that appears like the known consoles capable of playing the games from the original system. The latter was particularly true of consoles that attempted to clone the Nintendo Entertainment System (known as the Famicom system in Japan), which was not available in some countries in the Eastern European and Chinese regions, leading manufacturers within those nations to make numerous bootleg versions, knowing that it would be near-impossible for Nintendo to seek legal action against them.

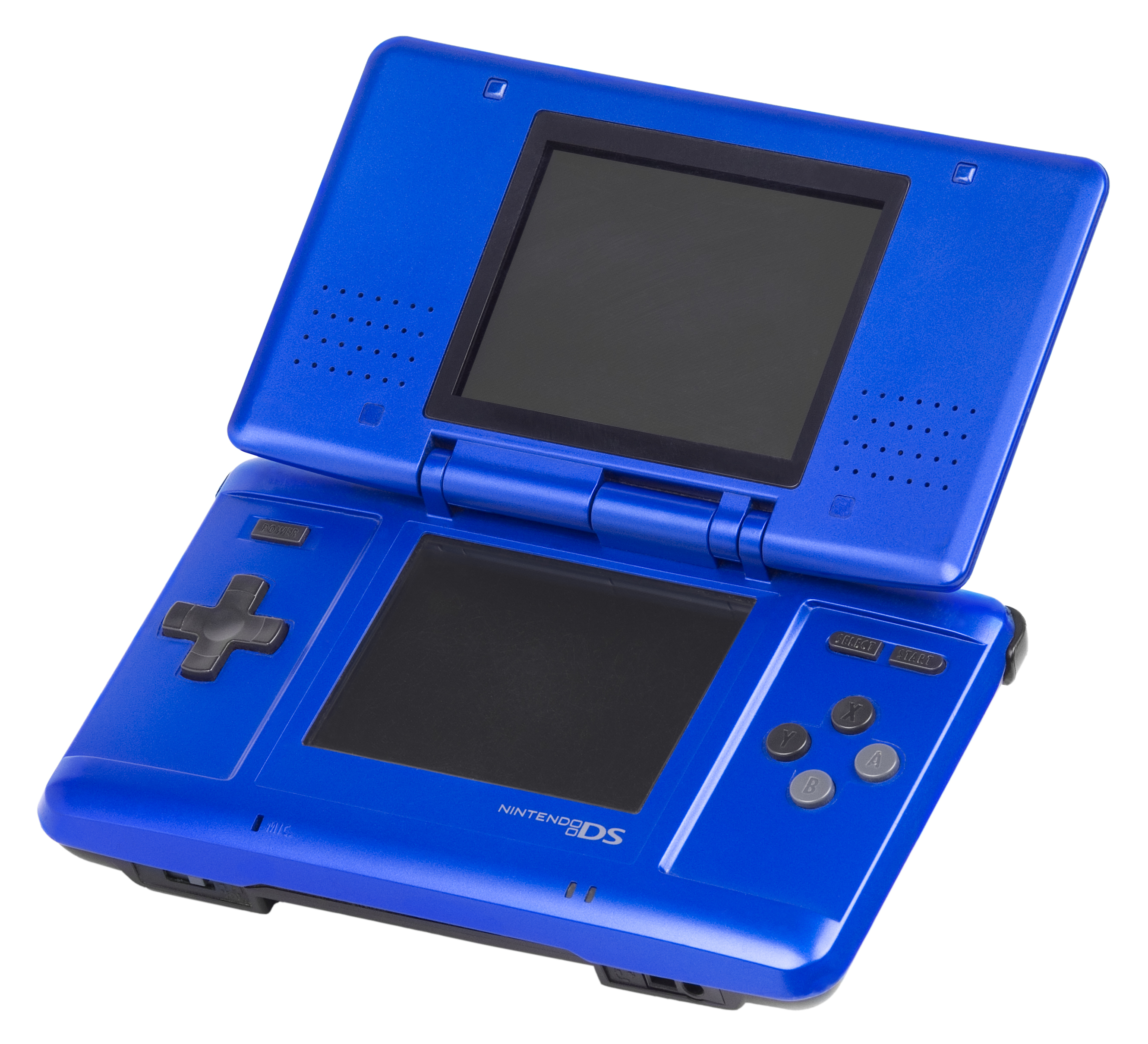
The Nintendo DS

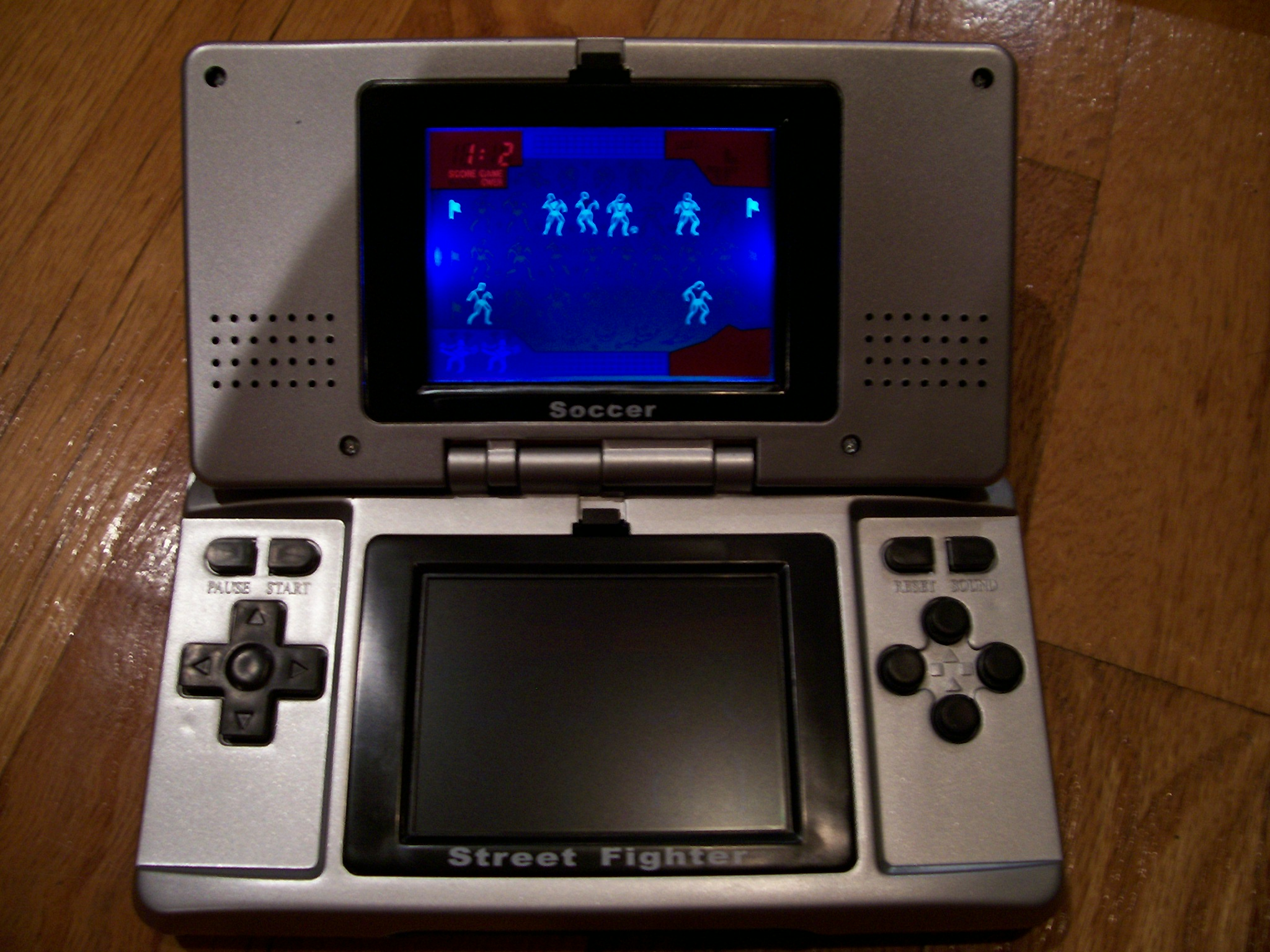
Neo Double Games, mimicking the design of the DS, but games are played on a segmented LCD screen

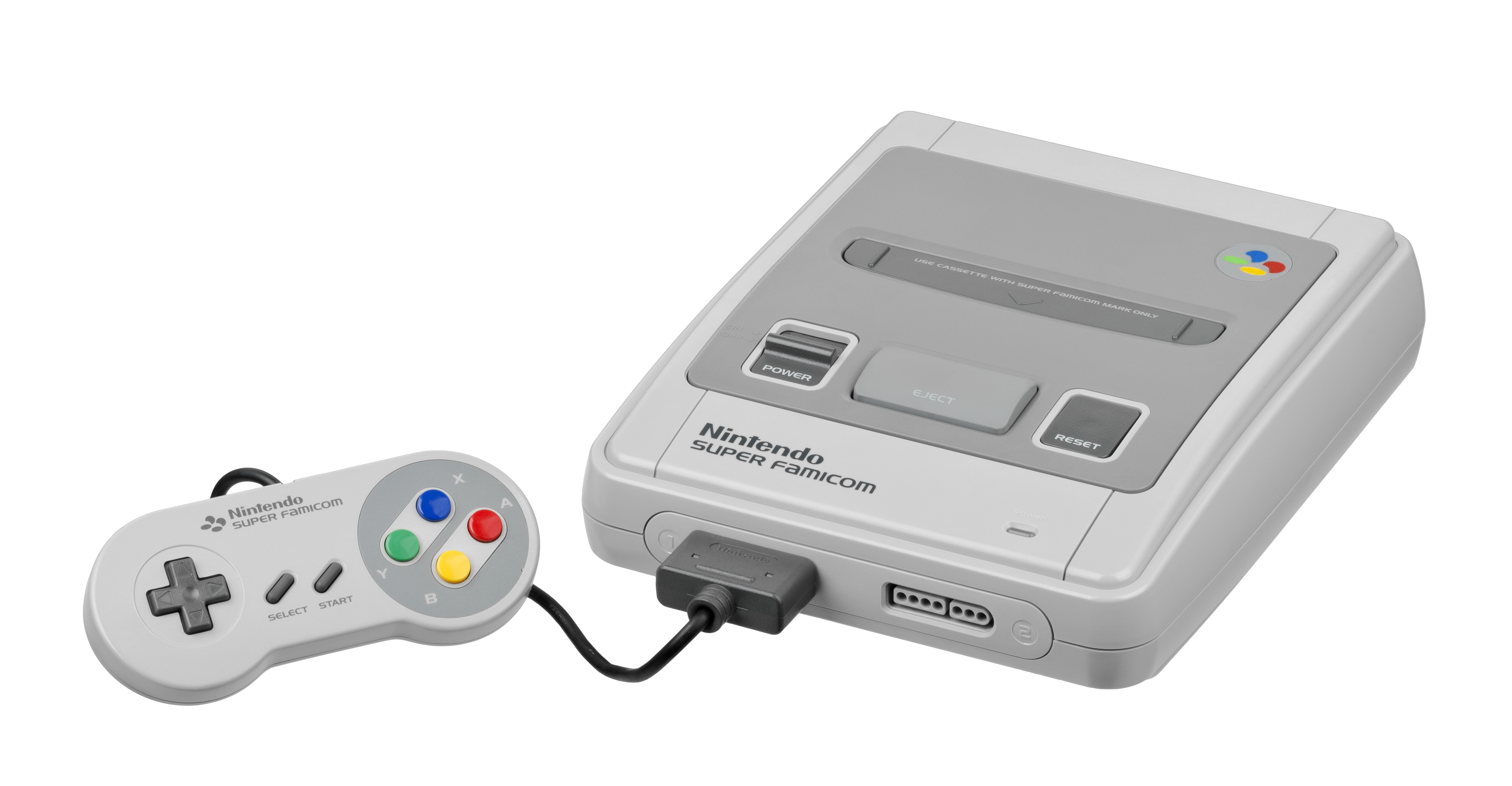
The Nintendo Super Famicom console

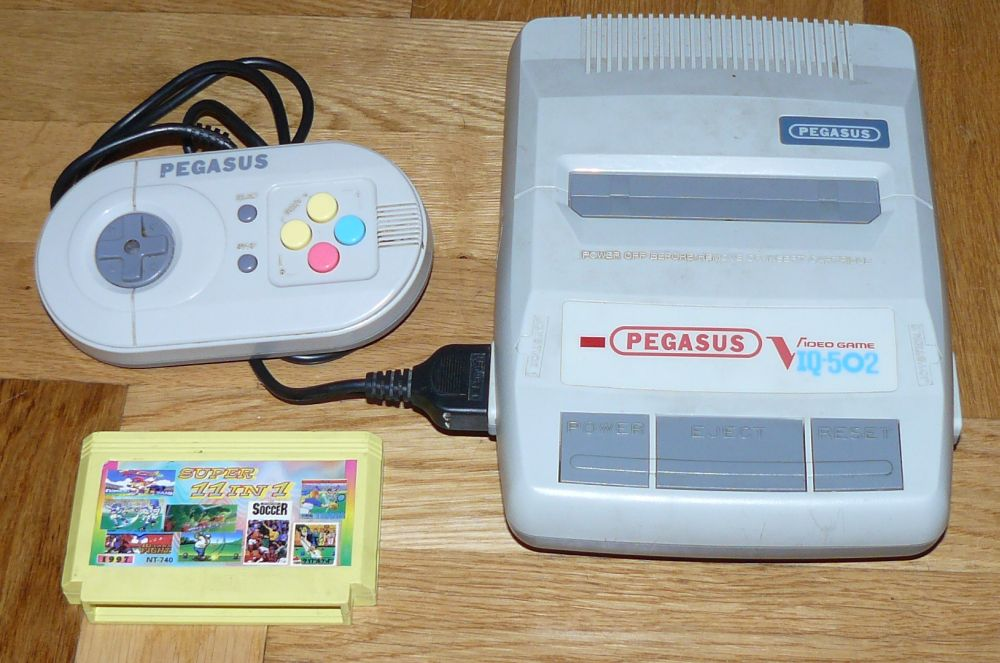
The Pegasus, sold only in Eastern European states, was a Famicom clone though styled after the Super Famicom system.

Closed consoles were not the only cloned systems. The ZX Spectrum had been released in the United Kingdom in 1982 and its low cost compared to other home computers helped give birth to the video game sector in the UK as well as Western Europe. The system could not be imported into the Eastern bloc countries, but enterprising companies found ways to clone the ZX Spectrum hardware at even lower cost. With teenagers and young adults able to afford these hardware clones, they too were able to begin developing their own games and helped to launch the video game industry within these countries.

=== Early copyright protection (1980s) ===
While hardware itself became difficult to clone, the software of games were subsequently used in unlicensed copies for other systems. Cloning of arcade video games was popular during the arcade's "golden age" in the early 1980s. Arcade games, prior to mass production, were made in limited numbers for field testing in public spaces; once news got out that a new arcade game from industry leaders like Atari was out in the open, third-party competitors would be able to scope the game and rush to make a clone of the game, either as a new arcade game or for home consoles; an occurrence which happened with Missile Command in 1980. This ultimately diluted the market for new arcade games.

An early legal question was whether video games were even eligible for intellectual property protection, as both industry and legal experts were unclear on whether copyright law applied. One such game was Breakout, which inspired many games, including Arkanoid, which itself inspired many other clones. When Atari decided to register its Copyright in Breakout, Register of Copyrights Ralph Oman refused to register the work because it "did not contain at least a minimum amount of original pictorial or graphic authorship, or authorship in sounds". Atari challenged Oman's decision not to award the game copyright protection, and courts sided with Atari that even simple video games could become copyrightable works, as they were both fixed and original expression. Midway sued Artic for making Puckman, an alleged clone of Pac-Man, with Artic responding that video games were not "fixed in any tangible medium of expression" and thus ineligible for copyright. Courts sided with Midway that aspects of an arcade game were copyrightable, even though the images that appeared on the screen were transient. Stern Electronics, Inc. v. Kaufman similarly decided that the look and feel of a game was fixed, and thus copyrightable, despite differences in the images between different player playthroughs. Thus, it became widely established that video games were eligible for copyright protection, against potentially infringing clones.

The most widely cloned arcade games in the early 1980s included Space Invaders (1978), Pac-Man (1980) and Donkey Kong (1981), clones of which were available for various different platforms by 1983. Clones and variants numbered in the hundreds for Space Invaders and Pac-Man, more than a hundred for Frogger, and dozens for Donkey Kong. They were programmed by professional and amateur coders for platforms ranging from desktop microcomputers to graphing calculators. Nintendo estimated a loss of over $100 million to Donkey Kong clones on various different platforms despite attempts at litigation to stop them; the matter was further complicated by the Universal City Studios, Inc. v. Nintendo Co., Ltd. case where Universal Studios who claimed ownership over King Kong attempted to take action against Donkey Kong and its clones, notably the Tiger Electronics handheld electronic game King Kong, but the court ruled in Nintendo's favor along with ordering Tiger to pay damages to Nintendo.

BYTE reported in December 1981 that at least eight clones of Atari's arcade game Asteroids existed for personal computers. The magazine stated in December 1982 that that year "few games broke new ground in either design or format ... If the public really likes an idea, it is milked for all it's worth, and numerous clones of a different color soon crowd the shelves. That is, until the public stops buying or something better comes along. Companies who believe that microcomputer games are the hula hoop of the 1980s only want to play Quick Profit". The degree of cloning was so great that in 1981, Atari warned in full-page advertisements "Piracy: This Game is Over", stating that the company "will protect its rights by vigorously enforcing [its] copyrights and by taking appropriate action against unauthorized entities who reproduce or adapt substantial copies of ATARI games", like a home-computer clone. In Atari, Inc. v. Amusement World, Inc. (547 F. Supp. 222, 1982), Atari sued Amusement World claiming that its video game Meteors violated their copyright on Asteroids. The court did find twenty-two similarities between the two games, but ruled against Atari's claims, citing these elements as scènes à faire for games about shooting at asteroids. This was based on a principle in copyright law known as the idea-expression distinction, that copyright does not protect ideas, but instead their unique expression.

In 1980, Namco released Pac-Man which became a massive commercial success, leading to the development of numerous Pac-Man clones. Between October 1980 and December 1981, the Pac-Man game alone generated $150 million in sales. Philips was one of several developers who attempted to create their own maze game, resulting in K.C. Munchkin! released in 1981. Atari sued Philips in Atari, Inc. v. North American Philips Consumer Electronics Corp., claiming that the game K.C. Munchkin! had illegally copied their game Pac-Man. The court initially refused Atari's motion to bar the sales of Munchkin, but Atari succeeded on appeal, with Judge Harlington Wood applying the abstraction test to find that Munchkin had in fact copied the unique expression of Pac-Man, particularly the character design. As a result of Atari's successful motion, Philips was legally barred from selling K.C. Munchkin. Courts later barred other clones of Pac-Man, including Packri-Monster by Bandai, Puckman by Artic International, and another similar game called Mighty Mouth. Siva Vaidhyanathan suggests that the ruling had a chilling effect on competition for Pac-Man, despite the court stating that copyright did not control the idea of a maze-chase game. Jerry Pournelle wrote in 1984 that "Atari bought itself about a million dollars worth of unfavorable publicity by bullying some very nice teen-aged programmers; surely they could have been smoother about it".

=== Loosening of protection (1988–2012) ===
The Atari v. Philips decision established that video game clones could be held liable for copying other games, because K.C. Munchkin! had substantial similarities to Pac-Man. However, the court also noted that several aspects of the games were standard or common, and thus not protected by copyright. By the late 1980s, courts began to take a more permissive approach with video game clones, deciding that many elements of creativity cannot be protected, such as generic concepts, functional rules, and scènes à faire. One such ruling was the 1988 case Data East USA, Inc. v. Epyx, Inc., where courts ruled that Epyx's game World Karate Championship did not infringe Data East's game Karate Champ, because none of the similarities were protected under copyright. This was based on the idea that the general gameplay of a martial arts game was an idea that was free for anyone to use, and could not be protected by copyright as unique expression.

In 1991, game developer Capcom released Street Fighter II. Its popularity led to an explosion of interest in the fighting game genre. Other companies rushed to capitalize, and Data East released their own one-on-one fighting game called Fighter's History in 1994. As it was later revealed, Data East created design documents that referred to Street Fighter II several times. Several people noticed the similarities and raised the issue with Capcom, reaching the president, Kenzo Tsujimoto. Capcom soon sued Data East for copyright infringements, in both America and Japan. Capcom also sought a preliminary injunction to stop Data East from distributing Fighter's History. Data East used the argument that had previously been used to thwart their 1988 lawsuit against Epyx, that none of the elements that were similar to Capcom's Street Fighter were protectable under copyright. The court noted the similarities between several moves and characters, but insisted "that the vast majority of the moves are unprotectable because they are commonplace kicks and punches". Capcom U.S.A. lost the case on grounds that the copied elements were excluded from copyright protection, as generic scènes à faire. The case was one of several that made it difficult for a copyright holder to win a lawsuit against an alleged clone, and also allowed game genres to develop based on imitation and iteration. Many game mechanics from Street Fighter II became common to the genre, as well as aspects of the fighting game Mortal Kombat.

With the costs of filing a lawsuit being very high compared to the expected outcome, many video game copyright holders became hesitant to sue alleged clones. Most lawsuits about alleged clones were settled between the mid-1990s through to the mid-2000s. The success of the 1993 game Myst led to a number of similar 3D adventure games, which were sometimes labeled as "Myst clones". Some video game genres are founded by archetypal games of which all subsequent similar games are considered derivatives; notably, early first-person shooters were often called "Doom clones", while the success of the open-world formula in Grand Theft Auto led to the genre of GTA clones. The genre of endless runners is based on the success and simplicity of the game Canabalt. Such cloning can also cause a relatively-sudden emergence of a new genre as developers attempt to capitalize on the interest. The battle royale genre grew rapidly after the success of PlayerUnknown's Battlegrounds and Fortnite Battle Royale across 2017 and 2018, while Dota Auto Chess released in January 2019 spawned several commercial games in the auto battler genre by mid-2019.

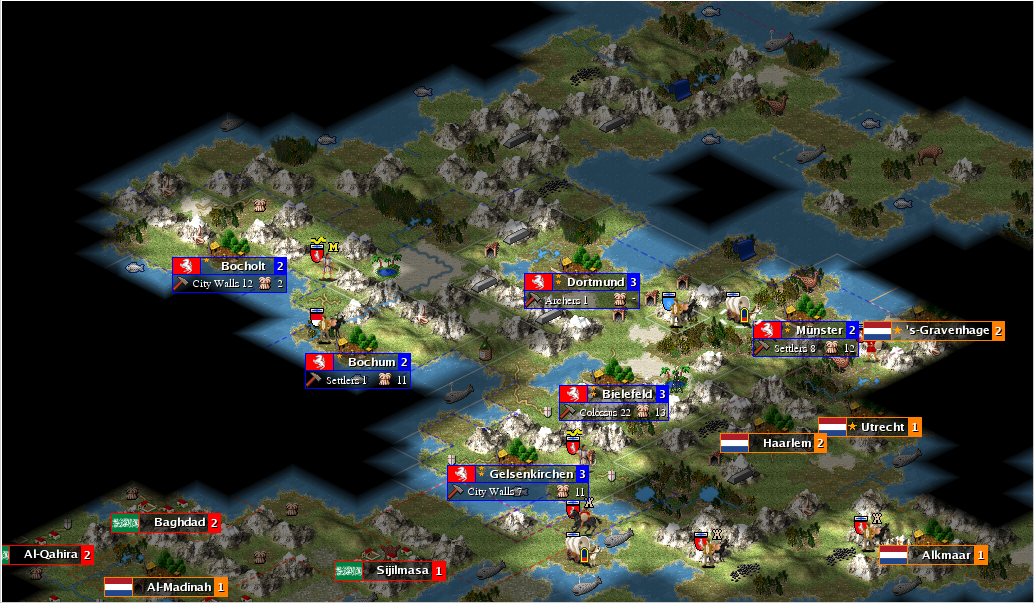
Freeciv is an open-source clone of the Civilization series.

Another type of clone arose from developers in the modding, open source, and indie game communities, where these developers seek to recreate the mechanics of a popular title through reverse engineering, sometimes using their own original assets, and releasing the game typically for free and in homage to the original title. This allows the teams and users to expand upon original elements of the commercial game, such as software bugs that were not fixed, improving gameplay concepts, support for different and newer computers or console platforms, or adding new ideas to the base gameplay principles, as well as easing game extensions through user-created mods or add-ons. Some examples of these clones include Freeciv based on the Civilization series, Osu! based on Osu! Tatakae! Ouendan, and Frets on Fire based on Guitar Hero. The open source nature of these clones also enable new utilities, such as developing artificial intelligence agents that have learned and improved their play in Freeciv which in turn can help advance artificial intelligence research. Such games must be careful not to redistribute the original game's assets or they could face legal issues. OpenSC2K, an open-source recreation of SimCity 2000, was shut down by Electronic Arts after it was found that OpenSC2K used assets from SimCity 2000. Some projects that started as reverse engineered game engine recreations, faithful enough to directly use separately acquired assets from the original game by players who own it, may later become game clones by including the original game assets when the rights owners release the game as freeware, as did OpenRA, a Command & Conquer: Red Alert clone. It even incorporated code from the original game after Electronic Arts re-licensed it under the GPL later, as was the case for many game engines in ScummVM, which subsequently has been used for official re-releases by numerous companies, starting with Revolution Software's Sold Out label budget release of Broken Sword: The Shadow of the Templars. For cloning of original indie games by other indie developers, while such practices do exist, indie developers tend to rely on an informal code of honor to shun those who do engage in cloning.

Clones may also be used as commentary or parody of the original game, usually in a manner considered transformative to qualify as fair use. Pyst is a parody of the adventure game Myst, taking place on seemingly the same island as Myst but vandalized by numerous groups. Hatetris became a variant of Tetris where the next tetranomial provided is the worst possible for the current board.

=== New developments (2012–present) ===
A comparison of in-game screenshots, published in EA's legal filings, of EA's The Sims Social (left) and Zynga's The Ville, demonstrating the similarities in the games' art assets

New concerns related to cloned video games came with the rise of social network and mobile games, typically which were offered as freemium titles to entice new players to play. The rising popularity of these games with casual players led to widespread clones. Zynga was one of the first major developers in social network games, and had long been criticized by the video game industry as cloning popular social and casual games from other developers, includes those of smaller developers without the resources to fight back in courts (as in the case of Tiny Tower by NimbleBit, which Zynga has cloned in their game, Dream Heights) or that are willing to settle out of court (as in the case of Zynga's Mafia Wars, which was accused of cloning David Maestri's Mob Wars). In August 2012, Electronic Arts (EA), via its Maxis division, put forth a lawsuit against Zynga, claiming that its Facebook game, The Ville was a ripoff of EA's own Facebook game, The Sims Social. The lawsuit challenges that The Ville not only copies the gameplay mechanics of The Sims Social, but also uses art and visual interface aspects that appear to be inspired by The Sims Social. Pundits have noted that EA, unlike these previous developers, are financially backed to see the case to completion; EA themselves have stated in the lawsuit that "Maxis isn't the first studio to claim that Zynga copied its creative product. But we are the studio that has the financial and corporate resources to stand up and do something about it". The two companies settled out of court on undisclosed terms in February 2013. According to Brian Reynolds, the former lead gameplay designer at Zynga, the company sees potential new genres and game ideas that gain popularity, and then strive to add their own innovation and concepts to at, so that "[their] goal is to have the highest-quality thing".

In 2009, Xio Interactive released a mobile game called Mino that was based on the gameplay of Tetris, with the belief that their game did not include any legally-protected elements. The game Mino featured the same approach of using falling tetromino blocks to form complete lines on a playfield and score points. Mino also added new power-ups and game modes to the basic Tetris gameplay. While there had been many Tetris clones over the years, Mino was eventually downloaded more than six million times, culminating in The Tetris Company filing a lawsuit against Xio Interactive in December 2009. While the court determined that the idea of a vertically falling block game could not be protected by copyright, they determined that Tetris did have many unique elements making it eligible for copyright protection, including its twenty-by-ten square game board, the display of randomized junk blocks at the start of the game, the display of a block's "shadow" where it will land, and the display of the next piece to fall. Wolfson also granted protection to the blocks changing in color when they land, and the game board filling up when the game is over. In weighing these arguments, Wolfson noted that Mino copied Tetris much more closely than a game like Dr. Mario, a game that utilized the rules of Tetris to express a similar idea in a unique and non-infringing way. Legal and industry experts agreed this signalled that United States courts were becoming more willing to grant broader video games for specific visual arrangements. Though copyright would not limit the imitation of standard game elements, this decision would have the greatest impact on games that copied exact shapes and colors.

In 2012, Spry Fox, LLC v. Lolapps, Inc. was heard in the United States District Court for the Western District of Washington, brought by Spry Fox against developer Lolapps over their game Yeti Town which Spry Fox claimed was a copyright-infringing clone of Triple Town. At the initial hearings, the judge followed similar logic used in the Xio case to order a preliminary injunction in favor of Spry Fox, as Yeti Town had the same look-and-feel as Triple Town when simply viewed side by side. The case was subsequently settled out of court, with Spry Fox gaining ownership of the Yeti Town property by the end of 2012. Since these cases in 2012, legal scholars have found that courts have been more scrutinizing of look-and-feel in cases involving video game clones.

Clones of social and mobile games have continued to flourish as the format gained popularity; the low cost, ease and simplicity of the tools needed to develop these made cloning in that sector a significant problem. For example, Flappy Bird had been cloned dozens of times due to programming code clearinghouses offering templated code to which others could easily add their own art assets. The creators of Threes! spent 14 months developing the game and tuning its mechanics, but the first clone was released 21 days after Threes! and the original was quickly overshadowed by 2048, a clone that was developed over a weekend. While 2048 had been originally published freely and under an open-source license, Ketchapp developed an ad-supported version of 2048 that charted on the App Store. Following its sudden rise to popularity at the start of 2022, Wordle saw a number of clones appear on the App Store in early January, only to be removed in the wake of users criticizing the clone developers. The developers of Vampire Survivors fast-tracked the development of a mobile port of their game as a response to a number of clones that appeared on mobile app stores with stolen code and assets from the original game; Vampire Survivors itself was inspired by a mobile game named Magic Survival.

Another major area of concern for software clones arises within China. From 2000 to 2015, the Chinese government had numerous restrictions on imports of hardware and software, and access to non-Chinese storefronts. While this allowed gaming on personal computers to flourish within China, the cost of acquiring both hardware and software was too expensive for many, leading to Chinese developers to create low-cost clones of popular Western and Japanese titles for the Chinese market, which persist today. Foreign companies are faced with difficulties in seeking legal action against the Chinese developers that have created these clones, making cloning a far less risky process. Thus, it is common for popular games from both Western and Japanese markets to see near-exact clones appear within China, often within weeks of the original game's release. A notable example is a clone of Blizzard Entertainment's Hearthstone called Sleeping Dragon: Heroes of the Three Kingdoms created by Chinese developer Unico, released within a few months of Hearthstone's beta release. Blizzard was ultimately successful in suing Unico for US$1.9 million in damages in 2014. In other cases, clones are made to address elements of the original game that are unsuitable under China's content restriction laws; for example, Tencent, which operated the publishing of PlayerUnknown's Battlegrounds in China, was forced to pull the game due to content related to violence and terrorism, and instead replaced it with a clone, Game for Peace, which otherwise reused assets from Battlegrounds but removed blood and gore. Another Blizzard-related case followed in 2015, when Blizzard Entertainment and NetEase affiliate Shanghai EaseNet obtained a preliminary injunction in China against a World of Warcraft-themed mobile game developed by Chengdu Qiyou and operated by Beijing Fenbo Times (Rekoo). The Guangzhou Intellectual Property Court ordered the defendants to stop reproducing, distributing and disseminating the game during the litigation. The defendants were later ordered to stop operating and publishing the game and to pay RMB 6 million in damages.

With the advancement of generative AI in both generating art assets and programming via vibe coding, clones of simple, popular games using AI grew in 2025 and 2026. Games like Peak, R.E.P.O. and Meccha Chameleon which had seen millions of players with their first few weeks of release, led to multiple copycat games that used AI to imitate both the art and gameplay mechanics. These games can siphon sales of the original game as many game storefronts have minimal protections in identifying such clones.

== Legal aspects related to clones ==
Video game clones are generally difficult to prevent through intellectual property laws such as copyright, patents, or trademarks. The game industry has generally been built on the concept of building atop gameplay concepts from other developers to make novel games, but avoiding outright copying element for element as to make a direct clone. Broadly, video games lack a fixed medium, and fall into the same area as software copyright where underlying source code as well as art and other assets qualify for copyright, but the gameplay does not. In the United States specifically, video games fall into the idea–expression distinction, that one cannot copyright the underlying gameplay but can copyright a specific implementation of it. Case law until 2012 has generally favorable to clones, often ruling that clones of a game do not violate copyright since they meet scènes à faire principle, elements necessary for a specific theme of a game.

However, in two separate U.S. cases in 2012, Tetris Holding, LLC v. Xio Interactive, Inc. and Spry Fox, LLC v. Lolapps, Inc., courts found using the Abstraction-Filtration-Comparison test that clones that not only copy gameplay without excessive changes but also too much of the original game's look and feel were in violation of copyright law. This new approach gave developers a better means to fight against direct clones. Despite this, there has only been an incremental increase, with the courts applying this legal standard carefully to new cases. Legal scholars have argued that the high costs of a legal dispute combined with the specific facts of each alleged clone have made these cases difficult to predict, and thus it is still rare that they proceed to trial. Wired compared a history of these rulings both for and against infringement, and described the idea-expression distinction – that copyright law won't protect an idea, only its expression – as "simple to state" but "difficult to apply".

Patents have been used to protect novel gameplay ideas, such as the navigation system in Sega's Crazy Taxi games. Sega sued Fox Interactive for patent infringement for their use of a similar system in The Simpsons: Road Rage, a case that was ultimately settled out of court. Nintendo and The Pokemon Company have filed a patent infringement lawsuit against Pocketpair, the developers of Palworld, accusing the company of violating their patents related to monster-catching games. Trademarks have also been used in a very limited fashion to block other developers from using the same terminology for their games or gameplay.

== Industry regulation ==
More recently, with the popularity of social and mobile game stores like Apple's App Store for iOS system and Google Play for Android-based systems, a large number of likely-infringing clones have begun appearing. While such storefronts typically include a review process before games and apps can be offered on them, these processes do not consider copyright infringement of other titles. Instead, they rely on the developer of the work that has been cloned to initiate a complaint regarding the clone, which may take time for review. The cloned apps often are purposely designed to resemble other popular apps by name or feel, luring away purchasers from the legitimate app, even after complaints have been filed. Apple has released a tool to streamline claims of app clones to a team dedicated to handle these cases, helping to bring the two parties together to try to negotiate prior to action. While Apple, Google, and Microsoft took steps to stem the mass of clones based on Swing Copters after its release, experts believe it is unlikely that these app stores will institute any type of proactive clone protection outside of clear copyright violations, and these experts stress the matter is better done by the developers and gaming community to assure the original developer is well known, protects their game assets on release, and gets the credit for the original game.

Valve, which operates the Steam digital storefront for games on personal computers, also takes steps to remove games that are clearly copyright-infringing clones of other titles on the service, once notified of the issue.

== See also ==
- Famiclone
- Grand Theft Auto clone
- Homebrew (video games)
- ROM hacking
- List of Pac-Man clones
- Spiritual successor
