= Canadian Admiral Corp v Rediffusion Inc =

Canadian copyright lawsuit before the Exchequer Court

Canadian Admiral Corporation Ltd. v. Rediffusion Inc., [1954] Ex. CR 382, 20 CPR 75 is a Canadian copyright law decision by the Exchequer Court (a predecessor of the Federal Court of Canada). The Court held that rebroadcasting of public performances by cable companies did not violate any communication rights or public performance rights. There cannot be copyright in telecasting live events because there is insufficient fixation. The result of the case became a major factor in the following growth of the Canadian cable television industry.

== Background ==
A football game was broadcast live from the stadium by a set of three cameras directed by a producer in a van just outside the venue. The game was not recorded in any format and was broadcast live to viewers. Canadian Admiral has purchased the rights to the live feed from the game. Rediffusion, a cable company, captured the transmission of the broadcast and sold it to private homes and public show rooms. Canadian Admiral sued for copyright infringement.

The issue was whether Canadian Admiral owned any copyright in the football game.

== Opinion of the Court ==
The Court held that there was no copyright in the rebroadcast of a live game. As a general rule there can be no copyright in a sports event. The games are not pre-planned and not predictable. Moreover, the live direction by the producer was an insufficient amount of planning to create any fixation. Cameron J held that "[f]or copyright to subsist in a work, it must be expressed to some extent at least in some material form, capable of identification and having a more or less permanent endurance."

== Aftermath ==
While the Copyright Act has never expressly made material form a condition of copyright subsistence, Canadian Admiral suggested that it was required. However, that is not to imply that a work cannot arise without fixation.

Canadian Admiral was not followed by the Federal Court of Appeal in the 1993 case of Canadian Cable Television Assn v Canada ( Copyright Board ), in which Létourneau JA held that other Commonwealth rulings that have considered when a performance takes place (Note: Messager v British Broadcasting Co, [1927] 2 KB 543; Garware Plastics and Polyester v. Telelink, AIR 1989 Bom 331.; Chappell & Co Ltd v Associated Radio Co of Australia Ltd [1925] VicLawRp 46, [1925] VLR 350, Supreme Court (Vic, Australia).) "take a realistic view of the impact and effect of technological developments and they are consistent with the plain and usual meaning of the words 'in public', that is to say openly, without concealment and to the knowledge of all."

== See also ==
- List of notable Canadian lower court cases
