= Stern Electronics, Inc. v. Kaufman =

American legal case

Stern Electronics, Inc. v Kaufman
- Court: United States Court of Appeals for the Second Circuit
- Full case name: STERN ELECTRONICS, INC v. Harold KAUFMAN d/b/a Bay Coin, et al; Omni Video Games, Inc., et al.
- Argued: July 15 1981
- Decided: January 20 1982
- Citation: 669 F.2d 852 (1982)

Case history
- Procedural history: Preliminary injunction issued against defendants, 523 F. Supp. 635 (E.D.N.Y. 1981)

Holding
- An electronics company can copyright the sounds and images in a video game, not just the source code.

Court membership
- Judges sitting: Circuit Judges Jon O. Newman, Ellsworth Van Graafeiland District Judge Edward Dumbauld

Case opinions
- Majority: Newman

Laws applied
- Copyright Act of 1976

Stern Electronics Inc. v. Kaufman, 669 F.2d 852 (2d Cir. 1982), is a legal case in which the United States Court of Appeals Second Circuit held that Omni Video Games violated the copyright and trademark of Scramble, an arcade game marketed by Stern Electronics. The lawsuit was due to a trend of "knock-off" video games in the early 1980s, leading to one of the earliest findings of copyright infringement for a video game, and the first federal appellate court to recognize a video game as a copyrighted audiovisual work.

Scramble was created by Japanese video game developer Konami in 1981, and marketed in the Americas by Stern Electronics. The game was first sold in the United States in March 1981, and became a breakthrough hit for Konami, reaching the top of the sales charts in June 1981, and becoming the first side-scrolling shooter game. A month after the debut of Konami's Scramble, Omni began marketing a nearly identical game with the same name on their arcade cabinets, leading Stern to sue Omni for copyright and trademark infringement. Omni counter-sued for trademark infringement, showing that they had ordered arcade nameplates for their version of Scramble in December 1980. Omni argued that they did not copy Konami's underlying code. Despite similarities in the audiovisual display, Omni also argued that Konami could not register any copyright in their game as an audiovisual work, as the display for a video game varies each time that it is played, and is not fixed.

The court rejected Omni's argument, saying that Scramble's audiovisual display was sufficiently fixed due to the repeated use of certain images and sounds. The court found that the games were nearly identical in their audiovisual display, and granted an injunction against Omni's game. This also led the court to reject Omni's trademark argument, since any use of the "Scramble" mark was made in bad faith, in anticipation of creating a knock-off game under the same name. The principle that a video game is copyrightable as an audiovisual work was affirmed in Atari v. Amusement World and Midway Manufacturing Co. v. Artic International, Inc., and followed parallel developments for computer software in Apple Computer, Inc. v. Franklin Computer Corp.

== Background ==
=== Facts ===
Screenshot of Konami's Scramble game

Konami was a Japanese jukebox repair company that began developing arcade games in the early 1980s. One of Konami's first titles was their game Scramble, a side-scrolling shooter in which the player pilots an aircraft and fires weapons at enemies. The player wins the game by completing six different levels, before running out of fuel or crashing into an obstacle. Scramble was first sold in the United States on March 17, 1981, distributed in North and South America by Stern Electronics, who secured an exclusive license from Konami.

As Konami's first breakthrough hit, Scramble was part of a wave of Konami titles that brought them success both in their native Japan and around the world. In the United States, Konami's Scramble sold 15,000 units, generating $20 million (equivalent to $71 million in 2025) in two months alone. The game topped the American RePlay arcade charts in June 1981, and became the 14th highest-grossing arcade video game of 1981 in Japan. The home adaptation for the Vectrex became one of the most popular cartridges on the console. Scramble is also credited with being the first game with distinct levels, and the first game that automatically scrolls the screen from left-to-right.

In November 1980, Stern Electronics sued Omni Video Games for violating their copyright over Astro Invaders, and Omni consented to a preliminary injunction to stop selling their virtually identical game called Zygon. During this time, Omni Video Games began developing an interchangeable arcade game machine to be marketed under the name "Scramble", and ordered several name plates for the machines in December 1980. Between that date and the first sale of Konami's Scramble game, Omni sold several arcade machines with the "Scramble" name on the headboard. One month after Stern introduced Scramble, Omni began marketing a visually similar game with the same title on the machine. Stern responded by suing Omni for violating their Scramble trademark as well as their copyright in the game, and Omni responded by suing Stern for violating their common law trademark rights for the mark "Scramble." By that time, Omni was marketing their product as Scramble 2, and had sold a total of five units.

=== Law ===
Before the Copyright Act was updated in 1985 to specifically include computer software, game developers typically looked for copyright protection by treating the code as a literary work. Since it is possible to produce the same sound and images with several different computer programs, Konami decided to register Scramble as an audiovisual work instead of a literary work. Stern sent a video tape recording of the game to the United States Copyright Office, to protect themselves from video game clones where an identical display is created using different computer code. When Stern accused Omni of violating their copyright, Omni responded that the audiovisual display is different for each player, and did not meet the fixation requirement for a valid copyright. Omni argued that Stern was only entitled to copyright protection in the written computer code stored in the machine's memory, a legal argument that had been successful in the past. Both parties claimed that they owned common law trademark rights to the word "Scramble", with Omni noting that they were the first ones to sell arcade machines bearing the mark.

== Ruling ==
The case was first argued in the United States District Court for the Eastern District of New York, with Stern as the plaintiff and Omni as the defendant. Omni had argued that the audiovisual display could not be copyrighted as it was created by a program, and not an author. The court rejected Omni's argument as "senseless", and noted that "an author's work does not become any less original after he has found a means to replicate it." The court further found that Omni's first use of the "Scramble" mark was not in good faith, and was solely in anticipation of imitating the audiovisual display of Stern's game. Based on Stern's considerable investment in Scramble and the large number of units already sold, the court determined that Stern was more likely to experience hardship, treating Omni's game as counterfeit. The court granted a preliminary injunction against Omni, preventing them from selling their game or using the "Scramble" mark.

Omni tried to appeal the injunction to the United States Court of Appeals Second Circuit, but Judge Jon O. Newman agreed with the district court's decision. Omni once again argued that Scramble does not meet the originality requirement for copyright, as the sequence of images was not an original work of a game developer, but an underlying computer program. Omni further argued that each play of the game produced a new, original audiovisual work, and was not a fixed work as required by copyright law. The appeal court rejected both these arguments. Despite the variations in each play through of the game, the audiovisual display was sufficiently fixed due to the repeated use of certain images and sounds. The court also found that there was originality in the creation of these images and sounds, and the audiovisual display was copyrightable, independent of copyright in the underlying code. The appellate court also agreed with the lower court's ruling that Omni's use of the "Scramble" mark was not in good faith, and that they did this anticipate both the debut of Stern's game and Omni's imitation. The preliminary injunction was affirmed, and Omni was stopped from selling their version of Scramble.

== Impact ==
Stern Electronics, Inc v. Kaufman was one of the first lawsuits prompted by the increase in "knock-off" video games in the early 1980s. The University of Pennsylvania Law Review has noted the ruling as one of the earliest and leading cases where the court found copyright infringement in a video game. Loyola of Los Angeles Entertainment Law Review also cites it as the first federal appellate court to conclude that a video game qualified for copyright as an audiovisual work. The decision also influenced case law for other types of computer software, granting copyright to the software's look-and-feel, separate from copyright in the underlying code. This case established that video games may qualify for multiple types of copyright protection at the same time – as audiovisual, graphical, and/or literary works – and corresponded with legal developments in computer software with Apple Computer, Inc. v. Franklin Computer Corp. By 1988, the trend of copyright jurisprudence expanded from "protect[ing] entertainment software involving fanciful creatures and characters to allowing this protection to extend to the user interface of productivity ... software containing little or no artistic or creative originality."

In the 1982 essay "The Adaptation of Copyright Law to Video Games", Thomas Hemnes noted that it is common "for defendants in video game cases to include in their pleadings the argument that 'the original work of authorship is the computer program' ... and not the game itself. This argument has been uniformly unsuccessful." Hemnes summarized the court's position on Scramble, that the audiovisual display is plainly original enough to be copyrightable, even though the underlying code exists independently and is itself eligible for copyright. Hemnes also summarized the efforts of defendants to say that video games lack the fixation to qualify for copyright, saying "this defense is also unavailing." The 1997 book Ownership of Rights in Audiovisual Productions explains how this case established that video games are audiovisual works, because the audiovisual data is fixed in "memory devices" that can be displayed via hardware. The principle that video games are fixed, audiovisual works would be affirmed in Atari v. Amusement World, as well as Williams Electronics v. Artic. The principle would continue through the decision Midway Manufacturing Co. v. Artic International, Inc., after which the U.S. Copyright Office asked copyright registrants to decide whether to register the display as an audiovisual work and the computer program as a literary work, not both. The University of Pennsylvania Law Review cites this as an early case that enforced the plaintiff's copyright protection, before limiting the scope of this protection in the cases that followed – a trend that continued until the 2013 copyright cases of Spry Fox v. Lolapps and Tetris Holding v. Xio Interactive.
