= Midway Manufacturing Co. v. Artic International, Inc. =

U.S. Court of Appeals case

- Court: United States Court of Appeals for the Seventh Circuit
- Full case name: Midway Manufacturing Co. v. Artic International, Inc.
- Argued: November 29, 1982
- Decided: April 11, 1983
- Citation: 704 F.2d 1009

Case history
- Prior history: 547 F. Supp. 999 (N.D. Ill. 1982)

Court membership
- Judges sitting: Walter J. Cummings Jr., Richard Posner, Luther Merritt Swygert

Case opinions
- Majority: Cummings, joined by a unanimous court

Midway Manufacturing Co. v. Artic International, Inc., 704 F.2d 1009 (7th Cir. 1983), was a legal case where the United States Court of Appeals for the Seventh Circuit found that Artic violated Midway's copyright in their arcade games Pac-Man and Galaxian. The lawsuit was part of a trend of "knock-off" video games in the early 1980s, with courts recognizing that a video game can qualify for protection as a copyrighted audiovisual work.

Both Galaxian and Pac-Man were bestselling games in the early 1980s, with Pac-Man generating over $1 billion in revenues, as well as sequels, merchandising, and a cartoon. The dispute arose when Artic began to distribute an alleged clone of Pac-Man, and a circuit board that could speed-up the gameplay of Galaxian. While Midway registered their copyrights as audiovisual works by submitting video recordings of their games being played, Artic argued that this did not protect the games themselves, as the game's graphics were not fixed like a conventional video. The district court disagreed, finding that both games were protected as audiovisual works, and enjoined Artic from distributing their infringing hardware. The decision was affirmed by the United States Court of Appeals for the Seventh Circuit.

The case was among several early decisions finding that video games qualify for copyright protection as audiovisual works, despite their graphics varying between game sessions. Since Artic's version of Pac-Man was nearly identical to Midway's, the real issue was whether Pac-Man qualified for protection as an audiovisual work, which it did. This helped establish that an unauthorized clone of a game will be considered a copyright violation. In finding that the Galaxian speed-up kit was a copyright violation, the decision also established that a copyright holder has the exclusive right to modify their game and produce derivative works. This issue was revisited in Lewis Galoob Toys, Inc. v. Nintendo of America, Inc., where courts found that it was not a copyright violation for the Game Genie to modify the gameplay of popular Nintendo games. The issue of derivative works has provoked further discussion from legal theorists, arguing whether Artic's modifications of Galaxian actually copied anything from the original game.

== Background ==
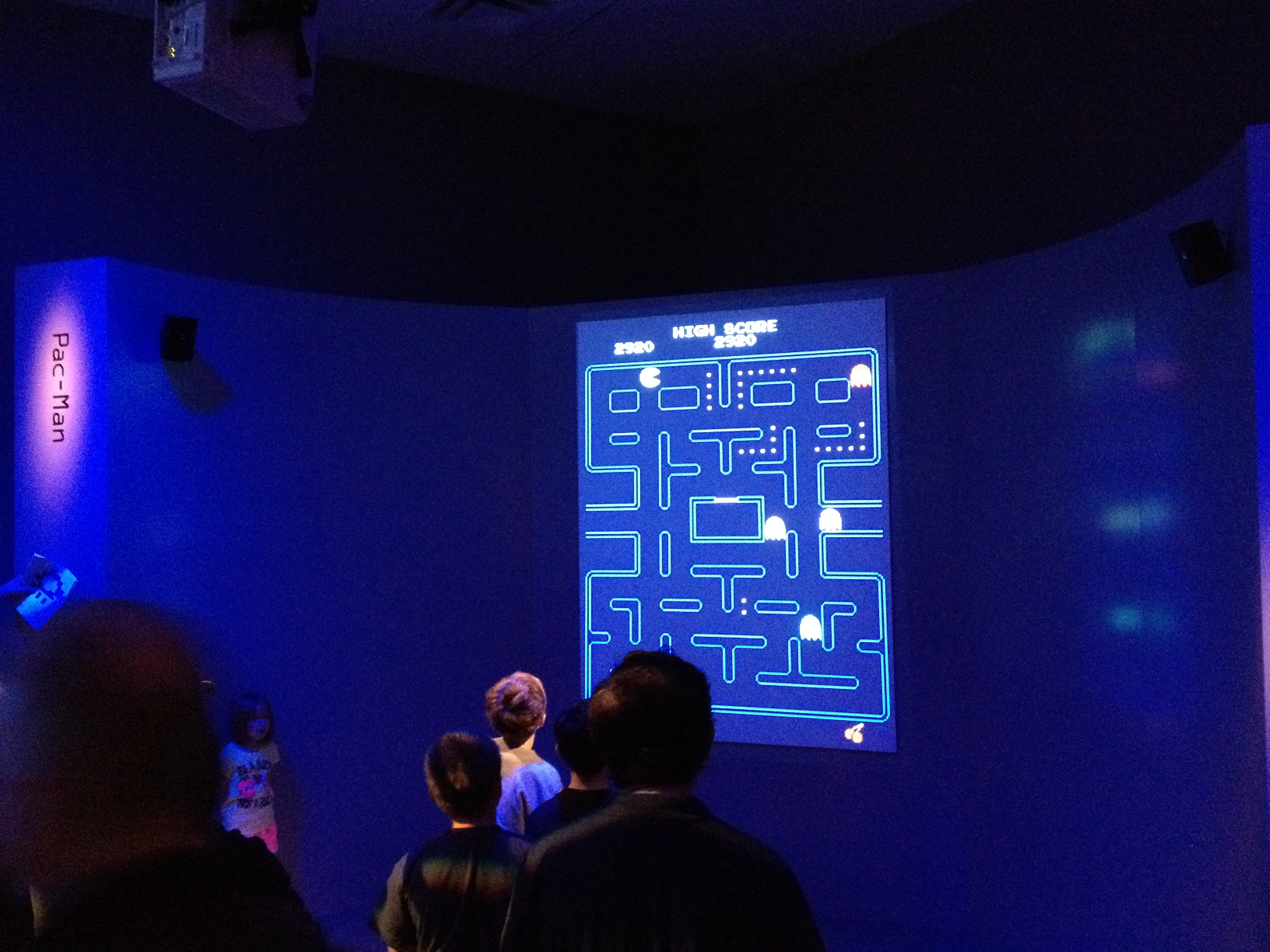
Pac-Man interactive exposition at The Art of Video Games

In the late 1970s, arcade game industry was growing in Japan, leading Namco to enter the market. In 1979, Namco published the hit video game Galaxian, one of the first arcade games to incorporate RGB color graphics, score bonuses, and a tile-based graphical layout. That year, Galaxian became the second highest-earning arcade game in Japan. It was re-released in North America by Midway Manufacturing, where it became one of its bestselling titles, and started a lucrative relationship between Namco and Midway.

Namco built on this success with the release of Pac-Man in 1980, which was once again licensed to Midway Manufacturing for a North American re-release. The year ended with Pac-Man as the highest earning game in Japan, with Galaxian close behind. The game generated $150 million in sales between October 1980 and December 1981, and overtook Atari's Asteroids as the bestselling arcade game in the United States in 1981. Pac-Man was also the U.S.' highest-grossing arcade game of 1981, eventually earning more than $1 billion in revenue, surpassing even the revenues of the film Star Wars: A New Hope. Pac-Man became a mass market success, leading to game sequels, merchandising, and a cartoon.

Artic International began selling circuit boards that could be used inside other game machines, including an alleged clone of Pac-Man, as well as a "speed-up kit" that accelerates the gameplay for Galaxian. Midway filed suit against Artic for copyright infringement in both games. Artic responded by filing a motion for summary judgment against Midway, on the basis that Midway did not hold a valid copyright, and that Artic had neither copied nor induced others to copy Midway's work. Although Midway registered their copyrights submitting video recordings of their games being played, Artic argued that the games themselves are transitory and not fixed.

== Ruling ==
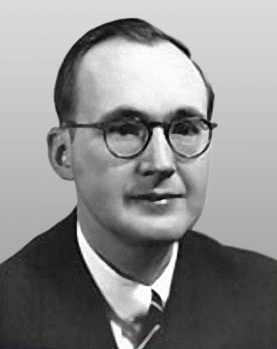
Chief Judge Walter J. Cummings Jr. affirmed the lower court decision, granting an injunction against Artic for copyright infringement.

District Judge Bernard Decker granted an injunction against Artic, denying their motion for summary judgement, and preventing them manufacturing or distributing circuit boards that infringed both Pac-Man and Galaxian. Artic appealed the injunction to the United States Court of Appeals for the Seventh Circuit, but Chief Judge Walter J. Cummings Jr. affirmed the lower court decision.

Artic argued that the games cannot be protected as audiovisual works as they are not fixed. The court acknowledged that the framers of the Copyright Act did not anticipate the issues raised by electronic games, but rejected Artic's arguments. According to the court, Midway's video games meet the Copyright Act's definition of an audiovisual work as a "series of related images", because there is sufficient repetition of images between playthroughs. The court also accepted that the inventor of the game was the creator of the audiovisual work, and not the player, thus allowing Midway to register the copyright.

Galaxian created further issues, as Artic argued that their hardware speeding the rate of play did not infringe Midway's copyright. However, the court held that Artic violated Midway's exclusive right to create derivative works of Galaxian, as Artic's speed-up kit incorporated copyrighted material from the game, and supplanted demand for Midway's game.

Having established that Midway owned a valid copyright in both games, the court found that Artic infringed Pac-Man by producing a near identical copy, and infringed Galaxian by creating an unauthorized derivative work. The court denied Artic's motion for summary judgement against Midway, and instead enjoined Artic from infringing Pac-Man and Galaxian.

== Impact ==
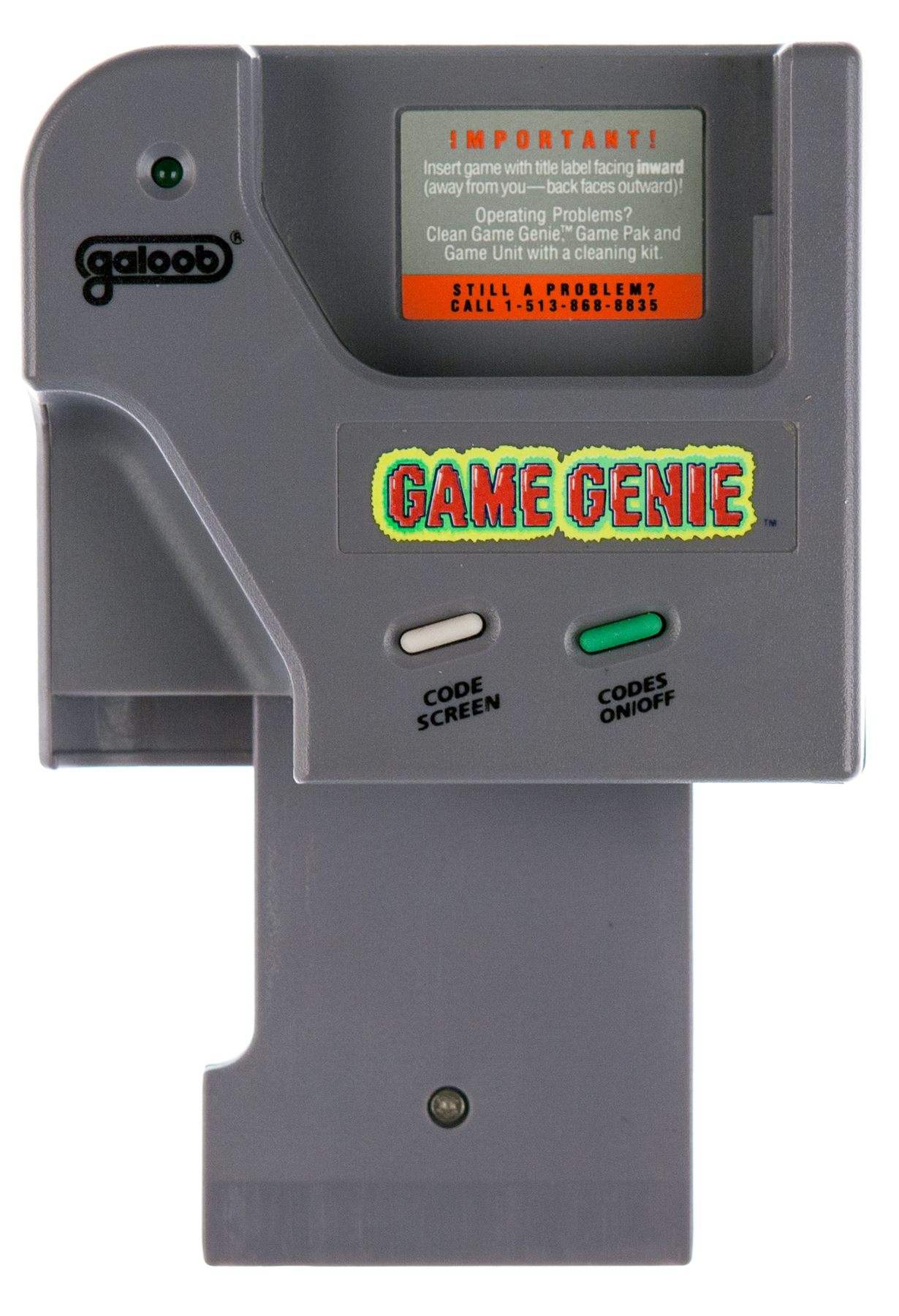
The holding in Midway was distinguished in Lewis Galoob Toys v. Nintendo of America, when the Game Genie raised the copyright issue of using external hardware to modify a game's output.

Midway v. Artic was one of several early video game lawsuits involving "knock-off" video games, along with Stern Electronics, Inc. v. Kaufman and Midway v. Dirkschneider. Since a knock-off involves strong evidence of copying, these cases depended on whether video games were eligible for copyright at all. Midway v. Artic helped establish that video games are indeed eligible for copyright protection as audiovisual works, and that a copyright holder can register a video game as an audiovisual work by submitting a video tape of gameplay. The judge's interpretation of Pac-Man helped establish that a near identical clone of a game will usually be considered copyright infringement. The decision was also notable for going beyond an ordinary observer test for similarity, relying on expert testimony to parse similarities in source code between the games, including an identical error in the two circuit boards.

This case also illustrates a challenge for understanding the concept of "fixation" in copyright law. Midway v. Artic is one of the first copyright decisions where a computer program stored in hardware memory was sufficient to qualify as a fixed creative work. Even though the combinations of images change between game sessions, most of the images are fixed in memory of the printed circuit boards. Along with early cases Stern Electronics, Inc. v. Kaufman and Atari, Inc. v. North American Philips Consumer Electronics Corp., courts accepted that the image sequences were the creations of the author, and not an algorithm or a player. In Play/Write, Scott Nelson argues that this has implications for copyright ownership in procedurally generated games such as Diablo, Dwarf Fortress, and Minecraft.

Midway v. Artic was also one of the first cases about using hardware to modify a copyrighted game, with Midway's exclusive right to prepare derivative works violated by Artic's speed-up kit. This interpretation was distinguished in 1992 with the ruling in Lewis Galoob Toys, Inc. v. Nintendo of America, Inc., where the court decided that there was no copyright infringement in attaching Game Genie hardware to a Nintendo cartridge to alter a game's mechanics. The legal distinction was that Artic's hardware incorporated a portion of the original Galaxian, while the Game Genie did not incorporate any copyrighted content. Another distinction was that the Galaxian speed-up kit was interpreted as a threat to the commercial demand for Galaxian, whereas another court found that the Game Genie would not have the same commercial impact. Thomas Hemnes criticized this opinion about commercial impact in the University of Pennsylvania Law Review, noting that the speed-up kit could not function without first owning a working version of the original game. Pamela Samuelson made a similar criticism in the Georgetown Law Journal, that the injunction against the speed-up kit may have hindered competition in the video game industry.
