= Breakout 2000 =

1996 video game

- Developer: MP Games
- Publisher: Telegames
- Producer: John Skruch
- Programmers: Mario Perdue; Richard Degler
- Artist: Gary T. Degler
- Composer: Douglas Perdue
- Series: Breakout
- Platform: Atari Jaguar
- Release: NA/EU: December 10, 1996
- Genre: Action
- Modes: Single-player, multiplayer

Breakout 2000 is a 1996 action video game developed by MP Games and published by Telegames for the Atari Jaguar. As part of Atari Corporation's 2000 series of arcade game revivals, it is a remake of the arcade game Breakout (1976), and one of the last officially licensed releases for the platform. Featuring a similar premise to Breakout, the player must destroy a layer of brick lines by repeatedly bouncing a ball spawned off a paddle into them and keep it in play. Gameplay modifications to the original game include a third-person perspective behind the paddle in a pseudo-3D playfield, power-ups, bonus levels, enemies, varying level designs, and multiplayer features.

Breakout 2000 was the first Jaguar project by MP Games, which had previously worked on productivity software for PC and WalZ, a Breakout-style game for Atari ST. Lead programmer Mario Perdue originally developed a Windows 3.1x version of WalZ, which went unreleased due to its similarity with Breakout and fear of lawsuit from Atari. He later approached Atari staffer Jay Patton, who recommended Mario working with the Jaguar hardware and loaned him a development kit for the system. Mario sent a copy of a 3D Breakout-style game for Windows called WalZ 3D to Atari staff, who liked the concept and asked Mario if he would be interested in completing the game as Breakout 2000, to which he agreed.

Upon release, Breakout 2000 received an average reception from critics. Reviewers praised its gameplay and multiplayer mode, with a mixed reception on the game's controls, and criticism directed towards the game's audiovisual presentation and slow pacing.

== Gameplay ==
Gameplay screenshot showing the first phase in the game's 2000 mode

Breakout 2000 is an action game featuring a similar premise to Breakout (1976), where the main objective is to destroy a layer of brick lines from the playfield by repeatedly bouncing a ball spawned off a paddle into them and keep it in play, using the walls and paddle to eliminate the bricks. The game is divided into two modes to choose from at the main menu (2000 and Classic), each with their own gameplay settings. As with previous arcade remakes and updates on the Atari Jaguar such as Tempest 2000, Missile Command 3D, and Defender 2000, the game modifies and builds upon the gameplay of its original counterpart, introducing a third-person perspective behind the paddle in a pseudo-3D playfield, power-ups, enemies, varying level designs, and multiplayer.

In the 2000 mode, the player must clear 50 levels, each divided into ten phases consisting of five rounds and one of two bonus rounds. The player has five balls to try clearing the playfield of bricks, each having a fixed point value depending on their color. The ball increases its speed at specific hit intervals and the paddle shrinks to half of its size if the ball touches the upper wall in a single-player session. During gameplay, power-ups are dropped by two of three types of drones that randomly appear on the playfield. These power-ups assist the player, ranging from speed increasers, multiplying the number of balls on-screen, equip the paddle with a plasma cannon, among others. The third drone type, Stingers, are enemies who shoot the paddle to break it if the player takes a determined number of hits. In two-player mode, the players' paddle are positioned at the bottom (1P) and top (2P) respectively, while the playfield's upper wall is replaced with a warped wall that allow the balls travel back and forth. The player can also enable a computer-controlled assistant for the second paddle.

Classic mode is a recreation of the original arcade game, where the player can choose between two gameplay options at the main menu before starting: "Catch" (where the paddle is capable of holding the ball) and "Breakthru" (where the ball breaks the bricks by moving through them). On each mode, failing in making the ball rebound from the paddle results in losing it and the game is over once all the balls are lost.

== Development ==
Breakout 2000 was the first Atari Jaguar project by MP Games, an Indiana-based developer initially established in 1991 under the name MP Graphics Systems. The company had previously worked on productivity software for PC like DynaCaDD for Ditek International as well as WalZ, a Breakout-style game for Atari ST based on Arkanoid (1986). It is part of Atari Corporation's 2000 series of arcade game revivals, a strategy initiated by producer John Skruch after the release of Tempest 2000. Mario Perdue, who previously worked on WalZ and projects for the ST and Atari TT030 computers, acted as lead programmer with Richard Degler providing additional programming. Gary T. Degler was responsible for the artwork and cover illustration, while the soundtrack was scored by Mario's son Douglas Perdue.

Mario originally programmed a Windows 3.1x version of WalZ, which was never released due to its similarity with Breakout and fear of lawsuit from Atari. He had health issues in the early 1990s but later recovered and approached Atari staffer Jay Patton, who recommended Mario to work with the Jaguar hardware and loaned him a development kit for the system. Mario submitted a copy of a 3D Breakout-style game for Windows called WalZ 3D to people within Atari, who liked the concept and asked Mario if he would be interested in completing the game as Breakout 2000, to which he agreed. The project was funded by Atari as a work-for-hire, and Mario was given complete freedom during development, with Patton and other Atari staffers such as Bill Rehbock and Mike Fulton contributing with possible ideas for implementation in the final version, such as the ball moving from one playfield to another.

Mario tried to make the classic mode as close to the original game as possible, while also focusing on making the 2000 mode playable with the Jaguar's controller but found it difficult. Mario stated that there were plans to include support for rotary controls, but were scrapped due to lack of them on the console. The game was completed in March 1996, before Atari suspended all new Jaguar releases and closed to merge with JTS, however Telegames president Terry Grantham contacted Mario and wanted to release it but lacked documentation. Mario agreed putting together a manual for Grantham in exchange for copies of the game, but forgot to credit Douglas for the music. Mario said he wished he could have made better decisions early in the design to make the gameplay smoother, but expressed his satisfaction with Breakout 2000 and has since considered it one of the most enjoyable experiences of his career.

== Release ==
Breakout 2000 was first previewed in 1995, being advertised with a September release date. It was covered by the press that were invited to Atari Corporation's European division, and was also showcased between 1995 and 1996 during Atari's "Fun 'n' Games Day", an event for producers and developers to showcase upcoming Jaguar titles to the media. Early previews prior to launch showed differences compared to the final version such as different visuals and heads-up display. The game was later scheduled for a November launch window, although internal documentation from Atari showed that it was still in development by December 11.

In 1996, Atari merged with JTS Corporation, ceasing production of the Atari Jaguar and games that were in development for the platform. This resulted in the game not being published by Atari despite being completed, rated by the ESRB, and scheduled for a July release. As part of the merger, Atari agreed to continue support for the Jaguar. Telegames later became involved with the game and sub-licensed it from Atari along with a number of titles for the console. By this time, Telegames was one of the last remaining third-party publishers for the Jaguar. Breakout 2000 was released in North America and Europe on December 10. Being a late release after the console was discontinued, it was only available through direct order from Telegames and retailers such as Electronics Boutique.

== Reception ==
Reception

Review scores
Publication	Score
Atari Gaming Headquarters	7/10
The Atari Times	85%
Jaguar Explorer Online	4/5
MyAtari	3/5
ST-Computer	75%
ST Magazine	75%

Breakout 2000 received an average reception from critics. Edge felt that the game's main mode provided little gameplay thrills compared with Arkanoid (1986). The Atari Times' Patrick Holstine labelled it as a well-done title, noting the challenging gameplay and adequate controls. However, Holstine found the graphical presentation "rather 16-bit looking". He also expressed mixed thoughts about the music and the classic mode. Marc Abramson of the French ST Magazine highlighted its visuals, sound, fluidity, and controls. Abramson also noted the multiplayer component for its originality but difficult in getting used to it due to the playfield's perspective, and lamented the lack of game save support. Red of German publication ST-Computer concurred with Abramson regarding the two-player mode, while commenting that the game's perspective was reminiscent of Klax. Red ultimately considered it a fun game, commending the gameplay, smooth animation, and controls, but felt that its audio "leaves a lot to be desired".

GamePro's Dan Amrich echoed a similar opinion in regards to the graphics and controls, but found the power-ups difficult to distinguish before grabbing them and criticized the audio department. Regardless, Amrich concluded that Breakout 2000 is a good title for two players that offers a broad-appeal fun. MyAtari's Robert Jung gave the game positive remarks for the inclusion of the original title and multiplayer mode. While Jung found its controls passable, he saw the slower pacing and uninspired audiovisual presentation as negative points. Atari Gaming Headquarters' Keita Iida regarded the game to be "a decent deviation from its predecessor", but faulted its controls for being sluggish in contrast to other reviewers. Author Andy Slaven agreed with Iida, writing that the Jaguar's pad cannot emulate the precise movement of a paddle, while also commenting that the pseudo-3D visuals failed to impress. Nils of the German website neXGam considered that the game's viewing perspective brought advantages to the level design, but also disadvantages in terms of its point of view.

== Legacy ==
After finishing development on Breakout 2000, Mario Perdue began work on three other games that were intended to be used on kiddie rides manufactured by Carousel Entertainment, using Jaguar consoles purchased from Atari as their control units across establishments such as K-Mart and Chuck E. Cheese: the racing game Speedster II, the helicopter-themed shoot 'em up Skycopter II, and a spaceship game titled SpaceGuy. According to Perdue, Speedster II was completed on December 5, 1996, while Skycopter II was completed shortly after but SpaceGuy was never released.

There are conflicting reports online regarding status of Speedster II and Skycopter II, with one source stating the rides were released to the public while another source state they were never released due to issues with the system's reliability on certain environments. In 2008, the source code of Breakout 2000 was released by hobbyist community Jaguar Sector II under a CD compilation called Jaguar Source Code Collection. In 2011, Beta Phase Games alongside GOAT Store acquired the rights to both Speedster II and Skycopter II, in addition of purchasing all of their remaining Jaguar-related inventory from Carousel Entertainment. In 2022, a prototype ROM image of Speedster II was leaked online.
