= Breakout (video game) =

1976 action video game

- North American arcade flyer
- Developer: Atari, Inc.
- Publishers: NA/EU: Atari, Inc.; JP: Namco
- Designers: Nolan Bushnell; Steve Bristow; Steve Wozniak
- Programmers: Steve Wozniak; Gary Waters; 2600; Brad Stewart
- Series: Breakout
- Platforms: Arcade, Atari 2600
- Release: Arcade: NA: May 13, 1976; JP: May 1976; EU: 1976; 2600: November 9, 1978
- Genre: Action
- Modes: Single-player, multiplayer

Breakout is a 1976 action video game developed and published by Atari, Inc. for arcades; in Japan, it was released by Namco. The game was designed by Nolan Bushnell and Steve Bristow and prototyped via discrete logic chips by Steve Wozniak with assistance from Steve Jobs. In the game, eight rows of bricks line the top portion of the screen, and the player's goal is to destroy the bricks by repeatedly bouncing a ball off a paddle into them. The concept was predated by Ramtek's Clean Sweep (1974), but the game's designers were influenced by Atari's own Pong (1972). The arcade version of Breakout uses a monochrome display underneath a translucent colored overlay.

The game was a commercial success. It was among the top five highest-grossing arcade video games of 1976 in the U.S. and Japan, and among the top three in both countries for 1977. A port of the game was published in 1978 for the Atari 2600 with color graphics. An arcade sequel was released in 1978, Super Breakout, which introduced multiple bouncing balls. Wozniak and Jobs subsequently founded the Apple Computer Company alongside Ronald Wayne. The company's Apple II computer, designed primarily by Wozniak, features hardware elements inspired by Breakout's logic design.

Atari was involved in the copyright lawsuit Atari Games Corp. v. Oman over its ability to register copyright protection for Breakout, ultimately prevailing in establishing that the game is copyrightable as an audiovisual work. The game spawned an entire genre of clone games. In Japan, the genre is known as block kuzushi ("block breaker") games. Breakout inspired Taito's Arkanoid (1986), which itself led to many imitators. It also influenced the game design of Taito's arcade shooter Space Invaders (1978).

== Gameplay ==
The start of a game, with all bricks intact (arcade version)

Breakout begins with eight rows of bricks, with two rows each of a different color. The color order from the bottom up is yellow, green, orange, and red. Using a single ball, the player must knock down as many bricks as possible by using the walls and the paddle below to bounce the ball against the bricks and eliminate them. If the player's paddle misses the ball's rebound, they lose a turn. The player has three turns to clear two screens of bricks. Yellow bricks earn one point each, green bricks earn three points, orange bricks earn five points, and the top-level red bricks score seven points each. The paddle shrinks to one-half its initial size after the ball breaks through the red row and makes contact with the upper wall. Ball speed increases at specific intervals: after four hits, after twelve hits, and after making contact with the orange and red rows.

The highest score achievable by one player in a single game is 896 points, attained by clearing two full screens worth 448 points each. Once the second screen of bricks is destroyed, no additional bricks are generated, and the ball bounces harmlessly off the walls until the player restarts the game. Because of how two-player mode manages internal screen memory, an additional scoring quirk exists: if a player completes the first screen on their final turn and the ball is subsequently lost, the cleared screen status transfers to the second player as an extra board, allowing a theoretical maximum score of 1,344 points before the game concludes.

The original arcade cabinet of Breakout features artwork framing the game's premise as a prison escape. The artwork depicts the player character as a prison inmate attempting to shatter a brick wall of their cell by hitting a ball and chain with a mallet. If the player successfully destroys the wall in-game, the inmate escapes with others following.

== Development ==
A precursor to Breakout was Clean Sweep, released by Ramtek in 1974. In that game, the player uses a paddle to hit a ball up towards a playfield of dots, which disappear as the ball moves through them; the goal is to achieve a clean sweep by erasing all the dots on screen. Clean Sweep became one of the top ten best-selling arcade video games of 1974 and sold a total of 3,500 arcade cabinets.

Breakout, a discrete logic (non-microprocessor) video game, was designed by Nolan Bushnell and Steve Bristow, both of whom were involved with Atari and its Kee Games subsidiary. Atari produced innovative video games using modified Pong hardware as a means of competition against companies manufacturing unlicensed "Pong clones". Bushnell wanted to adapt the gameplay of Pong into a single-player experience where the player uses a paddle to sustain a bouncing ball that depletes a wall of bricks. Bushnell was certain the game would be popular, and he and Bristow partnered to produce a concept. Al Alcorn was assigned as the Breakout project manager, and development began with Cyan Engineering in 1975. Bushnell assigned Steve Jobs, who was employed at Atari but was not an electrical engineer, to build a prototype. Jobs was offered US$750 for the task, supplemented by a bonus of $100 for every TTL (transistor-transistor logic) chip fewer than 50 used in the design. Jobs promised Bushnell that he would deliver a completed prototype within four days.

Bushnell offered the chip-reduction bonus because he disliked how contemporary Atari games routinely required between 150 and 170 chips on their printed circuit boards; he knew that Jobs' friend Steve Wozniak, an engineer at Hewlett-Packard, had previously designed a custom version of Pong that operated on approximately 30 chips. Jobs had little specialized knowledge of digital circuit board layout but knew Wozniak was skilled at drafting designs with low chip counts. He convinced Wozniak to collaborate with him, promising to split the entire fee evenly between them if Wozniak could successfully minimize the component count. Wozniak was given no formal schematic sketches and instead interpreted the game logic entirely from verbal descriptions. To economize on hardware parts, he implemented an array of customized circuit designs. Near the end of development, Wozniak contemplated positioning the high score display at the top of the monitor, but Jobs stated that Bushnell specifically wanted it at the bottom; Wozniak remained unaware of the truth of Jobs' claims. The four-day deadline was met after Wozniak worked at Atari for four consecutive nights, drafting additional schematic logic during his regular day job hours at Hewlett-Packard. His efficient hardware design resulted in a chip reduction bonus of $5,000, a reward that Jobs kept secret from Wozniak. Wozniak stated that he received a payment of just $350 for the work; he believed for years that Atari had promised only $700 for a layout using fewer than 50 chips, and $1,000 for fewer than 40, explicitly noting in a 1984 interview that "we only got 700 bucks for it". Throughout the endeavor, Wozniak served as the engineer, while Jobs functioned as the physical breadboarder and tester. Wozniak's initial schematic required 42 chips; the completed breadboard that he and Jobs submitted to Atari contained 44, with Wozniak noting: "We were so tired we couldn't cut it down".

The simplicity and abstract nature of the video game created legal complications when Atari's initial copyright registration filing was denied by the United States Copyright Office on the grounds that it "did not contain at least a minimum amount of original pictorial or graphic authorship, or authorship in sounds". Atari appealed the decision. In the appellate decision Atari Games Corp. v. Oman, then-Court of Appeals Judge Ruth Bader Ginsburg held that the work satisfied the legal standard for originality, affirming that Breakout was copyrightable.

Atari was ultimately unable to manufacture Wozniak's design for factory mass production. By designing the board with as few chips as possible, he created a compact layout that proved difficult to manufacture using Atari's standard assembly and testing methods. Wozniak, however, contends that Atari engineers failed to comprehend his optimization techniques, speculating that "maybe some engineer there was trying to make some kind of modification to it". Atari ended up developing its own version for factory production, which used approximately 100 TTL chips. Upon evaluating the final commercial machine, Wozniak found the gameplay and timing to be identical to his original creation.

The commercial arcade cabinet incorporates a monochrome black-and-white CRT monitor; however, manufacturers applied tinted strips of colored cellophane directly over the screen surface so that the rows of bricks appear in different colors.

== Ports ==
Atari 2600 version

A software adaptation of Breakout was programmed for the Atari 2600 video game console by Brad Stewart. The home version was published in November 1978; to accommodate hardware limits, it featured six rows of bricks rather than eight, and granted the player five turns instead of three to destroy two walls. The cartridge also introduced a "Breakthru" gameplay variant, in which the ball does not bounce off an impacted brick, but continues directly through the entire column until it impacts the boundary wall. Atari registered this term as a trademark and used it alongside Breakout to describe ball-and-paddle mechanics in look-alike games and remakes.

Atari's dedicated Video Pinball home console, released in 1977, also included a built-in adaptation of Breakout.

== Reception ==
In October 1976, the annual RePlay industry revenue chart listed Breakout as the fifth highest-earning arcade video game of 1976 in the United States, below Midway Manufacturing's Sea Wolf, Gun Fight, and Wheels, and Atari's own multi-player game Indy 800. Breakout was later the third highest-earning arcade video game of 1977 in the United States, trailing only Sea Wolf and Sprint 2, and remained the fifth highest-earning arcade video game of 1978 in the US. Throughout its original arcade production run, Atari manufactured a total of 11,000 dedicated cabinets.

Breakout was also a commercial success in Japan under its publishing partnership with Namco. On the first annual Game Machine arcade revenue chart, Breakout ranked as the fourth highest-grossing arcade video game of 1976 in Japan, behind Taito's Ball Park (Tornado Baseball) and Speed Race DX, and Sega's Heavyweight Champ. The following year, Breakout was Japan's third highest-grossing arcade game of 1977, behind two racing games: Namco's electro-mechanical driving game F-1 and Taito's Speed Race DX.

By 1981, lifetime global sales of dedicated Breakout arcade cabinets reached 15,000 units. In addition, an estimated 40,000 unofficial pirated arcade units were illegally sold by the Yakuza in Asia after they made a deal with Namco. This negatively impacted Atari's earnings from Asian markets, straining their partnership with Namco.

The home console conversion for the Atari 2600 sold 256,265 cartridges during 1980. By 1983, total cartridge sales for the Atari 2600 version reached 1,650,336 units.

In a 1989 retrospective evaluation of console games, UK gaming journal Computer and Video Games reviewed the Atari VCS version, giving it a 24% score.

In 2021, UK newspaper The Guardian ranked Breakout as the fourth greatest video game of the 1970s, placing it behind Galaxian, Asteroids, and Space Invaders.

== Legacy ==
Breakout spawned an extensive genre of clones. Ten years after its arcade release, the block-breaking concept gained renewed popularity with Taito's 1986 game Arkanoid, which introduced power-ups and distinct enemies and led to numerous imitators. In Japan, this genre became known as block kuzushi ("block breaker") games. Designer Tomohiro Nishikado cited Breakout as an inspiration behind his 1978 arcade shooting game Space Invaders. Nishikado stated that he wished to adapt the game's sense of pacing and achievement derived from destroying targets one by one into a defensive shooting game.

Breakout also influenced Wozniak's engineering design for the Apple II computer. Wozniak later remarked: "A lot of features of the Apple II went in because I had designed Breakout for Atari. I had designed it in hardware. I wanted to write it in software now." This led Wozniak to implement integrated color graphics circuitry, game paddle peripheral signaling, sound support, and native graphical command sets within Integer BASIC. Wozniak subsequently used these BASIC commands to program Brick Out, a software clone of his Atari hardware game. In 1984, Wozniak explained:

Basically, all the game features were put in just so I could show off the game I was familiar with—Breakout—at the Homebrew Computer Club. It was the most satisfying day of my life [when] I demonstrated Breakout—totally written in BASIC. It seemed like a huge step to me. After designing hardware arcade games, I knew that being able to program them in BASIC was going to change the world.

=== Re-releases and enhanced versions ===
The ongoing popularity of the arcade release led to an official sequel, Super Breakout, released in 1978. The sequel features three distinct game modes with multi-ball gameplay. Home ports of Super Breakout included the original Breakout as a fourth selectable mode, using the visual style of Super Breakout.

In 1996, Atari released Breakout 2000 for the Atari Jaguar, adding a 3D playfield alongside simultaneous multiplayer options and power-ups.

A 3D action adaptation of the game was published simply as Breakout in 2000 for Microsoft Windows and the PlayStation; the title was published by Hasbro Interactive under its licensed Atari Interactive brand label.

In 2011, Atari SA released an updated mobile adaptation titled Breakout Boost for iOS devices, featuring variable ball speeds and specialty brick types.

The 1976 arcade original and its Atari 2600 port have been regularly re-released via inclusion in classic Atari compilations. The game was featured in Atari Anniversary Edition (2001), Atari Anthology (2004), Atari Vault (2016), and numerous installments of the plug-and-play Atari Flashback console series. It was also included with archival material and commentary within the 50th-anniversary retrospective compilation, Atari 50: The Anniversary Celebration, in 2022.

A revamped version of the game titled Breakout: Recharged was released on February 10, 2022, for the Nintendo Switch, PlayStation 4, PlayStation 5, Xbox One, Xbox Series X/S, Microsoft Windows, and the Atari VCS as part of the Atari Recharged series. It was co-developed by Adamvision Studios and SneakyBox.

In anticipation of the game's 50th anniversary, Atari published Breakout Beyond on March 25, 2025, developed by Choice Provisions, for Nintendo Switch, PlayStation 4, PlayStation 5, Xbox One, Xbox Series X/S, Microsoft Windows, and the Atari VCS. The game reimagines the original with a horizontal perspective and introduces a combo system, power-ups, and a competitive multiplayer mode. A subsequent update in June 2025 added a TATE mode option, allowing players to rotate the display to the traditional vertical orientation.

=== In popular culture ===
Pilgrim in the Microworld is a 1983 autobiography written by David Sudnow detailing his personal fixation with mastering Breakout. Sudnow recounts studying the game's mechanics, visiting the manufacturer in Silicon Valley, and interviewing original Atari programmers.

First-generation models of Apple's iPod Classic feature a built-in Easter egg where holding down the center button for several seconds within the "About" menu summons a playable version of Breakout.

On May 14, 2013, celebrating the 37th anniversary of the game's release, Google embedded an interactive secret Easter egg in Google Images. Entering the query "atari breakout" caused the resulting image thumbnails to form rows of Breakout bricks, summoning a ball and paddle to begin a playable game.
