= Fixation in Canadian copyright law =

Fixation in Canadian copyright law is a threshold consideration that must be used in copyright infringement cases by courts to determine if copyright actually exists.

In Canada, a work "must be expressed to some extent at least in some material form, capable of identification and having a more or less permanent endurance" to be subject to copyright protection. Fixation is not a statutory requirement in Canada and the rationale for its use in court has been the subject of much scrutiny.

== Case law ==
In Canadian Admiral Corp. v. Rediffusion Inc., [1954] 20 C.P.R. 75, the plaintiffs had purchased the exclusive right to live telecasts of football matches played by the Montreal Alouettes. Rediffusion Inc., the defendant, had taken those live telecasts and re-transmitted them to its own subscribers without license or permission. Canadian Admiral alleged copyright over the live telecasts and this was the central issue in the case.

The court found that in order for copyright to apply, there must be "something definite and ascertainable to protect". Mere spoken words, not reduced to a definite ascertainable form which can be referred to at any time is not sufficient to create copyright. Rather, a work "must be expressed to some extent at least in some material form, capable of identification and having a more or less permanent endurance." Thus, in the case of musical or dramatic works, musical notation or a script, would be respective examples of the requisite fixation.

In contrast, live telecasts lack any tangibility or permanence. Rather, images are captured on the field and transmitted to viewers as a television signal. The signal itself is constantly changing. While the plaintiff had argued that the process was analogous to a cinematographic production or photograph (both being subject to copyright), the court rejected this argument. Films and photographs produce something of a material form of more or less permanent endurance, that is, a negative of the image (or series of images).

Note:

- There is no copyright in the match itself. Broadcasting rights (the right Canadian Admiral Corp obtained) is grounded in real property (as opposed to intellectual property) concepts. The right purchased by the broadcaster is a right of access to the venue and to record what is happening.
- There is no dispute that a recorded match would be subject to copyright. It is only whether there is copyright in the live telecasts.
- Originality of the work is not contested in this case. The telecasts are not subject to copyright because they are not fixed.

== Fixation in the Copyright Act ==
Under the Canadian Copyright Act (R.S., 1985, c.C-42), there is no definition for fixation nor is it required that every work be "fixed".

Under s.3(1)(1.1), however, any literary, dramatic, musical or artistic work, communicated by telecommunication, "is fixed even if it is fixed simultaneously with its communication." This provision partially overrules the outcome in Canadian Admiral Corp. v Rediffusion Inc. Today, a live broadcast that is being simultaneously recorded, is protected by copyright. The definition of fixation within Canadian Admiral Corp. v Rediffusion Inc., remains the valid.

Under Part II, Performers' Rights, fixation is also addressed. The performer retains certain rights to reproductions of his/her performance depending on whether the performance was fixed or not. If the performance is not fixed, the performer has the sole right to communicate it to the public by telecommunication, to perform it in public (where it is communicated to the public by telecommunication otherwise than by communication signal), and to fix it in any material form.

== Comparison to the US ==
Alongside originality, fixation must also be satisfied in order to be protected by copyright. Fixation, in the United States, is defined and required as per Title 17 of the United States Code. As per 17 U.S.C. §101, fixation takes place in a work, "when its embodiment in a copy or phonorecord is sufficiently permanent or stable to permit it to be perceived, reproduced or otherwise communicated for a period of more than transitory duration." This definition is largely similar to the view taken in Canadian Admiral Corp v Diffusion Inc., though fixation in the US only requires the lower standard of "transitory duration" for copyrightable work whereas in Canada, fixation has been articulated as "more or less permanent endurance."

In USA, in order to qualify for the copyright protection, a work must be fixed in a tangible medium of expression. In the White-Smith Music Publishing Company v. Apollo Company, the court defined the "copy" as a "material object in which a work is fixed and from which the work can be perceived, reproduced, or otherwise communicated, either directly or with the aid of a machine or device. Further, in the Midway Manufacturing Co. v. Artic International, Inc., the court held that the law does not require work to be written down in the exact way that it is perceived by the human senses (eyes).

According to William F. Patry, fixation in the United States is intended to serve two purposes. It lowers the burden of proof and forms the dividing line between common law protection and the federal Copyright Act protection.

The method by which fixation takes place may vary depending on the subject matter of the copyrighted work. Meeting the requirement of fixation can be more difficult in certain types of works.

Even in works that appear to be original, fixation may not be self-evident. In Kelley v. Chicago Park District, the author, Chapman Kelley, sought to enforce moral rights in his wildflower display at a public park in downtown Chicago. Kelley utilized the landscape and flowers to create large outdoor displays from 1983 to 1985. In order to claim relief, Kelley claimed copyright in the ‘living landscape art’. The requirement of fixation was one of the points where his case failed. The court was of the opinion that the living garden was not fixed in the form as necessary to enjoy copyright protection. The elements that constituted the garden were found to be ‘alive’, ‘inherently changeable’ and therefore ‘not fixed’. The court also noted that in this instance, it was very difficult to determine at what point fixation had occurred.

Demonstrating fixation can also be crucial in showing infringement. A work may be infringed by the creation of copies in violation of §106 of the United States Copyright Statute. It must be shown that infringing works are in a 'fixed' form constituting copies. As per 17 USC §101, in the case of both 'copies' and 'phonorecords', they are 'materials in which a work can be fixed by any method now known or later developed'. Owing to the use of the term 'transitory duration', the minimal threshold for duration has been the subject to instances of litigation in the United States. Cartoon Network, LP v. CSC Holdings, Inc. is a prime example. This litigation involved the a cable network provider known as 'Cablevision' which offered a remote storage DVR technology for their viewers. It differed from ordinary DVR services in that instead of storing the content in the personal drive of the subscriber, the content was stored remotely at Cablevision's facilities. At multiple stages, the content was buffered in such a manner that programming content was held in the buffers for periods o.1 and 1.2 seconds at a time. The Circuit Court decision held that on account of the buffer period the duration requirement was not satisfied as the reproduction was only for a transitory duration.

In the case of sound recordings, fixation actually determines the scope of rights. According to 17 USC §114(b), the exclusive right of the copyright owner is restricted to duplication of the 'actual sound fixed in the recording' and this goes for the right to create derivative works as well. This excludes the imitation or simulation of the sounds in the copyrighted recording.

In some cases, the fixation of the work may not be relevant to a claim of infringement. 17 U.S. Code §106 gives the copyright owner the exclusive right to prepare derivative works based on the copyrighted work. However, no requirement of fixation appears in the definitions of derivative works under 17 USC §101.

Apart from this, fixation in the United States is relevant to the law on live performances as well. The law provides remedies in case of an unauthorized fixation in the sound or images of the live performance in a phonorecord or copy.

== Fixation in material form under Indian copyright regime ==
Copyright is the protection from unauthorized use of author's original creative expression. For the purpose of copyright protection, the work concerned has to be Original work of authorship and Fixed in material form. A work is fixed in a tangible medium of expression when it's written down, recorded, or otherwise made permanent so that it can be perceived and reproduced by others. Berne Convention provides that the copyright subsists in literary and artistic works “whatever may be the mode or form of its expression” allowing each signatory to determine whether it will require fixation “in some material form.”

Indian regime follows the fundamental rule of copyright law, laid down in Article 9(2) of TRIPS and Article 2 of WCT, 1996, that copyright does not subsist in ideas and only protects original expression of the ideas. The requirement of fixation in material form is a precondition for copyright to subsist in a work. Generally, in the common law countries, the principle of fixation in copyright law is followed.

For subsistence of copyright in a literary, dramatic or musical work, the UK Act makes recording, in writing or otherwise, a precondition whereas the Indian Act does not have such a qualifying clause for literary or other works for copyright subsistence in them. This leaves ground for exploring the possibility of copyright protection for original and oral literary and dramatic pieces.

However, in the case of musical works, in India, the condition of fixation in a medium has been done away since 1994 as can be deduced from the amended definition of ‘musical work’ compared to the pre-amended one. This amendment finds its genesis in Justice Krishna Iyer’s observation that the earlier provision was an “un-Indian feature.”

The rationale of principle of fixation is the requirement of certainty as to what the work is. Another reason for it is to define the limits of copyright so that it does not extend to ideas or underlying information and its ability to be used as an evidence. Fixation need not be permanent but may be temporary or transient. To illustrate, the original extempore speech is protected as a literary work, provided some record of it is maintained. In that respect, the copyright would be owned by the person making the speech and not by the person who records it.

== Fixation and infringement ==
To reproduce a copyrighted work in any material form without the consent of the copyright owner constitutes an infringement. Thus, an infringing copy must be in a "material form".

Material form has been interpreted to mean "palpable, tangible, perceptible" and not merely ephemeral. Yet in 2009, the Copyright Board of Canada concluded that 4-6 second buffer of copyrighted material stored on the RAM of satellite receivers satisfied the material form requirement of a reproduction despite being imperceptible to the user. That the user could potentially retrieve a more permanent ephemeral copy was noted. Thus, ephemeral copies (including streaming, caching and temporary downloads) are considered to be in material form.

On appeal to the Federal Court of Appeal, however, the material form issue was not addressed and it could still be argued that such temporary copies such as those held on RAM do not meet such a requirement. It is odd to consider, for instance, how "material form" has been construed from being something "capable of identification and having more or less permanent endurance" in Canadian Admiral to something "ephemeral" and incapable of being perceived in the Satellite Radio decision. In addition, it could be argued that section 30.71 in Bill C-11 will address temporary reproduction for technological process, exempting reproduction of work or other subject-matter if the reproduction forms an essential part of a technological process. This would be in line with a supreme court decision where caches on an IP server were found to be copies made purely for technical reasons (to improve efficiency and utility) and therefore fell within a copyright exemption for telecommunication providers.

== Rationales and considerations ==
Fixation, as a requirement for copyrightability, is capable of supporting different objectives:

- Administration: having something to refer to makes it easier to determine whether copyright subsists and whether it has been infringed.
- The Idea vs Fact Dichotomy: tangible forms make it easier to separate underlying ideas from the expression of those ideas.
- Notice: material forms make it easier to identify what may be subject to copyright, allowing others to avoid infringement.
- Reducing Opportunism: without material forms, baseless allegations of copyright can abound.
- Non-Casualness: fixed forms are formalised, raising the threshold as to whether something should be protected.
- Incentive to Codify Knowledge: fixed forms lend themselves better to preservation, transmission and dissemination.

Under these rationales, it can be seen how the requirement of fixation lends some certainty to the law. Passing conversations, for instance, would otherwise automatically qualify for copyright protection. Fixation can also be easily understood when the nature of the work itself, implies a material form: a photograph or painting, for example. On the other hand, fixation can be a slippery concept, particularly because it is not statutory required under the Canadian Copyright Act (R.S., 1985, c.C-42). Rather, one can argue that the Act specifically refers to works being protected "whatever may be the mode or form of its expression." Thus, speeches, lectures and the like, fit well within this broad definition. The implication being that fixation is not a universal requirement.

Another issue with fixation becomes evident when we consider that works are often subject to revision and constant update. In the case of an electronic database where the data changes by the minute, for example, how can the system be considered "fixed"? Other poignant examples include performances that are improvised or interactive art (such as immersive theatre). In these cases, fixation appears to be making a value distinction between what kinds of artistic works are worthy of protection.

Rigidly requiring fixation reduces the reach of copyright by restricting the number and kinds of work to which copyright can offer protection. This favours the public interest in the sharing and dissemination of information at the expense of the creator or author receiving a just reward. In the US, this tipping of the scales in favour of the public interest sits well with the general approach to copyright protection, the aim of which is constitutionally mandated as the "Progress of Science and Arts". In Canada, however, there is no constitutional guidance on how to balance the competing interests of the public with those of the creator or author. In CCH Canadian Ltd. v. Law Society of Upper Canada [2004] SCJ No.12, the Supreme Court of Canada emphasized taking the "middle way" between US and UK copyright law on the question of originality. Even if this "middle way" approach was adopted with regards to fixation, rejecting the US requirement for fixation as one extreme, it remains unclear what this would be mean in actual practice - rather, it may well be the case that "the whole concept of fixation requires rethinking."
