= Micro Star v. FormGen Inc. =

1998 American court case on copyright

- Court: United States Court of Appeals, Ninth Circuit
- Full case name: MICRO STAR v. FORMGEN INC., a corporation; GT Interactive Software Corp.; 3D Realms Entertainment, aka 3D Realms Entertainment.
- Argued: November 4 1997
- Decided: September 11 1998
- Citation: 154 F.3d 1107

Case history
- Prior actions: Micro Star v. FormGen Inc., No. CV 96-3435 H(CM) (C.D. Cal. September 30, 1996)

Holding
- Micro Star infringed FormGen's copyright by creating unauthorized derivative works which were not a fair use

Court membership
- Judges sitting: Alex Kozinski, David R. Thompson, Stephen S. Trott

Case opinions
- Majority: Alex Kozinski

Laws applied
- 17 U.S.C. § 103,§ 106, § 107

Micro Star v. FormGen Inc. 154 F.3d 1107 (9th Cir. 1998) is a legal case applying copyright law to video games, stopping the sales of a compilation of user-generated levels that infringed the copyright of Duke Nukem 3D. Micro Star downloaded the Duke Nukem 3D levels and re-packaged them as Nuke It, after seeing their popularity on the internet. Micro Star filed suit in the United States District Court for the Southern District of California, asking for declaratory judgment that they had not infringed any copyright. Game publisher FormGen counter-sued, claiming that Micro Star created a derivative work based on Duke Nukem 3D and infringed their copyright.

At the time, the most relevant case law was Lewis Galoob Toys, Inc. v. Nintendo of America, Inc. (1992), where the court found that the Game Genie did not infringe Nintendo's copyrights, because the device did not store any modified images in any concrete or permanent form. The district court found that Micro Star had likely infringed copyright with their packaging, which included artwork from Duke Nukem 3D, but found that the levels themselves were non-infringing. Both parties appealed the ruling, and the appeal court held decisively against Micro Star. Copyright law gives the copyright holder the exclusive right to make sequels to their work, and the court found that the stories told in the Nuke It map files are "surely sequels, telling new tales of Duke's fabulous adventures".

The ruling continues to apply to the legal status of video game modding, with mods viewed as derivative works that require the consent of the copyright holder. While this may legally limit the creation of mods, machinima, broadcasts, or even cheats, many game developers have authorized and encouraged some of these activities.

== Background ==
=== Facts ===
Apogee is a video game developer responsible for creating the Duke Nukem series of computer games. The game studio developed Duke Nukem 3D under their new name 3D Realms, with support from software publisher FormGen. Released in 1996, Duke Nukem 3D was acclaimed as one of the best video games of all time by PC Gamer. The game also included a tool that allowed players to create their own levels using the game's graphics and gameplay. This was part of a growing trend of games that allowed user-generated video game modifications, with FormGen encouraging Duke Nukem players to share their creations on the growing Internet.

The popularity of these levels was noticed by Micro Star, a computer software distributor, which downloaded 300 levels and mass produced them on CD-ROM for commercial sale. The compilation Nuke It was adorned with screen shots of the levels created for Duke Nukem 3D.

=== Law ===
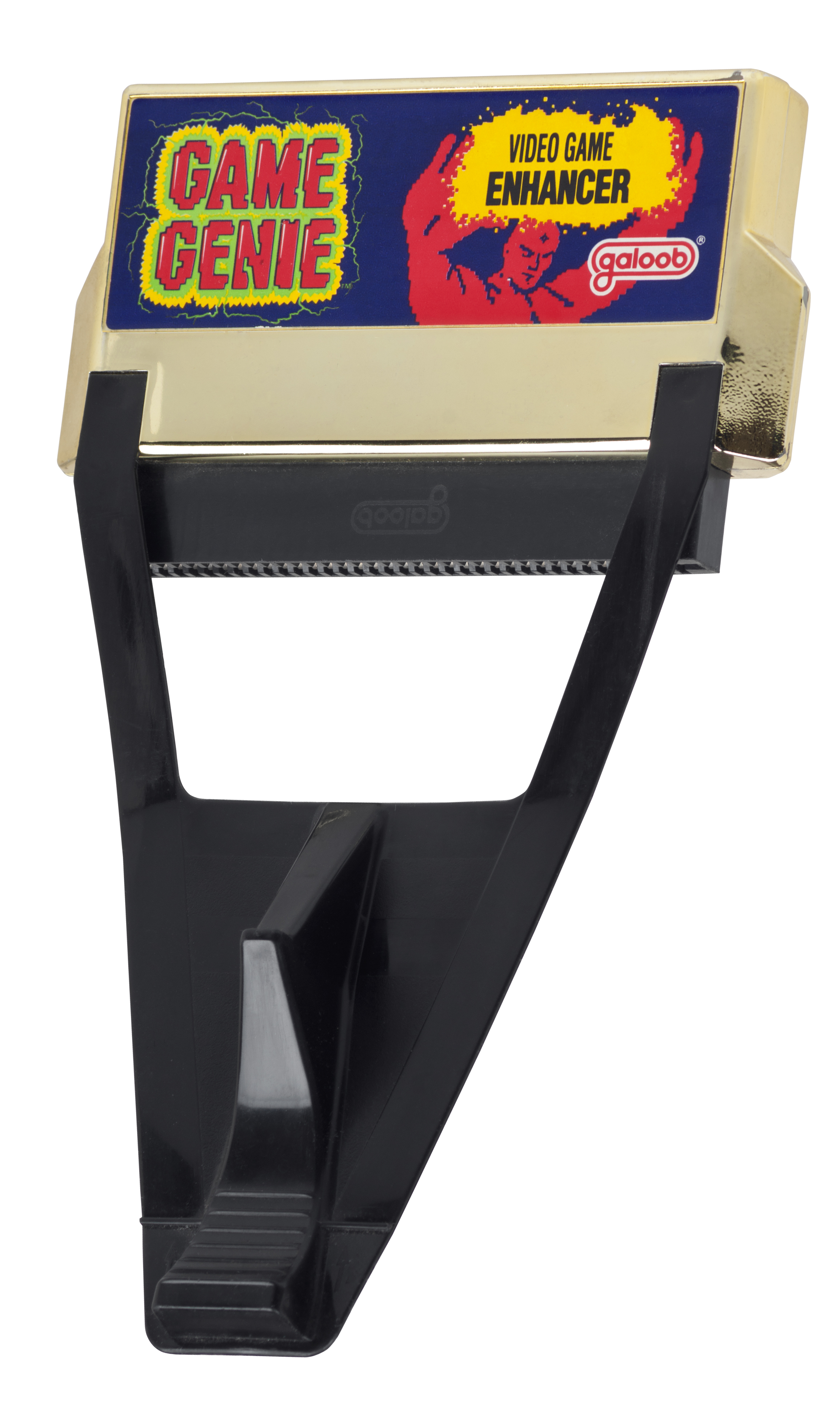
In the case Lewis Galoob Toys, Inc. v. Nintendo of America, Inc., the court found that the Game Genie did not infringe copyright, because it did not store any Nintendo images in any permanent form.

According to United States copyright law, the copyright holder has the exclusive right to create derivative works based on the original work. Micro Star filed suit in the United States District Court for the Southern District of California, asking for a declaratory judgment that they had not committed copyright infringement. FormGen counter-sued, claiming that Micro Star infringed their copyright by making derivative works of Duke Nukem 3D.

At issue was the legal precedent from Lewis Galoob Toys, Inc. v. Nintendo of America, Inc. (1992), where the court found that the Game Genie did not infringe Nintendo's copyrights, because the device did not store any modified images in any concrete or permanent form. Micro Star cited the case to show that their map files did not contain any of FormGen's copyrighted content, as they only referenced the art files in Duke Nukem 3D, without creating a permanent derivative work.

Micro Star also argued that the players had created the map files as non-commercial fair use, or alternatively, that FormGen abandoned their copyright to the user-created levels by authorizing users to create them. Under the fair use doctrine, copying a copyrighted work is sometimes allowed in the public interest, depending on four factors: (1) the purpose and character of the use, including whether it is commercial in nature; (2) the nature of the copyrighted work; (3) the amount and substantiality of the copied material in relation to the copyrighted work as a whole; and (4) the effect of the use on the potential market for the copyrighted work.

== Ruling ==
=== District Court ===
The district court granted a preliminary injunction against MicroStar, preventing them from using the screenshots from Duke Nukem 3D on their packaging, and rejecting Micro Star's argument that these images qualified as fair use. However, the district court considered the precedent from Galoob v. Nintendo, and found that Nuke It was not a derivative work and did not violate FormGen's copyright. Both sides filed appeals with United States Court of Appeals for the Ninth Circuit.

=== Appeal Court ===
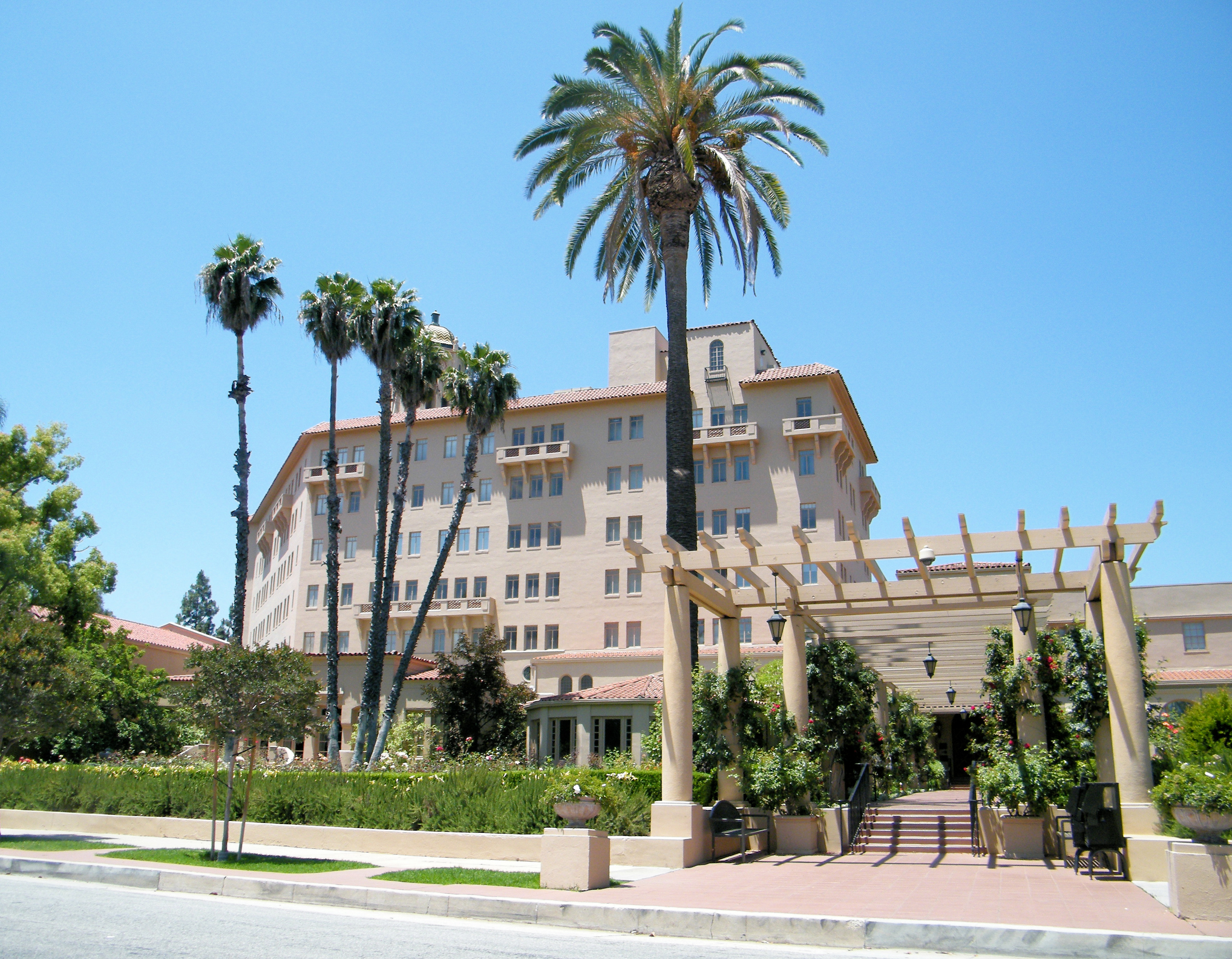
The Richard H. Chambers United States Court of Appeals, which houses the United States Court of Appeals for the Ninth Circuit

The appeal decision was written by Judge Alex Kozinski. Citing the precedent in Galoob v. Nintendo, the court narrowed the definition of a derivative work to two main requirements: that the derivative work must exist in a concrete and permanent form, and that it must substantially incorporate protected material from the original work. In this case, the Nuke It map files generated audiovisual displays in interaction with the Duke Nukem 3D game, and the court concluded that the description of an audiovisual display counts as a permanent or concrete form. This clearly applied to Nuke It as these descriptions were stored in a file on a compact disc. On the second requirement, the court concluded that Nuke It did not incorporate protected artwork of Duke Nukem 3D, since the map files only referred to that art, but rather incorporated the copyrighted characters and story. Copyright law gives the copyright holder the exclusive right to make sequels to their work, and the court found that the stories told in the Nuke It map files are "surely sequels, telling new tales of Duke's fabulous adventures".

After finding that Nuke It was indeed a derivative work based upon Duke Nukem 3D, the court went on to consider Micro Star's fair use argument. Micro Star asked the court to examine fair use from the user's point of view, but the court refused. Considering all of the fair use factors, the court found that Micro Star made heavy use of the FormGen's copyrighted game in terms of both quantity and importance, allowing Micro Star to profit from this use while also harming the market for sequels to Duke Nukem 3D. The court also rejected Micro Star's argument that FormGen abandoned all rights to their protected expression in Duke Nukem 3D, saying that this could only be done through an overt act.

The court reversed the district court's order denying a preliminary injunction on distributing Nuke It, concluding that FormGen would likely succeed in a claim against Micro Star for copyright infringement. The court also affirmed the district court's preliminary injunction preventing Micro Star from using Duke Nukem 3D screenshots on their packaging.

== Outcome ==
FormGen's parent company, GT Interactive, reacted with support for user-generated levels, while also stating that "the commercial exploitation of player-created levels is a clear violation of the Duke Nukem 3D copyright". The court distinguished the facts in Micro Star v. FormGen from those of the Game Genie case in Galoob v. Nintendo, because the Duke Nukem 3D mods were recorded in permanent files. Law professors Ron and Elizabeth Gard summarized that the ruling treated the user generated maps as non-copyrightable derivative works, even though the map files did not contain the original game's code. Attorney Ross Dannenberg also noted that the Duke Nukem maps were found to be infringing derivative works because they incorporated elements of the original game's art and story.

The impact of the case was overshadowed by the Digital Millennium Copyright Act that also passed in 1998, which prohibited anyone from circumventing technological access controls for copyrighted works. Alessandra Garbagnati in the Hastings Communications and Entertainment Law Journal argues that the FormGen case limited the rights previously afforded to consumers in Galoob, and these rights were further narrowed by the Digital Millennium Copyright Act.

== Legacy ==
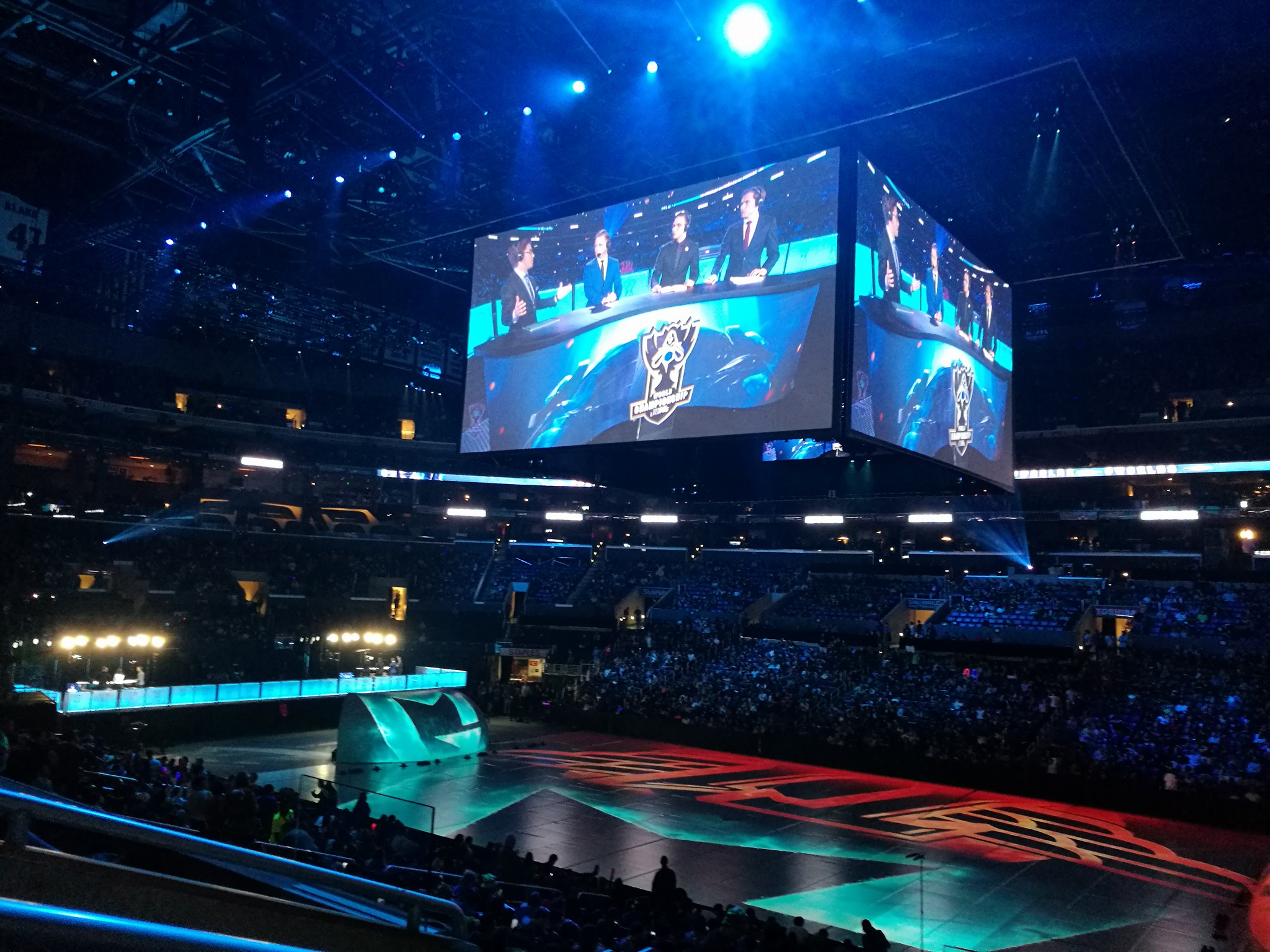
The Micro Star decision may apply to any derivative work based on a copyrighted video game, including mods, machinima, and even live broadcasts of esports, pictured above.

Legal scholars have highlighted Micro Star v. FormGen as a pivotal legal holding on the issue of unauthorized derivative works, including mods and other user-generated content. Writing for the William & Mary Business Law Review in 2020, Carl Lindstrom states that "Micro Star v. FormGen's holding still remains the final word on the legal status of mods, even when created using developer-furnished tools." Melinda Schlinsog in the Tulane Journal of Technology and Intellectual Property also noted Microstar v. FormGen could apply to all video game mods, though the Galoob v. Nintendo precedent may still protect mods that are non-commercial in nature.

J. Remy Green wrote for the North Carolina Journal of Law & Technology, discussing whether awarding more rights to modders would discourage original games, or encourage more derivative works. While Microstar determined that "mods are viewed as derivative works and are, therefore, violations of the copyright holder’s rights if made without the copyright holder’s consent," the BYU Law Review praised the video game industry for allowing and encouraging mods for popular video games.

In the Journal of Intellectual Property Law, Matthew Freedman cautioned that the case could affect the legality of machinima, where artists use copyrighted video game assets to produce animated films. Dan Burk in the University of Pennsylvania Law Review also cautioned that Microstar may apply to make esports broadcasts an infringing activity, as the copyright of each game belongs to its creators. Since the court interpreted the Nuke It map files distributed by Micro Star to be sequels, this ruling is also noted for showing that video game copyright owners have the exclusive right to make sequels. The Verge discussed whether it would infringe copyright if a player uses a video game mod to cheat, and noted that Microstar v. FormGen is unclear about whether any video game mods are permissible fair use. Regardless, Zvi Rosen in the Chicago-Kent Journal of Intellectual Property notes that many game developers have openly supported the creation of game modifications, and that the "relationship of mods to the computer game industry has shifted," even if "the law's view of mods has not".
