= Lewis Galoob Toys, Inc. v. Nintendo of America, Inc. =

1992 American court case on copyright

- Court: United States Court of Appeals for the Ninth Circuit
- Full case name: Lewis Galoob Toys, Inc. v. Nintendo of America, Inc.
- Decided: May 21, 1992
- Citation: 964 F.2d 965

Case history
- Prior action: 780 F. Supp. 1283 (N.D. Cal. 1991) (granting judgment for Galoob following two-week bench trial)
- Subsequent actions: cert. denied, 507 U.S. 985, 113 S. Ct. 1582, 123 L. Ed. 2d 149 (1993)

Court membership
- Judges sitting: Jerome Farris, Pamela Ann Rymer, and David V. Kenyon

Case opinions
- Manufacturer of product that allowed users to alter codes transmitted between video gaming console and game cartridge did not infringe console manufacturer's exclusive right, under federal copyright law, to create derivative works.

Lewis Galoob Toys, Inc. v. Nintendo of America, Inc. is a 1992 legal case where the United States Court of Appeals for the Ninth Circuit concluded that there was no copyright infringement made by the Game Genie, a video game accessory that allowed users to alter codes transmitted between game cartridges and the Nintendo Entertainment System, known informally as a cheat cartridge. The court determined that the Game Genie did not violate Nintendo's exclusive right to make derivative works of their games, because the Game Genie did not create a new permanent work. The court also found that the alterations produced by the Game Genie qualified as non-commercial fair use, and none of the alterations were supplanting demand for Nintendo's games.

U.K. video game developer Codemasters created the Game Genie to capitalize on the success of the Nintendo Entertainment System, reverse engineering the hardware to produce a device that could attach to Nintendo game cartridges. Anticipating legal challenges, the Game Genie's U.S. distributor, Galoob, preemptively sued Nintendo in May 1990 to prevent the company from blocking sales. Nintendo countered with a lawsuit seeking a preliminary injunction, which initially halted Game Genie sales. However, when the case went to trial, Galoob prevailed, not only securing the right to sell the device but also winning US$15 million (equivalent to $34.4 million in 2025) in damages. Nintendo appealed the decision but was ultimately unsuccessful.

The Game Genie sold millions of units, and the product line was extended with versions for other consoles. The case was cited in another copyright dispute from the same time, with Sega v. Accolade (1992) further establishing that reverse engineering is fair use. The case has also been cited for establishing the rights of users to modify copyrighted works for their own use, but the holding was distinguished by courts in Micro Star v. FormGen Inc. (1998), finding copyright infringement when making permanent modifications and distributing them to the public.

== Background ==
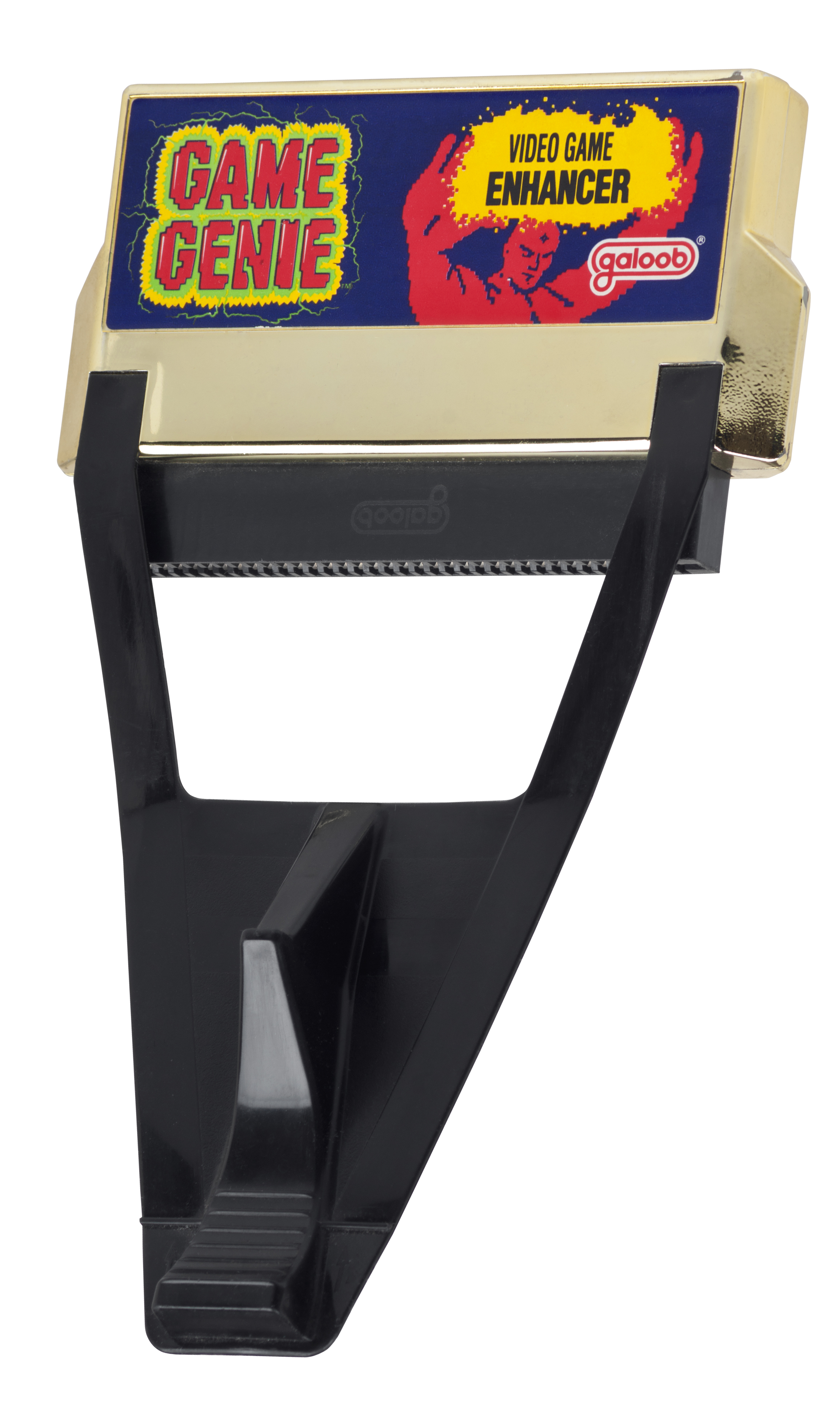
The Game Genie could be attached to a Nintendo game cartridge to intercept and transform its data.

The Family Computer (Famicom) is a Nintendo game console first released in Japan in 1983, followed by its North American debut as the Nintendo Entertainment System (NES) in 1985. By the early 1990s, the console had become so popular that the market for Nintendo cartridges was larger than that for all home computer software. The console had over 500 games created by more than 60 companies, each with a legal license to produce compatible game cartridges. By design, these cartridges were difficult for unauthorized third-parties to alter or reverse engineer. Each cartridge was manufactured with read-only memory hardware, including a 10NES chip that prevented unauthorized games from booting on the Nintendo console. This was designed to discourage counterfeit games.

In the late 1980s, a UK developer called Codemasters became interested in producing games for the NES. At a Consumer Electronics Show in Las Vegas, Codemasters founder David Darling tried to approach Nintendo's representatives, but they would not engage without an official appointment. Darling interpreted this as a "cold shoulder", and the company became determined to create an unauthorized development kit for the NES, starting by reverse engineering the console and cracking Nintendo's security measures. This allowed Codemasters to port their game Treasure Island Dizzy (1989) to the NES, and also allowed them to engineer a knob on the cartridge that could adjust the number of lives for the player character.

These discoveries led them to develop the Game Genie, a device that attached to NES game cartridges to modify each game. The device functioned by intercepting data from a Nintendo game cartridge, and replacing it with new data based on player input, before projecting the final result onto a TV screen. In most cases, players could use the device to make an NES game easier to win. For example, a player could give themself unlimited lives, or make themselves invincible, or start at a later level, but the device also allowed more creative modifications, such as changing the player character into another sprite, or even accessing unused or unfinished parts of the game.

After securing distribution in Canada through Camerica, Codemasters also presented the Game Genie to Galoob, an American toy manufacturer. When Lewis Galoob's son first encountered the device, he became fascinated by the Game Genie's ability to make Mario jump higher. Galoob agreed to distribute the Game Genie in North America, and Codemasters acquired every NES game available, so that they could discover and document the various "codes" that would alter the game's output. The Game Genie was announced in May 1990, and was set to launch in July.

== Legal dispute ==
Knowing that Nintendo would be unhappy with the Game Genie, Codemasters and Galoob initiated a lawsuit on May 17, 1990, against Nintendo in the United States District Court for the Northern District of California, seeking a declaratory judgment that the Game Genie did not violate Nintendo's copyrights. Galoob also asked the court for an injunction to stop Nintendo from interfering with the Game Genie's sales.

Nintendo responded with a counterclaim against Galoob, asking for an injunction of their own to prohibit sales of the Game Genie. Nintendo argued that the Game Genie violated their intellectual property, infringing on their exclusive right to make derivative works of their copyrighted games. Nintendo also alleged that Galoob contributed to infringement by encouraging their customers to make unauthorized derivative works using the Game Genie. Nintendo's reasoning relied heavily on the decision in Midway Manufacturing Co. v. Artic International (1983), where the court stopped Artic from selling hardware that could speed up the arcade game, Galaxian. In Midway, the judge concluded that Artic's speed-up kit incorporated copyrighted material from the game, and supplanted demand for Midway's game. By contrast, although the Game Genie altered the game's output and player experience, it did not alter the original cartridge in any way.

=== Injunction and decision ===
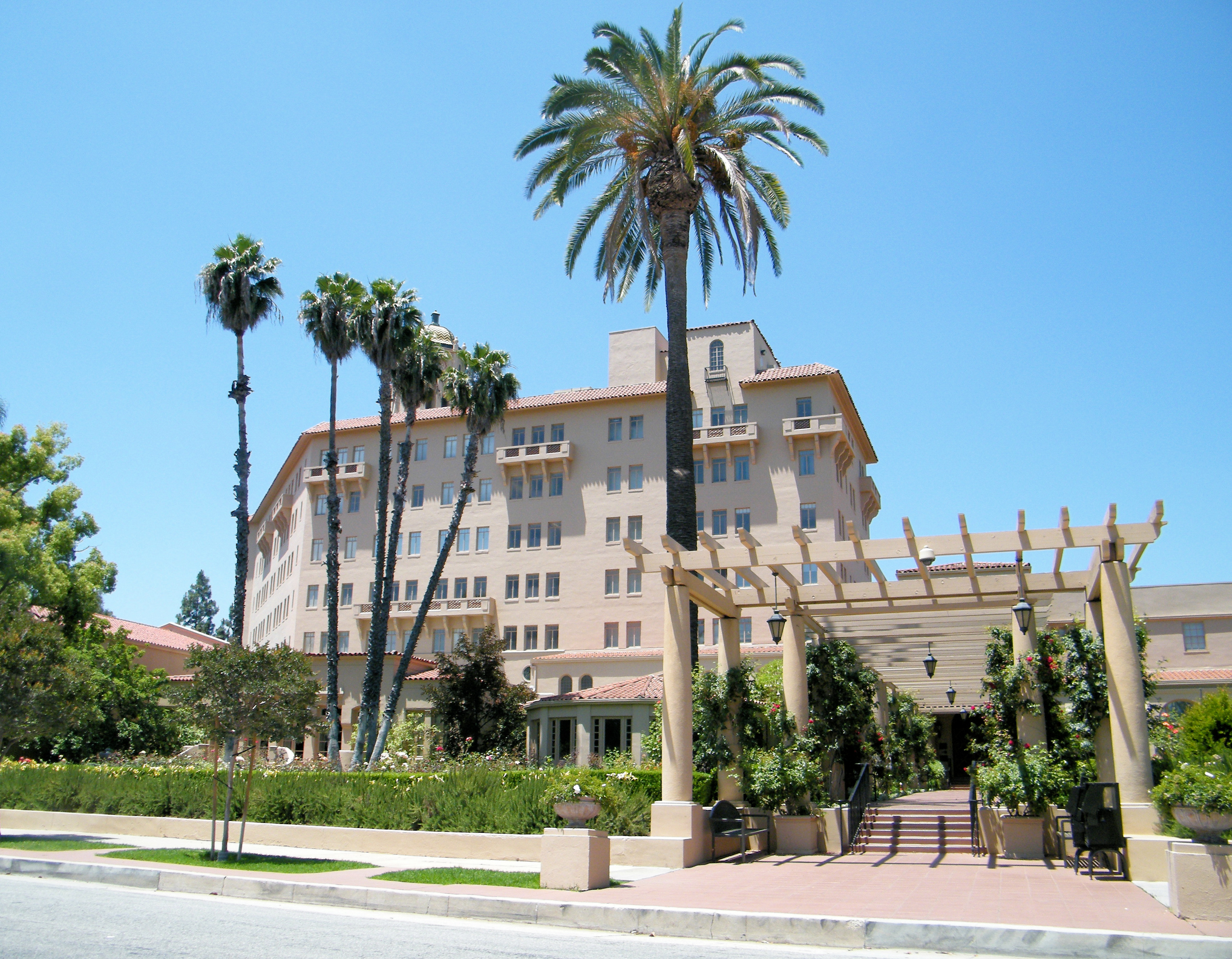
The Richard H. Chambers United States Court of Appeals, which houses the United States Court of Appeals for the Ninth Circuit

On July 2, 1990, District Judge Robert Howard Schnacke granted Nintendo a preliminary injunction, preventing Galoob from selling the Game Genie until the dispute was fully resolved. It also ordered Nintendo to post a bond (initially $100,000, later increased to $15 million), in order to ensure Galoob be compensated for sales lost during the injunction, should Galoob win the case. Galoob appealed the injunction, but the Ninth Circuit Court of Appeals affirmed the lower court's decision on February 7, 1991, and the dispute would proceed to trial in April.

A similar lawsuit launched by Nintendo in November 1990 against Camerica in Canada seeking an interlocutory injunction was dismissed by the Federal Court of Canada's Trial Division in February 1991. The court's Appeal Division upheld the decision on May 24, 1991.

On July 12, 1991, District Judge Fern M. Smith ruled that Galoob had not violated Nintendo's copyrights. In her ruling, Smith compared usage of the Game Genie to "skipping portions of a book" or fast-forwarding through a purchased movie. She also compared use of the Game Genie to altering a copyrighted board game for personal use; Nintendo conceded that this would be allowed under copyright. In determining that use of the Game Genie was non-infringing, Smith wrote that "having paid Nintendo a fair return, the consumer may experiment with the product and create new variations of play, for personal enjoyment, without creating a derivative work". She also ruled in the alternative, that it would still fall under fair use and was not infringing. The decision lifted the injunction on Galoob that had been in place for just over a year. Months later in December, a hearing was held to determine how much of the $15 million bond would be awarded to Galoob to compensate for losses during the approximately one-year period they were prohibited from selling the Game Genie. Partly using extrapolated sales data from Canada, the court found that because Galoob's losses actually exceeded $15 million, it was entitled to the entire amount, plus legal fees.

Nintendo appealed the verdict to the Ninth Circuit Court of Appeals, but the appellate court affirmed the lower court's decision on May 21, 1992. The appeals court ruled that the changes created by the Game Genie were not "fixed" in any permanent way, and thus no derivative work was created. A derivative work must incorporate a protected work in some concrete or permanent form, which is not the case for the audiovisual images produced by the Game Genie. The court also considered the doctrine of fair use, emphasizing the fourth factor of the fair use test where the court analyzes the effect of the alleged infringement on the value of the original work. The court stated that even if the Game Genie did allow players to create a derivative work, those players were doing this as a nonprofit activity, and Nintendo failed to show any economic harm from use of the Game Genie. The Game Genie did not supplant demand for Nintendo's games, as consumers would need to purchase the original game in order to use the add-on. The court concluded that Galoob had not directly infringed Nintendo's copyright, nor contributed to any infringing activity from Game Genie users. After the verdict, Nintendo tried to appeal the $15 million award in damages, but on February 17, 1994, the Ninth Circuit affirmed the district court's decision once again.

== Impact and legacy ==
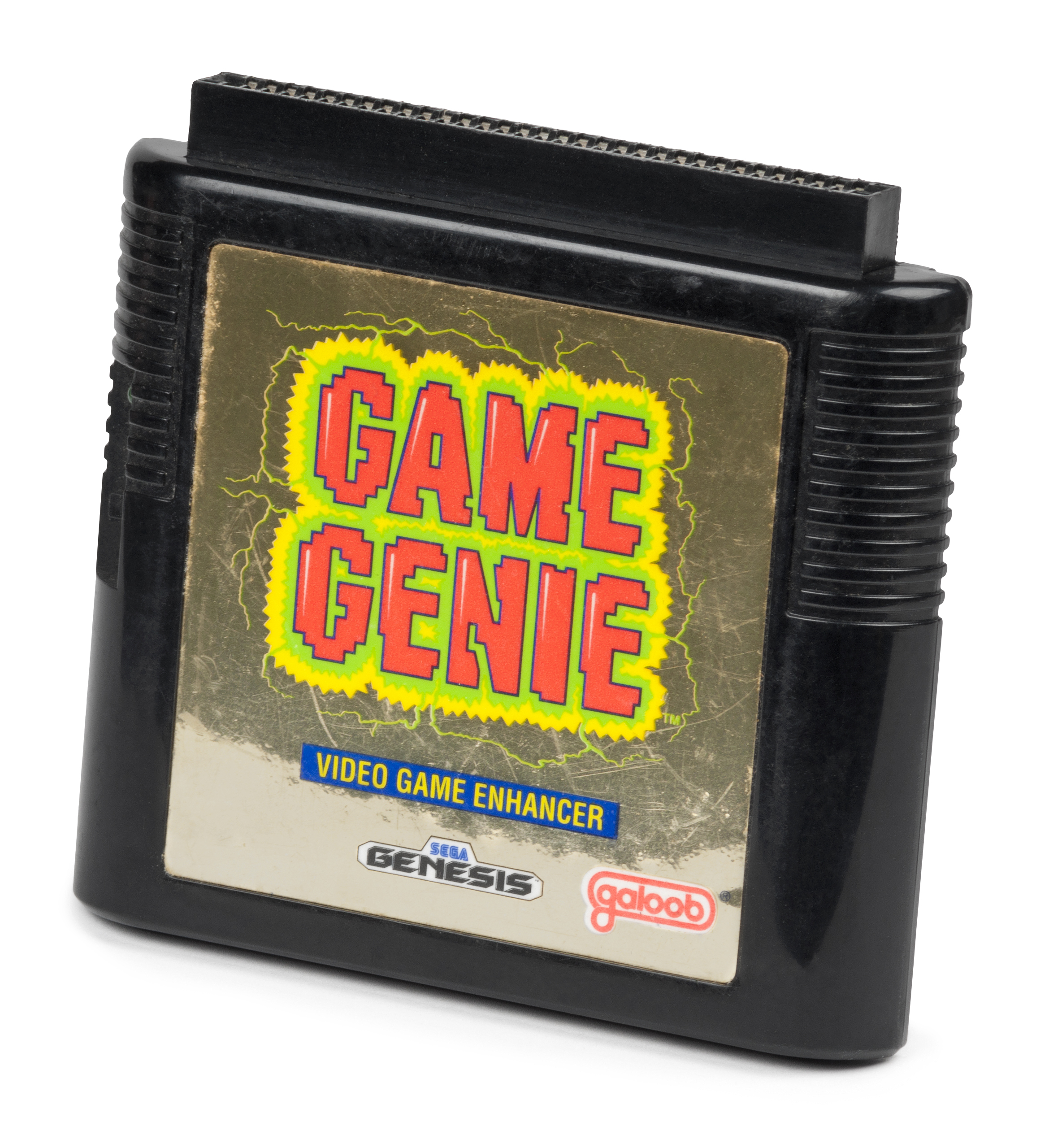
Codemasters became confident that the Game Genie did not infringe copyright, and began selling a version for the Sega Genesis, after threatening Sega with a lawsuit.

After the dispute was resolved in favor of Codemasters, it cleared the way for third party accessories that enabled cheating and modification, including a Game Genie model for the Nintendo Game Boy. Codemasters became confident of the legality of the Game Genie, as well as its commercial potential. Sega also came to an agreement with Codemasters to sell an official Game Genie device for the Sega Genesis, but only after Codemasters privately issued an ultimatum and promised to "open [the] floodgates" through a lawsuit, according to Codemasters developer Richard Alpin.

The Game Genie was considered non-infringing for two major reasons: that it did not create a new permanent work, and that Nintendo did not prove they experienced any present or potential market harm. In the Handbook of Intellectual Property Claims and Remedies, the author Patrick J. Flinn argued that Nintendo failed to take into account a fair use analysis, and that there was no real evidence that the Game Genie hurt their business.

Galoob v Nintendo signaled a change in the legality of third party game products of all kinds. In the same year, the case was cited in Sega v. Accolade (1992), which held that there was no copyright infringement when Accolade reverse engineered the Sega Genesis to publish third party games without Sega's authorization. The Hastings Communication and Entertainment Law Journal reacted to both cases, comparing the court's interpretations of both derivative works and fair use, and concluded that courts were shifting to allow more interoperability between technologies. The Journal of Intellectual Property Law compared both the Sega and Galoob cases to the earlier fair use case in Sony Corp. of America v. Universal City Studios (1984), concluding that a new technology shouldn't trigger copyright liability as long as it doesn't undermine a copyright owner's ability to earn a fair return for their works. The Golden Gate University Law Review praised the Galoob court for following fair use doctrine and refining the definition of a derivative work, allowing new innovations without jeopardizing the incentive to innovate. The Galoob decision continues to influence legal discussions of fair use of copyrighted video game content, such as how to apply the principle of permanency to a live stream or Let's Play.

By deterring companies from being overly litigious, the case was essential to the future of video game modding in the United States and globally. Soon after the court decided Galoob, video game mods became more widespread, particularly with the popularity of Doom and the permissive attitude of its developer, Id Software. As third parties began to sell compilations of user-created levels, Micro Star created Nuke-It, a compilation of 300 custom made levels for Duke Nukem 3D, provoking a copyright dispute with the game's developers. In the ensuing lawsuit Micro Star v. FormGen (1998), Judge Alex Kozinski distinguished the infringement of Micro Star's compilation from the non-infringing Game Genie, because the Nuke-It compilation was a permanent derivative work, and it was misappropriating profits from a potential Duke Nukem sequel. The Santa Clara High Technology Law Journal compared the Micro Star and Galoob cases, arguing that it is not inherently copyright infringement to modify a game, unless that modification is saved as a copy and distributed to the public. Since modern mods are distributed to the public in a permanent form, the William & Mary Business Law Review called the Galoob decision a "pyrrhic victory" for modders.

The question of whether a modification creates a new derivative work arose outside of the game industry in 2001, when television networks and studios sued SONICblue over the commercial-skipping feature of their digital video service, ReplayTV. However, SONICblue filed for bankruptcy, and its new ownership agreed to remove the commercial-skipping feature before courts could decide how Galoob applied. This issue also arose with the proliferation of "clean" edits of films, particularly a 2003 dispute involving ClearPlay technology that performed this filtering in real-time. The dispute became moot with the passage of the Family Entertainment and Copyright Act of 2005, which expressly permitted digital filtering, without changing the application of copyright law to cut-and-splice film edits.

The copyright cases of Midway, Galoob, and Micro Star continue to guide the law around game modifications, that a permanent modification is likely copyright infringement, where an impermanent modification is not. The Galoob precedent has led courts to permit the use of third-party software to manipulate and cheat at other games. This was later addressed in the Digital Millennium Copyright Act (1998), which limited people from creating technology that is "primarily designed or produced for the purpose of circumventing a technological measure that effectively controls access" to a protected work.
