= Zbots =

Action figures made by Galoob

Micro Machines Zbots
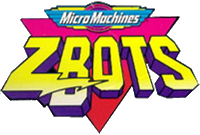
- Type: Mini action figures
- Invented by: Galoob
- Company: Galoob
- Country: United States
- Availability: 1992–94
- Materials: Plastic
- Features: ZBots
- Slogan: "Designed to Defend!"

Micro Machines Zbots (or Z-Bots) are small action figures that were made by Galoob and first released in 1992 as part of its Micro Machines line of products. Galoob released four series of Zbots from 1992 to 1994, also creating a number of Zbot vehicles alongside the figures.

The heroes were the ZBots (Designed to Defend!). The villains were the Voids (Made to Menace!). Each side has their own logo, usually imprinted on each robot's torso, although some do not have a visible logo. The Z-Bots' logo is a "Z", while the Voids' is a stylized "V".

Each Zbot design came in two different color sets, each listed as an individual character. Additionally, the Zbots often outnumbered the Voids two to one. Generally, the packages came with three of the figures each, with either two Voids and a Zbot, or two Zbots and a Void.

== Backstory ==
The original story behind the Zbots was that they were invented in 2025 by a group of scientists to protect the world from evil. However, almost sixty years later, a group of rival scientists stole the technology and built rival machines. The current war, according to the description, is taking place in the 22nd century.

The later Vortexx HQ and Fang Fighter playsets developed it further, by giving the scientist who created the Zbots a name and making a computer virus the real reason the Voids exist, making them robots who used to be Zbots but had their circuitry corrupted.

== Varieties ==
Some of the Z-Bots & Voids, called Morphbots, have the ability to transform. There were some, called Bitebots, which could "bite" simply opening their large mouths, often the size of their body. Some had wheels which gave them the ability to roll. There were also sets of Z-Bots & Voids that combined to make even larger bots. They were called Linkbots. Their names even combined into one. Baz, Oo, and Ka, for example, became Bazooka.

There was even a series of military-themed robots called Combots. Often the same model with different paint jobs was used as both a Void and Z-bot. There were also 1/2 inch tall Z-Bots called Mini Z's. These Z's had interchangeable parts. Some Z-Bots had motors that made them go faster simply by scooting them along the floor. These were called Revbots. There were even giant Z-Bots that acted as playsets. There were many accessories including spaceships.

In 1994, Burger King had a promotion where Kids Meals came with Z-Bots. KFC also had a promotion.
