= Lewis Galoob =

American businessman

- Born: November 22, 1918; Oklahoma City, Oklahoma, U.S.
- Died: August 4, 1971 (aged 52); San Francisco, California, U.S.
- Occupation: Businessman
- Known for: Lewis Galoob Toys
- Spouse: Barbara Galoob
- Children: 3

Lewis Galoob (November 22, 1918 – August 4, 1971) was an American entrepreneur, inventor and the founder of Lewis Galoob Toys.

== Early life ==
Lewis Galoob was born in Oklahoma City, Oklahoma, on November 22, 1918, as the third-youngest of seven children. His parents, Samuel "Sam" Galoob (1883-1973) and Sarah Leah Galoob (née Tarbis, 1887-1935), were both of Jewish descent, and originally from Russia and Germany respectively. He was married to his wife Barbara for 25 years.

== Career ==
In 1954, Galoob founded Lewis Galoob Toys with his wife, originally as an import business. The California-based company later became a toy and stationery distributor. Later, after Lewis Galoob fell ill, the leadership of the Galoob business fell to their son, waterbed salesman David Galoob. The company then grew into one of the U.S. leading toy companies before being acquired by Hasbro in 1999. Galoob's most successful products include Micro Machines and Game Genie.

== Death ==
Galoob died in San Francisco on August 4, 1971.
