= Speedeez =

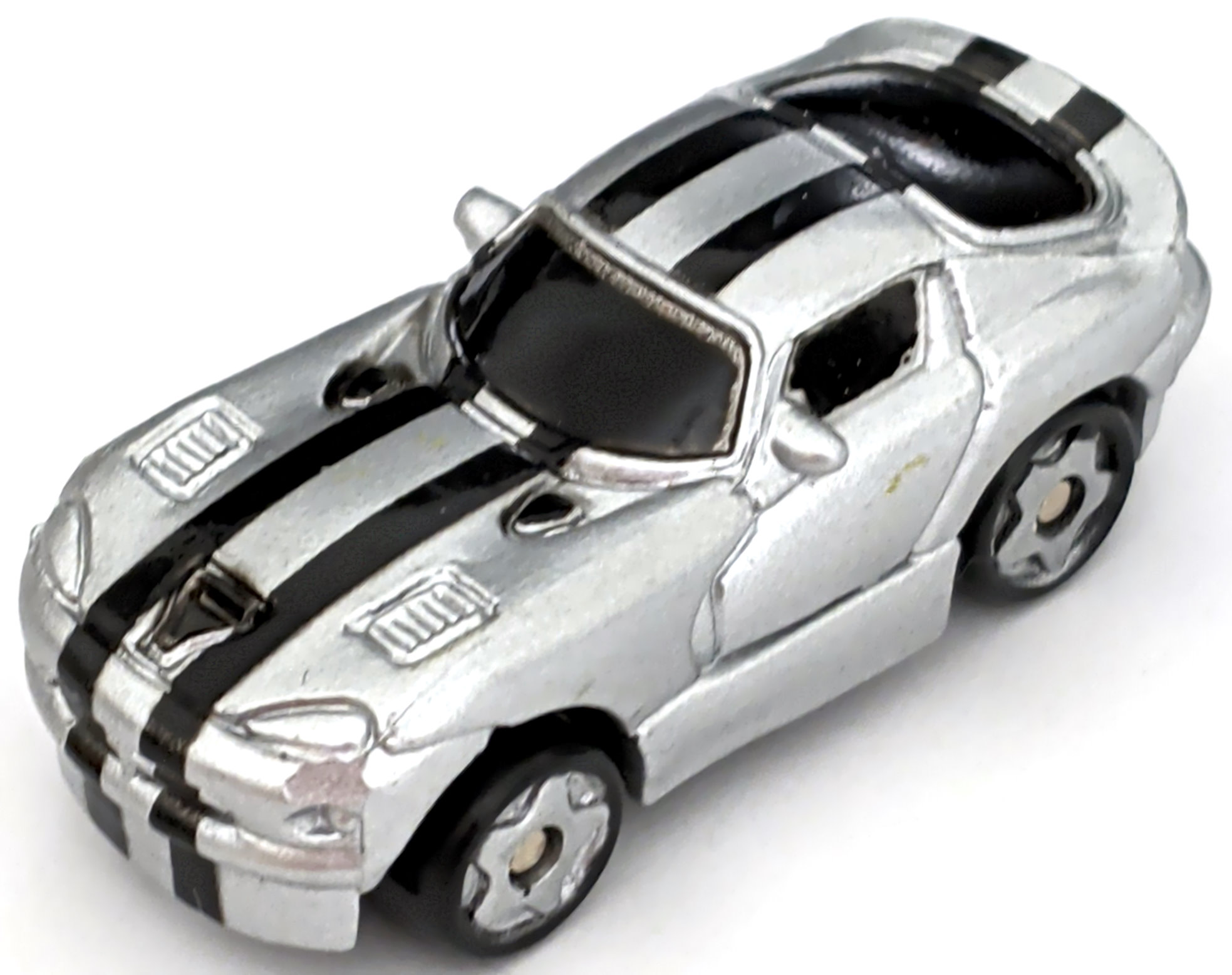
View of a Speedeez Model (Dodge Viper GTS)

Speedeez was a micro-scale toy car brand produced by Playmates Toys from 2002 to 2005. It made little toy cars from all of the brands.

== Vehicles ==
The majority of models is roughly 1.5 inches in length (scale 1:100). They consist of a plastic die-cast, hand-painted body and a plastic baseplate with a steel ball in the middle. The base plate is connected to the body via two rivets, philips screws or tri-angle screws (depending on the release type). Six vehicles were released as a glow-in-the-dark version. The steel ball adds weight to the car and makes it able to drift.

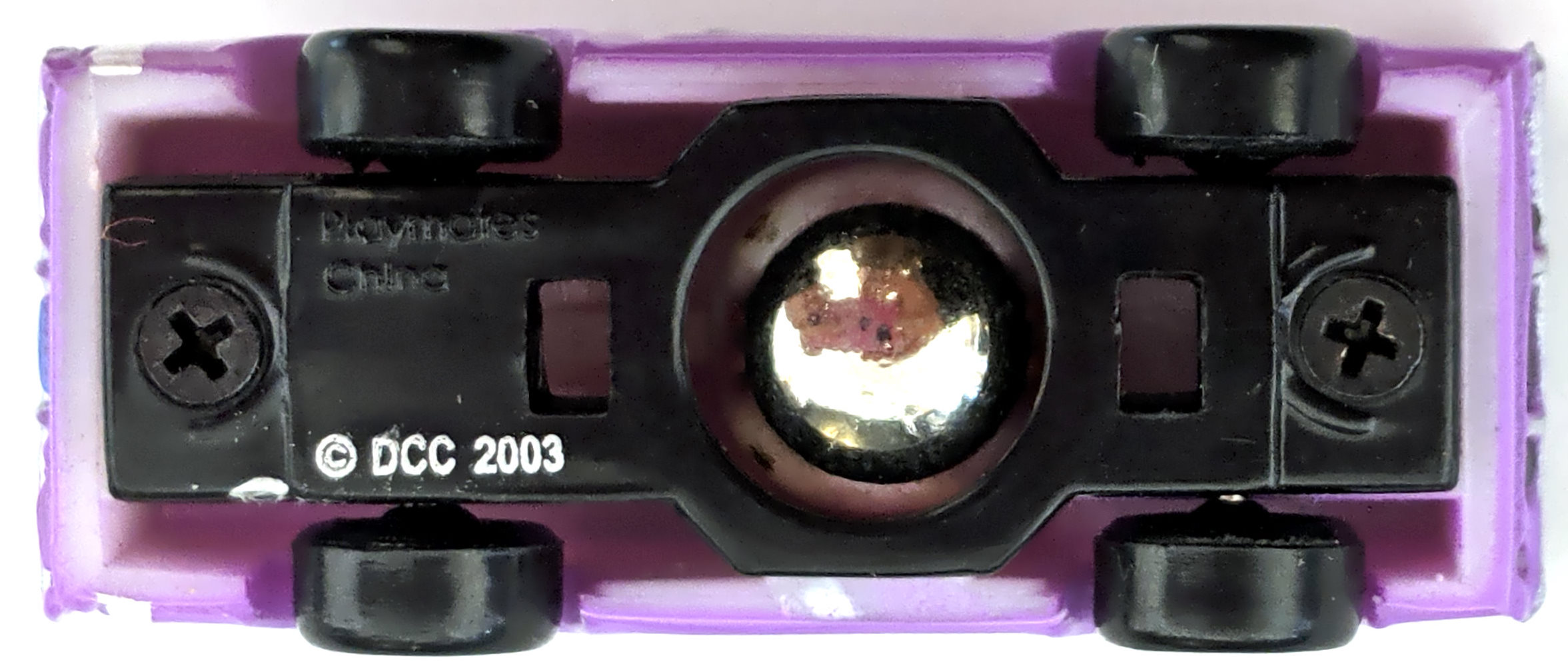
The baseplate of a Speedeez car

Some of the released vehicles are licensed by their respective car brand, which is reflected on the blister backing cards. The most prominent makes are Chevrolet, Chrysler, Dodge, Ford and Jeep. Some featured models have never been released in micro scale before, including the Jeep Jeepster, the Chrysler PT Cruiser, the Audi TT, the BMW Z3, the BMW Mini or the Dodge SRT-4. Some vehicles use the same moulds as Charm Max and Tamfort (Turbo Ball Racers) or are heavily inspired by Micro Machines and Funrise Micro Magnifier models.

== Distribution ==
Vehicles were distributed in various blister packs and included with playsets during the production run. The packaging was designed by Bill Ticineto of Go Dog Design Group, LLC.

== Playsets ==
Speedeez also released playsets.
