= Trash Bag Bunch =

US toyline launched in 1991

Trash Bag Bunch was an environmental-themed toy series produced by Galoob. The toy line consisted of individual, though sometimes paired, figurines, wrapped in water-soluble bags. The specific figure was not initially visible to the buyer; only after dissolving the bag packaging in water would the character inside be revealed. There was also a follow-up toyline, called Trash Bag Bunch II, although the packaging for these figures suggests it may only have been available in Sweden and Denmark.

== Story line ==
The Trash Bag Bunch consisted of two rival factions: a group of humanoids, called 'Disposers', who defended the environment, and a race of alien monsters, called 'Trashors', who created pollution and garbage. Wrapped in alien trash bags, they were tossed off their home planet, Garbigo, by Professor Garbof.
