= Galoob =

American toy company

Lewis Galoob Toys, Inc.
- Type: Private
- Industry: Entertainment
- Founded: 1957
- Founder: Lewis Galoob; Barbara Galoob
- Defunct: 1998; 28 years ago
- Fate: acquired by Hasbro in 1998, became a brand of it
- Successor: Hasbro
- Headquarters: San Francisco, CA, United States
- Products: Video games, action figures
- Brands: Micro Machines; Zbots

Lewis Galoob Toys, Inc., was a toy and video game manufacturing company headquartered in South San Francisco, California.

They are best known for creating Micro Machines, which accounted for 50% of its sales in 1989, and distributing the Game Genie in the United States.

== History ==
Lewis Galoob Toys was founded in 1957 by Lewis Galoob and his wife, Barbara Galoob, as a small distributor of toys and stationery. Galoob's first toy success was the reintroduction of a battery-powered Jolly Chimp, a cymbal-banging monkey toy that nodded his head when activated. The company was incorporated in 1968.

In 1970, Lewis Galoob became too ill to continue as president, and his 21-year-old son, David, dropped out of the University of Southern California to take over the family business. In partnership with his brother, Vice-president Robert Galoob, David aggressively pursued new product development, and transformed the company into a $1 million business by 1976.

In 1984, Galoob attempted to acquire the World Wrestling Federation (WWF) toy license, but lost out to LJN.

The company was greatly affected by the financial collapse of Black Monday in 1987, a year in which it lost $25 million, but the following year it recovered by generating a profit of $6 million. By 1988 the company manufactured 85% of its toys in China.

Galoob was involved in a landmark intellectual property lawsuit, Lewis Galoob Toys, Inc. v. Nintendo of America, Inc., over the Nintendo Entertainment System version of the Game Genie. Nintendo charged that the Game Genie violated copyright by creating an unlicensed derivative of their copyrighted games. Galoob won the lawsuit and continued to distribute the Game Genie.

In September 1998, American toy giant Hasbro purchased Galoob for $220 million. Today, Galoob is a Hasbro brand name. The name began appearing on retail products starting in 2005. Hasbro has used the Galoob brand logo on its Titanium Series die-cast metal collectibles, including various items from Transformers, Star Wars, and Battlestar Galactica.

== Franchises ==
Licensed to Galoob for merchandising

- Aliens
- The A-Team
- Adventures of the Galaxy Rangers (Note: not released in the US.)
- The Animal 4x4
- Anastasia (1997 film)
- Army G.E.A.R. (toys)
- Baby Buddies
- Baby Face (toy)
- Babylon 5
- Battle Squads Military Action Fleet
- Beat Street
- BlackStar
- Biker Mice from Mars (Note: 1993 series.)
- Bouncing Babies
- Chrysler
- Cutie Club
- Defenders of the Earth
- Dinosaucers
- Dozzy Doll
- DragonFlyz
- Fancy Sounds
- Game Genie
- Garbage Pail Kids (TV series) (Note: not released)
- General Patch (Note: figures packaged as Gen Patch.)
- Go Monkey Go
- Golden Girl and the Guardians of the Gemstones
- Hollywood's
- The Infaceables
- Jonny Quest: The Real Adventures
- The Last Starfighter
- Lost n' Founds
- Magic Diaper
- Macro Machines
- Micro Machines
- Titanium series Micro Machines Transformers (Note: in conjunction with Hasbro.)
- Mighty Morphin Power Rangers
- Mr. Game Show
- Married... with Children
- Marvel Comics
- Men in Black (film)
- Mutant League
- Peugeot
- Peeper Pals
- Power Machines_(toy)
- Punky Brewster dolls
- Razz Blasters
- San Francisco Mint Model Gun Club
- Sky Dancers
- Spice Girls dolls
- Starship Troopers (film)
- Star Trek V: The Final Frontier
- Star Trek: The Next Generation
- Super Force
- Sweet Secrets
- T. and T.
- TNT Motorsports Tuff Trax
- Trash Bag Bunch
- Ultraforce (comics)
- Unifighters
- World Championship Wrestling
- Xpanders
- Zbots

== See also ==
- Lewis Galoob Toys, Inc. v. Nintendo of America, Inc.
