= Game Genie =

Line of video game cheat cartridges

- Original author: Codemasters
- Release: US: 1990
- Platform: Nintendo Entertainment System, Game Gear, Game Boy and Sega Genesis
- Type: Cheating device

The Game Genie was a line of video game accessories that allowed players to alter code transmitted between game cartridges and a video game console, known informally as a cheat cartridge. Developed by Codemasters and distributed by Galoob in the U.S. and Camerica in Canada, it debuted in 1990 for the Nintendo Entertainment System (NES), with later versions for the Super NES, Game Boy, Sega Genesis, and Game Gear.

The device was central to the 1992 landmark case Lewis Galoob Toys, Inc. v. Nintendo of America, Inc., where the court ruled that Game Genie did not infringe on Nintendo’s copyrights, as it did not create a permanent derivative work or impact game sales. The decision helped establish reverse engineering as fair use in the United States.

Despite selling five million units worldwide, plans for a "Game Genie 2" never materialized, and no versions were made for later consoles. Similar devices, such as Action Replay, Code Breaker and GameShark, later filled its role.

== Background ==
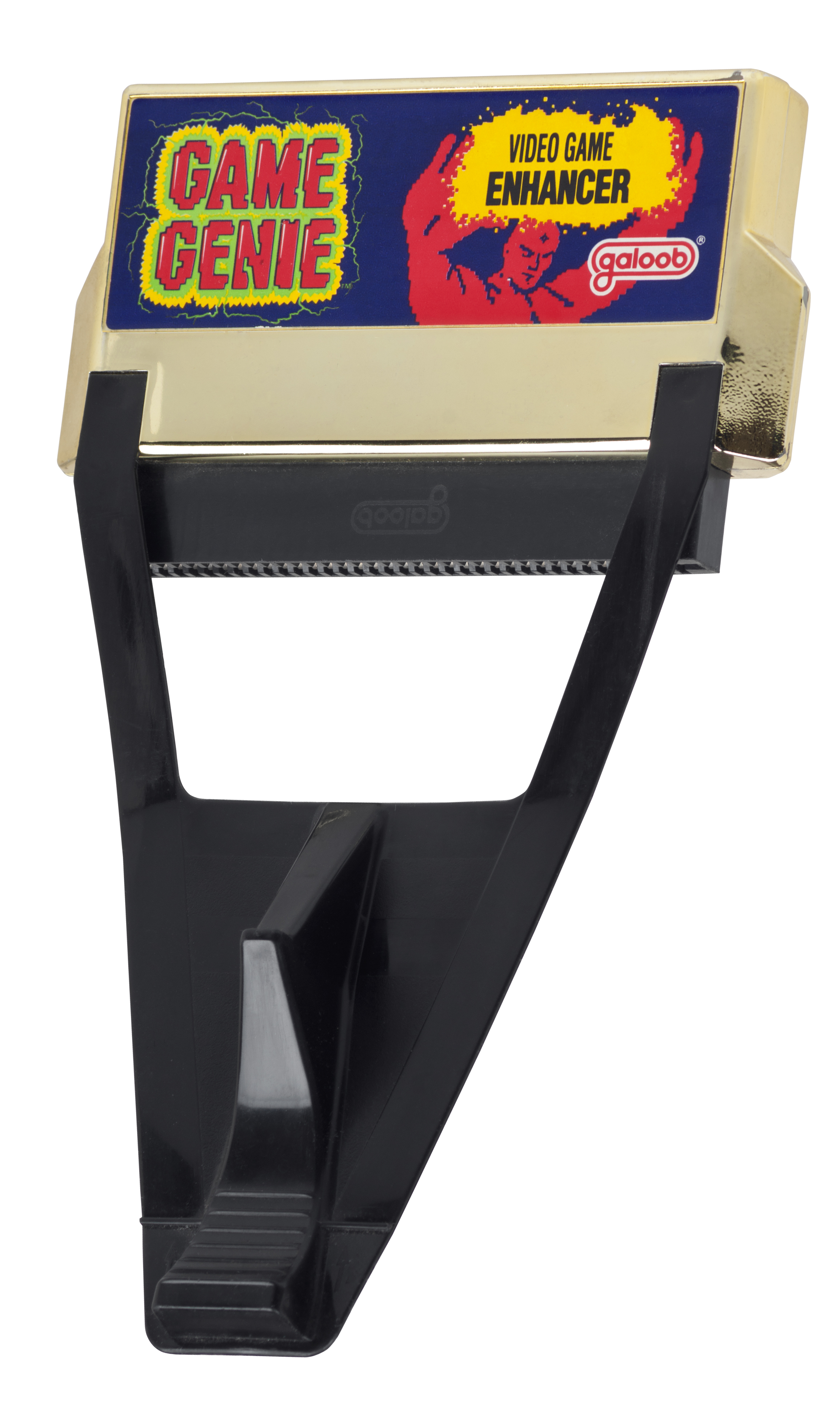
The original Game Genie for the Nintendo Entertainment System

The Family Computer (Famicom) was first released in Japan in 1983, followed by its North American debut as the Nintendo Entertainment System (NES) in 1985. By the early 1990s, the console had become so popular that the market for Nintendo cartridges was larger than that for all home computer software. The console had over 500 games created by more than 60 companies, each with a legal license to produce compatible game cartridges. By design, these cartridges were difficult for unauthorized third-parties to alter or reverse engineer. Each cartridge was manufactured with read-only memory hardware, including a 10NES chip that prevented unauthorized games from booting on the Nintendo console. This was designed to discourage counterfeit games.

In the late 1980s, U.K. developer Codemasters became interested in producing games for the NES. At a Consumer Electronics Show in Las Vegas, Codemasters founder David Darling tried to approach Nintendo's representatives, but they would not engage without an official appointment. Darling interpreted this as a "cold shoulder", and the company became determined to create an unauthorized development kit for the NES, starting by reverse engineering the console and cracking Nintendo's security measures. This allowed Codemasters to port their game Treasure Island Dizzy (1989) to the NES, and also allowed them to engineer a knob on the cartridge that could adjust the number of lives for the player character.

These discoveries led them to develop the Game Genie, a device that attached to NES game cartridges to modify each game. The device functioned by intercepting data from a Nintendo game cartridge, and replacing it with new data based on player input, before projecting the final result onto a TV screen. In most cases, players could use the device to make an NES game easier to win. For example, players could give themselves unlimited lives, make themselves invincible, or start at a later level, but the device also allowed more creative modifications, such as changing the player character into another sprite, or even accessing unused or unfinished parts of the game.

After securing distribution in Canada through Camerica, Codemasters also presented the Game Genie to Galoob, an American toy manufacturer. When Lewis Galoob's son first encountered the device, he became fascinated by the Game Genie's ability to make Mario jump higher. Galoob agreed to distribute the Game Genie in North America, and Codemasters acquired every NES game available, so that they could discover and document the various "codes" that would alter the game's output. The Game Genie was announced in May 1990, and was set to launch in July.

== Operation and design ==
The original Game Genie systems were pass-through devices that attached between a cartridge and the console. Upon starting the console, the player is presented with a menu to enter a series of characters, referred to as a "code", that reference addresses in the ROM of the cartridge. Each code contains an integer value that is read by the system in place of the data actually present on the cartridge.

Because the Game Genie patches the program code of a game, the codes are sometimes referred to as patch codes. These codes can have a variety of effects. Most published codes give the player some form of invulnerability, infinite ammunition, level skipping, or other modifications that allow the player to be more powerful than intended by the developers. In other cases, codes can make the game more difficult or even unlock game features that developers had scrapped and rendered unreachable in normal play.

The Game Genie was packaged with a booklet of codes that could be used across various games. However, this booklet became outdated as Galoob developed new codes and new games were released. In response to this, Galoob created a paid subscription service where subscribers would receive new code booklets quarterly. In addition, Galoob also ran advertisements in certain gaming publications, such as GamePro, that featured codes for newer games.

To create new codes, it is possible to enter random codes into a Game Genie. This evolutionary approach is equivalent to using random POKE operations. Usually, entering random codes will result in no noticeable change in the game or freezing the game and possibly corrupting save data, but a useful difference may appear in the game if this process is repeated many times. Once a useful code is discovered, making slight modifications to this code has a much higher probability of producing additional useful codes. With ROM files, emulators, and compilers for these games and systems, it has become possible to reverse engineer games to find specific ROM data to modify. This information can be directly converted into Game Genie codes.

The Game Genie is covered by US Patent #5112051, "Interfacing device for a computer games system", filed 30 May 1990. This patent expired on 30 May 2010, according to current US patent law.

=== Nintendo Entertainment System ===
The NES Game Genie attaches to the end of the Nintendo Entertainment System (NES) cartridge, causing the cartridge to protrude from the console when fully inserted, making the depression impossible. Therefore, the Game Genie was designed in such a way that it did not need to be depressed in order to start the game. This design put even more stress on the LIF socket than standard game insertion, bending pins and eventually causing units to be unplayable without the Game Genie present.

The Game Genie's shape made it difficult to insert into a New-Style NES without applying excessive force. Galoob addressed this problem by creating an adapter which was offered to Game Genie owners for free.

There also exists a version of the Game Genie for the Family Computer, distributed by Realtec and sold in areas where Famiclones were common.

=== Super NES ===
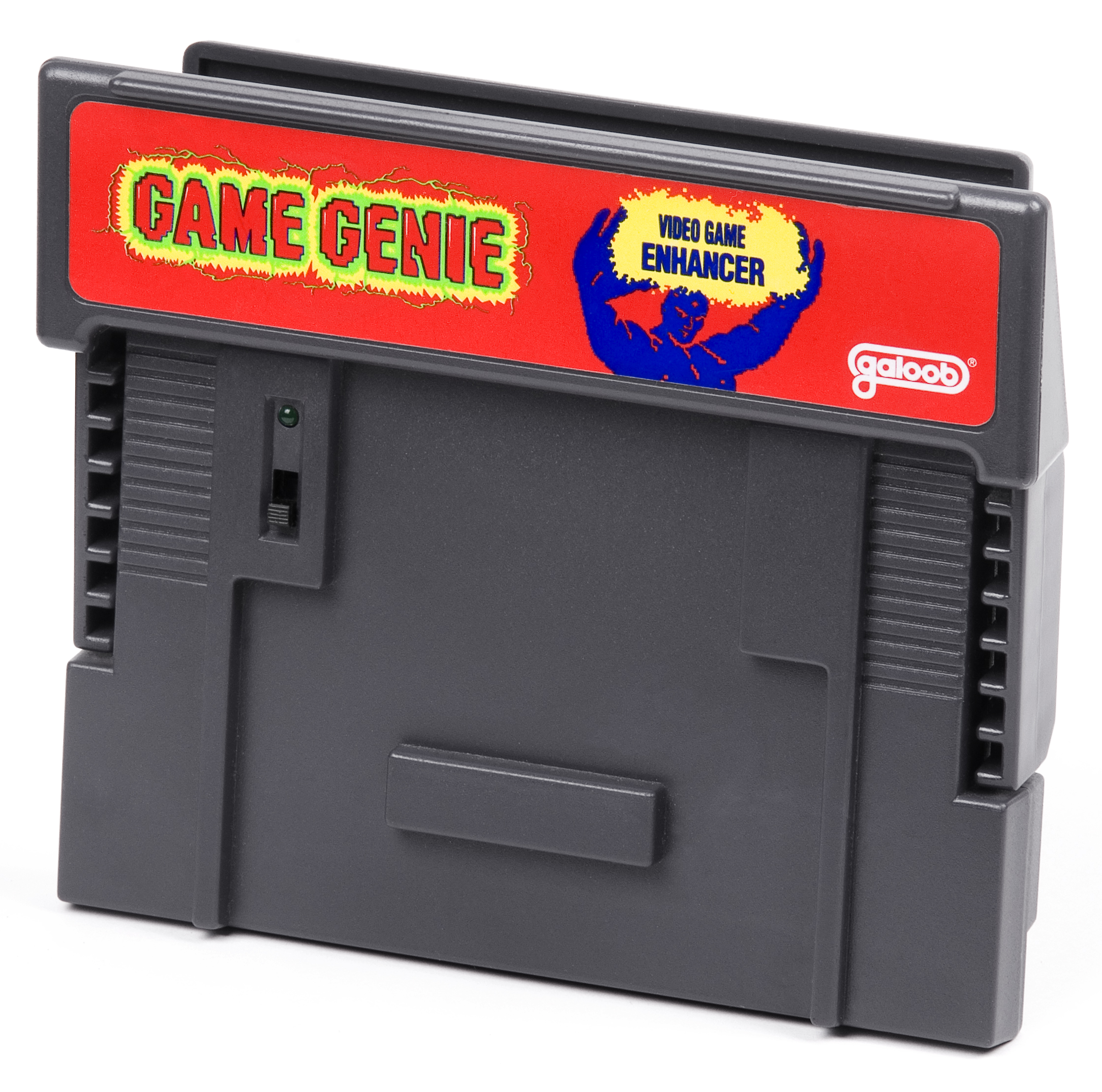
Game Genie for Super NES

The Super NES edition is incompatible with certain games, such as Star Fox and Super Mario RPG: Legend of the Seven Stars, as these games use pins that went unused in most games. It also has problems with the SNS-101, as only two codes can be used at a time. There are three known versions of the SNES Game Genie (v1, v1.1, v2). When comparing the PCBs of v1 and v2, v2 has much fewer components. All three versions look exactly the same on the outside, but when v1.1 is booted up, it will have dashes present before any code is entered. The only way to tell v1 and v2 apart is by opening the case and checking the PCB.

=== Game Boy ===
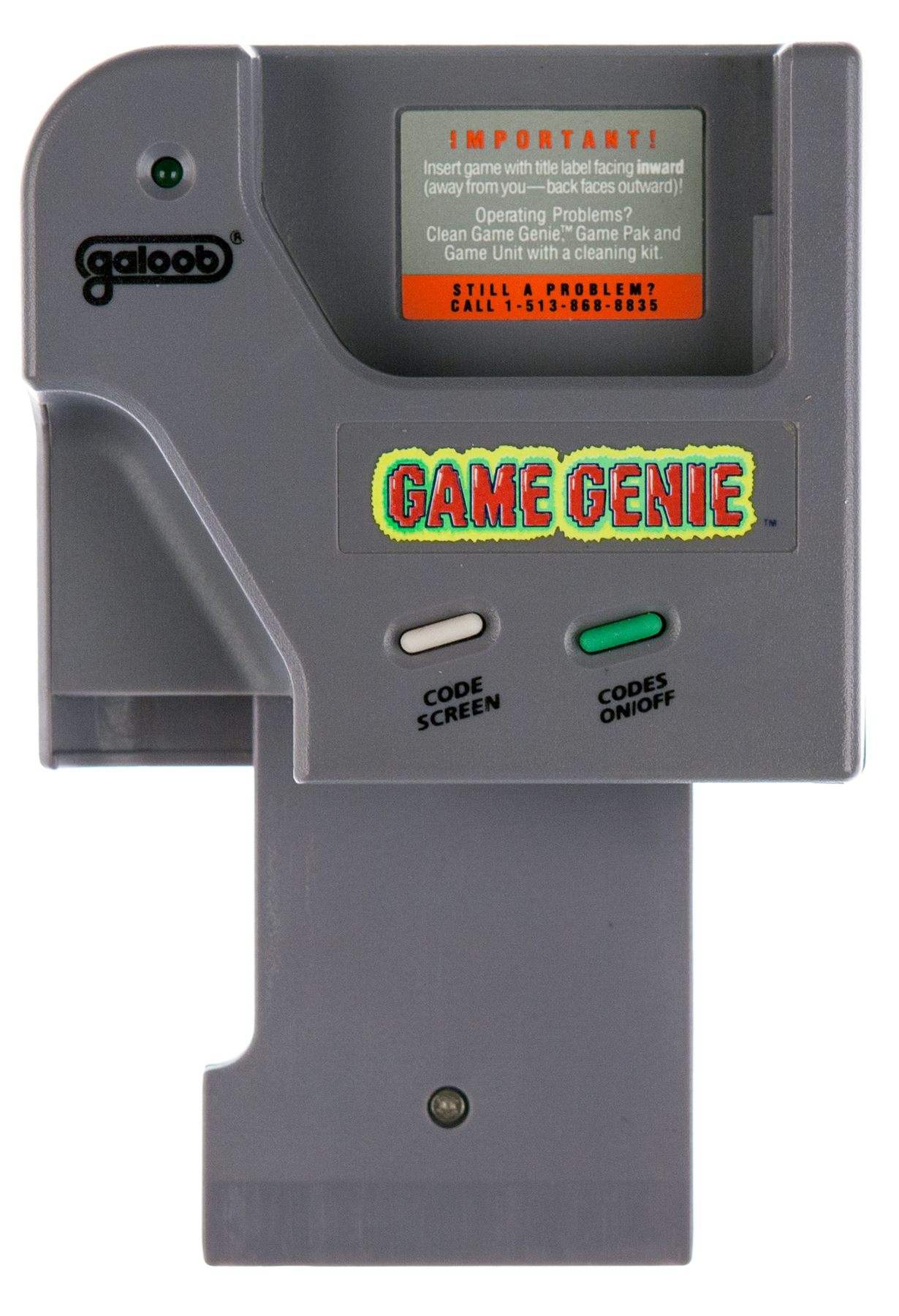
Game Genie for Game Boy

The Game Boy edition similarly has a slot for cartridges while itself needing to be inserted into the console's game slot. It has two face buttons for toggling codes on/off or to return to the code input screen. This edition also houses a compartment to contain a very small code booklet in the back.

The physical design made it difficult to be used with any version of the Game Boy other than the original. Although it could be made to work, if one attempted to use the Game Genie on the Game Boy Pocket, Game Boy Light, or Game Boy Advance, they would find the large top portion of the Game Genie would come into contact with the top of the handheld before it was fully engaged. Therefore, the Game Genie would need to be bent backwards in order to function, placing strain on the mechanism that allows it to be pressed down far enough to reach the cartridge contacts. Despite this history, it will work with the Game Boy Advance SP. A standard unit will not fit in a Super Game Boy, but with some minor modification to the plastic, it can fit and work normally. There was also a third party "Super Game Boy to Game Genie Adapter", allowing the player to connect the Game Genie to a Super Game Boy cartridge.

The unit is also not compatible with Game Boy Color or Game Boy Advance cartridges (which will not physically fit into the unit).

=== Sega Genesis ===
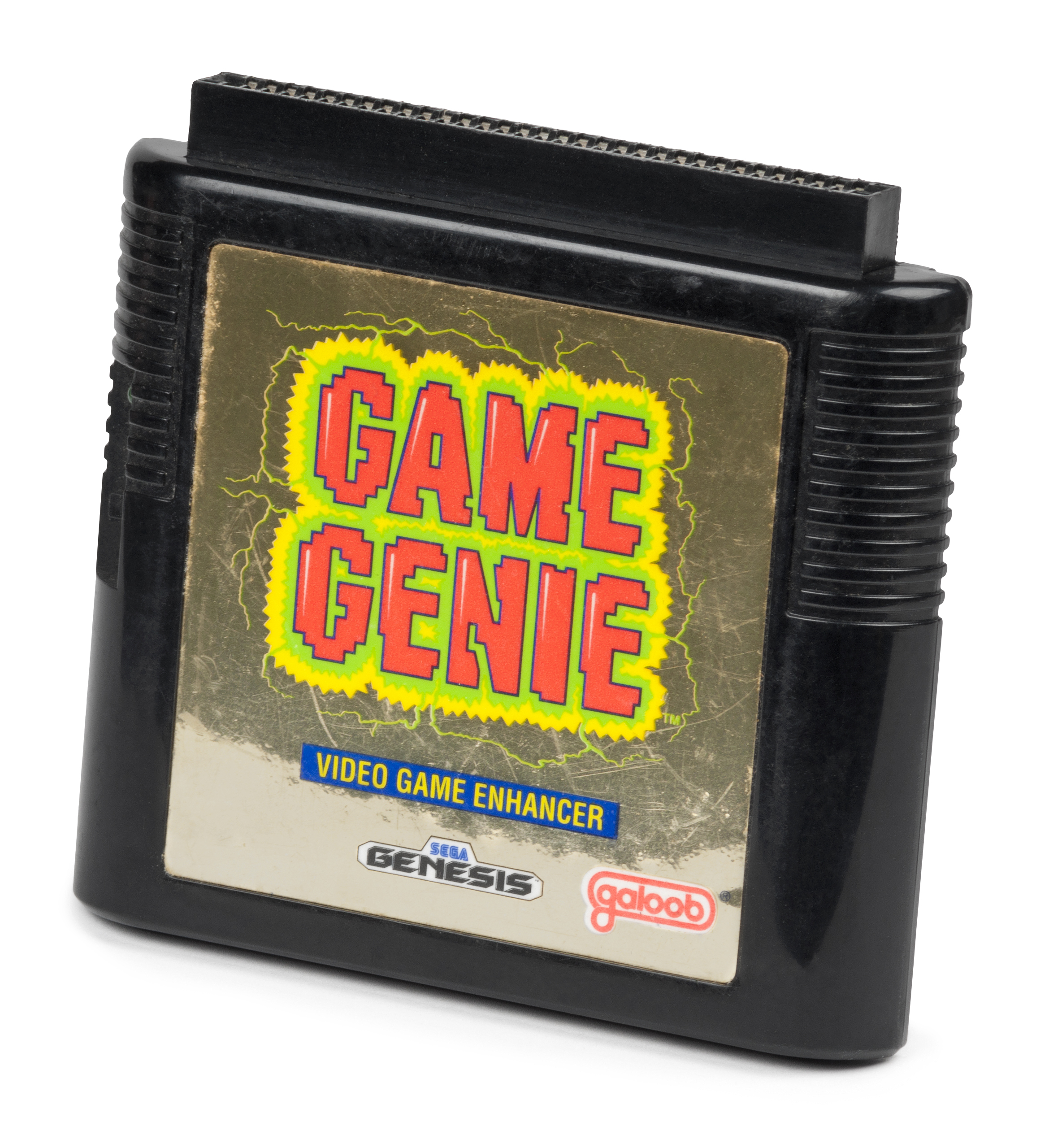
Game Genie cartridge for the Sega Genesis

On the Genesis/Mega Drive, the Game Genie can function as a country converter cartridge since most of these games are only "locked" to their respective regions by the shape of the cartridges and/or a set of a few bytes in the header of the ROM. Some games do not work with the Genesis Game Genie. The unit is also not compatible with Sega 32X cartridges (see "legal issues" below).

=== Game Gear ===
The Game Gear version of the Game Genie had a more complicated design than those for other systems. When inserted into the cartridge slot, another slot would pop up to insert the Game Gear cartridge. It also had a compartment which contained a book of codes. The codes were printed on sticky labels to put on the back of the Game Gear cartridge. When entering codes, the player could easily see what to type in rather than looking through the book.

In the code input menu for the Game Gear Game Genie, a player typing the word "DEAD" will cause the screen to move up and down, possibly as an Easter egg.

Again, some games do not work with this version of the Game Genie (see "legal issues" below).

== Legal issues ==
The introduction of the original NES Game Genie was met by firm opposition from Nintendo. Nintendo sued Galoob in the case Galoob v. Nintendo, claiming that the Game Genie created derivative works in violation of copyright law. Sales of the Game Genie initially stopped in the U.S., but not in Canada. In many gaming magazines at the time, Camerica placed Game Genie ads saying "Thank You Canada!" After the courts found that use of the Game Genie did not result in a derivative work, Nintendo could do nothing to stop the Game Genie from being sold in the U.S.

Nintendo tried to thwart the Game Genie, using ROM checksum in later titles intended to detect the cheat modifications. These measures were partially successful but some could be bypassed with additional codes. Later versions of the Game Genie had the ability to hide Genie modifications from checksum routines.

As the case progressed, Codemasters grew confident in both the Game Genie's legality and its commercial potential. This confidence led the company to negotiate with Sega, ultimately securing an agreement to sell the device with Sega’s official approval. However, this deal only materialized after Codemasters privately issued an ultimatum, warning of a potential lawsuit that would "open [the] floodgates," according to developer Richard Aplin.

== Game Genie 2 ==
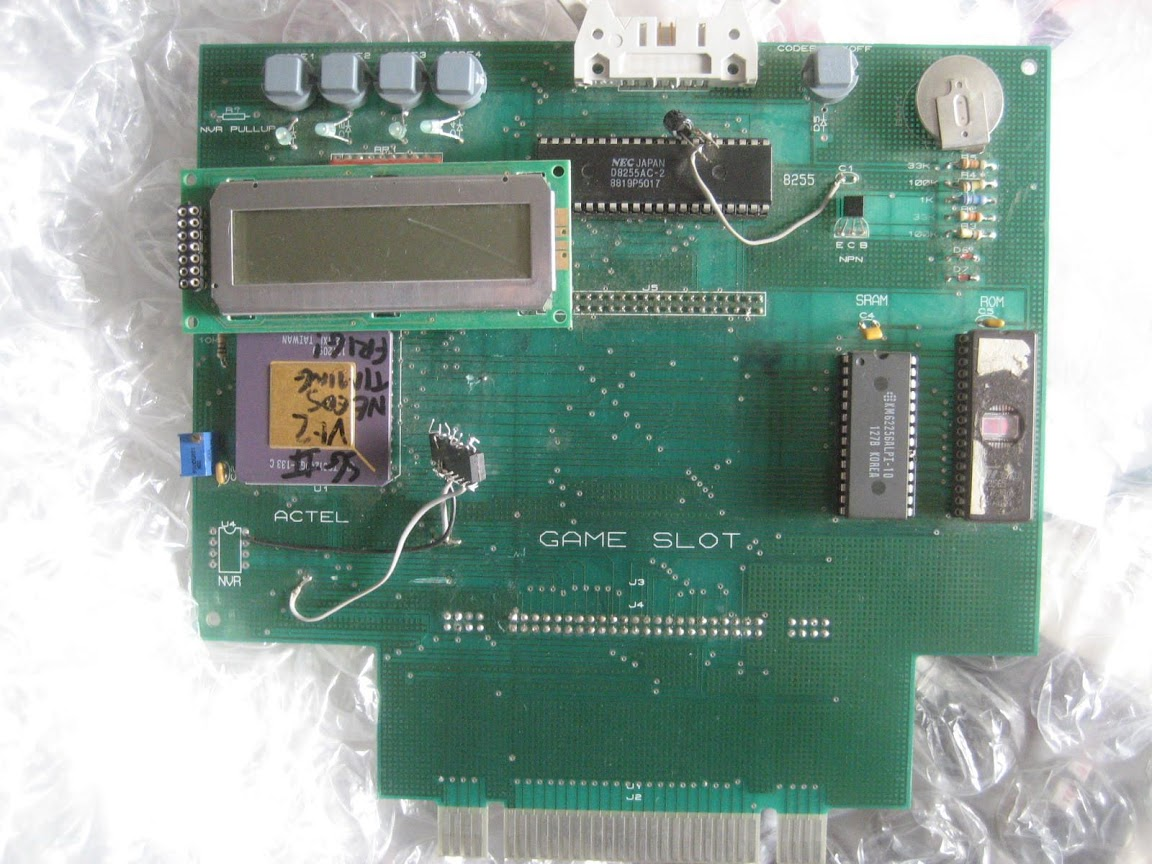
Game Genie 2 prototype for Super NES (unreleased)

A substantially more powerful device was developed by Codemasters for the Super NES, with many improvements including the ability for users to find their own cheat codes, to selectively activate cheats during gameplay using the game controller, to switch games into a slow-motion mode, as well as automatically save and restore the high-scores from games into battery-backed memory on the Game Genie device itself. A fully working prototype of the device was completed, but was not brought to market due to changes in market conditions. One prototype is known to remain in existence, in the possession of Richard Aplin, one of its original creators.

== See also ==
- Action Replay
- Emergent gameplay
- GameShark
- Mig Flash
- Multiface
- ROM hacking
