= Micro Machines =

Line of toys launched 1987

- Type: Model car
- Invented by: Clemens V. Hedeen, Jr. (Fun City USA / Hedeen International), Patti Jo Hedeen, Ned Cain (Fun Maker/Hedeen and Companies)
- Company: Galoob (1987–2016); Wicked Cool Toys/Jazwares (2020–present)
- Country: United States
- Availability: 1987–2007; 2015–2016; 2020–present
- Materials: Metal and plastic
- Slogan: Remember if it doesn't say Micro Machines, it's not the real thing! (1987); Think big, Play small

Micro Machines are a line of toys originally made by Galoob (now part of Hasbro) from 1987 and throughout the 1990s. Micro Machines are tiny scale component style "playsets" and vehicles that are slightly larger than N scale.

== History ==
=== The toys ===
Many different styles of Micros have been made including all the popular cars and trucks of the times, trains, emergency vehicles, tanks, boats, airplanes, helicopters, and motorcycles, and people. The Tuff Trax series contained many of the popular TNT Motorsports Monster Trucks, including the influential Grave Digger truck. Star Trek and Star Wars models were also made, as were models from other science fiction franchises including Babylon 5, Power Rangers and MIB. James Bond and Indiana Jones themed toys were also released. After being bought by Hasbro, Winner's Circle NASCAR and G.I. Joe themed cars and playsets were added.

While the Micro Machines collection is known primarily for sizing down automobiles, it has also featured several playsets including 1991's fold-out Super Van City. Licensed character products would often be fold-open heads including miniature characters and vehicles interactive with their playset environment. Micro Machines also utilized several diverse features such as color-changing cars and "Private Eyes" vehicles that even allowed one to peek inside and view an illustration of the contents.

One of the many Micro Machines product lines was the Insiders series. Incredibly popular in the late ’80s and early ’90s, the Insiders series featured a small vehicle inside the standard size Micro Machine. The body and chassis of the larger vehicle connected via a hinge. Opening the larger revealed the smaller, which was a different model of car.

Micro Machines released a special Presidential Limousine series, which used President Harry Truman's 1950 Lincoln Cosmopolitan Bubble top limousine. President John F. Kennedy's Lincoln Continental or the X-100 convertible limousine, and President Jimmy Carter's 1977 Lincoln Town Car was featured in series done in 1989.

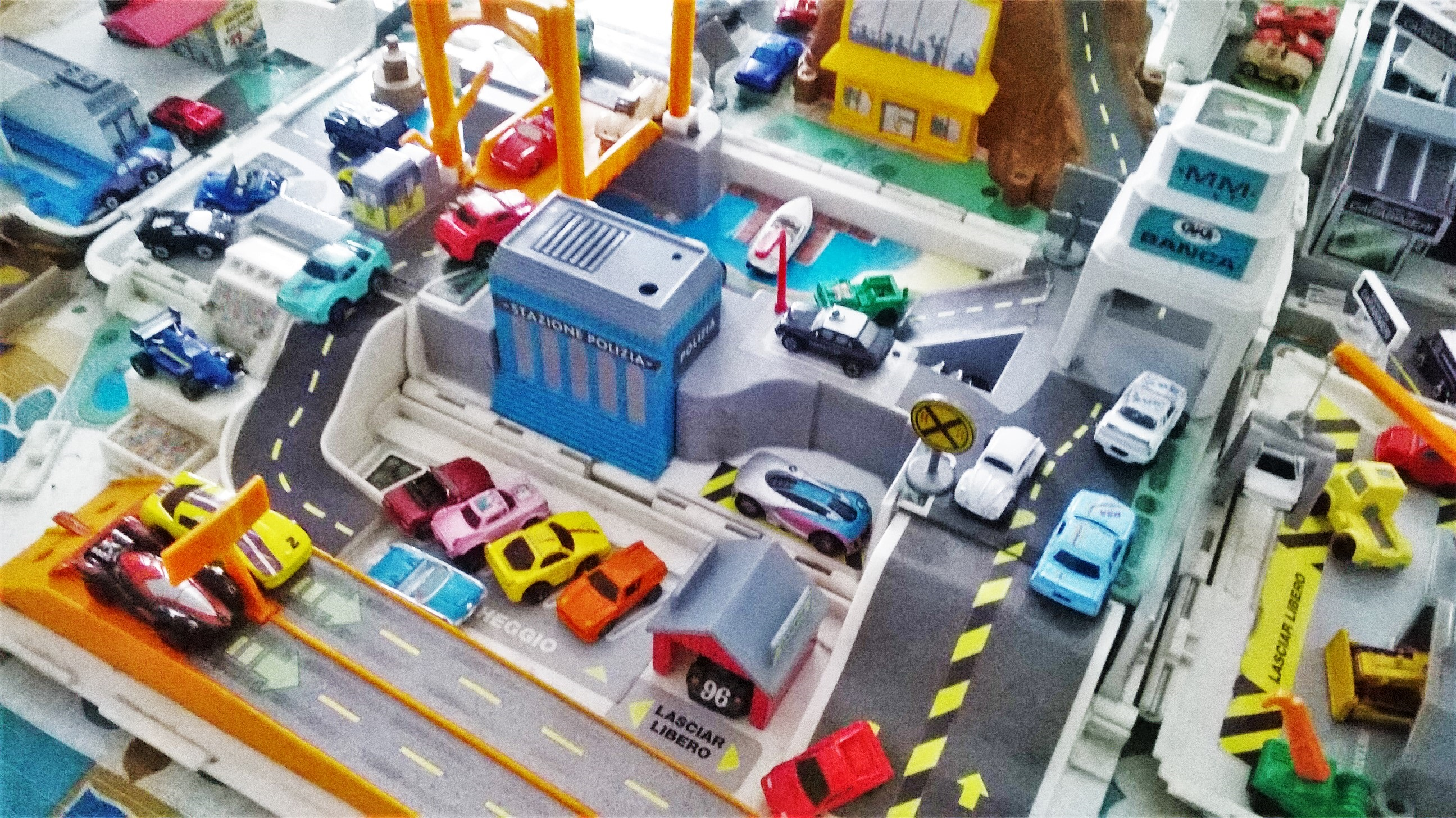
A popular playset from the 1990s

For 3 to 4 years, Micro Machines was the largest selling toy car line in the US with total dollar sales exceeding the combined sales of the next top-selling lines: Hot Wheels, Matchbox and Majorette.

Micro Machines had a well-known advertising campaign in the 1980s involving fast-talker John Moschitta Jr. The commercials featured pitches in his trademark speedy style and ended with the slogan "If it doesn't say Micro Machines, it's not the real thing!".

In the 1990s, transforming playsets were released. Some could transform from one playset to another, such as a factory to a test track. Others could transform from giant vehicles to playsets, such as a 6x6 to a jungle. Earlier releases included models that could transform from a toolbox to a city. Another innovative release was a line of special boats in the 1990s. While past boats had merely sunk and were not intended for water use, these new sets could actually float.

When sold to Hasbro, the basic line was largely discontinued, and new packaging of the toys did not catch on. In 2006, the brand name was visible only in the detail panel of the Star Wars and Transformers Titanium series die-cast vehicles and figures.

== In popular culture ==
Early Micro Machines television commercials were famous for featuring actor John Moschitta Jr., who was (at the time) listed in the Guinness Book of World Records as the world's fastest talker. As a result of his work in the commercials, Moschitta came to be known as the "Micro Machines man".

Micro Machines were featured in the 1990 Christmas movie Home Alone, starring Macaulay Culkin. In the movie, Culkin's character sets dozens of Micro Machines at the bottom of a flight of stairs as a hazard for a pair of bungling burglars. This trap was also featured in the Sega Genesis game, though it is referred to generically as "Toys".

== Revivals ==
=== First revival ===
The Micro Machines brand was revived for a few years in response to the popularity of the similar Speedeez brand. Hasbro also opted to use many fantasy castings in the revival. The revival only lasted a couple of years.

The brand 'Micro Machines' has also been incorporated into the packaging of the popular 'Star Wars: Titanium Series' 3-inch vehicle range.

=== Second revival ===
In 2015 with the release of the movie Star Wars Episode VII: The Force Awakens, Hasbro released a new set of themed Micro Machines. This second revival lasted only a year; no more sets were released after Rogue One.

=== Third revival ===
At the 2020 New York Fair, new Micro Machines were announced and are available in stores as of August 2020. Sets include Muscle Cars, Farm, Racing, Construction, and Off-Road, and an updated version of the Super Van City is available as well.

== See also ==
- Micro Machines (video game series)
- Zbots
