= Journal of Intellectual Property Law =

- Discipline: Intellectual property law
- Language: English
- Edited by: Hunter T. Payne

Publication details
- History: 1993–present
- Publisher: University of Georgia School of Law
- Frequency: Biannually

Standard abbreviations
- Bluebook: J. Intell. Prop. L.
- ISO 4: J. Intellect. Prop. Law

Indexing
- LCCN: 94655043
- OCLC no.: 30014024

Links
- Journal homepage

Journal of Intellectual Property Law is a biannual student-edited law review covering intellectual property law published by the University of Georgia School of Law. The journal covers trademarks, patents, copyright law, trade secrets, internet law, and sports and entertainment law.

== Overview ==
The journal was established in 1993 to respond to what the United States Circuit Court of Appeals judge Stanley F. Birch, Jr. described as "[t]he need for greater exposition on the law of intellectual property." In 2010, the Supreme Court of the United States cited the journal in Justice John Paul Stevens' concurring opinion in Bilski v. Kappos. In 2015, Washington and Lee University's Law Journal Rankings placed the journal among the top twenty five intellectual property law journals with the highest impact factor, and among the top ten most cited by cases.

== Abstracting and indexing ==
The journal is abstracted or indexed in:

- EBSCO databases,
- HeinOnline
- LexisNexis
- Westlaw, and
- The University of Washington's Current Index to Legal Periodicals.

== See also ==
- List of law journals
- List of intellectual property law journals
