= James Rolfe =

American YouTuber (born 1980)

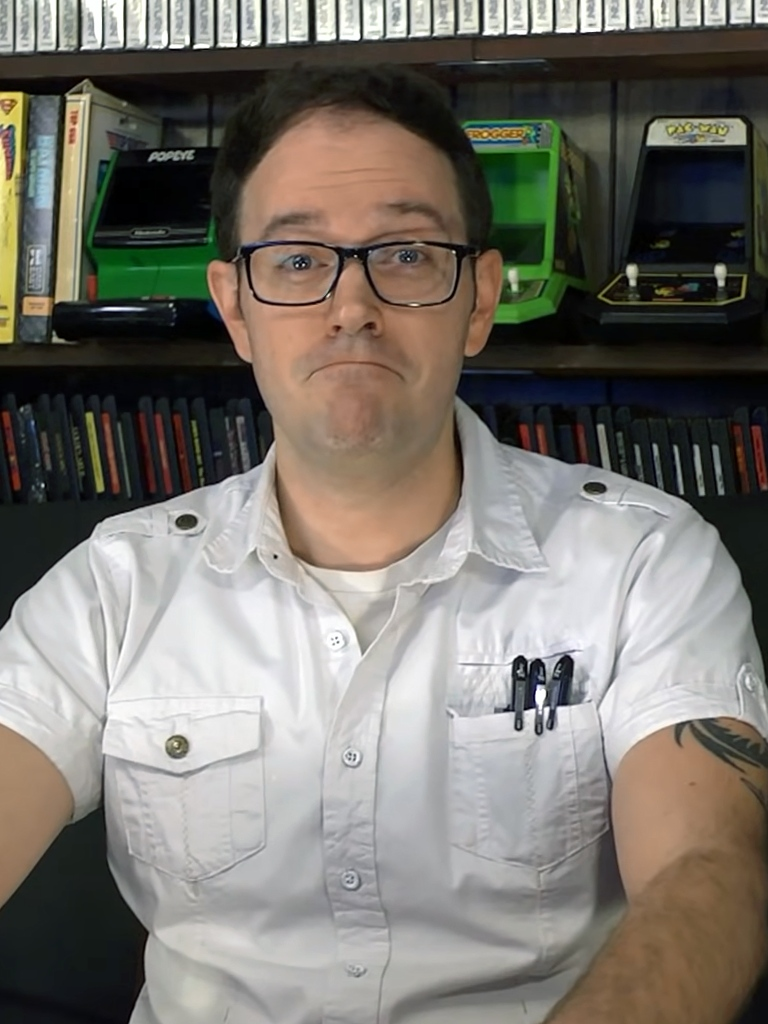
- Rolfe in character as the Nerd in 2021
- Born: James D. Rolfe; July 10, 1980 (age 46); Philadelphia, Pennsylvania, U.S.
- Education: University of the Arts (BFA)
- Occupations: YouTuber; media commentator; video game critic; film critic; actor; filmmaker
- Years active: 1996–present
- Known for: Creating and hosting the retro gaming web series Angry Video Game Nerd (2004–present)
- Spouse: April Chmura (m. 2007)
- Children: 1

YouTube information
- Channels: Cinemassacre; Cinemassacre Clips
- Years active: 2006–present
- Genres: Gaming; sketch comedy; Let's Play; game review
- Subscribers: 4.03 million (Cinemassacre); 493 thousand (Cinemassacre Clips)
- Views: 2.47 billion (Cinemassacre); 173.9 million (Cinemassacre Clips)
- An audio sample of Rolfe as The Angry Video Game Nerd
- Last updated: September 21, 2026
- Website: cinemassacre.com

James D. Rolfe (born July 10, 1980) is an American YouTuber, filmmaker, and actor. He is best known for creating and starring in the comedic retro gaming web series Angry Video Game Nerd (2004–present). His spin-off projects include reviews of retro films, television series, and board games. He is considered a pioneer of online gaming content and is noted for his widespread influence on YouTube after the series premiered on the site in 2006.

Rolfe began creating homemade video productions in the late 1980s and had filmed more than 270 video projects by 2004. Among these were the first Angry Video Game Nerd episodes (originally titled Bad NES Games, and later Angry Nintendo Nerd), which were released on his Cinemassacre website in 2004. Two years later, he gained mainstream attention when the series went viral after being published to YouTube. Following its success, Rolfe released a feature-length film based on the series in 2014, which received mixed reviews. He has published two books: his autobiography, A Movie Making Nerd (2022) and a horror fiction book titled Gnome Cave (2025).

== Early life ==
Rolfe was born on July 10, 1980, at Jeanes Hospital in Philadelphia, Pennsylvania to Scott and Marlene Rolfe. He was raised in southern New Jersey and graduated in 1999 from Edgewood Regional High School. He is of Italian ancestry. His parents bought him an audio recorder as a Christmas present in the early to mid-1980s. Later, he received a camera and took photographs of himself and his friends play-fighting. He was inspired by The Legend of Zelda and Teenage Mutant Ninja Turtles to create adventure stories. Rolfe also illustrated comic books, which he updated monthly. One such comic he created had a plot inspired by the video game The Legend of Zelda: A Link to the Past.

Rolfe began filming shorts in 1989, and continued the hobby into the mid-1990s. He used Mario Paint for a few of his early films. His early work did not have scripts or rehearsals. However, once he began writing scripts, his friends gradually lost interest due to the pressure of remembering their lines, which left many of Rolfe's films unfinished. He then experimented with action figures and puppets. The plot of The Giant Movie Director (1994) involved toys coming to life. Rolfe attended a special education school for seven and a half years during his childhood. Reflecting on his past, he said, "In school, I had a rough time communicating. I went to special ed for seven-and-a-half years. I liked it, I had a good time. But socializing in general... I was a little awkward. Art always made me feel comfortable."

Rolfe attended the University of the Arts in Philadelphia, where he studied filmmaking. While in college, he met several friends who would later become collaborators on future projects, including Mike Matei, Kyle Justin, and Brendan "Bootsy" Castner. He graduated with a Bachelor of Fine Arts in 2004. After graduating, he worked as a film editor for corporate safety and instructional videos but quit in 2007 following the success of his Angry Video Game Nerd web series.

Rolfe also operated an annual "haunted house" Halloween attraction out of his parents' garage (the same garage was later used to build a graveyard for his horror comedy film The Deader, the Better and again in his film/series pilot Jersey Odysseys: Legend of the Blue Hole), utilizing a collection of props and antiques that he reused multiple times in his other films.

== Career ==
=== Early films ===
In May 1996, Rolfe filmed A Night of Total Terror in his backyard, a horror film he has called "the turning point of [his] life". In the late 1990s, Rolfe created several films, including the B-horror movie The Head Incident, which he completed in 1999 but did not release until its tenth anniversary in 2009. He also made Cinemaphobia in 2001, which follows an actor who suffers from an overload of work and begins hallucinating cameras following him. Two versions of the film were made: a ten-minute version and an extended fifteen-minute version. Rolfe has stated a preference for the shorter version. That same year, he created Kung Fu Werewolf from Outer Space, a largely silent film except for narration. He also made an hour-long comedy film titled Stoney, a spoof of the 1976 film Rocky. His eighth film of 2001 was It Came from the Toilet!.

In 2003, Rolfe created another film, Curse of the Cat Lover's Grave, which was split into three parts to represent three different horror genres. He also made a pilot for a planned web series titled Jersey Odysseys: Legend of the Blue Hole, based on urban legends from the state of New Jersey. The pilot centers on the legend of the Jersey Devil.

=== Angry Video Game Nerd ===
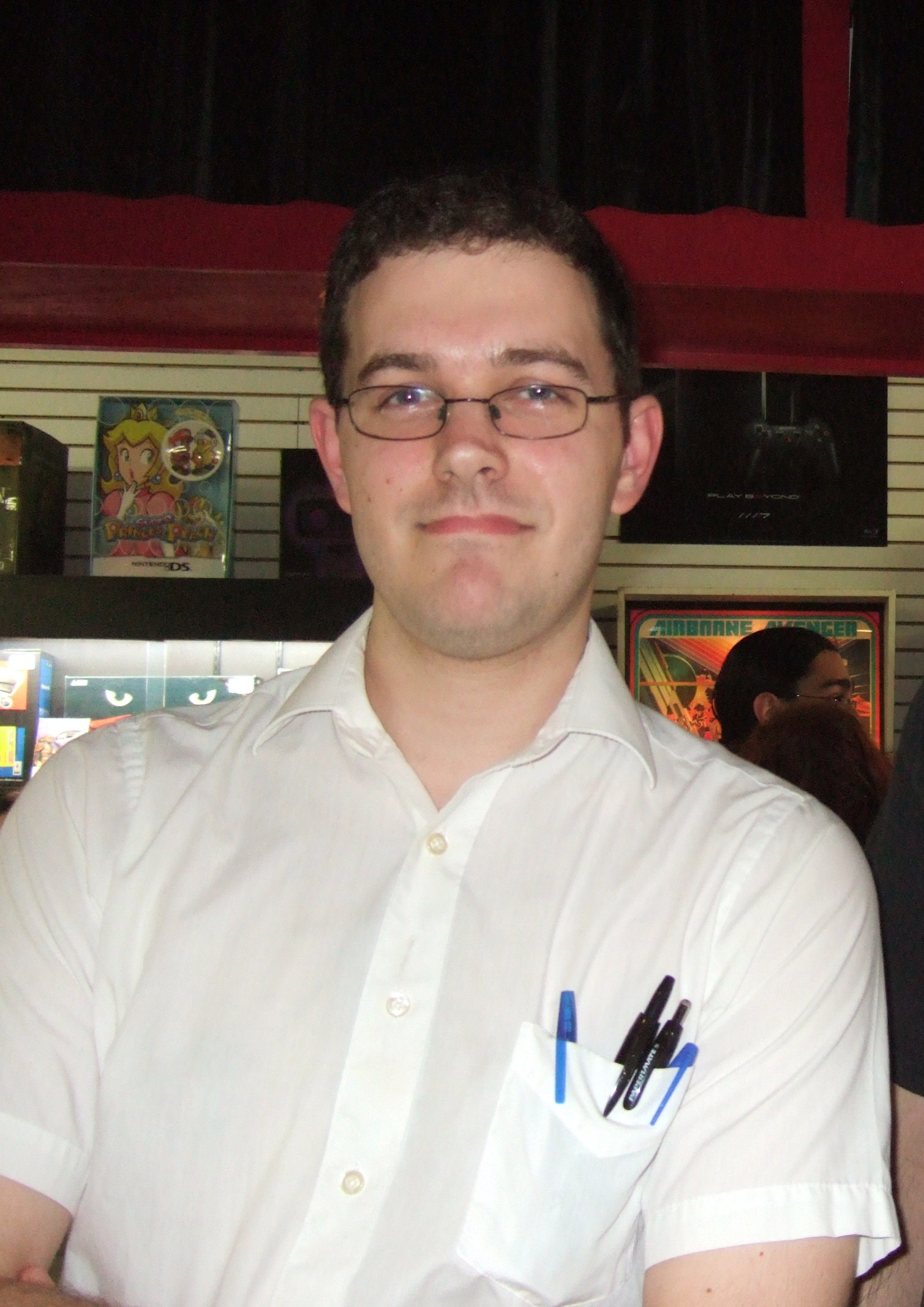
Rolfe in 2008 as the Angry Video Game Nerd at The Digital Press video game store in Clifton, New Jersey

Rolfe's career did not gain significant momentum until May 2004, when he filmed a five-minute short review of the Nintendo Entertainment System (NES) game Castlevania II: Simon's Quest under the title "Bad NES Games". His character was originally named "The Angry Nintendo Nerd" but was later changed to "The Angry Video Game Nerd" (sometimes abbreviated as "The Nerd") to avoid trademark issues and because he expanded his reviews to include games on other consoles (e.g., Sega Genesis, Atari 2600). Rolfe conceived the character while studying at the University of the Arts in Philadelphia, where he attended from 1999 to 2004. Rolfe then produced another video, a review of the 1988 game, Dr. Jekyll and Mr. Hyde, which was initially intended to be the last of the series due to his intense dislike for the game. The video introduced the running joke of The Nerd drinking alcohol in response to a particularly bad game; Rolfe initially used Rolling Rock beer for the gag, as it was the only beer available in his refrigerator at the time, but later performed the joke with Yuengling beer, hard liquor, or even non-alcoholic hot sauce. Although Rolfe originally intended to keep his videos private, his friend and collaborator Mike Matei persuaded him to post them to a YouTube channel called "JamesNintendoNerd" (now known as Cinemassacre) on April 6, 2006. Matei created and managed the channel for Rolfe.

On September 12, 2006, Rolfe's character gained mainstream attention when his review of Teenage Mutant Ninja Turtles became popular on YouTube. His videos were also posted on GameTrailers and ScrewAttack, amassing 30 million monthly views. As of April 2026, he has 4 million subscribers. At the end of 2007, Rolfe paused production of the series and canceled an appearance at MAGFest after experiencing a strain in his voice. On March 17, 2010, he announced that he was suffering from burnout due to the demands of consistently writing, directing, and starring in the videos, and that the show would enter a brief hiatus. It was scheduled to return in May 2010; however, an episode was released on April 30. Episodes are now released on either the first or second Wednesday of each month, instead of two episodes per month due to Rolfe's other projects. Episodes were at one point posted on YouTube over a year after their original release on GameTrailers. Rolfe was previously affiliated with ScrewAttack but left the company in 2013. In 2014, Rolfe partnered with Screenwave Media to assist with editing and writing the series, enabling him to better balance his YouTube projects and prioritize family time.

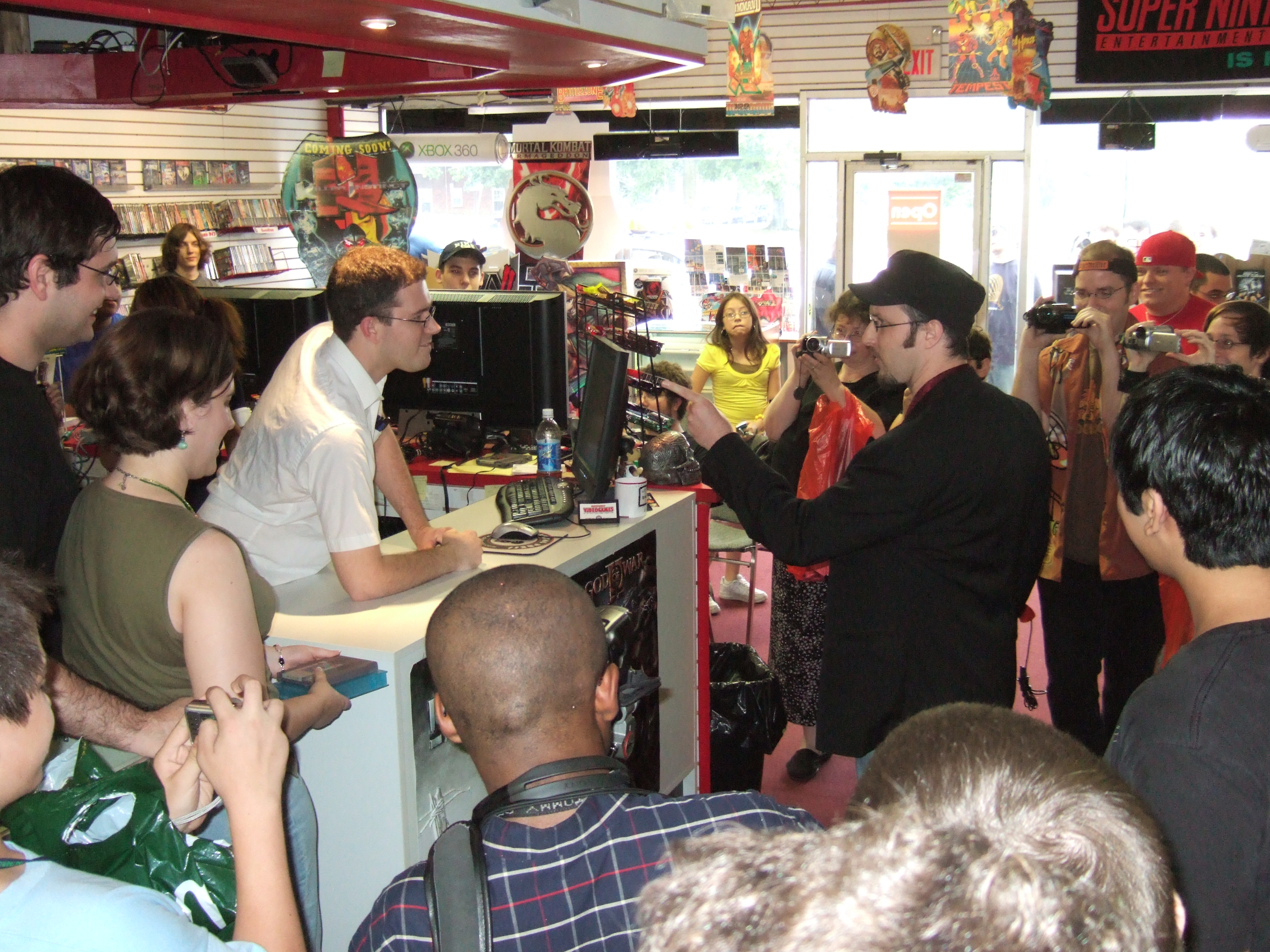
The Nerd accepts a challenge from the Nostalgia Critic, 2008.

Rolfe's Nerd character gained further fame through a fictional feud with fellow YouTuber Doug Walker's Nostalgia Critic character. The feud began with the Critic launching a satirical attack in an early video, prompting a response from the Nerd. The conflict played out across several videos between 2008 and 2009, culminating in a crossover video titled "TGWTG Team Brawl," where the characters fight and ultimately reconcile. Out of character, Rolfe and Walker clarified that the feud was entirely fictional and that they were, in fact, good friends. Both have since collaborated on numerous videos and other projects.

=== Angry Video Game Nerd: The Movie ===
For a period, Rolfe focused his efforts on producing Angry Video Game Nerd: The Movie, which centers around the E.T. the Extra-Terrestrial video game for the Atari 2600. The film was a collaboration between Rolfe and Kevin Finn and was entirely funded through fan donations. The film’s release in 2014 coincided with the 31st anniversary of the 1983 video game crash. The final sequence of the movie, in which The Nerd reviews E.T., was later released as a standard AVGN episode.

=== Other films ===
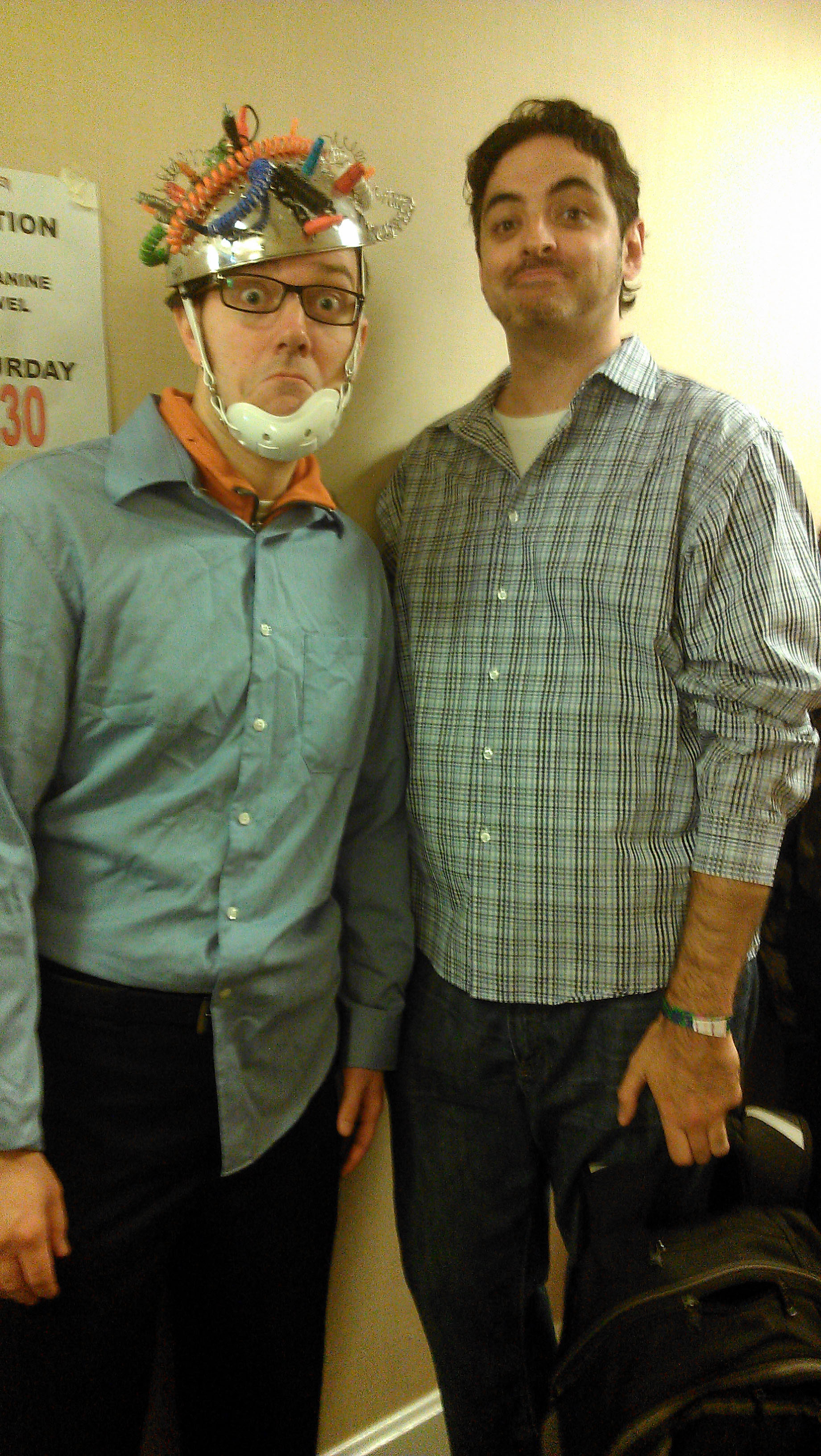
Rolfe (left) at the Chiller Theatre Expo 2014

In 2007, Rolfe began filming The Deader, the Better, a classic-style B-movie horror film that pays homage to the 1968 horror classic Night of the Living Dead. The film was shown at the Atlanta Horror Fest in October 2007. On May 5, 2006, Rolfe released a music video that included stock footage from a trip he took to England and Scotland. The music used in the video was from the Black Sabbath single "Heaven and Hell." Rolfe also participated in the 48 Hour Film Project between 2004 and 2007. In the 2007 event, he won the Audience Award for his film Spaghetti Western. His other entries included a trilogy of films titled Death Suit (2004), Death Seen (2005), and Death Secret (2006).

Rolfe had a cameo in a Doritos and Pepsi commercial published online in November 2010. The ad was part of a voting contest, with the winning clip scheduled to air during Super Bowl XLV. However, the ad was eventually withdrawn due to public backlash, as it parodied the Catholic practice of Eucharist.

In 2010, it was announced that Rolfe was set to appear in a low-budget remake of Plan 9 from Outer Space titled Plan 9, which was released via Video on Demand on February 16, 2016, and later released on physical media on January 5, 2017. In early to mid-January 2013, Rolfe had a brief role as a news reporter in an independent short film about Sonic the Hedgehog. He was offered a role in V/H/S/2 by Adam Wingard, but had to decline due to his commitments on Angry Video Game Nerd: The Movie. He was later offered a potential cameo in Godzilla vs. Kong by Wingard, but the demands of production, combined with the timing of the birth of Rolfe's second daughter, made the arrangement unfeasible. Rolfe also appeared in the crowdfunded 1980s horror documentary In Search of Darkness.

Commitment to YouTube videos has slowed Rolfe's progress in creating new features, but he produced a trilogy of new shorts following Angry Video Game Nerd: The Movie, including Dr. Jekyll and Mr. Hyde: The Movie (2015), based on the video game, Flying Fuckernauts vs. The Astro-Bastards (2016), a tribute to B-movie sci-fi, and Mimal the Elf (2017), a mockumentary. On May 25, 2017, in a general update video about the future of the YouTube channel, Rolfe announced he was in very early development on what he described as an "atmospheric horror movie...[the film would] take place in one room... very minimal.". On December 29, Rolfe announced that 2018 would focus more on his own original projects and that he had begun writing the untitled horror film, which would be in the vein of past works such as Legend of the Blue Hole and Cinemaphobia. On August 8, 2018, Rolfe stated that he was 50–75% finished with the script, that it would contain some "nostalgia theming," but that it would likely undergo further rewrites and had no plans to film it in the near future. On June 19, 2019, Rolfe confirmed that the script was completed but that his commitment to video production would delay the project for the foreseeable future.

On October 18, 2020, Rolfe announced that the horror film had been postponed indefinitely due to time constraints. Instead, he directed a sequel to his 1999 horror short, The Head Incident, reuniting several members of the original cast and crew. On June 10, 2021, Rolfe released a video explaining the premise of the shelved "nostalgic" horror film: it would involve a man revisiting a childhood amusement park, only to become trapped there. Rolfe stated that the project could be revived in another medium and that he was working on another small-scale screenplay. In 2025, Rolfe adapted the screenplay into a novel, Gnome Cave.

=== Other video series ===
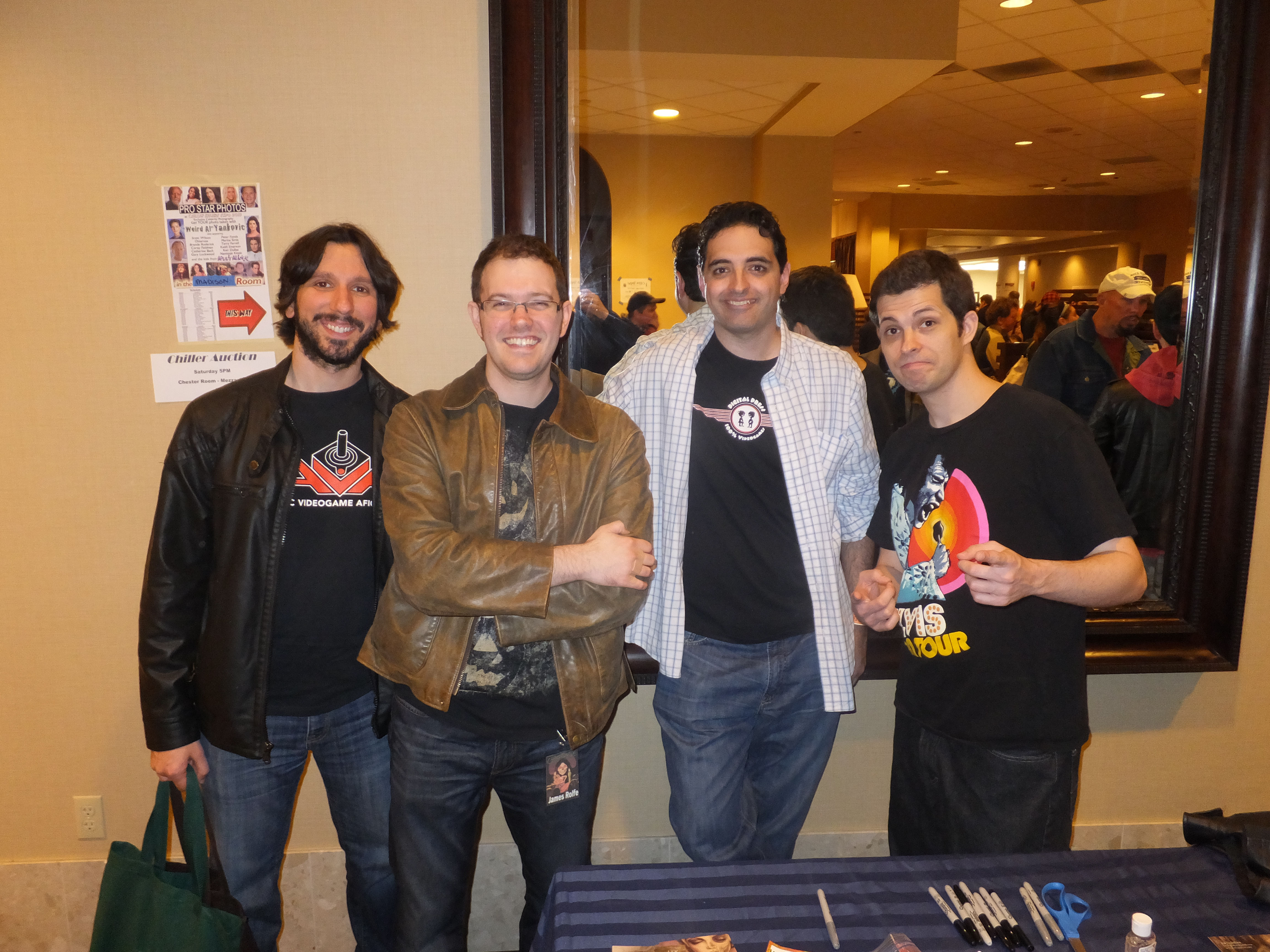
Rolfe (2nd from left) and Matei (right) at the Chiller Theatre Expo in 2013

In May 2007, Rolfe launched a new web series called You Know What's Bullshit?, in which he rants about everyday pet peeves such as pennies, shoelaces, pay toilets, and printers. Initially consisting of rants by Rolfe, he later decided to create a new character to host the series named "The Bullshit Man" (a masked version of Rolfe resembling cow dung). The Bullshit Man made several cameo appearances in AVGN content, including select videos and the video game AVGN Adventures as a secret character. In 2020, the show's name was abbreviated to You Know What's BS? due to YouTube's advertising policies.

Cinemassacre has published a number of other reviews featuring Rolfe and his associates as themselves. Topics covered include video games (under the James & Mike Mondays series), video game peripherals such as the VictorMaxx Stuntmaster headset, and films. One of Rolfe's other series is Board James, in which he, Brendan "Bootsy" Castner, and Mike Matei review old board games in a humorous way, often with recurring characters. The show eventually evolved into a psychological horror series, while still featuring board game reviews in each episode. The show ran for three seasons and 27 episodes before concluding in 2015.

Rolfe was involved in a fifteen-part series titled OverAnalyzers, where he played the role of the manager of a fictional company that overanalyzed various pop culture references. The series was edited and produced by another website called Cinevore. He also worked as a film reviewer on Spike.com.

Rolfe has hosted Monster Madness, a series in which he reviews one horror movie for each day in October, since 2007. Each year, he has adopted a different theme for Monster Madness. In 2007, the theme was the history of horror. In 2008, it was Godzillathon, where he reviewed all of the Godzilla films chronologically. 2009's theme, Monster Madness Three, dealt with a variety of popular and lesser-known horror films. 2010's theme, Camp Cult, focused on both campy horror films and cult classics, such as Troll 2. In 2011, the theme was Sequel-A-Thon, which covered horror sequels. 2012's theme was 80's-a-Thon, which featured only movies from the 1980s. While the first five years of Monster Madness involved one film review per day throughout October, the 80's-a-Thon series in 2012 was reduced to every other day due to the production of The Angry Video Game Nerd Movie. Despite the reduced number of reviews, the reviews in 80's-a-Thon were longer than those in previous years' Monster Madness. In October 2013, Monster Madness returned to one review per day with Sequel-A-Thon 2, which covered more horror sequels. The 31-day marathon of Monster Madness continued in October 2016. Rolfe expressed his desire to explore other Halloween-themed projects and reviews in the future but stated that Monster Madness will always live on in some form.

In 2017, Son of Monster Madness debuted, consisting of five new reviews, with the rest of October filled by reuploads of older reviews previously not available on YouTube. Monster Madness, under the original branding despite not having videos posted every day, returned in October 2019, now featuring Rolfe with a guest talking about the films. Rolfe brought back Monster Madness in its original 31-episode format in 2021 with the aid of Screenwave Media. However, Rolfe redacted and remade the first two published videos of the 2021 series after realizing that his writer had plagiarized content from the episodes' scripts.

In 2012, Rolfe and Mike Matei created a Let's Play series called James and Mike Mondays, formerly called James and Mike Plays, for Cinemassacre's YouTube channel. The series featured guests such as Kyle Justin, who composed the Angry Video Game Nerd theme song, Brandon Castner, better known as Bad Luck Bootsy from Board James, JonTron and Macaulay Culkin. Rolfe and Matei produced episodes for eight consecutive years until they announced the series would be on hiatus until February 2021. However, Matei left Cinemassacre in December 2020 to become a full-time streamer on Twitch.

Rolfe founded Rex Viper as a cover band of video game music and movie soundtracks from the 1980s. The band was inspired by a character Rolfe created for a review of Big Rigs: Over the Road Racing from his Angry Video Game Nerd series. Rolfe plays rhythm guitar in Rex Viper. The band uploads music videos of their covers to YouTube and also performs live shows.

== Personal life ==
Rolfe attended the University of the Arts in Philadelphia from 1999 to 2004 and continued living there after graduation. He briefly relocated to Los Angeles while filming Angry Video Game Nerd: The Movie (2014); however, he returned to Philadelphia upon completing the movie.

In 2004, Rolfe was involved in a car crash when a utility trailer detached from its truck, careened across the highway, and struck him head-on. Rolfe sustained no physical injuries, although his Saturn Ion, which he had purchased only nine days prior, was totaled. Later that year, Rolfe discussed his experience in a short film, Mechanical Losses.

Rolfe revealed in episode 7 of the Angry Video Game Nerd "McKids" that he has attention deficit disorder (ADD). Rolfe met April Chmura in July 2004; she was a cinematographer on the early Nerd episodes. They began dating shortly thereafter and married in November 2007. He announced at the premiere trailer for Angry Video Game Nerd: The Movie in November 2012 that they were expecting their first child. In April 2013, she gave birth to a baby girl. Rolfe has not disclosed many details about his daughter, except for a few photos and expressing gratitude that his wife overcame complications during childbirth.

In November 2013, April posted an update on Rolfe's Cinemassacre website, stating that their daughter was undergoing ongoing medical treatment due to unspecified complications. On April 13, 2016, Rolfe shared more details while announcing an auction of various Cinemassacre memorabilia to benefit Shriners Hospitals for Children. During birth, his daughter suffered nerve damage to one of her arms, requiring many months of physical therapy to regain full use of it. Rolfe expressed gratitude to Shriners for all they did for his family during that time.

== Filmography ==
=== Film ===
Year	Film	Role	Notes
1996	A Night of Total Terror	Thief	Writer, director, actor
1999	The Head Incident	Dr. Memrix/Bob	Writer, director, supporting actor, editor Short
2001	Cinemaphobia	The Film Actor	Writer, director, actor
2001	Kung Fu Werewolf from Outer Space	The Hitchhiker	Writer, director, editor Uncredited role; Cameo
2001	Stoney	Interviewer	Director; Uncredited role Short
2002	The Night Prowler	Narrator	Voice, director Short
2002	ROLFE: A No-Budget Dream	Himself	Documentary; Short
2004	Jersey Odysseys: Legend of the Blue Hole	Narrator; Jason's Friend	Writer, director, producer, editor Uncredited role Short
2005	The Deader the Better	Zombie	Writer, director, producer, editor, cinematographer Uncredited role Short
2005	The Mexican Mummy	Narrator	Voice, director Short
2006	The Wizard of Oz 3: Dorothy Goes to Hell	Narrator	Voice, director Short
2007	Return of the Ghostbusters	The Nerd	
2008	Piece of Meat	The Nerd	Special effects Short, music video
2008	Late Night with Ganondorf Dragmire	Ganondorf; Shit Pickle; Himself	Voice; Short
2009	His Name Was Jason	Himself	Documentary
2009	History of Super Mecha Death Christ	The Nerd	Writer, editor Short
2010	Never Sleep Again: The Elm Street Legacy	Himself	Documentary
2010	Kickassia	Board James	
2011	Suburban Knights	Voice of the Ancient World	Voice
2012	To Boldly Flee	Gort	
2013	Sonic	Light News Commentator	Short
2014	Angry Video Game Nerd: The Movie	The Nerd	Lead role, creator, director, writer, producer, editor
2015	Plan 9	Officer Cop Policeman	
2015	Dr. Jekyll and Mr. Hyde: The Game – The Movie	Grave Digger	Writer, director, producer, editor, cinematographer Uncredited cameo Short
2016	Flying Fuckernauts vs. The Astro-Bastards	Narrator	Writer, director, producer, editor, cinematographer Short
2017	Mimal the Elf	Beerman	Writer, director, producer, editor, cinematographer Uncredited cameo Short
2019	Shooting Clerks	Leonard James Nash	
2019	In Search of Darkness	Himself	Documentary
2020	In Search of Darkness: Part II	Himself	Documentary
2020	The Head Returns	Dr Memrix/Bob	Lead role, writer, director, producer, editor Short (sequel to The Head Incident)
2023	FPS: First Person Shooter	Himself	Documentary
2024	Shrek 2 Retold		Voice
2024	Are You Dead Yet?	Police Dispatch	Voice
2025	George A. Romero's Resident Evil	Himself	Documentary

=== Television/Web ===
Year	Series	Role	Notes
2004–present	Angry Video Game Nerd	The Nerd, Board James, The Bullshit Man, various characters	Lead role, creator, director, writer, producer, editor 216 episodes
2004; 2011	Munky Cheez	Various	Voice; 4 episodes
2007–present	Cinemassacre's Monster Madness	Host/Narrator/Himself	Annual series 234 episodes
2007–present	You Know What's BS!? / You Know What's Bullshit?!	The Bullshit Man	51 episodes
2008–present	Nostalgia Critic	The Nerd	Supporting role/cameo
2009	Metal Gear Ben	Mega Mantis	Recurring character/secondary antagonist
2009	Atop the Fourth Wall	The Nerd	1 episode
2009–2015	Board James	Board James, The Nerd	27 episodes
2010–2011	Spade	Luther Jessup	4 episodes
2011–2012	OverAnalyzers	Jim	15 episodes
2011–2014	Pat the NES Punk	The Nerd/Himself	5 episodes
2012–2020	James & Mike Mondays	Himself	387 episodes
2015	James & Doug	Himself	6 episodes
2016	Commander Chet	Eye's Dad	2 episodes
2017	Son of Monster Madness	Host/Narrator/Himself	30 episodes
2018–2020	Rental Reviews	Himself	34 episodes
2019; 2021	Scott the Woz	Narrator/The Nerd	2 episodes
2020	Puppet Steve – Minecraft, FNAF & Toy Unboxings	Ken Masters	Voice; 1 episode
2020; 2022	Irate Gamer	The Nerd/Himself	2 episodes
2020	Joueur du Grenier	The Nerd	Cameo, 1 episode
2022	Smiling Friends	Himself	1 episode
2022	Ollie & Scoops	The Bad-Tempered Cinema Geek (voice)	1 episode
2023–present	James & John – Neighbor Nerds	Himself	13 episodes

=== Video games ===
Year	Game	Role	Notes
2024	Plumbers Don't Wear Ties: Definitive Edition	Himself	
2026	The Angry Video Game Nerd 8-Bit	The Nerd	
