= Angry Video Game Nerd Adventures =

2013 video game

The Angry Video Game Nerd Adventures
- Developer: FreakZone Games
- Publisher: ScrewAttack Entertainment
- Programmer: Sam Beddoes
- Platforms: Windows, Wii U, 3DS
- Release: Windows; September 20, 2013; Wii U April 2, 2015; 3DS; June 4, 2015
- Genre: Platformer
- Mode: Single-player

The Angry Video Game Nerd Adventures (also known as AVGN Adventures) is a 2013 platformer video game developed by FreakZone Games and published by ScrewAttack Entertainment. The game is based on the web series Angry Video Game Nerd by James Rolfe, a series dedicated to humorous reviews of low-quality retro games. Made in a retro style, AVGN Adventures parodies the games Rolfe reviewed and contains numerous references to both episodes of the show and the games themselves.

Sam Beddoes, previously known for his 2012 game Manos: The Hands of Fate, designed the entirety of the game by himself. The game took inspiration from several sources, including classic videos games like Mega Man, Teenage Mutant Ninja Turtles, as well as some modern games such as Super Meat Boy and Scott Pilgrim. It was released for Windows in September 2013, and was later ported to the Wii U and Nintendo 3DS in 2015.

AVGN Adventures received positive reviews from video game journalists, who praised the gameplay, graphics, fan service, and music, but criticized its lack of fresh ideas in its short duration. A sequel, Angry Video Game Nerd II: ASSimilation, was released in 2016. A remastered version of the first two games, The Angry Video Game Nerd I & II Deluxe, was released in 2020.

== Gameplay and plot ==
Screenshot from the Nintendo 3DS version. The second screen displays information about the available characters and weapons.

The Nerd and his friends were going to play another bad game, when suddenly the screen began to suck everyone into the TV. The Nerd gets dragged into the screen by a mechanical hand, grabbed by his crotch. Armed with a NES Zapper, he goes through nine levels (eight basic levels, which can be done in any order, and one final one that opens after passing the rest) to free his friends and return to the real. The design of the levels is inspired by the themes that appeared in the show: for example, Assholevania uses ideas from Castlevania, Beat It & Eat It is about pornographic games for the Atari 2600, like Custer’s Revenge, and Blizzard of Balls which is from Christmas special episode. There are also references to classic video game franchises, such as the Mega Man, and Doom.

There are four playable characters: The Nerd himself, available from the very beginning, and three of his buddies, which can be access when going through the game: Kyle Justin as The Guitar Guy, Mike Matei and Bullshit Man. Each of them is armed with his own weapon (for example, Matei uses a lightsaber) and differs from speed and jump height. The player can also find secrets in the levels which has cameo characters, such as brentalfloss, Egoraptor, Jim Sterling and Mr. Destructoid.

AVGN Adventures is a platformer similar to Mega Man series. The character completes levels while killing enemies and avoiding obstacles most common of which are skull-faced blocks, instantly killing the character upon touching. During the game the Nerd will give pop-up text messages, comments on what is happening to him, and on the screen shown after the death of the character, randomly generated from keywords, cursory in the spirit of the James Rolfe show, is displayed. At the end of each level, there is a boss fight. At the normal difficulty, the player is given three health points (which are Rolling Rock bottles) 30 lives and an unlimited number of continues. At higher levels of difficulty, the number of lives decreases, the number of continues is limited, and enemies become stronger. At the maximum difficulty, the player has no continues, forcing the player to restart the game from the beginning.

== Development and release ==
The game was developed by Sam Beddoes of FreakZone Games. James Rolfe's work was a source of inspiration for him in the creation of his previous game, Manos: The Hands of Fate released in 2012. Impressed by this work of Beddoes, Craig Skistimas of ScrewAttack offered him to collaborate with him for future projects. Encouraged by this, Beddoes presented a design document to ScrewAtack through a Skype video call and showed preliminary versions of the graphics and music. ScrewAtack approved, and work on the project began.

AVGN Adventures was designed entirely by Beddoes, with ScrewAttack being the producers and beta testing. In particular, the developer was originally going to mimic visuals of the NES, but under the influence of the publisher abandoned this idea. ScrewAttack initiated the inclusion of several characters available to the player, eight available directions of shooting, as Contra. The main sources of inspiration were from classic videos games such as the Mega Man, Teenage Mutant Ninja Turtles for NES, and from modern games such as Super Meat Boy and Scott Pilgrim. Many elements of the game (for example, one of the bosses) were also borrowed from Manos.

The creators of AVGN Adventures were restrained of using copyrighted characters from the Angry Video Game Nerd series, for example, Bugs Bunny. Some of these characters were included in parody versions (Freddie Krueger and Jason Voorhees as "Bimmy and Jimmy"). Other characters, in particular, Dr. Jekyll and Mr. Hyde, were included as they were in the public domain due to the expiration of copyright. Most of the difficulties during the development were caused from debugging and balancing of the characters. The game was designed to be difficult, while still being possible to complete, making the player enjoy the game, but believing that the Nerd would have been dissatisfied with the game he's trapped in.

On April 8, 2013, AVGN Adventures was announced for votes on Steam Greenlight. It was released on September 20, 2013, for Windows. A Wii U version was released in North America on April 2, 2015, and released in Europe on December 10, 2015, with a 3DS version being available for the Nintendo eShop on June 4, 2015. The Wii U version can be played both using only with the GamePad and on the TV screen (in this case, the GamePad displayed the current special weapon and available characters). The same information is displayed on the bottom 3DS screen. The 3DS version also contains 3D effects.

== Reception ==
Reception

Aggregate scores
Aggregator	Score
Metacritic	PC: 77/100; Wii U: 78/100
OpenCritic	56% recommend (Note: Based on 9 reviews)

Review scores
Publication	Score
Destructoid	8/10
Eurogamer	8/10
Game Informer	7.75/10
GameZone	8/10
Nintendo Life	8/10
Nintendo World Report	8/10

AVGN Adventures received "generally favorable" reviews from critics according to review aggregator Metacritic, with a weighted average score of 77 out of 100 from 7 critic scores.

Critics praised the gameplay. The Russian video game website Igromania stated the gameplay was balanced and difficult. Destructoid noted that the developer successfully coped with the task of making a game that would include elements characteristic of the overly complex, containing strange design solutions and frankly bad games, but which in itself remained capable of interest to the player for quite a long time.

Critics also praised the music, the retro style graphics, and the amount of fan service. Destructoid said "it’s got a pretty bangin’ soundtrack". Nintendo Life also praised the music, describing it as a "particularly fantastic chiptune music." Igromania said if the game came out in the NES-era, it would have "taken one of the honorable places" in James Rolfe's collection, and from the fans' perspective, it has "the best fan service you could possibly imagine,” adding that it has a large number of references to web series. Nintendo World Report said that it "keeps true to the web series".

AVGN Adventures was criticized for its overly specific type of humor and the lack of fresh ideas in its short duration. The game reuses the same enemies with slightly different design in all levels, with Nintendo Life stating that the bosses were ambiguously appreciated. Critics were divided on the bosses. GameZone considered them to be the most complex and satisfying element of the game. Nintendo World Report and Game Informer both found AVGN Adventures to be difficult with satisfying elements, while also criticizing the repetitive attacks built on a simple pattern.

== Sequels ==
In 2015, FreakZone Games announced Angry Video Game Nerd II: ASSimilation. Initially, its release was planned for Winter 2015, but was delayed to March 29, 2016. A remastered version of the first two games, The Angry Video Game Nerd I & II Deluxe, was released on October 30, 2020, for Nintendo Switch and Steam, with ports for PlayStation 4 and Xbox One following in 2021. On Metacritic, The Angry Video Game Nerd I & II Deluxe received "generally favorable" reviews.
