= Doug Walker (comedian) =

American YouTuber and comedian (born 1981)

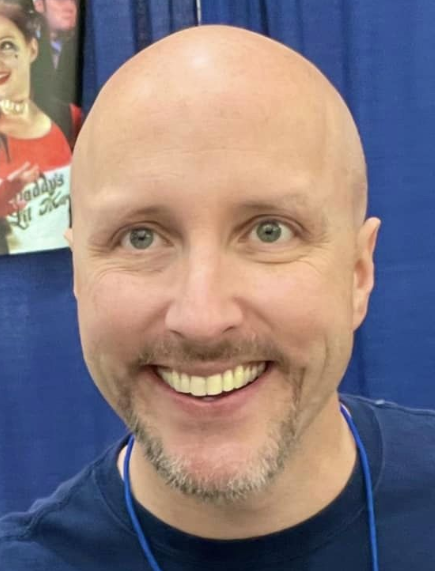
- Walker at the Grand Rapids Comic-Con in Grand Rapids, Michigan in 2022
- Born: Douglas Darien Walker; November 17, 1981 (age 44); Naples, Italy
- Education: Northern Illinois University (BA)
- Occupations: YouTuber; filmmaker; film critic; comedian; actor
- Years active: 2007–present
- Spouse: Robin Poage (m. 2012)

YouTube information
- Channel: Channel Awesome
- Years active: 2014–present
- Genre: Film reviews
- Subscribers: 1.43 million
- Views: 1.31 billion
- Last updated: August 19, 2026

Douglas Darien Walker (born November 17, 1981) is an American film critic, comedian, YouTuber, filmmaker, and actor. He is best known for creating and starring in the satirical film review series Nostalgia Critic, wherein the title character reviews nostalgic media in an exaggeratedly aggressive manner. After an initial run on YouTube, Walker co-created the website That Guy with the Glasses (later merged into Channel Awesome) in 2008, where he and the series gained wider popularity. The site also presented other media critics who created similar content, including Lindsay Ellis and Angry Joe. Walker and his series returned to YouTube in 2014.

== Early life and education ==
Walker was born Douglas Darien Walker on November 17, 1981, the son of Barney Walker (b. 1946), a naval officer and musician, and Sandra Ruth (née Polkow) Walker (1947–2016), a therapist. Both parents, as well as Walker's older brother Rob (b. 1979), would later appear regularly in his videos. Due to his father's career, Walker was born on a naval base in Naples, Italy, and moved frequently as a child, spending parts of his childhood in Rhode Island, Washington, and Jacksonville, Florida, before moving to the Chicago, Illinois area in his teen years.

Walker attended and graduated from Northern Illinois University, majoring in mass communication and minoring in visual art, also serving as an editor and cartoonist for the school newspaper.

== Nostalgia Critic ==
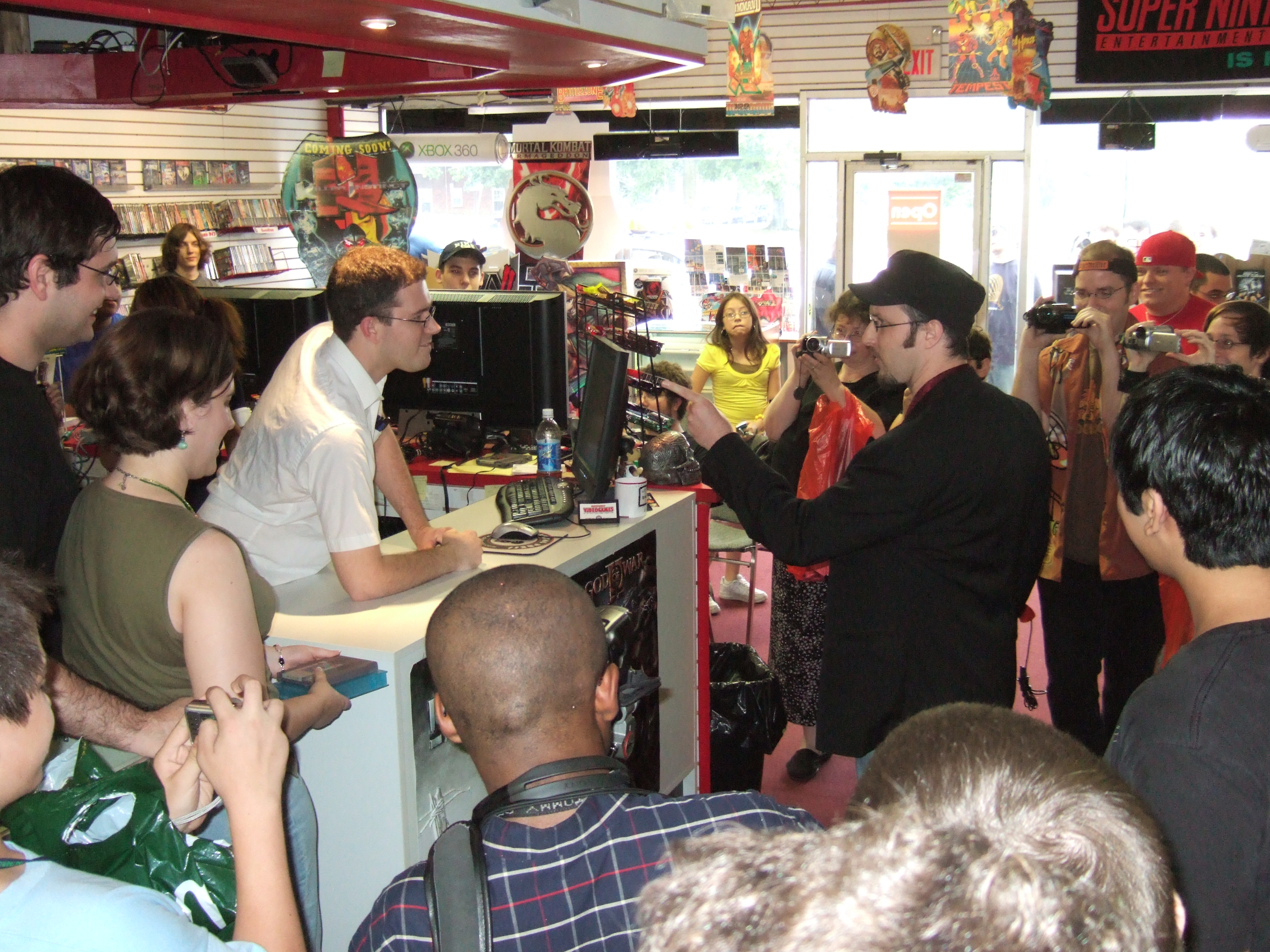
The Nostalgia Critic (right) with James Rolfe as the Angry Video Game Nerd

After graduating from college, Walker worked as an illustrator and janitor. He started making videos on the-then fairly new video-sharing site YouTube in his spare time. Although his early Nostalgia Critic videos were popular, Walker claims his rise to Internet fame first came from the success of his 5 Second Movies edits. Walker has stated that the Nostalgia Critic character is primarily inspired by Daffy Duck and the Queen of Hearts, as well as by comedians Lewis Black, Stephen Colbert, and Bill Murray.

In 2008, Walker moved his skits from YouTube to independent site That Guy With the Glasses, later renamed Channel Awesome, with videos hosted via Blip.tv. The majority of his skits have since been reuploaded to YouTube, and form a full web series spanning several seasons. Walker now works as a full-time content creator and staff member of Channel Awesome in Chicago, under the leadership of CEO Mike Michaud.

In September 2012, Walker announced that the Nostalgia Critic series would be ending and that he and his brother would create the sketch comedy web series Demo Reel. In January 2013, however, Walker released "The Review Must Go On", a short film announcing that the series would continue. The new incarnation would co-star Malcolm Ray and Rachel Tietz of Demo Reel, playing fictionalized versions of themselves as well as performing in sketches. Tamara Chambers would later join the series following Tietz's departure in 2014; following Chambers' departure in 2024, Heather Reusz joined the series as the new lead female cast member after being a supporting actress since 2016.

In March 2018, numerous former Channel Awesome contributors and employees accused the company of widespread mismanagement and mistreatment, culminating in the Twitter hashtag #ChangeTheChannel and a Google Doc entitled "Not So Awesome" chronicling the complaints of over 20 contributors. On August 2, 2021, Walker addressed the controversy in an interview with Korey Coleman on Double Toasted, admitting that Channel Awesome had gotten "too big" and thus resulted in poor communication among the staff and producers. Since then, they had been consciously trying to keep everything closer and more personal.

== Influences ==
Walker has cited many influences on his acting and style of comedy, including Monty Python, The Simpsons, Lewis Black, Tom and Jerry, Mel Brooks, South Park, Zucker, Abrahams and Zucker, Stephen Colbert, Jon Stewart, Rowan Atkinson, Bill Murray, Animaniacs, Louis C.K., Robin Williams, and especially Looney Tunes (particularly Daffy Duck).

== Personal life ==
Walker has been married to clinical social worker and therapist Robin Poage since 2012. In October 2025, Walker revealed he had been suffering from chronic fatigue syndrome since 2023, which was a result of getting shingles.

== Filmography ==
=== Film ===
Year	Title	Role	Notes
2010	Kickassia	Nostalgia Critic / Spider Smith / Chester A. Bum / Ask That Guy with the Glasses / Dominic	Also director, editor, executive producer, and writer
2011	Suburban Knights	Nostalgia Critic / Ask That Guy with the Glasses / Chester A. Bum	Also cinematographer, director, editor, executive producer, and writer
2012	To Boldly Flee	Nostalgia Critic / General Zod / Chester A. Bum / Ask That Guy with the Glasses / Soldier / Himself / Additional Voices	Also camera operator, director, editor, and writer
2013	Sonic	G.U.N. Soldier	Unofficial short film
2014	Angry Video Game Nerd: The Movie	Himself	Cameo
2015	Atop the Fourth Wall: The Movie	Dominic / Lori Prince / Nostalgia Critic	
2016	Room Full of Spoons	Himself	Documentary film
2017	Jesus, Bro!	Samuel Tobinski / Kendrick Tobinski	
2017	Disco	Rudy	
2019	Another Cinema Snob Movie	Bally Joe	
2022	Adam Heatherly's Frankenstein!	Professor William Barter	

=== Television ===
Year	Title	Role	Notes
2024	Smiling Friends	Daniel the Demon Slayer	Episode: "Erm, the Boss Finds Love?"

=== Web ===
Year	Title	Role	Notes
2007–present	Nostalgia Critic	Nostalgia Critic / Chester A. Bum / Devil Boner / ThatGuy / Raoul Puke / Melvin, Brother of the Joker / Various	Also director, writer, editor, and producer
2008–2016	Bum Reviews	Chester A. Bum	Also director, writer, editor, and producer
2008–2014	Ask That Guy with the Glasses	That Guy with the Glasses	Also director, writer, editor, and producer
2012–2013	Demo Reel	Donnie DuPre/Jimmy Boyd/Doug Walker/Nostalgia Critic	Also director, writer, editor, and producer
2010–present	The Cinema Snob	Nostalgia Critic / Chester A. Bum / Luigi / Christopher Walken's Arm / Ask That Guy with the Glasses	Also writer
2012; 2013	Joueur du Grenier	Nostalgia Critic	2 episodes
2014	Everything Wrong with...	Himself	Episode: How the Grinch Stole Christmas
2015	James and Mike Mondays	Himself	4 episodes
2016	Honest Trailers	Himself	Episode: Teenage Mutant Ninja Turtles: Out of Their Shells (feat. The Nostalgia Critic)
2018–2020	Cinemassacre	Himself / Nicolas Cage	6 episodes
2025	OneyPlays	Himself	Episode: "Slightly artistic with Doug Walker"

== Discography ==
Studio albums
Title	Album details
Nostalgia Critic's the Wall (Note: This album also featured other artists such as Corey Taylor and Rob Scallon.)	Released: September 8, 2019; Label: Self-released; Format: Digital download, streaming

=== Singles ===
Title	Song details
"The Real Chipmunks Movie" (Note: Credited as "Doug Walker & The Chipmunks".) (Note: Featured performers in the song include; James Jarosz, Rob Scallon, Tamara Chambers, Aiyanna Wade, and Heather Reusz.)	Released: July 3, 2016; Label: Self-released; Format: Digital download, streaming
