= Angry Video Game Nerd =

American retro gaming review comedy web series

- Logo used since 2007
- Also known as: AVGN; Bad NES Games; Angry Nintendo Nerd (Note: Abbreviated as AVGN; formerly Bad NES Games, which was used in episodes 1–2, in which there was no specific name, and Angry Nintendo Nerd, which was used for episodes 3–14.)
- Genre: Parody; Sketch comedy
- Created by: James Rolfe
- Written by: James Rolfe; Mike Matei
- Directed by: James Rolfe; Mike Matei
- Starring: James Rolfe; Mike Matei; Kyle Justin
- Theme music composer: Kyle Justin; James Rolfe
- Opening theme: "Angry Video Game Nerd Theme" by Kyle Justin
- Country of origin: United States
- Original language: English
- No. of seasons: 20
- No. of episodes: 236 (list of episodes)

Production
- Executive producers: James Rolfe; Mike Matei (2006–2020)
- Producer: James Rolfe
- Editor: James Rolfe
- Camera setup: Single-camera
- Running time: 3–72 minutes
- Production companies: Cinemassacre Productions; Screenwave Media

Original release
- Network: Cinemassacre.com (2004–present); YouTube (2006–present); Odysee (2021–2025); ScrewAttack (2007–13); GameTrailers (2007–13); Amazon Video (2018)
- Release: May 25, 2004 – present

Related
- Board James

Angry Video Game Nerd is an American retro gaming review comedy web series starring and created by James Rolfe. The series centers on titular skit character the Nerd, a foul-mouthed gamer who delivers commentary on retro games of poor quality. While the series began with Rolfe simply playing games while providing retrospective commentary, the show has grown in scope to encompass sketches featuring guest characters, reviews of gaming consoles and peripherals, and short lectures about video game history and culture.

Starting out as an amateur filmmaker, Rolfe intended his earliest videos of the character to be a joke, with no intentions of making them public. In May 2004, Rolfe, at the suggestion of future series producer Mike Matei, put the Angry Nintendo Nerd videos on his website, and in 2006 on the emerging video streaming platform YouTube, where it gained popularity. The series was soon renamed to the Angry Video Game Nerd to avoid trademark issues with Nintendo, and to allow Rolfe to review games from non-Nintendo consoles. From 2007 to 2011, the series entered a distribution deal with popular gaming websites ScrewAttack and GameTrailers.

Angry Video Game Nerd is considered one of the pioneers of internet review videos, being highly influential on the style and format of subsequent video reviewers as well as being responsible for helping to bring the concept into the mainstream. Various media review and sketch comedy entertainers have since cited the show as inspiration for their own material, such as JonTron, Doug Walker, Angry Joe, and Joueur du Grenier, among others.

The series became a cult success, and Rolfe began appearing as the character in various other media. In 2014, a film adaptation entitled Angry Video Game Nerd: The Movie was released; critical reception to the film was mixed. Multiple video games were made about the series, including Angry Video Game Nerd Adventures (2013), Angry Video Game Nerd II: ASSimilation (2016), Angry Video Game Nerd I & II Deluxe (2020), and Angry Video Game Nerd 8-bit (2025).

== Premise ==
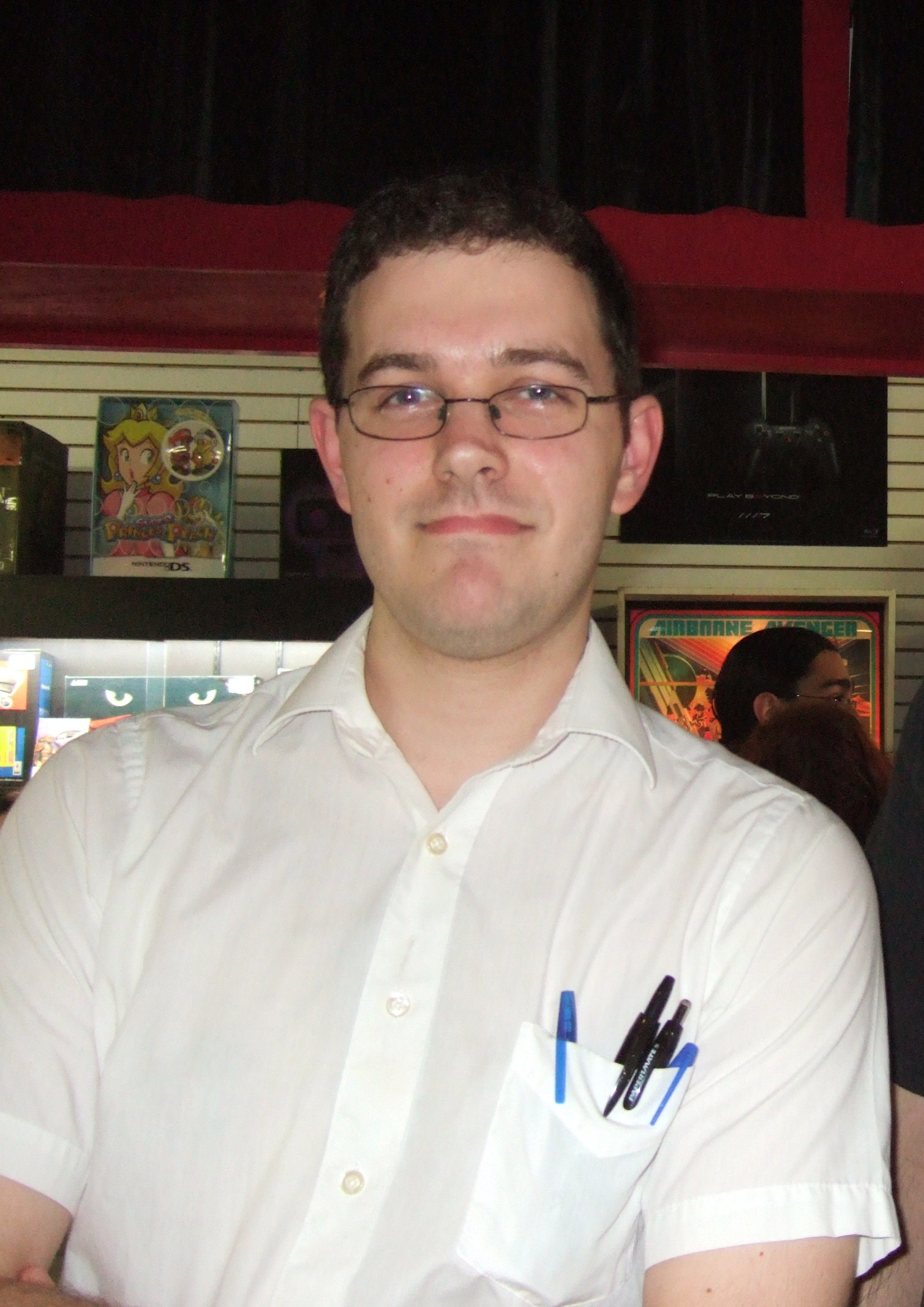
Series creator and star James Rolfe in-character as the Nerd in 2008

Angry Video Game Nerd revolves around the Nerd's commentary on shovelware and retro video games that he deems to be of particularly low quality, unfair difficulty, or poor design. Rolfe's character, "the Nerd", is a basement dweller, foul-mouthed video game collector who reviews old video games in a form reminiscent of insult comedies such as Mystery Science Theater 3000. The Nerd plays the game while picking apart its various technicalities, design flaws, and abnormalities in an effort to warn his viewers against playing the game. Other episodes have the Nerd reviewing consoles and peripherals, such as the CD-i and NES Accessories. The reviews often give the game's history and development, interspersed with sketches and comedic rants, among various other scripted elements. Sometimes the Nerd will give positive reviews for games while giving critiques, such as the Earthbound episode.

Dressed up as a stereotypical nerd, the Nerd reviews the game with his trademark glasses, white shirt with buttons, high khaki pants and loafers, while sometimes being bombarded by guest characters from video games and popular culture as well. These guests often provide additional commentary on the games, mock the Nerd's anguish, and act as parodies of the characters from which they had been derived. In response to them and to the games, the Nerd derives comic appeal from excessive and surrealistic use of fantasy scenarios, anger, and consumption of Rolling Rock beer while reviewing video games.

In many cases, the Nerd dresses up as other popular characters while reviewing their games, such as Batman and Indiana Jones. Other characters in the show include the Nerdy Turd (Note: Only appears in episode 68 (Odyssey)) and Shit Pickle, the Guitar Guy (played by Kyle Justin, co-writer of the show's theme song), and an assortment of others, while also the occasional guest appearance by other video game reviewers such as Pat the NES Punk, Doug Walker, and Scott Wozniak. The show has also had special guests, including Lloyd Kaufman of Troma Entertainment while the Nerd was playing various Toxic Crusaders-based games, Macaulay Culkin of Home Alone fame assisting the Nerd in playing games based on the movie series, and Gilbert Gottfried co-starring as a faux lead developer of Life of Black Tiger and the Nerd's arch-nemesis Fred "Fucks" (Fred Fuchs), while the Nerd reviews said game.

== Episodes ==
Season	Episodes	Originally released	
Season	Episodes	First released	Last released
0	2	May 25, 2004	June 15, 2004
1	15	April 8, 2006	December 23, 2006
2	24	January 25, 2007	January 22, 2008
3	23	February 19, 2008	January 27, 2009
4	25	March 16, 2009	March 6, 2010
5	11	April 30, 2010	March 3, 2011
6	6	April 6, 2011	December 7, 2011
7	11	July 24, 2012	December 19, 2013
8	16	March 19, 2014	December 22, 2014
Film		July 21, 2014	
9	5	March 26, 2015	December 22, 2015
10	5	April 6, 2016	December 20, 2016
11	12	March 23, 2017	December 22, 2017
12	9	April 25, 2018	December 15, 2018
13	11	January 23, 2019	December 11, 2019
14	12	January 15, 2020	December 15, 2020
15	13	March 15, 2021	December 21, 2021
16	6	March 17, 2022	December 22, 2022
17	6	February 24, 2023	December 22, 2023
18	9	February 25, 2024	December 20, 2024
19	8	February 24, 2025	December 18, 2025
20	8	February 6, 2026	TBA

== Production ==
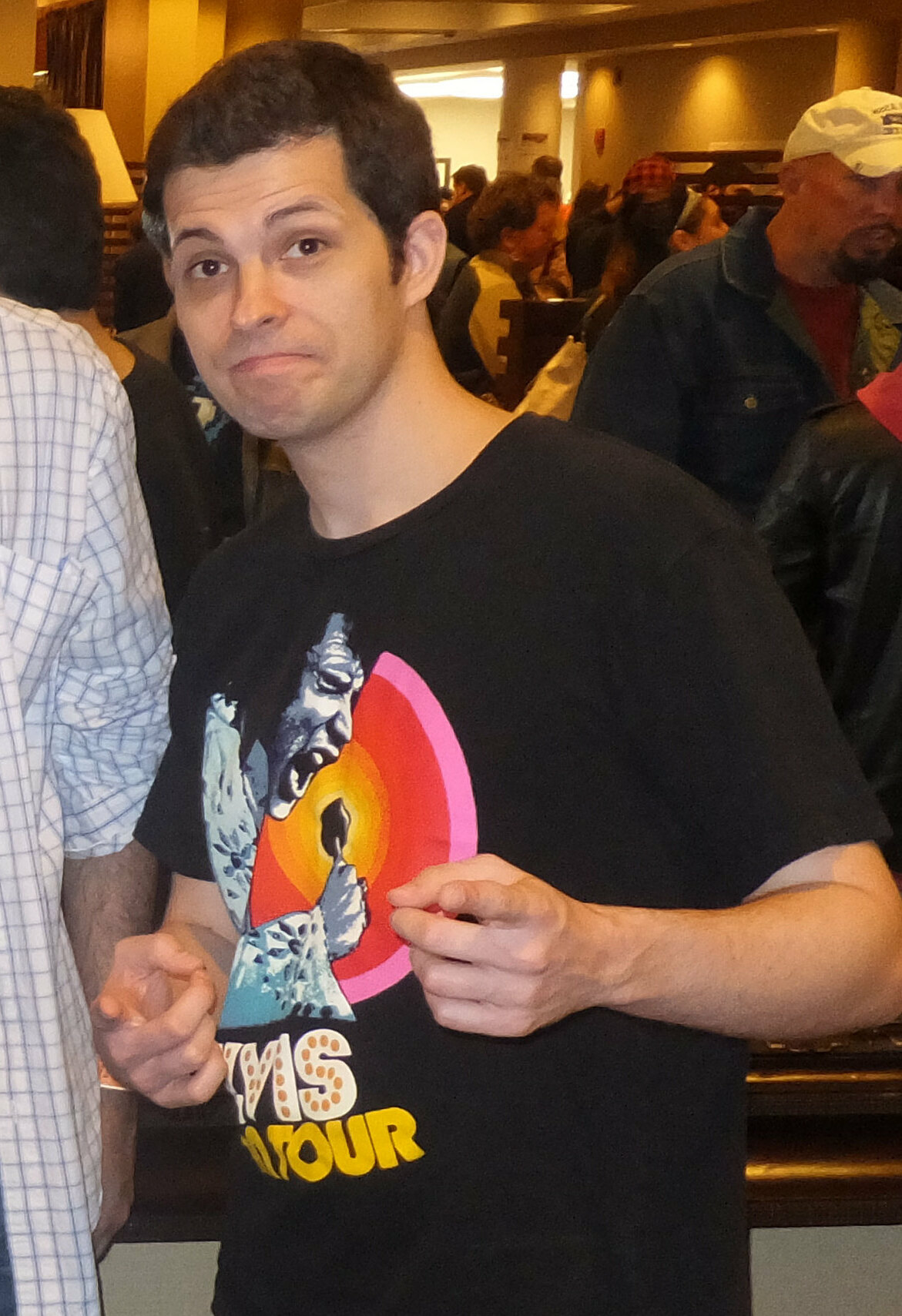
Rolfe's longtime friend Mike Matei (pictured in 2013) helped in producing the series until leaving Cinemassacre in 2020.

In May 2004, James Rolfe made the first two episodes, which were intended as "a little joke", with no intentions of making them public. Rolfe created his first on-camera game reviews, utilizing insult commentary with exaggerated bewilderment to two games—Castlevania II: Simon's Quest and Dr. Jekyll and Mr. Hyde—which would later become the signature of the Nerd character. At the time, the series was hastily titled Bad NES Games. Rolfe explained later in an interview for Daily News that the joke was just how upset one obsessive gamer could get over these games that were already 20 years old. Although the Dr. Jekyll and Mr. Hyde review was intended to be the last, Rolfe's friends, who enjoyed the previous "Bad NES Games" reviews, encouraged him to create another. Collaborative friend Mike Matei begged Rolfe to make more videos and according to Matei "eventually he caved." Matei would later help in producing and publishing the videos on Cinemassacre, Rolfe’s film production company. Rolfe previously released outside of the website as part of a four VHS tape set called the "Cinemassacre Gold Collection".

In 2006, Rolfe began making the episodes available on video streaming platform YouTube. Soon, he released a review of The Karate Kid game that was the first episode where Rolfe's character is introduced as "The Angry Nintendo Nerd". Naming these videos "The Angry Nintendo Nerd Trilogy", Rolfe posted them on Cinemassacre. Matei suggested the name "Angry Nintendo Nerd", which would later be changed to "Angry Video Game Nerd" to prevent trademark issues with Nintendo. Rolfe does almost all of the work for each episode. He diversified the reviews of platforms and products such as the Atari 2600, Super NES, Master System, and Sega Genesis video game consoles, the Power Glove and LaserScope peripherals, films such as The Wizard, and the Nintendo Power magazine. He would eventually branch out even further, reviewing games like Sonic '06 on the Xbox 360, and Big Rigs: Over the Road Racing on PC.

Angry Video Game Nerd first became a viral phenomenon in 2006, after Craig Skistimas of Rooster Teeth began posting the videos on his website ScrewAttack. The videos were also made available on video game news website GameTrailers. Rolfe's series received mainstream attention when his review of Teenage Mutant Ninja Turtles went viral on YouTube. In an article by writer Alex Carlson, he explained that before 2004, video gaming criticism was mostly reserved for the larger game magazines and websites. He said the opinions of the professional writers and journalists did not entirely correspond with the opinions of the average gamers, and that "everyone with a webcam and Fraps can now become a critic and don a characterized mentality, spouting profanities at will without getting censored." Since then, the show has increased substantially in quantity, production value, and fandom. Rolfe began infusing various episodes with emphasis on homemade special effects and narratives. The first of these cinematic episodes was a review of the 1989 Friday the 13th game in October 2006. To complement the episode's horror storyline—where Jason Voorhees assaults the Nerd for criticizing the game—Rolfe used different camera angles and lighting. Subsequent installments have fluctuated between standard gameplay critiques and narrative-driven episodes using a documentary style. When asked if the Nerd is going to make reviews in the current generation of video games, Rolfe replied that the "show is all about nostalgia," adding that he's "mostly a retro gamer."

In April 2010, Rolfe announced that he was suffering from burnout as a result of continuously making two episodes a month. This resulted in Rolfe cutting down to only making one episode each month. It also allowed Rolfe more time for other projects, including the Angry Video Game Nerd: The Movie. In September 2010, Rolfe announced the show would be put out of production for a short while so he could work on the movie. The show eventually resumed production in late summer 2012. Since then, he has self-released AVGN videos on his Cinemassacre website and YouTube account in a very sporadic manner in order to balance his personal life with the other projects he continuously works on.

By 2013, his YouTube account had garnered more than 900,000 subscribers and over 400 million views. In January 2013, the YouTube channel was suddenly shut down due to claims of severe violations of YouTube's terms of service. YouTube later reinstated the channel. In February 2014, Rolfe named the 100th episode, about R.O.B. the Robot, as one that he is proud of, with It taking him over 122 hours to complete. In 2014, he stated that the show "got popular right around when YouTube got popular."

In December 2020, Rolfe announced on the main Cinemassacre YouTube channel that longtime collaborator Mike Matei would be leaving the channel in order for Matei to focus on his Twitch career. In 2026, Matei said the EarthBound episode was "the best example of a great thing with a different style of video."

=== Music ===
"Angry Video Game Nerd Theme Song"
The beginning section of the show’s theme song. It emphasize the shows appeals to video game nostalgia, and its use of off-color humor

The opening song of the show, simply entitled "The Angry Video Game Nerd Theme Song", is a staple of the series since its earliest conception. It was written by Rolfe's friend Kyle Justin. Rolfe originally met Justin in college, which led him to be cast in Rolfe's projects. When AVGN started, Justin and Rolfe discussed the idea of doing a theme song. The song was first introduced in the M.C. Kids episode. Randy Miller of DVD Talk called the theme song "infamous". Over the years, the song had different variations to correspond with specials. Programmer and musician Lachlan Barclay published a soundtrack album based on the web series in 2011. Another compilation album was released in 2013 containing the music derived from the Angry Video Game Nerd Adventures video game. Developed also by FreakZone, the album was released by ScrewAttack Entertainment LLC as a digital download. An album based from the movie was released in 2014 composed by Bear McCreary, who had previously worked with Rolfe on the webseries Christmas special. The film's music was composed of rock-and-roll, heavy metal, a symphonic orchestra, and synthesized musical elements from various gaming systems such as NES, SNES, and Sega Genesis.

== Reception and legacy ==
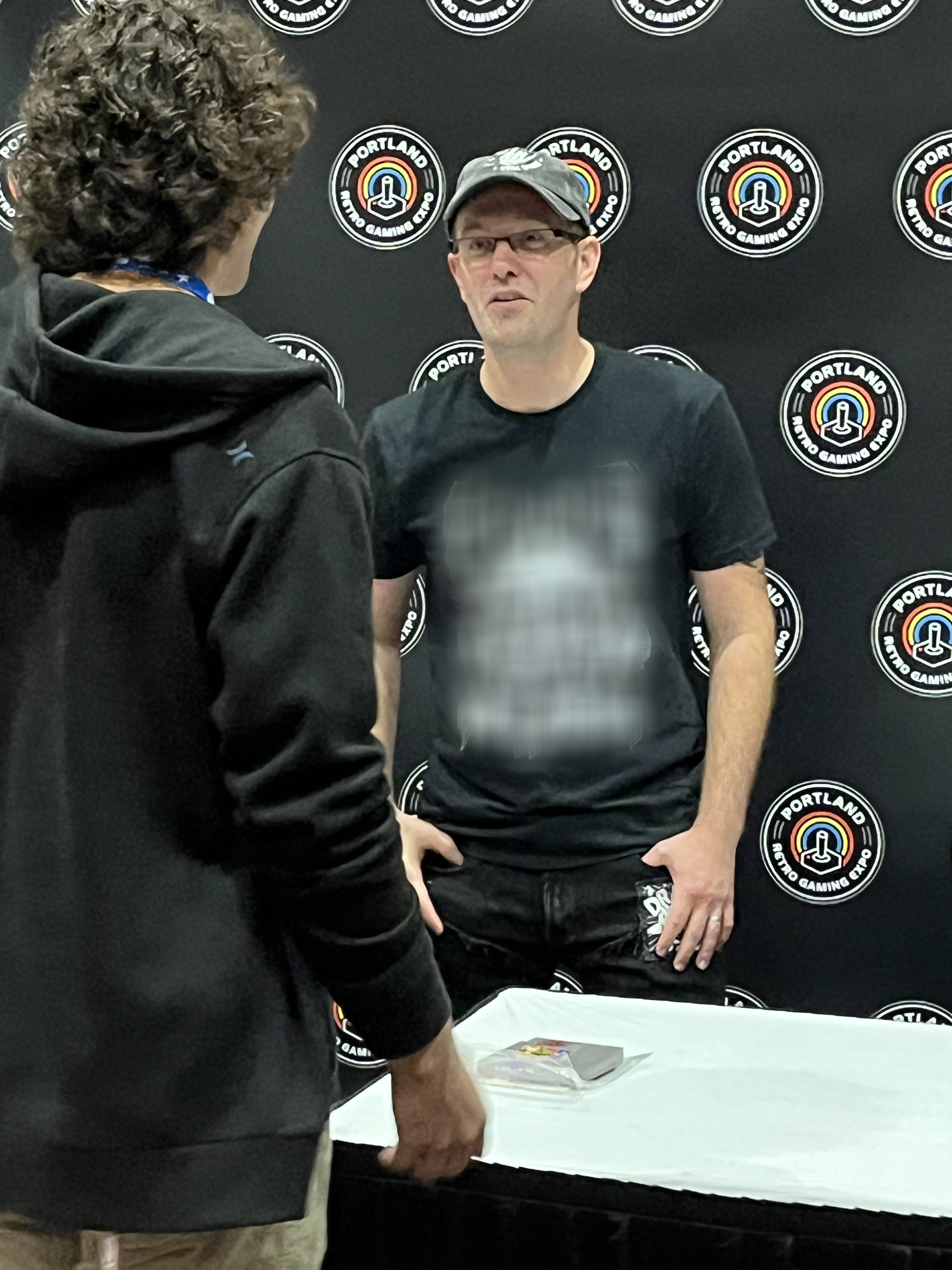
James Rolfe greeting a fan at the Portland Retro Gaming Expo in 2023

Angry Video Game Nerd made James Rolfe one of the most popular Internet celebrities even before the advent of YouTube. Angry Video Game Nerd was voted Best Online Web Series in Mashable's 3rd Annual Open Web Awards on December 16, 2009. Peggy Rajski describes the origin of the show's success stemming from the correct use of the internet as well as the crowdfunding system. Rajski further said that "[Rolfe] already cultivated an audience that cared about his prior work. When he asked them to step up, clearly they were willing to." Fellow filmmaker and internet celebrity Doug Walker dubbed the Nerd the "greatest video game critic of all time". Jacob Rich of Michigan Daily described the Nerd as the "pioneering internet 'gamer' show", adding that "pretty much every major game review show online today has 'AVGN' to thank for establishing its format". The 2009 French show Joueur du Grenier was based on Angry Video Game Nerd.

Poch Eulalia of Manila Bulletin said "Since his first video, James' channel has grown to become a mainstay among Internet pop culture." Zach Whalen described the show's presentation of retro gaming into contemporary gamers as "a process of looking back to an unattainable past and trying to bring that past into the present". Rolfe also commented during an interview with The Guardian of the show's impact in the current generation of the video game industry, saying that they "still relate to it and they like learning of the past". In the same article, reporter Luke Langlands also noted the show's influence of inspiring the creation of other independent online shows. The Nerd's success as an independent celebrity outside of the commercial mainstream of pop culture, popularized the notion of making lifelong careers online. In a survey published by Mediscape, a number of people admitted to being inspired by the Nerd to create and submit their own content in various online spaces, including YouTube, DeviantArt, SourceForge, GameFAQs and ScrewAttack, influencing the likes of those such as the Nostalgia Critic, Irate Gamer, Angry Joe, and JonTron, among others.

In his analysis of the show and the character, writer Alex Carlson of Hardcore Gamer dubbed Rolfe's character "The Nerd Who Changed Gaming Culture Forever". In his written article, he described the Angry Video Game Nerd as "one of the most recognizable figures in gaming culture". Carlson added that:

if you're a gamer, it's nearly guaranteed that you've browsed YouTube and seen at least a couple of videos from the series. Nearly a decade after the series' humble inception, James Rolfe's frequently sailor-mouthed alter-ego is still spreading influence. With each new gaming channel appearing on YouTube, there's some level of inspiration coming straight from The Nerd. From the very beginning, The Angry Video Game Nerd was a giant leap forward. Whether James Rolfe knew it or not, the rise of The Nerd was a moment that changed gaming critique and entertainment forever.

== Other media ==
In September 2006, Rolfe's review of the Back to the Future games was reported in an MTV segment called "Viral Videos Infect the Mainstream". On November 2, 2008, his videos and personality were featured on the nationally syndicated radio show Opie and Anthony. The Nerd has also become the subject of Howard Stern and David Arquette in an episode of Stern's SiriusXM show, in which Stern commented negatively on the show's format as well as the gaming community in general during a TooManyGames 2011 convention in Philadelphia. Rolfe himself appeared as the Nerd at various gaming and internet conventions. Both the Nerd and Doug Walker as the Nostalgia Critic made an unofficial background cameo appearance in the 2013 anime Unlimited Psychic Squad.

=== Film adaptation ===
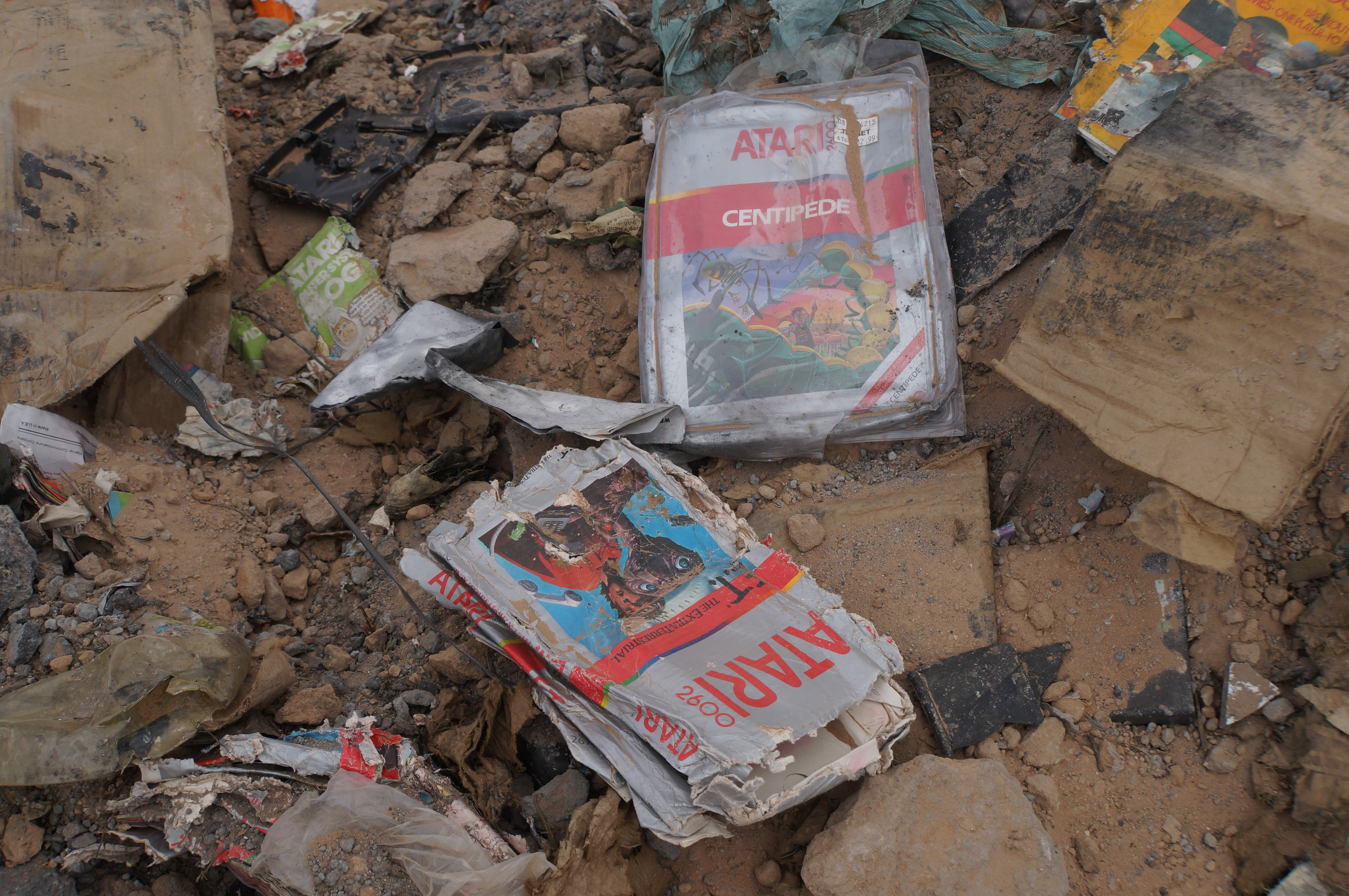
The film focuses on the Nerd trying to debunk the Atari video game burial.

On July 21, 2014, an independent film based on the series, entitled Angry Video Game Nerd: The Movie, was released online as well as limited theatrical releases, with DVD and Blu-ray versions released in September 2014. The film's plot focuses around the Nerd seeking to prove that over 1 million copies of the proclaimed "worst video game of all time", E.T. the Extra-Terrestrial for the Atari 2600, were not buried. In his quest to prove this to his fans, the Nerd is pursued by federal authorities who believe he is investigating Area 51 and the crash of an unidentified flying object.

The film began development in late 2006, following the popularity of the Angry Video Game Nerd web series, with James Rolfe serving as its director, producer, and co-writer, and reprising his on-screen role as The Nerd. The movie's script was designed to pay homage to the character finally reviewing the E.T. video game, though filming required Rolfe to balance his schedule with that of his online series and other works. The screenplay was completed by 2008, with the film's budget of more than US$300,000 raised entirely from crowdfunding. As part of its development, Rolfe asked for the show's fanbase to provide webcam footage of themselves fictionally reacting to the Nerd's webseries, to be used as an intro to the film. Over 30 artists worked on all the visual effects shots.

Although Rolfe has not ruled out the possibility of a sequel to the film, which would have involved the lost Swordquest treasures, he regards it as highly unlikely due to the amount of time spent developing and filming the Angry Video Game Nerd: The Movie and his focus on other film projects. It received mixed reviews from critics.

=== Video games ===
The Nerd appeared in the 2010 mobile video game Texting of the Bread produced by ScrewAttack. In April 2013, an official video game titled Angry Video Game Nerd Adventures was announced. Developed by FreakZone Games (creators of Manos: The Hands of Fate), it was released on September 20, 2013, on Microsoft Windows via Steam. The game follows the Nerd, playing a horrible game when suddenly, he is sucked into the Nerd's television set. The Nerd uses a NES Zapper as his main weapon. Throughout the game's 9 levels, each based around a certain style or gaming trope, he faces enemies with his Zapper. On July 12, 2014, it was announced that the game would also be released on Wii U and Nintendo 3DS. The Wii U version was released in North America on April 2, 2015, and released in Europe on December 10, 2015, with a 3DS version being available for the Nintendo eShop in June 2015. According to the review aggregator Metacritic, Angry Video Game Nerd Adventures received "Generally Favorable" based on a weighted average score of 77 out of 100 from 7 critic scores. A sequel, Angry Video Game Nerd II: ASSimilation was released. Originally due for release in Winter 2015, but delayed to March 29, 2016.

A remastered version of the first two games, The Angry Video Game Nerd I & II Deluxe, was released on October 30, 2020, for Nintendo Switch and Steam, with ports for PlayStation 4 and Xbox One following in 2021. On Metacritic, The Angry Video Game Nerd I & II Deluxe received "Generally Favorable" based on a score of 75 out of 100 from 13 critic scores. In October 2025, Angry Video Game Nerd 8-bit was released for the original NES, alongside modern platforms and personal computer through emulation, developed by Mega Cat Studios. On Metacritic, Angry Video Game Nerd 8-bit received "Generally Favorable" based on a score of 84 out of 100 from 5 critic scores.

=== Spin-off and other Cinemassacre content ===
Outside of the Angry Video Game Nerd, Rolfe and Matei would make additional content on the Cinemassacre channel, including Board James, You Know What’s Bullshit!?, and James & Mike Monday. In 2014, Rolfe would release a Christmas special, The 12 Days of Shitsmas, in which the Nerd reviews twelve of his most requested games.

== Home media ==
=== VHS, DVD, and Blu-ray ===
==== Web series ====
Year	Title	Medium	Episodes
2004	Cinemassacre Gold Collection	VHS	1–2
2007	Angry Video Game Nerd, volume 1	DVD	1–17
2008	Angry Video Game Nerd, volume 2	DVD	18–39
2009	Angry Video Game Nerd, volume 3	DVD	40–62
2010	Angry Video Game Nerd, volume 4	DVD	63–84
2011	Angry Video Game Nerd, volume 5	DVD	85–97
2012	Angry Video Game Nerd, volume 6	DVD	98–107
2013	Angry Video Game Nerd, volume 7	DVD	108–114
2015	Angry Video Game Nerd, volume 8	DVD	115–121
2016	Angry Video Game Nerd, volume 9	DVD	122–139
2015	Angry Video Game Nerd: X Collection	Blu-ray	1–100
2017	Angry Video Game Nerd: X2 Collection	Blu-ray	101–114
2017	Angry Video Game Nerd: X3 Collection	Blu-ray	115–140
2018	Angry Video Game Nerd: Ready 4 Revenge	Blu-ray	141–147
2020	Angry Video Game Nerd: BFG Collection	Blu-ray	1–164
2022	Angry Video Game Nerd: BFG Disc 9	Blu-ray	165–187
2024	Angry Video Game Nerd: BFG Disc 10	Blu-ray	188–206

==== Film ====
Year	Title	Medium
2014	Angry Video Game Nerd: The Movie	DVD and Blu-ray

=== Music ===
Year	Title
2011	The Angry Video Game Nerd Collection
2013	Angry Video Game Nerd Adventures (soundtrack)
2014	Angry Video Game Nerd: The Movie (Original Motion Picture Soundtrack)
2022	The Angry Video Game Album

=== Video games ===
Year	Title
2013	Angry Video Game Nerd Adventures
2016	Angry Video Game Nerd II: ASSimilation
2020	Angry Video Game Nerd I & II Deluxe
2025	Angry Video Game Nerd 8-bit

== See also ==
- Nostalgia Critic, a similar comedy-based web series instead focused on retro films, whose creator (Doug Walker) frequently collaborated with Rolfe.
- Scott the Woz, a similar comedy-based web series about video games and gaming history.

== Notes ==
Achievements
Preceded by JumbaFund	Most Subscribed Channel on YouTube; Ranked 45th as of 2010	Succeeded by ImprovEverywhere
Preceded by JumbaFund	Most Subscribed Director on YouTube; Ranked 14th as of 2010	Succeeded by ImprovEverywhere
