= Channel Awesome =

American online media production company

Channel Awesome, Inc.
- Industry: Online media
- Founded: April 2008; 18 years ago (as That Guy with the Glasses)
- Founders: Mike Michaud; Bhargav Dronamraju; Mike Ellis
- Headquarters: Lombard, Illinois, United States
- Key people: Mike Michaud; (CEO); Doug Walker; (actor and presenter); Rob Walker; (COO and screenwriter)
- Revenue: $150,000 (2009)
- Website: http://channelawesome.com (archived)

Channel Awesome, Inc. is an American online media production company based in Lombard, Illinois. The company was founded in 2008 by Mike Michaud, Mike Ellis, and Bhargav Dronamraju. Channel Awesome operated the That Guy with the Glasses website (often abbreviated TGWTG) until late 2014, when it was phased into the Channel Awesome website. The site is best known for the comedic film review series Nostalgia Critic, starring Doug Walker.

That Guy with the Glasses previously hosted the fellow channels Bar Fiesta (beginning in November 2009) and Blistered Thumbs (beginning in November 2010). Channel Awesome currently hosts a YouTube channel of the same name with an emphasis on content produced by Doug Walker and his brother Rob. All of Channel Awesome's content was hosted by Blip or YouTube prior to the former's shutdown in August 2015. After a series of scandals, nearly all affiliated creators severed ties with Channel Awesome and departed in April 2018.

== Origins ==
Mike Michaud, Mike Ellis, and Bhargav Dronamraju created Channel Awesome after they were laid off from Circuit City in 2007. The three discussed the idea of such a company while still employed, but their dismissal was the impetus to put their plans into action. Michaud has stated that "if [they] didn't lose our jobs, [the business] wouldn't have happened anytime soon".

At around the same time, Doug Walker began posting several satirical video reviews of films and other media on YouTube under the screen name of "Nostalgia Critic". Initially, Walker viewed making the videos as a side hobby, rarely interacting with his fans. Walker's channel had its content withdrawn from YouTube following complaints from 20th Century Fox and Lionsgate over alleged copyright infringement. Walker attempted to re-upload his content by assigning each video a new, separate channel. However, due to continuing issues, Walker decided to leave YouTube altogether and create the website That Guy with the Glasses, with Michaud acting as webmaster.

== That Guy with the Glasses ==
That Guy with the Glasses was launched in April 2008. It showcased satirical reviews of movies, television shows, music, comic books and video games. The website was built around the work of Walker, including Nostalgia Critic (comedic recaps of bad movies), 5 Second Movies (hyper-edited feature films), Ask That Guy with the Glasses (a comedy question and answer show) and Bum Reviews (humorous plot summaries of theatrical releases). Other videos and written articles were hosted on the site, including some minor series and sketches starring Walker. Videos were primarily hosted by Blip after problems with earlier provider Revver. The website featured videos from a number of other content creators who were steadily added as contributors over the course of several years.

In December 2008, Walker appeared in a commercial for the PBS documentary Make 'Em Laugh: The Funny Business of America, performing a series of brief imitations of famous comedians, from Charlie Chaplin to Stephen Colbert. In 2009, Doug and Rob Walker, along with Brian Heinz, produced an iRiff of The Lion King for RiffTrax. In March 2009, the iRiff was chosen as the winner of the website's RiffTrax Presents contest. The performers received $1,000 and, with instruction from Michael J. Nelson, Kevin Murphy, and Bill Corbett, recorded a commentary for the film Batman Forever.

Nostalgia Critic averaged 100,000 to 300,000 viewers per week while on the site, and one million page views per month. This was expected to increase following Blip's deal with YouTube in July 2009. As of July 2009, the site earned more than $10,000 per month in advertising revenue and received more than $11,000 in online donations. In the third quarter of the 2009 fiscal year, Walker's shows earned $53,000, including $32,000 from Nostalgia Critic alone. This revenue was generated by run of network from Puma and Starburst. The success of his shows has allowed Walker to make a living performing and to quit his previous job as an illustrator, as well as pay the salary of Ellis, the site's co-founder and COO. The site was featured in Entrepreneur magazine in December 2009 where the history of the site was discussed as well as the plans for the future.

A "team shot" of Channel Awesome producers with the president of the Republic of Molossia Kevin Baugh, c. the 2010 filming of their 2nd anniversary feature-length special Kickassia

During 2011, Michaud was looking for warehouse space in suburban Chicago. He told The New York Times, "My company has a lot of growing up to do, but I believe that sometime in the next one to two years someone will create that one series that gets everyone talking... [and attract audiences] to the endless options of online video." As of June 2011, the company employed seven full-time staff. According to Walker, "these people are cheap to get because we are happy to see any amount of money". Channel Awesome's ability to attract a significant audience with a low expenditure was proclaimed to have an effect on video entertainment production.

The site gained a wealth of personalities and shows, quickly reaching twenty-plus. The first time the producers made an initiative to put each other in the same fictional universe (or "Reviewaverse", as was coined by one of its former producers) was with their first anniversary video, which was a twenty-minute fight between each other, with set up and dialogue only stating it was video game reviewers vs. movie reviewers, egged on by the Nostalgia Critic and Angry Video Game Nerd rivalry that had been going at the time. A full-length site crossover movie was decided for the next year's anniversary. It ended up being a trilogy: Kickassia, which had the plot of the Critic getting a number of the personalities together to take over a micronation in Nevada called Molossia; Suburban Knights, where the Critic got together much of the same personalities to find a mystical gauntlet via forced LARPing; and To Boldly Flee, where the Critic and TGWTG's cast travel to space to stop a cosmic anomaly and fight corporate villains.

On June 28, 2012, Channel Awesome content producers Walker, Lindsay Ellis (The Nostalgia Chick; no relation to Mike Ellis), Brad Jones (The Cinema Snob) and Todd Nathanson (Todd in the Shadows) signed exclusivity deals with Blip, which directly hosted most TGWTG and Channel Awesome programming until it was shut down in August 2015. The deal did not affect the appearance of the producers' videos on TGWTG, and would assist the increase of budget of the four series, as well as provide technical improvements. An extension of this deal was a Blip-run YouTube channel called "League of Super Critics", which also uploaded the unedited videos of all four producers, with the exception of Jones, whose videos were edited down from the original version so that the only way one could see the full video was to go to Blip.

On December 3, 2014, the site shut down and rebranded itself as ChannelAwesome.com. The old URL redirected to ChannelAwesome.com until June 2018, where it now redirects to the Channel Awesome YouTube channel.

== Subdivisions ==
Channel Awesome expressed plans to build on the success of That Guy with the Glasses with a network of subdivisions of the Channel Awesome website, including Bar Fiesta for covering Chicago entertainment and nightlife, and Inked Reality for anime and comic books. Blistered Thumbs began in 2009 as a subdivision of That Guy with the Glasses for housing its video game content. It gained popularity and Blistered Thumbs launched as its own website on November 4, 2010.

Joe Vargas (Angry Joe), already an established video game reviewer on That Guy with the Glasses, was the initial editor-in-chief. Staff writers were drawn from various websites including That Guy with the Glasses, TechRaptor and Normal Boots. Austin Yorski eventually replaced Vargas as editor-in-chief.

In late November 2014, the Blistered Thumbs website was shut down.

== ChannelAwesome.com ==
The new Channel Awesome website debuted in late 2014. All content from TGWTG was relocated to the newly established ChannelAwesome.com. Each week there is a Spotlight Section to promote a website producer, as well as a Featured Blogger.

In January 2015, four of the site's long-time associates departed, including Andrew Dickman, Kyle Kallgren (Oancitizen), Allison Pregler (Obscurus Lupa) and Phelan Porteous (Phelous). Dickman, Porteous and Pregler went to being exclusively on Phelan's site, Phelous.com, while Kyle went to producing videos exclusively for Chez Apocalypse. Later that same month, Lindsay Ellis ended her long-running show The Nostalgia Chick, which had premiered as a companion show to Nostalgia Critic in September 2008. She intended to continue producing videos for League of Super Critics on YouTube and her own website, Chez Apocalypse.

Noah Antwiler, and his reviewer persona "The Spoony One", went to being exclusively on his site, The Spoony Experiment, a little before the fourth anniversary film, but still had a prominent role in it with his consent.

As of January 2024, the website has been deactivated, with the URL redirecting to the Channel Awesome YouTube channel where new content is instead being uploaded to.

== Long-running shows ==
=== Nostalgia Critic ===
Nostalgia Critic is the most popular video series created by Doug Walker, in which he plays the titular reviewer. The show is written by him and his brother Rob Walker. The series was initially launched on YouTube before moving to Blip TV in 2008. It is the flagship show for Channel Awesome, which has since built on it with additional content, additional websites and the spin-off show Nostalgia Chick.

=== The Angry Joe Show ===
Jose "Angry Joe" Antonio Vargas hosted the leading video game review show on the site. It generally consisted of reviews by Vargas stating his honest opinions of current releases of video games, mixed with sketch comedy. In April 2018, Vargas announced his departure from the Channel Awesome website.

=== Todd in the Shadows ===
Todd in the Shadows is a music review show created and presented by Todd Nathanson. The show's primary focus is on its three main series: Todd's Pop Song Reviews, in which Nathanson reviews songs that, at the time of review, were or had recently been high-charting; One Hit Wonderland, in which he examines and chronicles the careers of one-hit wonders; and Trainwreckords, in which he analyzes albums considered to have "ended [the] thriving careers" of their respective artists. Cinemadonna, in which Nathanson reviews Madonna's feature filmography, was one of the show's main series until its conclusion in 2016. In the show, Nathanson keeps his appearance anonymous, filming himself in silhouette while sitting at an electronic keyboard in a dark room. When his face is not in silhouette, he covers its upper half with a black cloth.

Nathanson debuted the series in 2009 and joined That Guy with the Glasses the following year. In March 2018, he announced his departure from Channel Awesome on his Twitter account.

In 2023, Nathanson released a video where he accused James Somerton of regularly lying and spreading misinformation.

=== The Cinema Snob ===
The Cinema Snob stars Brad Jones as a pretentious art critic who watches and comments on a wide variety of films, including exploitation films, religious films, and pornography. His association with Channel Awesome began with "E.T. The Porno" (January 7, 2010). Like many other shows on Channel Awesome, Jones started his show on YouTube until he was confronted with a copyright claim from the filmmakers of Nail Gun Massacre. Jones has also created additional shows for Channel Awesome, including Brad Tries and Midnight Screenings. Two films based on the Cinema Snob, The Cinema Snob Movie and Another Cinema Snob Movie, were released in 2012 and 2019, respectively.

== Activism ==
On December 5, 2009, the company held a donation drive for the Ronald McDonald House Charities. The donation drive lasted upwards of seven hours and raised $26,400. During the event, calls were taken, prizes were awarded to people who donated large sums of money and videos featuring the talent on the site were aired. The donation drive was extended a few more days making the grand total $32,200.

On December 15, 2011, Lindsay Ellis posted a video about Channel Awesome staff traveling to Washington, D.C. to lobby members of Congress about the Stop Online Piracy Act and the PROTECT IP Act. Ellis, Michaud, Rob Walker, and content producers Noah Antwiler (The Spoony One), Kyle Kallgren (Oancitizen and Brows Held High), Lewis Lovhaug (Linkara), Todd Nathanson (Todd in the Shadows), Paul Schuler (Paw Dugan) and Joe Vargas (Angry Joe) all traveled to Washington, D.C. to represent Channel Awesome and support freedom of speech on the internet.

== Management controversies ==
=== Initial allegations ===
Between October 2014 and January 2015, several long-time content producers departed from Channel Awesome. In March 2018, several former producers alleged, via a series of Twitter posts, mismanagement and mistreatment by members of Channel Awesome's upper management, including the Walker brothers and Michaud. The allegations included a history of sexist behavior toward female producers as well as a history of unprofessional, aggressive and immature behavior towards other content creators by Michaud, incompetence by the Walker brothers during production of the company's anniversary films, and failure to communicate with producers about significant decisions affecting them. One such allegation from Lindsay Ellis stated that during production on the film To Boldly Flee, she was repeatedly pressured into looping a scene in which her character was implied to be raped off-screen by Lewis Lovhaug's character. She further alleged that due to her and Lovhaug's protests over the scene's content, Doug Walker rewrote it so the implication of assault was less implicit. Ellis said that she was forced to perform the scene under intimidation.

In March and April 2018, several more producers—including Lovhaug (Linkara), Todd Nathanson (Todd in the Shadows), Daren Jackson (Rap Critic) and Mike Jeavons (MikeJ)—departed from Channel Awesome.

=== Further departures ===
On April 2, 2018, a group of former Channel Awesome contributors and employees publicly released a document, entitled "Not So Awesome", via Google Drive. The document compiled grievances against the company, both those that had been previously made and ones that had not yet been publicly known. Over twenty former producers and employees, along with two individuals whose identities were kept anonymous, provided various allegations in the document, including poor communication and management, verbal abuse and bullying, and sexual harassment and misconduct. The subsequent response from Channel Awesome was criticized by fans and the company's former producers, as they felt the company was not apologizing or taking responsibility for their wrongdoings.

On that and the following days, more producers, including Omar Ahmed (Yomarz), Nash Bozard, Mathew Buck (Film Brain), Tony Goldmark (Some Jerk with a Camera), Elisa Hansen (Maven), Brian Heinz (The Last Angry Geek), Leeman Kessler (Ask Lovecraft), Heather McDonald (Calluna), Dominic Smith (The Dom), Luke Spencer (Rocked) and Chris Stuckmann, left Channel Awesome, with some citing their dissatisfaction with the company's response to the controversy as their reason for doing so, lowering the number of producers for the website from forty to about ten by April 5. Channel Awesome's planned tenth anniversary was cancelled as a result of the controversy.

=== Second response and fallout ===
On April 11, 2018, Channel Awesome released a second response to the allegations as a blog post on its website. Titled "Our Response", the post was intended to refute the "most egregious" of the allegations made by former producers, Holly Brown and Jane Doe, who are described within it as "disgruntled individuals with vindictive intentions".

Within 48 hours of the response's posting, nearly all of Channel Awesome's remaining producers, including long-time veterans Joe Vargas (Angry Joe), Bennett White (Bennett the Sage) and Lawrence Simpson (MasakoX), as well as Gaming Wildlife, Bargain Boy, Ryan Molina (Battle Geek Plus), Timid Jester, DToons Productions (maker of the series Toons These Days) and Eric Rodriguez (Blockbuster Buster), also left the website.

Since April 14, 2018, the website listed two remaining producers apart from the Walkers: Brad Jones (Cinema Snob) and Larry Bundy Jr. (Guru Larry); the latter stated that among his reasons for remaining were that "no one ever actually believed [he] was ever on TGWTG". On February 16, 2024, Bundy Jr. announced on Twitter that he was kicked off Channel Awesome. However, this was due to the website having been deactivated since January 2024.

On August 2, 2021, Doug Walker acknowledged the controversy in an interview with Korey Coleman on Double Toasted. He admitted that Channel Awesome had gotten "too big" and thus resulted in poor communication among the staff and producers. Since then, they had been consciously trying to keep everything closer and more personal.
