= Nostalgia Critic =

American review comedy web series

- Genre: Review/rant; Sketch comedy; Surreal humor; Dark comedy; Insult comedy; Satire; Parody
- Created by: Doug Walker
- Developed by: Doug Walker; Rob Walker
- Written by: Doug Walker; Rob Walker
- Directed by: Doug Walker; Rob Walker
- Starring: Doug Walker; Rob Walker; Rachel Tietz; Malcolm Ray; Tamara Chambers; Jim Jarosz; Walter Banasiak; Heather Reusz; Aiyanna Wade
- Theme music composer: Michael "Skitch" Schiciano
- Opening theme: "The Review Must Go On" (2013–present)
- Ending theme: "Nostalgia Critic Anthem" (2010-2012) "The Review Must Go On" (2011; 2013–present); Various
- Country of origin: United States
- Original language: English
- No. of seasons: 19
- No. of episodes: 826

Production
- Executive producer: Michael Michaud
- Producer: Doug Walker
- Production locations: Downers Grove, Illinois (2007–12; 2020–21; 2023; 2024–present); Lombard, Illinois (2013–2020; 2021–2023; 2023–2024)
- Editor: Doug Walker
- Camera setup: Single-camera
- Running time: Various (avg. 15–30 minutes)
- Production company: Channel Awesome

Original release
- Network: YouTube (2007–08; 2012–present); Blip (2008–15); Vessel (2016); Vidme (2016–17); Vimeo (2017–19) (Note: From November 14, 2017 Bangarang (2017) to January 29, 2019 The Black Cauldron (1985).)
- Release: July 3, 2007 – present

Nostalgia Critic is an American review comedy web series created, directed by, and starring comedian Doug Walker. The series initially launched on YouTube on July 3, 2007, before moving to Walker's own site, That Guy with the Glasses, and finally to the online production company Channel Awesome. The show follows Walker as the title character, a bitter and sarcastic film critic who reviews films and television shows, often those generally considered to be of poor quality, usually with comically exaggerated hysteria. Reviews often also incorporate comedic sketches, rants, or embedded storylines.

Walker briefly retired the series on August 14, 2012, to work on other projects, even writing the character out of existence in the Channel Awesome film To Boldly Flee. On January 22, 2013, Walker announced the show's return in a narrative video titled The Review Must Go On. The show subsequently returned with a more narrative- and sketch-driven sixth season, beginning on February 5, 2013, with a review of The Odd Life of Timothy Green. Most episodes still retain the original format.

== Premise ==
The series focuses on the Nostalgia Critic, a short-tempered film reviewer looking back at films usually from his childhood and adolescence. GigaOM describes it as "high energy and shamelessly nerdy". Reuters described him as having "offbeat personalities". In each episode, the Critic restates important plot-points, guiding the viewer, while making jokes out of notable or questionable scenes. The reviews are interspersed with recurring memes, false or satirical dubbing of dialogue, comedic sketches and pop culture gags—such as making fun of famous actors who starred in lesser-known roles before their rise to fame. The show also features special episodes, such as the "Top 11" list countdowns for his favorite or least favorite films, villains or moments in television shows, and "Old vs. New", which compares the reboot of a popular film or series to the original.

Since the revival of the series in 2013, Walker occasionally produces an editorial which discusses relevant film topics; while still featuring the Critic persona, these videos are much less comedic and contain no sketches or other actors. Beginning with Jurassic World on June 23, 2015, the series also occasionally features "clipless reviews" of films that are still currently in theaters to avoid copyright infringement instead of stills and clips. These reviews instead feature scenes from the movies comedically re-enacted by Walker, his friends and family, other Channel Awesome contributors, and other people associated with Walker.

Walker describes his philosophy thus: "[We need a critic of nostalgia] because everybody already does it. When we look at movies and shows from our youth, they're rarely as good as we remember them, and oftentimes it's quite humorous to compare what you liked then to what you like now. That's basically what the Nostalgia Critic is about, looking back at just how much nostalgia cloaked our vision in heavenly bliss and how bizarre the reality is."

== Cast and characters ==
- Doug Walker as The Nostalgia Critic, an aggressive, childish, foul-mouthed and hot-tempered film critic and a fictionalized version of Doug Walker himself. He is characterized by his angry rants, shrill voice and hatred of bad movies. All of the reviews star him as the main character and feature him providing commentary and criticism while talking directly to the audience. While often making jokes at the film's expense, Doug will often provide serious criticism and occasionally express his views on something relating to the film. Doug's other characters include both his past and future selves; Chester A. Bum, a homeless man; Devil Boner, the polite but insane embodiment of evil; Raoul Puke, a parody of Raoul Duke, the alter ego of Hunter S. Thompson; and parodies of Optimus Prime, General Zod, Rick Sanchez, Casper the Friendly Ghost, Frank Miller, and Michael Bay.
- Rob Walker as Rob, which is Doug Walker's older brother and has made appearances in videos since before the introduction of live-action sketches. Credited as "The Other Guy", Rob will often act as a straight man to other characters antics, though he has moments of absurdity on some occasions. Rob portrays some recurring characters, notably Santa Christ (a combination of Santa Claus and Jesus Christ) and Chart Guy, Rob has portrayed minor characters and acted in sketches. He has also co-directed several episodes of the show.
- Malcolm Ray as Malcolm, which is one of the Critic's friends who appears on the show and works with him on his videos. Malcolm's character often falls victim to the Critic's abuse, alongside his co-star Tamara, and both usually drive the plots relating to the review. Malcolm plays secondary characters in many of the sketches, most notably as the Devil, an African-American version of Willy Wonka called Black Willy Wonka, hitman Bennie, and parodies of Pinhead, M. Night Shyamalan, and Barack Obama.
- Rachel Tietz as Rachel, which is a friend of the Critic and Malcolm. She portrays multiple characters, including Evilina (the daughter of Satan and Kim Kardashian) and Rita Repulsa. She left the show after season seven, but has made some cameos in later episodes.
- Tamara Chambers as Tamara. After Rachel left the show to pursue a career in Los Angeles, Tamara stepped in to take her place as a regular cast member. Tamara's character often falls victim to the Critic's abuse, alongside her costar Malcolm, and both usually drive the plots relating to the review. She plays two recurring characters: Hyper Fangirl, who becomes the girlfriend and later wife of Doug's Devil Boner character, and Malice, a violent parody of the titular character from Alice's Adventures in Wonderland. Chambers revealed in a Reddit post that she left the show full-time in 2024, after being a part of the cast for over a decade, as she had decided to pursue other acting projects. However, on a Channel Awesome live Q&A, despite not being a full-time member of the cast anymore, Walker revealed that Chambers is open to occasional future collaborations with Channel Awesome, including a later appearance in the 2025 video "Commercials Strikes Again".
- Jim Jarosz as Jim, which is a friend of the Critic who often works with Tamara and Malcolm, though he is not present in every episode. He is responsible for most of the props and set pieces in the show, most notably for the review of Mad Max: Fury Road. His two main roles are the condescending therapist from Catwoman and Harvey Levin, the lisping flamboyant crossdressing head of TMZ.
- Walter Banasiak as Walter, which is one of the hosts of Awesome Comics & Coffee, and Fanscription, 2 other shows on Channel Awesome, alongside Jim and Heather Reusz. He also created the show Top 5, in which he counts down his Top 5 favorite or least favorite things. He also runs Bat-May, in which he reviews episodes from Batman: The Animated Series during the month of May, and Twilight-Tober Zone, in which he reviews episodes of The Twilight Zone during the month of October. His main roles are Father Venkman, a man obsessed with Ghostbusters to the point of making an entire religion surrounding it, and a parody of Zack Snyder, who is often seen with Doug's Michael Bay parody.
- Heather Reusz as Heather, besides starring alongside the cast in Nostalgia Critic skits, helps run the Twitch channel, where the cast play video games, watch movies, or chat with the audience. She often filled in for Tamara, and following Tamara's departure from the full-time Channel Awesome cast, Heather has since become the main female actor in the Nostalgia Critic skits.
- Aiyanna Wade as Aiyanna, who was a featured panelist on Awesome Comics and was one of the co-hosts the Orbit Report with Heather Reusz as well as the Top 5 Best/Worst with Heather and Walter.
- Orlando Belisle Jr. as Orlando, which is a friend of the Critic who often works with him. His main characters are Peter Souless, a parody of money-hungry studio executives; Roger, an angel-in-training that "helps" the Critic in the 2010 Christmas special You're a Dirty Rotten Bastard; and The Angst, a parody of 1990s and 2000s anti-heroes. He has also played Malachite, the main villain of the 2011 anniversary special Suburban Knights.
- Barney Walker as Doug and Rob's father, who helps out behind the scenes and often appears as himself. Pre-reboot episodes portrayed him as abusive towards the Critic.
- Chaplin & Buster as Doug Walker's two pet cats, who appear as talking versions of themselves in various skits. They are known for repeatedly announcing their own names for no reason, as in "I'm Chaplin/Buster!". They are mentored by The Cinema Snob's own talking pet cat, Lloyd.

All of the cast members play fictionalized versions of their real counterparts as well as other characters during sketches. The series has also featured guest stars Dante Basco, Don Bluth, Kyle Hebert, JonTron, Maurice LaMarche, Rob Paulsen, James Rolfe, Tom Ruegger, Michael Salvatori, Greg Sestero, Sherri Stoner, Chris Stuckmann, Cree Summer, Rob Scallon, Corey Taylor and Mara Wilson as themselves, where they co-review, act in sketch segments, or make a cameo appearance.

== Episodes ==
As of November 18, 2026, Nostalgia Critic has a total of 826 episodes, currently in its nineteenth season.

Season	Episodes	Originally released	
Season	Episodes	First released	Last released
1	52	July 3, 2007	December 30, 2008
2	55	January 7, 2009	December 29, 2009
3	55	January 5, 2010	December 28, 2010
4	55	January 4, 2011	December 20, 2011
5	38	January 3, 2012	December 13, 2012
6	23	February 5, 2013	December 24, 2013
7	27	January 7, 2014	December 30, 2014
8	28	January 13, 2015	December 30, 2015
9	25	January 5, 2016	December 28, 2016
10	37	January 3, 2017	December 27, 2017
11	49	January 2, 2018	December 25, 2018
12	48	January 2, 2019	December 25, 2019
13	52	January 1, 2020	December 30, 2020
14	49	January 6, 2021	December 29, 2021
15	52	January 5, 2022	December 28, 2022
16	51	January 4, 2023	December 27, 2023
17	49	January 3, 2024	December 25, 2024
18	50	January 1, 2025	December 31, 2025
19	42	January 14, 2026	TBA

== Production ==
The series was initially launched on YouTube on July 3, 2007, with a review of Transformers, but episodes were frequently removed by the website following complaints of copyright infringement. In 2009, an arrangement between the company and Blip.tv, the content host of both the series and parent company Channel Awesome allowed the videos to return to YouTube, though Blip.tv remained the primary platform for their videos (alongside the Channel Awesome site) until its shutdown in 2015.

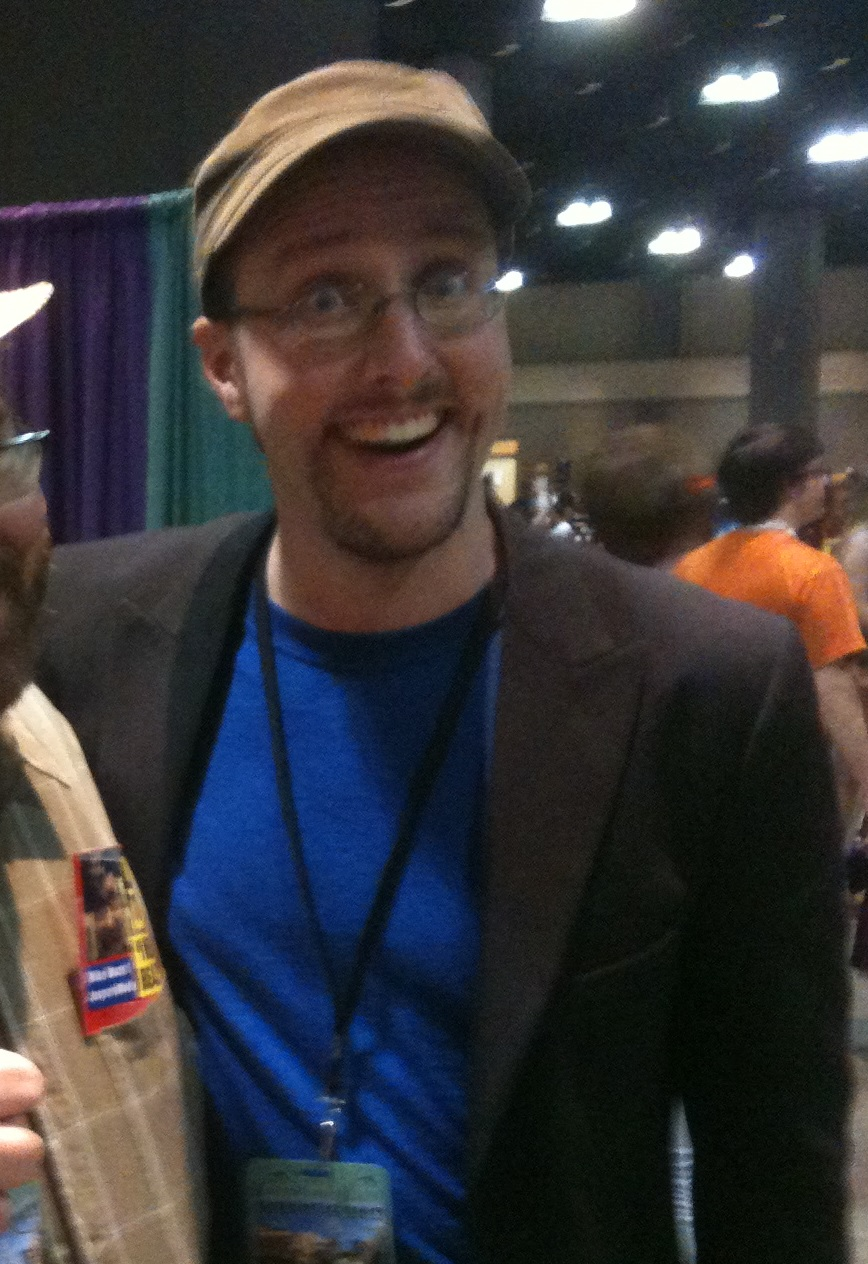
Nostalgia Critic creator and star Doug Walker at ConnectiCon in 2012

A spin-off, called The Nostalgia Chick, was announced in the video The Search for the Nostalgia Chick (August 10, 2008). The concept was for a female host to review female-targeted "nostalgic" films and television, and though it was presented as a contest, it was predetermined that all three candidates would end up on the site: Lindsay Ellis (who reviewed Disney's Pocahontas), Krissy Diggs (who reviewed Sailor Moon), and Kaylyn Saucedo (who reviewed The Last Unicorn). Ellis, then using the name "The Dudette", took the Nostalgia Chick title, as announced in a video on the site, Nostalgia Chick Winner! (September 15, 2008). Diggs and Saucedo then joined That Guy with the Glasses as That Chick with the Goggles and Marzgurl, respectively.

On September 14, 2012, Walker announced the retirement of Nostalgia Critic (although the Critic was planned to make appearances on special occasions). He and his brother, series co-creator and co-writer Rob Walker, felt that they had gone as far as they could with the series. They also felt that legislation such as the Stop Online Piracy Act (which ultimately was not passed) would pose a threat to Channel Awesome. The Critic was killed off at the end of the site's 2012 anniversary movie, To Boldly Flee, which was meant to serve as the grand finale of the Nostalgia Critic show.

The Walker brothers then focused their efforts on another web series, Demo Reel, which revolved around a struggling film production company run by an over-ambitious, egotistical, and incompetent filmmaker named Donnie DuPre (played by Doug Walker) and consisting of up-and-coming author and Pulitzer Prize-winning investigative journalist Tacoma Narrows (played by Malcolm Ray), failed actress Rebecca Stone (played by Rachel Teitz), East German cameraman and photographer Karl Copenhagen (played by Rob Walker), and Irish make-up artist "Quinn" (played by frequent collaborator Jim Jarosz). In the show, the studio aims to create purposefully bad recreations of famous movies, both old and new, to gain Hollywood's attention so they can make their own major motion picture. Ultimately, Demo Reel was unsuccessful; despite several seasons being planned, only one 6-episode series was created, only five episodes of which aired.

On January 22, 2013, Walker released a sketch short film titled The Review Must Go On, announcing the return of Nostalgia Critic and the end of Demo Reel. Ray, Teitz, and Jarosz would join the Walker brothers in the revival, although Teitz was later replaced by Tamara Chambers (who originally auditioned for Demo Reel) in season 8. Teitz would still make occasional appearances in later episodes. Chambers would later leave the show herself in 2024, to pursue other acting projects, with Channel Awesome cast member Heather Ruesz joining the cast of the Nostalgia Critic series soon after, having starred in previous Nostalgia Critic episodes since Season 9. Like Teitz, Chambers still made occasional guest appearances in the series since then.

== Reception ==
Greg Weisman, creator of Gargoyles, praised the Nostalgia Critic episode on his show on the grounds that "He liked us. We liked him. It was a whole mutual like-fest." Likewise, Roger Ebert praised the Nostalgia Critic tribute episode to Siskel and Ebert.

== See also ==
- Angry Video Game Nerd
- CinemaSins
- How It Should Have Ended
- Screen Junkies
