= Dr. Jekyll and Mr. Hyde (video game) =

1988 video game

- American box art
- Developer: Advance Communication Co.
- Publishers: JP: Toho; NA: Bandai
- Platform: Nintendo Entertainment System
- Release: JP: April 8, 1988; NA: July 1989
- Genre: Action
- Mode: Single-player

Dr. Jekyll and Mr. Hyde (Note: Known in Japan as Jekyll Hakase no Hōma ga Toki (ジーキル博士の彷魔が刻, Jīkiru Hakase no Hōma ga Toki; lit. Dr. Jekyll's Hour of the Wandering Monstrosity)) is a 1988 side-scrolling action video game for the Nintendo Entertainment System based on the 1886 novella Strange Case of Dr Jekyll and Mr Hyde by Robert Louis Stevenson. Gameplay alternates between the characters of Dr. Jekyll and Mr. Hyde based on the player's ability to either avoid or cause damage.

== Gameplay and premise ==
Gameplay in Dr. Jekyll mode, walking through town

In Dr. Jekyll and Mr. Hyde, Dr. Jekyll is on the way to his forthcoming wedding to Miss Millicent. The game's ending depends on which character, Jekyll or Hyde, reaches the church first.

As Dr. Jekyll walks to the church with his cane in hand, several townspeople, animals, and other obstacles obstruct his path, causing him to become angry. After his stress meter fills up, Dr. Jekyll will transform into Mr. Hyde. The gameplay then moves to a demonic world, where Hyde will fire out a "psycho wave" at various monsters. As Mr. Hyde kills these monsters, his anger abates and he eventually transforms back into Dr. Jekyll.

The game features six levels, but the levels differ between the Japanese and North American versions. The Japanese version follows this order: City, Park, Alley, Town, Cemetery, Street. However, the North American version replaces a few levels and follows this order: Town, Cemetery, Town, Park, Cemetery, Street. The North American version also removed certain sprites and segments from the original Japanese version.

The player starts out controlling Dr. Jekyll on his way to the church, walking to the right. Contrary to most platformers, Dr. Jekyll cannot attack the majority of his enemies (though he is equipped with a cane, which can kill bees) and, as a result, must avoid his enemies, rather than confront them directly. As he takes damage from the various enemies and obstacles, his Life Meter decreases and his Anger Meter increases. If his Life Meter is fully depleted, Dr. Jekyll dies and the game is over. If his Anger Meter completely fills, however, he transforms into Mr. Hyde. Day turns to night and monsters appear. At this point, the level is mirrored horizontally and Mr. Hyde walks from right to left with the screen autoscrolling. Mr. Hyde must kill monsters as fast as he can in order to turn back into Dr. Jekyll, with Shepp monsters generally giving the largest refill to his Meter, though killing other monsters may refill the Meter a small amount. Once the player returns as Dr. Jekyll, 70% of his Life Meter is restored.

If Hyde reaches a spot equivalent to where Dr. Jekyll reached in the latter's world (except in the final segment), a bolt of lightning strikes and kills him instantly. Therefore, the objective of the game is to advance as far as possible as Dr. Jekyll and to transform back as soon as possible as Mr. Hyde. However, the more detailed alternative ending of the game requires the player to strategically reach the Church with Mr. Hyde, but make sure Jekyll stays ahead of Mr. Hyde until the final level.

== Development and release ==
Dr. Jekyll and Mr. Hyde was developed by Advance Communication Company. The story of the game is based on Robert Louis Stevenson's novel Strange Case of Dr Jekyll and Mr Hyde. Dr. Jekyll and Mr. Hyde was published by Toho in Japan for the Family Computer on April 8, 1988.

Nintendo announced at a 1987 Consumer Electronic Show (CES) trade show that they had signed five licensing agreements to market titles exclusively for the Nintendo Entertainment System (NES), with one licensee being Bandai America. Dr. Jekyll and Mr. Hyde was announced as a future release by Bandai America at the Summer CES held in early June 1988. At the 1989 Winter CES in Las Vegas, Dr. Jekyll and Mr. Hyde was shown along with their two other games Athletic World and Bandai Golf: Challenge Pebble Beach. It was published by Bandai America for the Nintendo Entertainment System in July 1989. Dr. Jekyll and Mr. Hyde was described as being "largely ignored" in its own era and subsequently forgotten.

== Reception ==
Contemporary scores

Review scores
Publication	Score
Famitsu	3/10, 6/10, 6/10, 4/10
Famicom Hisshoubon	2.5/5

From contemporary reviews, the four reviewers in Famicom Tsūshin all described the game as either frustrating or too difficult. The second of two reviewers in Famicom Hisshoubon said that at first glance, the game resembled Castlevania III but that these thoughts quickly vanished when they found no elements of fun seemed to be considered when making the game. The first reviewer in Famicom Hisshoubon adored the idea of the game, saying that "the eternal theme of the duality of humanity has finally been put into a game" and that they look forward to the developer's next game. Two reviewers in Famicom Tsūshin said the duality gameplay concept with the Dr. Jekyll & Mr. Hyde-theme was an inspired choice, but not fully realized when applied to gameplay. One said it would have been superior as a more straight-forward action game while another said giving the game some patience could have them hooked. Two others from the magazine said it was too difficult to enjoy.

In the German magazine Aktueller Software Markt, Torsten Oppermann complimented the animation and said the background graphics were well realized, showcasing the English-styled scenery but said the scrolling effects and music in the game were presented poorly. Oppermann concluded it as one of the better NES games on the market at the time, saying that the system was already short on new software. Howard H. Wen of VideoGames & Computer Entertainment described that the game was a "love this one or hate it" affair, writing that some will appreciate the unconventional concept and unique gameplay while an equal amount may feel that a video game where the object is to walk a stressed-out man to church as being "ridiculously absurd". Wen found that the gameplay of blasting away at enemies as Hyde was the more fun part of the game, but as you were supposed to actively avoid becoming Hyde, it diminished the pleasure of it.

=== Retrospective reviews and legacy ===
Retrospective scores

Review scores
Publication	Score
AllGame	1.5/5
Game Informer	0.5/10

Retrospective reviews in AllGame and Game Informer described Dr. Jekyll and Mr. Hyde as a largely unplayable game.

Brett Alan Weiss of Allgame found the music and graphics in the game passable, but said the controls were "sluggish" and the action was exceedingly dull. Darrell Monti of Nintendo Life said it was "dull, repetitive, and bereft of imagination as a month's worth of daytime soaps." An anonymous reviewer in Game Informer described the game as "flawed on every fundamental level" and that it was potentially one of the most unplayable NES games. Writers for Eurogamer echoed similar statements, saying that the game "does everything so perfectly wrong" saying that events seem to happen at random and the game offered no explanation for its convoluted gameplay rules.

The game received more infamy decades later due to a presence of gamers on the internet through vlog retrospective reviews and vlog posts that struck a renewed interest in the game. Video game vlogger James Rolfe became one of the most popular internet personalities on YouTube when he created his persona of The Angry Video Game Nerd and selected the game as his second review. Rolfe's humorous review earned both himself and the game a cult following. Rolfe lamented that his initial video had the opposite effect intended as it had inadvertently piqued his audience's curiosity, leading them to play the game.

== See also ==
- List of Nintendo Entertainment System games
- List of video games notable for negative reception
