= Manos: The Hands of Fate (video game) =

2012 video game

- App icon for Manos: The Hands of Fate
- Developer: FreakZone
- Publisher: FreakZone
- Platforms: iOS; Android; Microsoft Windows
- Release: July 26, 2012
- Genre: Platform
- Mode: Single-player

Manos: The Hands of Fate is a platformer video game developed and published by FreakZone Games and based on the 1966 cult film of the same name. It was published in 2012 for iOS, with retro graphics and sound inspired by the 8-bit era for the Nintendo Entertainment System. It was later ported to Windows and Android. Manos: The Hands of Fate features Mike, a husband and father who attempts to expunge a man known as "The Master" in order to escape a lodge and rescue his family. Manos: The Hands of Fate has received mixed reviews from critics.

== Plot and gameplay ==
Mike makes his way through the first stage of Manos: The Hands of Fate.

Manos: The Hands of Fate is a side-scrolling platform game. Players control Mike, as he ventures through a haunted lodge in order to rescue his family from "The Master," the owner of said lodge. He is armed with a revolver, which can be upgraded to a more powerful shotgun. Mike is also able to locate hidden "Hands of Fate" which increase his vitality. At the end of each level, Mike encounters a boss, which must be defeated before he is able to advance to the next level.

== Development ==
The idea of creating a Manos-themed video game was a running joke between developer Sam Beddoes and his friend. Beddoes realized the film was in the public domain and that making such a game would be legally possible. The initial idea was to resemble Shadowgate for NES; however, after watching an episode of Angry Video Game Nerd, Beddoes realized "what Manos was destined to be". When asked by Eurogamer how they could turn the movie into a video game, the developers replied "[B]y latching onto memorable moments in the movie and blowing them wildly out of proportion!", noting that a kissing couple drinking beer in the film are represented in the game as an enemy that throws beer bottles at the player.

Manos: The Hands of Fate contains references to Mystery Science Theater 3000 episodes and films; however, they were made intentionally obscure to avoid copyright infringement. During the MST3K Kickstarter telethon, the Game Grumps played the game along with Crow T. Robot in MST3K's trademark "Shadowrama" style.

== Reception ==
Manos: The Hands of Fate has received mixed reviews from critics. Cody Musser, reviewing the iOS version for IGN, gave it a 6.0 out of 10. He praised the graphics and sound, but criticized the controls, bugs, and hit detection. A review of the Windows version for ScrewAttack gave it a 6.5 out of 10. They praised the gameplay, graphics, and sound, but said it is too easy and short.
