= Pat Contri =

American YouTuber and writer

- Born: May 9, 1980 (age 46)
- Occupations: YouTuber; writer

Patrick Contri (born May 9, 1980), better known as Pat the NES Punk, is an American YouTuber and writer.

== Biography ==
Contri was born May 9, 1980, in New Jersey. He began his career in 2008, producing videos related to Nintendo games. His content was often compared to the Angry Video Game Nerd, with whom he collaborated with on a number of occasions, including in 2011, when the pair reviewed the Nintendo World Championships.

In 2013, Contri appeared on Pawn Stars, trying to sell two NES '90 World Championship cartridges.

Since 2013, he has hosted The Completely Unnecessary Podcast (CUPodcast) alongside Ian Ferguson.

== Bibliography ==
- 2016: Ultimate Nintendo: Guide to the NES Library
- 2019: Ultimate Nintendo: Guide to the SNES Library
- 2024: Ultimate Nintendo: Guide to the N64 Library
