= Portland Retro Gaming Expo =

Videogaming & retrogaming event and non-profit organisation

- Status: Active
- Genre: Video gaming
- Venue: Oregon Convention Center
- Location: Portland, Oregon
- Country: United States
- Inaugurated: September 26, 2006
- Attendance: 30,000+ (2024)
- Filing status: 501 (c)4 non-profit
- Website: https://www.retrogamingexpo.com/

The Portland Retro Gaming Expo (PRGE) is an annual gaming convention and trade show celebrating gaming and video games as part of popular culture. This includes current video games, retro gaming, arcade games and pinball, board games, collectible card games and panels and Q&As with videogame industry pioneers and personalities.

== Origins ==
In the summer of 1997 a group of gamers from the Pacific Northwest called the NorthWest Classic Games Enthusiasts (NWCGE) gathered for their first meeting in the Seattle, WA area and decided to create an annual gathering. In 2001 this event grew to a weekend show and combined with an annual Atari Championship sponsored by a local arcade, which had been running since 1996. In 2006 NWCGE spawned a local event in the Portland, Oregon area which subsequently renamed itself to the Portland Retro Gaming Expo and found a permanent home in the Oregon Convention Center.

== Shows ==
Initially focused on retro gaming, the Portland Retro Gaming Expo quickly expanded to a wide range of gaming aspects. The show features a large free-play arcade with hundreds of coin-op and pinball machines, multiple console play areas, the official Blockbuster World Video Game Championship, the Classic Tetris World Championship, a themed museum, art shows, indie games, obsolete media formats, a collectibles live auction, many classic and modern tournaments and live DJs and bands. Multiple presentation tracks with industry alumni and content creators cover gaming-related topics and culture. An ongoing feature have been panel presentations by industry alumni such as Nolan Bushnell, David Crane (programmer), Garry Kitchen, Joseph C. Decuir, Howard Scott Warshaw, Jennell Jaquays, Rebecca Heineman, Ed Fries, Matt Uelmen and other former Atari, Activision, Imagic, Nintendo, Sega and Microsoft employees.

The retro gaming heritage is also represented by the Portland Retro Gaming Expo logo which recalls the iconic Atari CX40 joystick in front of stylized tree rings, highlighting Portland's lumber industry history.

== See also ==
- Culture of Portland, Oregon
- Video games in the United States
