= Big Rigs: Over the Road Racing =

2003 video game

- Developer: Stellar Stone
- Publisher: GameMill Publishing
- Producer: Sergey Titov
- Designer: Artem Mironovsky
- Programmers: Denis Julitov; Sergey Titov
- Artists: Yaroslav Kulov; Svetlana Slavinskaya; Peter Jameson; Tim Maletsky
- Composer: Alex Burton
- Platform: Windows
- Release: NA: November 20, 2003
- Genre: Racing
- Mode: Single-player

Big Rigs: Over the Road Racing is a 2003 racing video game developed by Stellar Stone and published by GameMill Publishing. The player controls a semi-trailer truck (a "big rig") and races a stationary opponent through checkpoints on US truck routes. Stellar Stone, based in California, outsourced the game's development to Ukraine, and the game was released in an unfinished state on November 20, 2003. Due to a multitude of bugs and a lack of proper gameplay, Big Rigs was critically panned, became the worst-rated game on review aggregator websites Metacritic and GameRankings, and has frequently been cited as one of the worst video games of all time by gaming publications. Margarite Entertainment re-released the game via Steam in April 2025.

== Gameplay ==
A big rig climbing a steep mountain

Big Rigs: Over the Road Racing is a racing video game. Although the game's packaging states the objective as racing over U.S. truck routes to be the first to deliver cargo and avoid the police, the game features no law enforcement. The player chooses from four playable semi-trailer trucks (i.e. "big rigs") and five truck routes, although selecting the fourth route will cause the game to crash. Once selected, the player navigates their truck through checkpoints using the arrow keys. Driving in reverse allows the truck to accelerate indefinitely, while releasing the associated key instantly halts it.

There is no time limit to complete a race, and the opponent does not move. (Note: With a "1.0" patch dated November 2003, the opponent starts driving along the road but stops before the finish line.) The player's truck can pass through the opponent and all objects placed on the route due to a lack of collision detection. Off-roading bears no traction penalty, hills can be ascended and descended without affecting the truck's speed, and traversal is possible in the void outside the game map. Completing a race rewards the player with an image of a trophy bearing the phrase "YOU'RE WINNER !" [sic]. (Note: The text was changed to "You win!" in a later release.)

== Development and release ==
The development of Big Rigs: Over the Road Racing was commissioned by Stellar Stone, a company based in Santa Monica, California, founded in late 2000 that outsourced game development to Eastern European countries such as Russia. Sergey Titov, the chief executive officer of TS Group Entertainment, licensed his Eternity game engine to Stellar Stone in exchange for a "large chunk of the company". According to him, Big Rigs was developed by a team in Ukraine. Although Titov is credited as the producer and co-programmer of the game, he claimed to have had neither much input into the development nor the possibility of halting the game's release. He stated that publisher GameMill Publishing initially sought to release one racing game stock keeping unit but later decided to split it into two—Big Rigs and Midnight Race Club: Supercharged!—and shipped Big Rigs in what Titov believed was a pre-alpha state. The game was released on November 20, 2003, for Windows and distributed exclusively through Wal-Mart stores. Titov later offered to replace the game with any Activision Value title for buyers who sent him their game copy, sales receipt, and registration card, which twenty people did.

== Reception ==
Reception

Aggregate score
Aggregator	Score
Metacritic	6/100

Review score
Publication	Score
GameSpot	1/10

Big Rigs: Over the Road Racing received "overwhelming dislike", according to the review aggregator website Metacritic. Around the initial release, based on five critic reviews, the site calculated a weighted average rating of 8/100, its lowest ever. A sixth review dropped the score to 6/100 in 2025. The game also stood as the all-time worst game on GameRankings. Big Rigs has been cited as one of the worst video games of all time by GameSpot (2004), PC Gamer (2010 and 2019), Kotaku (2012 and 2015), Computer and Video Games (2013), Hardcore Gamer (2014), The Guardian (2015), and GamesRadar+ (2017). On X-Play's March 2004 "Games You Should Never Buy" segment, co-host Morgan Webb described Big Rigs as "the worst game ever made" and refused to score it, as the program's rating system did not allow for a zero score. Steve Haske of GameZone regarded it as the "most abysmal" racing game in 2011.

Alex Navarro reviewed Big Rigs for GameSpot in January 2004 and criticized the game's high number of bugs (including the absence of collision detection, enemy movement, and game physics), lack of proper gameplay, and poor truck controls. Additionally, he labeled the game as "easily one of the worst-looking PC games released in years" and "almost completely broken and blatantly unfinished in nearly every way", declaring that Big Rigs was "as bad as your mind will allow you to comprehend". Navarro rated the game a 1/10 (described as "abysmal"), the lowest score GameSpot allowed and had awarded up to that point. He later argued that GameSpot should have introduced a 0/10 rating for Big Rigs. The game remained the only one to have received a 1/10 rating from GameSpot until 2013's Ride to Hell: Retribution. In the site's 2004 year-end accolades, Big Rigs was named the "Flat-Out Worst Game", and the editors stated that they would henceforth use the game's winning trophy to represent the award.

In 2014, Alex Carlson of Hardcore Gamer remarked that, because Big Rigs lacked a challenge, incentive to play, and ability to lose, it could not be accurately described as a game. According to Steven Strom of Ars Technica, "Big Rigs isn't just a failure of programming (thanks to numerous bugs and crashes). It's a failure of creativity." Hardcore Gaming 101's Paul Chenevert was torn between calling Big Rigs "hilariously campy or just shamefully terrible".

== Legacy ==
Jason Schreier, writing for Kotaku in 2012, opined that the humorous video accompanying Navarro's Big Rigs review "immortalized" the game. A satirical review on Angry Video Game Nerd significantly contributed to the game's popularity. Big Rigs has attracted a cult following, with yourewinner.com forming a dedicated fansite. David Houghton of GamesRadar attributed the game's notoriety to its bugs, saying that, otherwise, "Big Rigs would simply be an unremarkable, long-forgotten racing also-ran, rather than the festival of hilarity it currently stands as". Titov went on to work for Riot Games on League of Legends before releasing The War Z in December 2012. In September 2008, he stated that he was still in possession of the source code for Big Rigs and Eternity, but could not release the former because the game was still owned by Stellar Stone and GameMill.

The NYU Game Center exhibited Big Rigs as part of its Bad Is Beautiful: An Exhibition Exploring Fascinatingly Bad Games at the NYU Game Center in April 2012. In January 2015, Navarro performed a speedrun of the game for the Awesome Games Done Quick charity event. The English test of the 2022 Polish Matura featured an excerpt from a Big Rigs review.

Margarite Entertainment announced a re-release for Steam in March 2025, claiming to have acquired the game alongside several other older titles. The company is associated with the Hong Kong investment company ACG+ Capital, and Big Rigs was its only announced game. The re-release was published on April 8, 2025, with the 1.0 patch that makes the opponent move. Achievements were added through the external "Winner Wizard" application.
