= Angry Joe =

American YouTuber (born 1984)

Joe Vargas
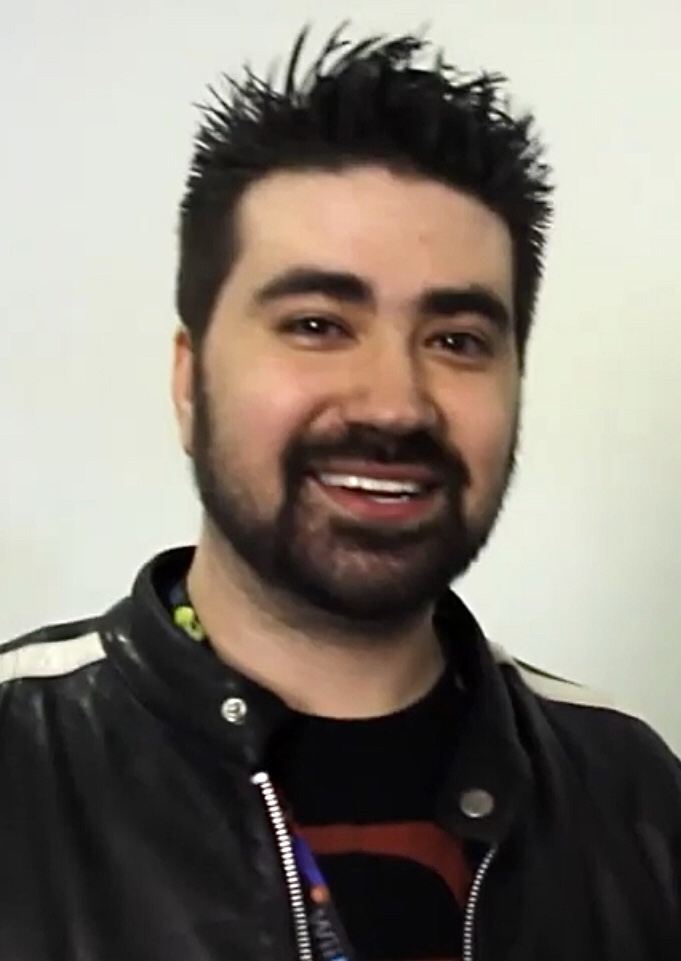
- Vargas at E3 2015
- Born: Jose Antonio Vargas; June 18, 1984 (age 42); Austin, Texas, U.S.
- Occupation: YouTuber

YouTube information
- Channel: AngryJoeShow
- Years active: 2008–present
- Genres: Let's Play; comedy; film/video game reviews; reactions; vlog
- Subscribers: 3.21 million
- Views: 1.75 billion
- Last updated: February 9, 2026
- Website: angryjoeshow.com/ajsa

Jose Antonio Vargas (born June 18, 1984) is an American media commentator and YouTuber. He is notable for his portrayal of Angry Joe, the titular host of his media review-oriented YouTube channel AngryJoeShow.

== YouTube ==
Vargas launched his YouTube channel AngryJoeShow on October 4, 2008, with the video "Shit that Pisses Me Off - Madden 2009 Hardcore Gamers". The show features Vargas' character "AngryJoe" reviewing a video game with a scale from 1–10. These reviews typically use sketch comedy and clips from his streams on Twitch. The channel was well received by the YouTube community; as of April 2021, it has accrued over one billion views and amassed more than 3.2 million subscribers. In addition to game reviews, Vargas produces movie reviews on his channel. He and his channel have received mention in media covering YouTube, most notably for Vargas' opposition to copyright overreach on YouTube. His interest in copyright on YouTube stemmed from an incident in which Nintendo of America filed a copyright claim on a video of Joe playing Mario Party 10.

Vargas was affiliated with Blistered Thumbs of the media production company Channel Awesome until April 2018. His departure was due to the then-ongoing controversy regarding Channel Awesome and many of its former producers, many of whom Vargas had previously known and affiliated with in the past.

In April 2018, a Kickstarter project to create a board game featuring miniature-sized figures of licensed characters from the Street Fighter series of video games (in collaboration with Jasco Games) was launched by Vargas. The project's Kickstarter campaign raised $400,000 on its first day, an event which in turn attracted media coverage. In January 2021, Street Fighter: The Miniatures Game began shipping to those that backed the Kickstarter project. Vargas worked in another collaboration with Jasco Games on Mortal Kombat: The Miniatures Game based on the license of the same name.

== Awards and nominations ==
Year	Association	Category	Nominated work	Result	Ref.
2016	The Game Awards	Trending Gamer	AngryJoeShow	Nominated	
