= List of Angry Video Game Nerd episodes =

Angry Video Game Nerd (abbreviated as AVGN) is an American web series of comedy-themed retrogaming reviews, created by and starring James Rolfe. The show revolves around reviews that involve acerbic rants about low quality video games. From the beginning of season 2, new episodes were aired first on GameTrailers.com, but are since now aired at Cinemassacre.com, with episodes later being re-aired on Rolfe's own YouTube channel. Episodes are usually scheduled for release on the first or second Wednesday of each month; originally, Rolfe's early work schedule allowed for two episodes per month, but other work commitments changed this to its present arrangement.

The only Angry Video Game Nerd episode, although still available for viewing, that never officially made it to/remained on YouTube in its original form was Atari Porn, which was removed after the site flagged it for inappropriate content per its community guidelines. On November 21, 2023, a heavily censored version was officially uploaded to the Cinemassacre YouTube channel, under the name Atari Pork. The two-part review of Teenage Mutant Ninja Turtles III was removed for copyright issues, but an edited version was reuploaded in 2020 as one video. Two other episodes were later removed for using movie clips from copyrighted films – Rocky and Super Mario Bros. 3 – but were later reuploaded to YouTube after being amended and changed to comply with the website's policies.

== Series overview ==
Season	Episodes	Originally released	
Season	Episodes	First released	Last released
0	2	May 25, 2004	June 15, 2004
1	15	April 8, 2006	December 23, 2006
2	24	January 25, 2007	January 22, 2008
3	23	February 19, 2008	January 27, 2009
4	25	March 16, 2009	March 6, 2010
5	11	April 30, 2010	March 3, 2011
6	6	April 6, 2011	December 7, 2011
7	11	July 24, 2012	December 19, 2013
8	16	March 19, 2014	December 22, 2014
Film		July 21, 2014	
9	5	March 26, 2015	December 22, 2015
10	5	April 6, 2016	December 20, 2016
11	12	March 23, 2017	December 22, 2017
12	9	April 25, 2018	December 15, 2018
13	11	January 23, 2019	December 11, 2019
14	12	January 15, 2020	December 15, 2020
15	13	March 15, 2021	December 21, 2021
16	6	March 17, 2022	December 22, 2022
17	6	February 24, 2023	December 22, 2023
18	9	February 25, 2024	December 20, 2024
19	8	February 24, 2025	December 18, 2025
20	8	February 6, 2026	TBA

== Episodes ==
=== Pilots (2004) ===
No. overall	No. in season	Title	Time	Original release date
1	1	"Castlevania 2: Simon's Quest"	9:26	May 25, 2004 (Original); April 8, 2006 (YouTube)
The Nerd makes his first ever game review, and tries to tackle Castlevania II: Simon's Quest for the NES, revealing the many flaws and issues that came with it. Notes: This episode was originally filmed and edited in May 2004, and previously only available as a part of a film compilation tape with other short films James Rolfe had previously wrote, produced, edited and directed himself.
2	2	"Dr. Jekyll and Mr. Hyde"	6:29	June 15, 2004 (Original); April 8, 2006 (YouTube)
The Nerd takes on reviewing the extremely difficult Dr. Jekyll and Mr. Hyde for the NES, in which even the first level is almost impossible to complete. Notes: This episode was originally filmed and edited on June 15, 2004, and previously only available as a part of a film compilation tape with other short films Rolfe wrote, produced, edited and directed. This is the first time James Rolfe appeared on screen as the Nerd.

=== Season 1 (2006) ===
No. overall	No. in season	Title	Time	Original release date
3	1	"The Karate Kid"	4:29	April 8, 2006
The Nerd tries out his best moves, as he sees if The Karate Kid for the NES is as good as the movie it is based on. Notes: This episode was intended to be the last to be made by Rolfe, before the online series took off.
4	2	"Who Framed Roger Rabbit"	3:46	April 24, 2006
The Nerd wonders if someone framed him to tackle a bad video game, as he takes on the NES game based on Who Framed Roger Rabbit.
5	3	"Teenage Mutant Ninja Turtles"	7:05	June 29, 2006
The Nerd prepares to go all "cowabunga" and ninja, as he reviews the game Teenage Mutant Ninja Turtles for the NES.
6	4	"Back to the Future"	6:43	July 21, 2006
The Nerd certainly travels back in time, as he takes a look at two bad NES games based on the Back to the Future series. Note: The DVD version of this episode edited out clips from the first Back to the Future film.
7	5	"McKids"	7:07	August 30, 2006
There is nothing he can love about bad video games, as the Nerd reviews M.C. Kids for the NES – a video game based on a popular fast food chain McDonald's. Note: This is the first episode to feature the Nerd's theme song, written, composed and performed by Kyle Justin.
8	6	"Wally Bear and the NO! Gang"	3:46	September 1, 2006
The Nerd finds out what is bad about Wally Bear and the NO! Gang for the NES, a game aimed at teaching kids to not take drugs. Note: The DVD version of this episode and its re-release feature an additional scene in which the Nerd calls the Wally Bear hotline.
9	7	"Master Chu and the Drunkard Hu"	4:20	September 8, 2006
The Nerd takes a look at the poor quality behind the game Master Chu and the Drunkard Hu for the NES. First appearance of "guest reviewer" Shit Pickle, a cartoon pickle with feces as hair.
10	8	"Top Gun"	7:35	September 15, 2006
The Nerd tackles two more bad NES games based on another film – Top Gun – and finds out how some elements of their gameplay are just impossible to do. Note: The DVD version of this episode and its re-release remove the Kenny Loggins song "Danger Zone".
11	9	"Double Dragon 3"	4:10	September 22, 2006
The Nerd finds out what was bad in the third entry in the Double Dragon video game series – Double Dragon III: The Sacred Stones for the NES. When he sees "Bimmy and Jimmy", The Nerd correctly acknowledges that "Bimmy" is a typo, and makes fun of the name.
12	10	"Friday the 13th"	12:22	October 13, 2006
The Nerd prepares for Halloween by taking a look at why the NES game based on Friday the 13th is more frustrating than scary. Throughout the whole episode Jason Voorhees keeps threatening him to continue playing and hates it when AVGN says bad things about the game, causing him to say how great it is sarcastically. He later loses it and kills Jason with the NES Zapper gun. Guest Star: Mike Matei as Jason Voorhees
13	11	"A Nightmare on Elm Street"	13:27	October 31, 2006
It is Halloween, and the Nerd isn't really that scared when he reviews the NES game based on the movie A Nightmare on Elm Street. AVGN clones himself to try the four player option the game has, his clones die to Freddy Krueger, he later kills Freddy with the Power Glove. Guest Star: Mike Matei as Freddy Krueger (voice provided by James Rolfe) Notes: While the DVD edition contained new music in place of that from Nightmare on Elm Street, an edited edition for ScrewAttack featured both an alternate opening and ending to the episode, along with the song "Welcome to My Nightmare" by Alice Cooper over the end credits. The review itself is featured on the second disc of Never Sleep Again: The Elm Street Legacy.
14	12	"The Power Glove"	12:28	November 15, 2006
The Nerd finds out how good (or bad) Nintendo's Power Glove is, by using it to play a variety of games on the NES. Note: Up until this episode, the show was known as "The Angry Nintendo Nerd", before Rolfe changed the name to allow him to focus on games on other systems.
15	13	"Chronologically Confused About Bad Movie and Video Game Sequel Titles"	11:34	November 28, 2006
The Nerd discusses the naming of sequels for various movie and video game franchises he has seen or played.
16	14	"Rocky"	9:46	December 14, 2006 (GameTrailers); December 20, 2006 (YouTube)
The Nerd pumps himself up for a fight, to prepare himself for reviewing the Sega Master System video game based on Rocky. Notes: Both the Season 1 DVD and the YouTube re-release feature an alternative ending to the review, involving the Nerd throwing the game off the stairs at the Philadelphia Museum of Art. Some elements of the review were edited out for the DVD version. This episode was made to commemorate the then-upcoming release of Rocky Balboa.
17	15	"Bible Games"	21:29	December 25, 2006
It is Christmas, so the Nerd sees how bad a number of unlicensed religious-themed games were on both the NES and SNES, including Super 3D Noah's Ark – a game built on the same game engine as Wolfenstein 3D. Note: This review was divided into two parts for the ScrewAttack website.

=== Season 2 (2007–08) ===
No. overall	No. in season	Title	Time	Original release date
18	1	"Teenage Mutant Ninja Turtles III – Part 1"	11:14	January 25, 2007
Part 1 of 2. The Nerd tackles his first movie review and sits down to watch the third entry in the Teenage Mutant Ninja Turtles film trilogy – Teenage Mutant Ninja Turtles III. Notes: Due to violating the terms of use, the review was removed from YouTube; it was made available on both the Cinemassacre and ScrewAttack websites as a direct result, with the former combining both parts into one episode. Much of the episode was not included on the AVGN Volume 2 DVD due to copyright reasons. A re-edited version of this episode (with movie clips edited out) was re-released on YouTube on September 11, 2020.
19	2	"Teenage Mutant Ninja Turtles III – Part 2"	10:47	January 25, 2007
Part 2 of 2. The Nerd concludes his review of Teenage Mutant Ninja Turtles III.
20	3	"Atari 5200"	10:39	February 13, 2007 (GameTrailers); July 25, 2008 (YouTube)
The Nerd attempts to play the Atari 5200. However, after struggling to set up the console, he is unable to play any games as both the standard Atari 5200 joystick and Trak-Ball controllers don't work. Note: This episode was the first to be featured on GameTrailers, and the first to include the standard intro sequence used on the web series. Starting with this episode, the Nerd's theme song was re-recorded with the new ending lyric.
21	4	"Ghostbusters"	17:29	February 27, 2007 (GameTrailers); August 6, 2008 (YouTube)
Part 1 of 3. If there's something bad, and you don't like it, then you need the Nerd. He's soon tackling something worse than ghosts, when he reviews Ghostbusters for the NES. Guest Star: Kyle Justin (voice-only) Note: Both the YouTube higher quality upload and DVD versions feature a mimic version of the Ghostbusters theme, while, due to copyright issues, clips from the movie were replaced with still images for both versions.
22	5	"Ghostbusters: Follow-Up"	11:27	March 20, 2007 (GameTrailers); August 26, 2008 (YouTube)
Part 2 of 3. The Nerd is once more being called out to bust down more bad games based on Ghostbusters, as he looks at those made for the NES, Atari 2600 and Sega Master System. Note: Due to copyright issues, both the YouTube re-release and DVD versions saw the clips from Ghostbusters being replaced with artwork by Mike Matei.
23	6	"Ghostbusters: Conclusion"	13:11	April 3, 2007 (GameTrailers); September 8, 2008 (YouTube)
Part 3 of 3. It is a third outing for the Nerd against more bad games based on Ghostbusters, as he reviews two more made for the NES and Genesis. Note: Both the DVD and YouTube re-release version feature different soundtracks to the original, while copyright issues meant that clips from the Ghostbusters movie were replaced by still images from its poster.
24	7	"Spider-Man"	10:32	April 17, 2007 (GameTrailers); September 22, 2008 (YouTube)
The Nerd has his hands full, swatting down bad video games based upon comic book character Spider-Man, created for the Atari 2600, NES, Game Boy and Game Boy Advance. Guest Star: Kyle Justin as Spider-Man Note: This episode was made to commemorate the then-upcoming release of Spider-Man 3.
25	8	"Sega CD"	13:12	May 2, 2007 (GameTrailers); November 18, 2008 (YouTube)
The Nerd reveals how some console add-ons were never worth owning, as he takes a look at the Sega CD – an add-on for the Sega Genesis – and finds out what the games made for it are like. Note: This episode features the full-length theme song, also written, composed and performed by Justin.
26	9	"Sega 32X"	9:04	May 15, 2007 (GameTrailers) December 6, 2008 (YouTube)
The Nerd finds out what another add-on for the Sega Genesis is like – the 32X – and tries out some of the games that were made for it, including Primal Rage and Doom.
27	10	"Silver Surfer"	11:17	June 5, 2007 (GameTrailers); December 8, 2008 (YouTube)
Another superhero has had a bad game made about them, so the Nerd delves in to find out just what it is like to play Silver Surfer for the NES. Note: This episode was made to commemorate the then-upcoming release of Fantastic Four: Rise of the Silver Surfer.
28	11	"Die Hard"	9:03	June 13, 2007 (GameTrailers); January 21, 2009 (YouTube)
Action is certainly lacking, as the Nerd reviews another bad game that won't easily die – Die Hard for the NES. Note: This episode was made to commemorate the then-upcoming release of Live Free or Die Hard.
29	12	"Independence Day"	6:09	July 3, 2007 (GameTrailers); July 4, 2009 (YouTube)
To protect the independence of good games from bad ones, the Nerd takes on the PlayStation game based upon Independence Day, and is soon wishing aliens could destroy this one.
30	13	"The Simpsons"	13:17	July 17, 2007 (GameTrailers); February 3, 2009 (YouTube)
The Nerd will be saying more than "D'oh!" as he takes a look at two terrible NES games based on the hit cartoon series The Simpsons: Bart vs. the Space Mutants and Bart vs. the World . Note: This episode was made to commemorate the then-upcoming release of The Simpsons Movie.
31	14	"Bugs Bunny's Birthday Blowout"	8:43	August 7, 2007 (GameTrailers); February 16, 2009 (YouTube)
There's nothing looney about the Nerd's next review of a bad video game, as he attempts to find fun within Bugs Bunny Birthday Blowout for the NES. Guest Star: Mike Matei as Bugs Bunny
32	15	"Atari Porn"	10:03	August 22, 2007 (GameTrailers); November 21, 2023 (YouTube, heavily censored)
The Nerd finds himself reviewing a collection of rather badly-made, controversial, adult-rated games that were created for Atari systems, including Custer's Revenge, Beat 'Em & Eat 'Em, and Bachelor Party. Notes: Due to its suggestive nature, this episode in its original form was not made available on YouTube on the Cinemassacre channel, premiering only on the Cinemassacre website. Despite this, unofficial re-uploads are still accessible on the site. On November 21, 2023, a heavily censored version of the episode was released on the Cinemassacre YouTube channel, under the name Atari Pork.
33	16	"Nintendo Power"	14:42	September 4, 2007 (GameTrailers); June 4, 2009 (YouTube)
Taking a break from bad video games, the Nerd spends his time recalling his fondest memories of reading the Nintendo Power magazine. Guest Star: Kyle Justin
34	17	"Fester's Quest"	9:25	September 18, 2007 (GameTrailers); July 1, 2009 (YouTube)
Creepy and spooky don't seem to cut it, as the Nerd reviews two bad games based on The Addams Family, made for the NES and Genesis. Guest Star: Kyle Justin as Cousin Itt
35	18	"Texas Chainsaw Massacre"	12:46	October 9, 2007 (GameTrailers); October 8, 2008 (YouTube)
The Nerd faces the horror of a bad video game for his Halloween that he wishes he could cut apart with a chainsaw, as he reviews the Atari 2600 game based on The Texas Chain Saw Massacre. Guest Stars: Mike Matei as Leatherface and Chop Top and Steven J. Klaszky (credited as Jimmie Jim Slugg) as the hillbilly
36	19	"Halloween"	16:05	October 30, 2007 (GameTrailers); October 30, 2008 (YouTube)
Halloween is upon him, so for his nightmarish night the Nerd must review three very bad Halloween-themed video games for the Atari 2600. Guest Stars: Michael Mulvey and Lil' Liam Mulvey as "the kids", Mike Matei and Liam Mulvey as Michael Myers, and Nicole Mulvey as "the neighbor"
37	20	"Dragon's Lair"	9:22	November 20, 2007 (GameTrailers); July 15, 2009 (YouTube)
The Nerd struggles to be a true hero, as he looks to tackling a console version of a classic game: Dragon's Lair for the NES.
38	21	"An Angry Nerd Christmas Carol: Part 1"	5:54	December 18, 2007 (GameTrailers); December 17, 2008 (YouTube)
Part 1 of 2. The Nerd spends his Christmas by focusing his attention on Home Alone 2: Lost in New York for the NES. Guest Stars: Co-founder of ScrewAttack.com, "Stuttering Craig" Skistimas, as the Ghost of Christmas Past
39	22	"An Angry Nerd Christmas Carol: Part 2"	9:42	December 23, 2007 (GameTrailers); December 19, 2008 (YouTube)
Part 2 of 2. The Nerd continues to spend his Christmas by taking a look at Shaq Fu for the SNES, and three bad games for the Wii: Far Cry Vengeance, Super Monkey Ball: Banana Blitz, and Boogie. Guest Stars: Co-founder of ScrewAttack.com, "Stuttering Craig" Skistimas, as the Ghost of Christmas Past and "Handsome Tom" Hanley as the Ghost of Christmas Present
40	23	"Chronologically Confused About the Legend of Zelda Timeline"	19:01	January 8, 2008 (GameTrailers); July 19, 2009 (YouTube)
The Nerd tries to make sense of the chronology behind the timeline for one of Nintendo's well-known video game series – The Legend of Zelda. Note: According to James Rolfe, who introduces the episodes, this episode was a previously unreleased episode originally written in November 2006.
41	24	"Rambo"	13:14	January 22, 2008 (GameTrailers); August 7, 2009 (YouTube)
The Nerd finds himself in action hell, as he looks at three bad games for the NES and Sega Master System, based on the Rambo film series. Note: This episode was made to commemorate the then-upcoming release of Rambo.

=== Season 3 (2008–09) ===
No. overall	No. in season	Title	Time	Original release date
42	1	"Virtual Boy"	15:34	February 19, 2008 (GameTrailers); August 24, 2009 (YouTube)
The Nerd reviews Nintendo's ill-fated Virtual Boy console along with the limited number of games that were made for the console. The Nerd says that while most of the games were ok, they also could have been made on just about any other console at the time, such as Game Boy. While the Nerd says that Wario Land and Teleroboxer were the system's best games, the red and black color scheme was prone to give gamers headaches and eye strain. The Nerd himself said that his eyes were "starting to hurt already" while he reviewed Galactic Pinball (only the second game in the episode). Notes: This episode originally did not include a review of Jack Bros., which was the only North American Virtual Boy release that James Rolfe did not own at the time. He later acquired a copy of the Japanese release of Jack Bros., with his review first featured on the DVD release this episode was on. Rolfe later uploaded the updated episode to YouTube. The original release of the episode featured a clip from the 1995 film Waterworld since Rolfe reviewed the Virtual Boy version of its tie-in game; it was removed from the update.
43	2	"The Wizard of Oz"	11:25	March 4, 2008 (GameTrailers); September 11, 2009 (YouTube)
The Nerd is wishing he was not playing another bad game, as he reviews The Wizard of Oz for the SNES. Guest Star: Mike Matei as the Cowardly Lion
44	3	"Double Vision: Part 1"	10:04	March 25, 2008 (GameTrailers); September 17, 2009 (YouTube)
Part 1 of 2. The Nerd tackles reviewing two second-generation consoles from the late 1970s to the early 1980s. In part one, he looks at the Intellivision and the games made for it, including Utopia, Masters of the Universe: The Power of He-Man and Advanced Dungeons & Dragons. He also takes a look at B-17 Bomber and Bomb Squad; two games compatible with the Intellivoice Voice Synthesis Module. Guest Star: Kyle Justin Note: Both parts were merged into one episode for the DVD version.
45	4	"Double Vision: Part 2"	8:24	April 8, 2008 (GameTrailers); September 25, 2009 (YouTube)
Part 2 of 2. The Nerd reviews the ColecoVision and plays the games that were made for this console, including Montezuma's Revenge, Cabbage Patch Kids: Adventures in the Park, Chuck Norris Superkicks, and War Room. Guest Star: Kyle Justin Note: Both parts were merged into one episode for the DVD version.
46	5	"Super Mario Bros 3 and The Wizard"	17:19	April 22, 2008 (GameTrailers); November 8, 2009 (YouTube)
The Nerd takes a look at a good game for once, as he recalls how great it was to play Super Mario Bros. 3 on the NES, while also taking a look back to a film in which it was featured in – The Wizard. Notes: For copyright reasons, re-releases of this episode do not feature the review of the movie, although it is still mentioned in the game review. The episode's opening segment consisted of a medley of fan-made theme song renditions.
47	6	"NES Accessories"	13:51	May 14, 2008 (GameTrailers); November 24, 2009 (YouTube)
The Nerd reviews several accessories for the NES in an attempt to find out how well they still hold up, including the NES Zapper and Power Pad, the Konami LaserScope, the U-Force, and the LJN Roll & Rocker. He also spends some time using the Super Scope peripheral for the SNES.
48	7	"Indiana Jones Trilogy"	18:43	May 20, 2008 (GameTrailers); December 12, 2009 (YouTube)
Donning a leather hat and whip, the Nerd delves into the holy grail of bad video games, as he looks at a collection of games based on the Indiana Jones film series, made for the Atari 2600, NES and SNES. Notes: The DVD version adds reviews of the Taito Last Crusade game for the NES. Rolfe later uploaded the updated episode to YouTube. This episode was made to commemorate the then-upcoming release of Indiana Jones and the Kingdom of the Crystal Skull.
49	8	"Star Trek"	10:45	June 11, 2008 (GameTrailers); May 7, 2009 (YouTube)
The Nerd boldly goes where no bad game should ever go, by beaming down a collection of games based on the science fiction media franchise Star Trek, made for the Vectrex, Atari 2600, ColecoVision and NES. Guest Star: Mike Matei as a Klingon and a Metron Note: James Rolfe included a brief review of the Vectrex for this episode.
50	9	"Superman"	11:46	June 26, 2008 (GameTrailers); January 1, 2010 (YouTube)
Bad games will never be faster than a speeding Super Nerd, as he reviews two bad video games based upon Superman, made for the Atari 2600 and NES.
51	10	"Superman 64"	10:37	July 8, 2008 (GameTrailers); January 13, 2010 (YouTube)
Super Nerd returns, this time to save the day from two more bad video games: Superman: The Game for the Commodore 64, and the much-requested Superman 64 for the Nintendo 64. Notes: James Rolfe included a brief review of the Commodore 64 for this episode. It was also technically the last episode to have filming done in Rolfe's gaming room in New Jersey, before production focused on its new site in Pennsylvania.
52	11	"Batman Part I"	11:45	July 22, 2008 (GameTrailers); January 27, 2010 (YouTube)
Part 1 of 2. The Nerd dons his cowl and cape and prepares to beat back the darkness of bad Batman video games, including Batman: The Caped Crusader (Commodore 64), Batman (NES), Batman Returns (Sega CD and Atari Lynx), The Adventures of Batman & Robin (SNES), and Batman Forever (SNES). After the Nerd calls it quits, the Joker ties him up and forces him to play more Batman games. Guest Star: Mike Matei as the Joker Notes: The opening sequence for these episodes was specially themed around a parody of the 60s Batman TV series opening, and was animated by Matei. These episodes were made to commemorate the release of The Dark Knight.
53	12	"Batman Part II"	9:42	August 10, 2008 (GameTrailers); January 29, 2010 (YouTube)
Part 2 of 2. Under the Joker's capture, the Nerd is forced to review Batman: Return of the Joker (NES and Game Boy) and Batman: Revenge of the Joker (Sega Genesis). In a rage, the Nerd eventually gains the upper hand and battles the Joker in an homage to the 1960s Batman series. Guest Star: Mike Matei as the Joker
54	13	"Deadly Towers"	8:20	August 19, 2008 (GameTrailers); February 28, 2010 (YouTube)
The Nerd finds out how deadly difficult it is to complete another bad video game, when he attempts to review Deadly Towers for the NES. Notes: This episode was written from an adaptation of fan-submitted screenplay, as Rolfe asked fans to submit their experiences with the game and suggest dialogue he would use for the review. Those whose input was chosen for the review were credited at the end of the episode.
55	14	"Battletoads"	7:52	September 3, 2008 (GameTrailers); March 17, 2010 (YouTube)
As the Nerd prepares to review Battletoads for the NES, he finds himself joined by his theme song performer, The Guitar Guy—who's been living behind his couch—who assists him in explaining why the game is impossible to complete with two players. Guest Star: Kyle Justin
56	15	"Dick Tracy"	14:04	September 16, 2008 (GameTrailers); March 28, 2010 (YouTube)
The Nerd turns into a detective to find out "what [they were] thinking" as he investigates Dick Tracy for the NES, and soon uncovers its many flaws and extreme difficulty. Note: The YouTube version was edited with an additional minute of content. The Nerd's anger displayed in this video is widely deemed as his furthest, as he was never successful at the game due to its excessive difficulty.
57	16	"Dracula"	11:57	October 14, 2008 (GameTrailers); October 2, 2009 (YouTube)
Halloween is approaching, but the Nerd finds it hard to see Count Dracula being scary to him, as he looks at a selection of "horror-ble" games based on the vampire legend that are much scarier. These include Bram Stoker's Dracula, and Sesame Street: Countdown for the NES, SNES, Genesis, and the Sega CD. This episode is the first mention of Fred Fucks, the Nerd's arch-nemesis, based on the illegibility of the name of Bram Stoker's Dracula executive producer, Fred Fuchs, in the video game credits. Notes: James Rolfe included a short review of the VIC-20 for this episode. A scene that was featured in one of the reviews was edited out in the DVD version for copyright issues.
58	17	"Frankenstein"	14:08	October 29, 2008 (GameTrailers); October 13, 2009 (YouTube)
Halloween has arrived, and the Nerd is green with anger at finding out that there are bad video games on the NES and SNES that have been based on another horror legend – Frankenstein. Guest Star: Mike Matei as Franken-Nerd
59	18	"CD-i Part I"	7:57	November 12, 2008 (GameTrailers); April 14, 2010 (YouTube)
Part 1 of 3. The Nerd begins his three-part review of the Philips CD-i by giving a brief overview of the console itself, and playing Hotel Mario.
60	19	"CD-i Part II"	12:35	November 25, 2008 (GameTrailers); April 20, 2010 (YouTube)
Part 2 of 3. The Nerd reviews Zelda: The Wand of Gamelon for the CD-i.
61	20	"CD-i Part III"	14:15	December 9, 2008 (GameTrailers); April 28, 2010 (YouTube)
Part 3 of 3. The Nerd finishes off his review of the CD-i by reviewing a remarkably similar Link: The Faces of Evil, and concluding with Zelda's Adventure.
62	21	"Bible Games II"	17:00	December 23, 2008 (GameTrailers); December 19, 2009 (YouTube)
It is Christmas, and for this year the Nerd finds himself reviewing another collection of badly-made, religious-themed video games for the NES, CD-i and Game Boy, including Exodus: Journey to the Promised Land, Noah's Ark, and King James Bible. Note: This was the first AVGN episode to be filmed in 720p HD and produced to be shown in widescreen.
63	22	"Michael Jackson's Moonwalker"	10:04	January 7, 2009 (GameTrailers); July 14, 2010 (YouTube)
The Nerd tries to moonwalk his way around another bad game, as takes a look at Michael Jackson's Moonwalker for the Genesis. Note: This was the first episode where the Nerd doesn't say the F-word.
64	23	"Milon's Secret Castle"	11:33	January 27, 2009 (GameTrailers); September 14, 2010 (YouTube)
The Nerd finds no secrets to make a bad game look good, when he reviews Milon's Secret Castle for the NES.

=== Season 4 (2009–10) ===
No. overall	No. in season	Title	Time	Original release date
65	1	"Atari Jaguar Part I"	8:23	March 16, 2009 (GameTrailers); August 14, 2010 (YouTube)
Part 1 of 2. The Nerd spends some time taking a look at the Atari Jaguar and takes a brief look at the games Zool 2, Brutal Sports Football, Checkered Flag, and Cybermorph and compares them with similar looking 16-bit titles. He also takes a look back at the history of Atari, and the competition between different consoles for superior processing capabilities.
66	2	"Atari Jaguar Part II"	14:21	March 25, 2009 (GameTrailers) August 25, 2010 (YouTube)
Part 2 of 2. The Nerd concludes his review of the Atari Jaguar by playing some games including Tempest 2000, Alien vs Predator, Doom, Attack of the Mutant Penguins, Kasumi Ninja, and an in-depth review of Cybermorph (which he briefly talked about in part 1). The Nerd says that Tempest 2000, Alien vs Predator and Doom are the best games on the console, while Kasumi Ninja and Cybermorph are among the worst with Mutant Penguins being a very confusing game. The Nerd also attempts to play the Jaguar CD add-on. Unfortunately, he is unable to get the Jaguar CD to work properly.
67	3	"Metal Gear"	13:17	April 8, 2009 (GameTrailers); November 10, 2010 (YouTube)
The Nerd brings out his codec and stealth gear as he tries to navigate his way around Metal Gear for the NES, while also discussing the game's sequels in Chronologically Confused About Metal Gear Sequels.
68	4	"Odyssey"	10:58	April 21, 2009 (GameTrailers); November 26, 2010 (YouTube)
The Nerd finds out what the Magnavox Odyssey console is like, by trying it out along with some of its "games".
69	5	"X-Men"	14:11	May 6, 2009 (GameTrailers); November 27, 2010 (YouTube)
There's a mutation of bad video games to review, as the Nerd looks at those based on the X-Men, made for the NES, Genesis and video arcade machines. Note: This episode was made to commemorate the release of X-Men Origins: Wolverine.
70	6	"The Terminator"	14:54	May 19, 2009 (GameTrailers); January 7, 2011 (YouTube)
The Nerd attempts to terminate some bad games as he reviews a selection of NES, SNES, and Sega CD games, based on The Terminator. Notes: Because of the game being reviewed, the opening intro sequence was themed around the opening credits for The Terminator. These episodes were made to commemorate the release of Terminator Salvation.
71	7	"Terminator 2"	13:25	June 2, 2009 (GameTrailers); January 11, 2011 (YouTube)
The bad games are back, as the Nerd looks at a selection of NES, SNES, Genesis, and Game Boy games, based upon Terminator 2: Judgment Day. Note: Like the previous episode, the intro sequence was themed around the opening credits for Terminator 2: Judgment Day.
72	8	"Transformers"	12:43	June 17, 2009 (GameTrailers); January 18, 2011 (YouTube)
Video games are transforming into truly bad ones for the Nerd, as he looks at two for the Commodore 64 and the Famicom, based upon Transformers. Notes: James Rolfe included a short review of the Famicom and the Family Computer Disk System for this episode. This episode was made to commemorate the then-upcoming release of Transformers: Revenge of the Fallen.
73	9	"Mario Is Missing!"	9:30	July 1, 2009 (GameTrailers); February 15, 2011 (YouTube)
Mario is a great icon in gaming, but the Nerd takes a look at NES and SNES versions of two games he stars in that were not so great – Mario Is Missing! and Mario's Time Machine.
74	10	"Plumbers Don't Wear Ties"	20:38	July 21, 2009 (GameTrailers); March 8, 2011 (YouTube)
Another console comes under the Nerd's gaze, as he takes a moment to briefly cover the commercial failure of the 3DO Interactive Multiplayer, and reviews a poorly made decision-based slideshow game for the system, Plumbers Don't Wear Ties.
75	11	"Bugs Bunny's Crazy Castle"	16:58	August 5, 2009 (GameTrailers); March 15, 2011 (YouTube)
The Nerd finds himself in another cartoon battle with a familiar face from the past, as he tries to avoid reviewing the bad games from the Crazy Castle series, made for the NES, Game Boy, Game Boy Color, and Game Boy Advance. Guest Stars: Mike Matei as Bugs Bunny/Woody Woodpecker and Kyle Justin as Guitar Guy
76	12	"Super Pitfall!"	11:07	August 20, 2009 (GameTrailers); March 22, 2011 (YouTube)
A bad game filled with flaws and issues leaves the Nerd wanting to be out of its pit, as he tries out Super Pitfall for the NES.
77	13	"Godzilla"	15:46	September 4, 2009 (GameTrailers); April 14, 2011 (YouTube)
Japan's legendary giant monster can't avoid starring in a number of bad video games, as the Nerd takes a look at Godzilla: Monster of Monsters!, Godzilla 2: War of the Monsters, Godzilla for the Game Boy, Super Godzilla and a good game Godzilla: Kaijū Daikessen– and briefly glances at a trio of other good games for the Xbox and the PlayStation 2. Notes: James Rolfe included a brief review on the Godzilla films for this episode.
78	14	"Wayne's World"	12:15	September 24, 2009 (GameTrailers); May 3, 2011 (YouTube)
The Nerd remembers Wayne's World was popular in the 1990s, then reviews the licensed video game based on the movie for the NES and SNES that was meant to cheaply cash in. Note: Due to copyright issues, clips from the Wayne's World films and a clip from Borat were edited out of the DVD version.
79	15	"Castlevania Part I"	10:08	October 8, 2009 (GameTrailers); October 3, 2010 (YouTube)
Part 1 of 4. In a four-part special, the Nerd spends his Halloween reminiscing on the Castlevania series, beginning with the Nerd reviewing the original Castlevania for the NES.
80	16	"Castlevania Part II"	12:47	October 21, 2009 (GameTrailers); October 12, 2010 (YouTube)
Part 2 of 4. The Nerd re-visits Castlevania II: Simon's Quest and reviews Castlevania III: Dracula's Curse for the NES.
81	17	"Castlevania Part III"	12:52	November 5, 2009 (GameTrailers); October 20, 2010 (YouTube)
Part 3 of 4. The Nerd reviews Super Castlevania IV and Castlevania: Dracula X for the SNES, and also Castlevania 64 for the Nintendo 64.
82	18	"Castlevania Part IV"	9:48	November 19, 2009 (GameTrailers); October 27, 2010 (YouTube)
Part 4 of 4. The Nerd concludes his four-part Castlevania reviews by playing Castlevania: Bloodlines for the Sega Genesis and Castlevania: Symphony of the Night for the PlayStation.
83	19	"Little Red Hood"	14:54	December 3, 2009 (GameTrailers); May 3, 2011 (YouTube)
The woods today are filled with bad games, but the big bad Nerd has to venture into them if he's to complete his review of Little Red Hood — an unlicensed Taiwanese game for the NES.
84	20	"Winter Games"	10:28	December 23, 2009 (GameTrailers); December 20, 2010 (YouTube)
It is Christmas, and the Nerd spends it this year by seeing what kind of virtual sportsman he can be in Winter Games for the NES.
85	21	"Street Fighter 2010"	17:56	January 6, 2010 (GameTrailers); June 10, 2011 (YouTube)
The Nerd prepares to fight against more bad games, as he takes a look at a selection of bad Street Fighter games for the NES, TurboGrafx-CD, and Sega Saturn, including one based on Street Fighter: The Movie. Note: James Rolfe included a short review of the TurboGrafx-16 for this episode. In addition, the episode's opening sequence featured a montage of the title cards created by Mike Matei used in the past series of episodes between 2006 and 2009.
86	22	"Hydlide"	8:28	January 20, 2010 (GameTrailers); June 14, 2011 (YouTube)
The Nerd ponders on whether it is worth it to review an RPG that has similarities to The Legend of Zelda – Hydlide for the NES.
87	23	"Ninja Gaiden"	15:40	February 4, 2010 (GameTrailers); June 14, 2011 (YouTube)
To hone his ninja skills against bad games, the Nerd takes on reviewing Ninja Gaiden for the NES. Guest Stars: Kevin Finn as "a ninja" Notes: Following this episode, James Rolfe switched from using the NES Top Loader, to the Nintoaster – a specially designed NES made out of a household toaster, that was given to Rolfe by its creator, Richard Daluz.
88	24	"Swordquest"	9:12	February 18, 2010 (GameTrailers); July 2, 2011 (YouTube)
The Nerd details the history of the short-lived Atari 2600 video game series Swordquest, and one of the most elaborate contests created around a video game – a contest which offered US$150,000 (approximately US$429,000 in 2026) of real treasures as prizes. Notes: This was second episode where the Nerd doesn't say the F-word.
89	25	"Pong Consoles"	12:00	March 6, 2010 (GameTrailers); July 18, 2011 (YouTube)
The Nerd gives a brief overview of various video game consoles that were designed to play the table-tennis video game Pong in the 1970s–1980s, many of which are nonfunctional.

=== Season 5 (2010–11) ===
No. overall	No. in season	Title	Time	Original release date
90	1	"Action 52"	26:50	April 30, 2010 (GameTrailers); July 21, 2011 (YouTube)
Part 1 of 2. The Nerd prepares himself to tackle not one, but a vast variety of poorly-designed, dysfunctional video games that were compiled into one cartridge – Action 52 for the NES. Note: Due to copyright issues, a scene in the review was edited out for the DVD version.
91	2	"Cheetahmen"	20:25	June 9, 2010 (GameTrailers); August 11, 2011 (YouTube)
Part 2 of 2. The Nerd concludes his review of Action 52 by taking a look at one game in particular in its selection – Cheetahmen. He also takes a look at the unreleased Cheetahmen II game for the NES, along with the Genesis version of Action 52 with its own version of Cheetahmen.
92	3	"Game Glitches"	16:07	July 8, 2010 (GameTrailers); September 2, 2011 (YouTube)
The Nerd reviews various glitches and bugs that can be found in games both past and present, including Pac-Man, Metal Gear, Punch-Out!!, Mega Man 5, Super Mario Bros., Super Mario World, The Legend of Zelda: Twilight Princess and Rocky. Guest Star: Kevin Finn as the Game Graphic Glitch Gremlin Note: The opening sequence for this episode was deliberately glitched, to keep it in line with the episode's theme.
93	4	"Zelda II"	15:07	August 4, 2010 (GameTrailers); November 15, 2011 (YouTube)
The Nerd prepares to travel to Hyrule, as he takes on the quest of reviewing the sequel to The Legend of Zelda – Zelda II: The Adventure of Link for the NES. Note: James Rolfe included a short review of The Legend of Zelda for this episode.
94	5	"Back to the Future Re-Revisited"	23:04	September 3, 2010 (GameTrailers); December 1, 2011 (YouTube)
The Nerd takes a trip down memory lane, as he revisits some of his previous reviews he made on games such as Top Gun, Who Framed Roger Rabbit, Teenage Mutant Ninja Turtles, and Back to the Future.
95	6	"Dr. Jekyll and Mr. Hyde Revisited"	16:40	October 7, 2010 (GameTrailers); October 31, 2011 (YouTube)
For Halloween this year, the Nerd decides to give a more elaborate and in-depth review of Dr. Jekyll and Mr. Hyde for the NES. Shortly after, he is attacked by the bones and remains of Robert Louis Stevenson. Note: The title card made for this episode is based upon a poster for the 1931 film version of Dr. Jekyll and Mr. Hyde.
96	7	"Lester the Unlikely"	10:44	November 4, 2010 (GameTrailers); December 26, 2011 (YouTube)
The Nerd finds it unlikely that his next bad game will surprise him, as he reviews Lester the Unlikely for the SNES – a video game with an uncharismatic protagonist and unfair difficulty.
97	8	"How the Nerd Stole Christmas"	12:07	December 6, 2010
In a parody of How the Grinch Stole Christmas!, the Nerd briefly glances at a number of bad NES games while speaking entirely in rhyme. He most extensively looks at Town & Country Surf Designs: Wood & Water Rage, Circus Caper, and Fist of the Northstar. Note: Non-gameplay segments of this episode are entirely hand-drawn illustrations by Mike Matei. In addition, composer Bear McCreary arranged a special parody of "You're a Mean One, Mr. Grinch", incorporating NES-styled audio elements.
98	9	"Day Dreamin' Davey"	14:00	January 5, 2011 (GameTrailers); December 30, 2011 (YouTube)
The Nerd daydreams of playing a better game as he reviews Day Dreamin' Davey for the NES — a game with suggestive cutscenes and dull gameplay.
99	10	"Star Wars Games"	22:28	February 3, 2011 (GameTrailers); February 9, 2012 (YouTube)
The force is strong with the Nerd, as he helps to fight back against the dark powers of bad games based on the Star Wars film series. These include Star Wars on Famicom, Star Wars and Star Wars: The Empire Strikes Back on NES. Note: This was the final episode to be presented in the 4:3 aspect ratio.
100	11	"R.O.B. the Robot"	18:52	March 3, 2011 (GameTrailers); March 15, 2012 (YouTube)
To mark the 100th episode of The Angry Video Game Nerd, the Nerd takes on reviewing two bad NES games – Gyromite and Stack-Up – while dealing with the unwelcome help of Nintendo's R.O.B. Notes: The intro for this episode features clips from previous episodes along with a montage of all the title cards drawn for it by Mike Matei. Until the 139th episode, this was the last one to feature a title card by Matei, due to personal opinions on their usage. The music for this episode was composed by John Jennings Boyd and Lachlan Barclay. Starting with this episode, the series permanently changes to the widescreen aspect ratio.

=== Season 6 (2011) ===
No. overall	No. in season	Title	Time	Original release date
101	1	"Spielberg Games"	21:18	April 6, 2011 (GameTrailers); April 12, 2012 (YouTube)
The Nerd finds himself facing a deluge of bad games for the NES, Genesis, SNES, Sega CD, 3DO, and Atari 2600, all based on movies connected to Steven Spielberg, including Jaws, Hook, and Jurassic Park. Note: A teaser for Angry Video Game Nerd: The Movie was shown at the end of the episode, intended to advertise the movie before unforeseen difficulties in filming pushed back its release date.
102	2	"The Making of an Angry Video Game Nerd Episode"	35:05	July 7, 2011 (GameTrailers); May 1, 2012 (YouTube)
James Rolfe gives fans of the Angry Video Game Nerd a behind-the-scenes look at how an episode of the web series is made, by showing what is done when reviewing a game. In this case, a review by the Nerd of Barbie for NES.
103	3	"Kid Kool"	8:14	August 3, 2011 (GameTrailers); May 7, 2012 (YouTube)
The Nerd finds nothing cool about his latest review of a bad video game – Kid Kool for the NES – as he showcases the many flaws in its gameplay.
104	4	"Nintendo World Championships"	17:02	August 26, 2011 (GameTrailers); May 16, 2012 (YouTube)
The Nerd attempts to get his hand on a good copy of Nintendo World Championships for the NES – a series of Nintendo games on one cartridge, used as part of a contest in the 1990s – but soon questions whether it is worth it in the end. Guest Stars: Pat Contri as "Pat the NES Punk" Notes: Contri helped co-write this episode. This was the last episode to be filmed in 480p.
105	5	"Dark Castle"	12:07	October 6, 2011 (GameTrailers); October 1, 2012 (YouTube)
It is Halloween again, and the Nerd spends it by reviewing both the Genesis and CD-i versions of Dark Castle. He soon shows off how horribly difficult the game is, even on its easiest setting.
106	6	"Bible Games III"	14:14	December 7, 2011 (GameTrailers); December 11, 2012 (YouTube)
Christmas has arrived, and the Nerd finds himself once again reviewing a selection of badly-made, religious-themed video games for the Game Boy, Genesis, and NES, including Spiritual Warfare and Bible Adventures. Note: This is the first episode to be filmed in 1080p HD and the final episode to be released on GameTrailers.

=== Season 7 (2012–13) ===
Starting with this season, episodes no longer aired on GameTrailers.

No. overall	No. in season	Title	Time	Original release date
107	1	"Schwarzenegger Games"	22:26	July 24, 2012
The Nerd is back, as he tackles a selection of NES games based upon movies that starred Arnold Schwarzenegger, including Total Recall, Last Action Hero, and Predator.
108	2	"Ghosts n' Goblins"	17:04	October 24, 2012
The Nerd attempts to show his fans how to play and beat the video game he got as a kid – Ghosts 'n Goblins for the NES.
109	3	"Atari Sports"	12:42	December 18, 2012
The Nerd takes a look at a variety of sport-themed games made for the Atari 2600, including football games, baseball games, boxing games, soccer games, and golf games.
110	4	"Ikari Warriors"	20:39	March 6, 2013
The Nerd revives his old friend, the "guitar guy", to help him review Ikari Warriors for the NES, and find out what it is like to play it with two players. Guest Stars: Kyle Justin
111	5	"Toxic Crusaders"	14:42	April 30, 2013
The Nerd shows why bad video games shouldn't be based on TV shows and movies, as he reviews the Game Boy, Genesis, and NES versions of Toxic Crusaders. Guest Stars: Lloyd Kaufman, co-founder of Troma Entertainment
112	6	"Bill & Ted's Excellent Adventure"	17:52	June 30, 2013
Nothing excellent is likely to be found when going back in time, as the Nerd reviews the NES game based upon Bill & Ted's Excellent Video Game Adventure.
113	7	"Tiger Electronic Games"	18:39	September 6, 2013
The Nerd casts his eye on a selection of hardware by Tiger Electronics, including a selection of LCD handheld games and wristwatch-styled games, plus two portable consoles – the Game.com and the R-Zone.
114	8	"Alien 3"	10:17	October 21, 2013 (Cinemassacre); October 22, 2013 (YouTube)
It is another Halloween, and the Nerd tries to find something scary that could pop out of his NES game cartridge, when he takes a look at Alien 3.
115	9	"AVGN Games!"	21:55	November 20, 2013
The Nerd takes a break from bad games to look at a collection of titles based around his life, featuring those for the PC and iOS, as well as two special ones made for the Atari 2600 and NES. The Nerd finishes off with a review of the then-newly-released Angry Video Game Nerd Adventures for Steam.
116	10	"Wish List: Part 1 – Sonic the Hedgehog & more!"	15:07	December 17, 2013
Part 1 of 2. The Nerd takes a look back at department store wishlist catalogs before tackling a wishlist of games that fans wish for him to review including Bad Dudes, Skate or Die!, Karate Champ, Where's Waldo?, Sonic Blast, Sonic Labyrinth, Sonic R, Sonic Shuffle, and Shadow the Hedgehog.
117	11	"Wish List: Part 2 – Bubsy 3D & more!"	15:27	December 19, 2013
Part 2 of 2. The Nerd reviews more games off of the fan's wishlist including A Boy and His Blob, The Three Stooges, Home Improvement, Pit-Fighter, Bubsy 3D, and Spider-Man and Venom: Maximum Carnage.

=== Season 8 (2014) ===
Episodes 5 to 16 were released as part of the "12 Days of Shitsmas" event in December 2014.

No. overall	No. in season	Title	Time	Original release date
118	1	"Big Rigs: Over the Road Racing"	15:44	March 19, 2014
Travelling back to the 2000s this time around, the Nerd takes on Big Rigs: Over the Road Racing for PC – a poorly-made video game considered by reviewers as one of the worst to have been made, due to the many design flaws, bugs and glitches that were in it.
119	2	"Desert Bus"	15:30	May 28, 2014
In celebration of the 10th Anniversary of AVGN, The Nerd takes a quick look at various games within Penn & Teller's Smoke and Mirrors for the Sega CD – a video game cancelled before it was released and designed as a joke on various game genres – before focusing on one game in its collection that's as bad as Big Rigs – Desert Bus. He then takes a look at a hacked redaction of the NES game Castlevania II: Simon's Quest, which focused on fixing a number of flaws and issues he complained about in his review of the original game. Note: This episode served as a precursor for the AVGN movie, which was later released that year.
120	3	"E.T. Atari 2600"	7:00	October 10, 2014
Taken from Angry Video Game Nerd: The Movie, this episode focuses on the Nerd's review of one of Atari's worst video games they ever made – E.T. the Extra-Terrestrial for the Atari 2600. Notes: Although basically a clip from the movie, this episode differs from it in that it featured actual footage from the game. In the movie, the game was represented by specially-made animation of the game, due to a lack of licensing rights to the original version.
121	4	"Beetlejuice"	13:53	October 14, 2014
It is another Halloween, and the Nerd considers why anyone would want to play the NES game based on Beetlejuice.
122	5	"Tagin' Dragon"	3:50	December 11, 2014
12 Days of Shitsmas Part 1. The Nerd begins his first day of his Christmas by unwrapping and reviewing Tagin' Dragon – a bad game for the NES with truly difficult gameplay.
123	6	"ALF"	4:06	December 12, 2014
12 Days of Shitsmas Part 2. For the second day of his Christmas, the Nerd finds nothing funny with his next present, as he reviews a video game based on the American sitcom of the same name – ALF for the Sega Master System.
124	7	"CrazyBus"	4:06	December 13, 2014
12 Days of Shitsmas Part 3. For the third day of his Christmas, the Nerd finds himself reviewing CrazyBus – an unlicensed Venezuelan game/app that was made for the Sega Genesis, and features little in the way of good gameplay.
125	8	"Ren & Stimpy: Fire Dogs"	5:16	December 14, 2014
12 Days of Shitsmas Part 4. For the fourth day of his Christmas, the Nerd finds he has a copy of The Ren & Stimpy Show: Fire Dogs for the SNES amongst his presents – a video game with bad gameplay, that does no justice to Ren & Stimpy.
126	9	"Rocky and Bullwinkle"	4:06	December 15, 2014
12 Days of Shitsmas Part 5. For the fifth day of his Christmas, the Nerd plays another bad NES game amongst his presents, based upon The Adventures of Rocky and Bullwinkle and Friends cartoon series.
127	10	"Mary-Kate and Ashley "Get a Clue""	4:15	December 16, 2014
12 Days of Shitsmas Part 6. For the sixth day of his Christmas, the Nerd attempts to find what clues there are in Mary-Kate and Ashley "Get a Clue" for the Game Boy Color, that show it is a truly bad game to play.
128	11	"V.I.P. with Pamela Anderson"	4:53	December 17, 2014
12 Days of Shitsmas Part 7. For the seventh day of his Christmas, the Nerd is lulled into a false sense of hope for a good game, as he reviews V.I.P. for the PlayStation – a bad video game based on the TV series, featuring Pamela Anderson amongst its characters.
129	12	"Lethal Weapon"	4:37	December 18, 2014
12 Days of Shitsmas Part 8. For the eighth day of his Christmas, the Nerd finds his weapons against bad games are going dull, as he reviews a NES game based upon Lethal Weapon. Guest Stars: Mike Matei as himself
130	13	"Porky's"	6:02	December 19, 2014
12 Days of Shitsmas Part 9. For the ninth day of his Christmas, the Nerd smells a bad game amongst his presents, as he tackles with the confusing gameplay of Porky's for the Atari 2600.
131	14	"HyperScan"	6:32	December 20, 2014
12 Days of Shitsmas Part 10. For the tenth day of his Christmas, the Nerd has a go with playing the HyperScan – a console designed to use special cards that need to be scanned into it to play its selection of games.
132	15	"Universal Studios Theme Parks Adventure"	11:29	December 21, 2014
12 Days of Shitsmas Part 11. For the eleventh day of his Christmas, the Nerd questions why he needs to walk around a virtual version of a real theme park, as he tries out Universal Studios Theme Parks Adventure for the GameCube, considered the worst videogame of the whole GameCube catalogue.
133	16	"LJN Video Art"	8:43	December 22, 2014
12 Days of Shitsmas Part 12. For the twelfth and final day of his Christmas, the Nerd wonders what use there is to make art with LJN Video Art, and recalls some of the better art games made in the past including Mario Paint.

=== Angry Video Game Nerd: The Movie (2014) ===
At the end of the Spielberg Games review, it was implied that E.T. would be reviewed in The Angry Video Game Nerd: The Movie. Eventually, at TooManyGames 2011 and Magfest 2012, Rolfe confirmed that he would review E.T. in the film. E.T. programmer, Howard Scott Warshaw, also makes an appearance in the film. The film premiered July 21, 2014.

=== Season 9 (2015) ===
No. overall	No. in season	Title	Time	Original release date
134	1	"Hong Kong 97"	12:46	March 26, 2015
The Nerd takes a look at a horrible game that never left Japan, and featured so many things that were wrong with it – Hong Kong 97 for the Super Famicom.
135	2	"Darkwing Duck"	13:49	May 13, 2015
Finding a bad video game to review is hard, so the Nerd turns his attention towards the TurboGrafx-16, and a game based on the Darkwing Duck cartoon series.
136	3	"Seaman"	17:24	July 28, 2015 (Cinemassacre); July 29, 2015 (YouTube)
Growing your own sea life sounds cool, but the Nerd shows how a virtual way of doing it can never be truly good, when he has a go at Seaman for the Dreamcast. Note: This episode was dedicated to Leonard Nimoy, the narrator for the English-language version of Seaman, who died in February of that year. The Nerd also makes numerous references to Star Trek to honor this.
137	4	"The Crow"	9:43	October 30, 2015
Another Halloween arrives, and the Nerd spends it tackling another bad game that has truly poor gameplay – The Crow: City of Angels for the Sega Saturn.
138	5	"Mortal Kombat Mythologies: Sub-Zero"	12:02	December 22, 2015
Christmas has arrived, and the Nerd has received a copy of a bad game to look forward to – Mortal Kombat Mythologies: Sub-Zero for the Nintendo 64.

=== Season 10 (2016) ===
No. overall	No. in season	Title	Time	Original release date
139	1	"Mega Man Games"	25:06	April 6, 2016
To celebrate the 10th anniversary of the Cinemassacre YouTube channel, the Nerd updates his gaming room and tackles a collection of bad games in HD. More precisely, a collection of bad Mega Man games for the PC, PlayStation and PlayStation 2. This includes the DOS versions of Mega Man and Mega Man III, Mega Man Legends for the PlayStation, and Mega Man X7 for the PlayStation 2. Guest Star: Mike Matei as Bugs Bunny
140	2	"Paperboy"	16:05	May 26, 2016
Extra, extra – the Nerd tackles reviewing Paperboy for the NES, while answering the question of whether a rolled up newspaper can truly break a window, and if you can throw one into a mailbox while riding along on a bicycle.
141	3	"Beavis and Butt-Head"	14:18	August 16, 2016
It is time for the Nerd to snicker and make dumb comments, as he takes a look at two bad games made for the SNES and Genesis, based on the Beavis and Butt-Head adult cartoon series.
142	4	"Berenstain Bears"	19:41	October 18, 2016
It is Halloween again, and the Nerd tackles three bad games for the Game Boy Color, Atari 2600 and Genesis, based on the children's series of books and cartoons about the Berenstain Bears and then winds up pondering the situation where he seems to remember the franchise's name as something different.
143	5	"Sega Activator Interactor Menacer"	11:51	December 20, 2016
For Christmas, the Nerd takes a look at a series of Genesis accessories for its games, including the Activator, Aura Interactor, Menacer, Victormaxx Stuntmaster, TeeV Golf, and Batter Up! Baseball bat. Guest Stars: Nathan Barnatt as Keith Apicary Note: This episode featured a total budget of $3,614, according to the episode's commentary, making it the most expensive to be made in the series to date. Amongst the costs were Barnatt's travel fees, the use of breakaway props, and the accessories that had to be acquired on eBay.

=== Season 11 (2017) ===
No. overall	No. in season	Title	Time	Original release date
144	1	"Mighty Morphin Power Rangers"	20:15	March 23, 2017
The Nerd goes "Mighty Morphin" bad, as he takes on a collection of games for the Famicom, NES, SNES, Genesis, Sega CD, Nintendo 64, and Game Boy, based around Mighty Morphin Power Rangers. Note: This episode's intro is designed as a parody of the Mighty Morphin Power Rangers theme song, while the episode was made to celebrate the then-upcoming release of the film Power Rangers.
145	2	"Sonic the Hedgehog 2006"	16:47	April 20, 2017
For the first time in his series, the Nerd tackles a game from a later generation of consoles that does nothing to the reputation of a certain blue hedgehog – Sonic the Hedgehog (2006) for the Xbox 360.
146	3	"Planet of the Apes"	12:34	July 4, 2017
While clearing up his game room and getting stranded on another planet, the Nerd questions why a bad game has trashed a particularly good classic movie, when he reviews Planet of the Apes for the PlayStation. Note: This episode was made to commemorate the then-upcoming release of War for the Planet of the Apes.
147	4	"Game Boy Accessories"	16:15	August 15, 2017
Another selection of accessories receives a good thorough look from the Nerd. This time, it is a collection of accessories for the Game Boy, including good ones – like the Game Boy Camera and the Game Boy Printer – bad ones, and even a patented one that was aimed for use in hospitals.
148	5	"Treasure Master"	10:03	September 20, 2017
Treasure is truly lacking within another bad game designed to be used in a contest, as the Nerd finds out what it is like to play Treasure Master for the NES.
149	6	"Wrestling Games"	11:55	October 4, 2017
The Nerd wrestles with a ton of bad NES and SNES games based on wrestling, including WWF WrestleMania Challenge, WWF Royal Rumble, WCW SuperBrawl Wrestling, and Saturday Night Slam Masters.
150	7	"Polybius"	22:18	October 25, 2017
The Nerd takes a look at the arcade classic Polybius, while he also delves into the urban legend surrounding the mentioned side effects of playing the game. Notes: This episode was originally released as a series of mini segments on the "Cinemassacre Plays" channel, October 19–24, and in the form of a daily found footage diary. The full release of this episode included an extended ending scene.
151	8	"RoboCop NES Games"	13:52	November 19, 2017
Following his time with Polybius, the Nerd is reborn as "RoboNerd", whose prime directives are to play bad games, and keep gamers safe from them. These include a selection of NES games based on the original RoboCop film series.
152	9	"Sonic 2006 Part 2"	13:34	November 30, 2017
The Nerd has some unfinished business, as he continues on with his review of Sonic the Hedgehog (2006) for the Xbox 360.
153	10	"Charlie's Angels"	9:41	December 6, 2017
The Nerd won't be making a call to Charlie's Angels anytime soon, as he plays a bad GameCube game based on them.
154	11	"Star Wars: Masters of Teräs Käsi"	8:47	December 13, 2017
Another bad Star Wars game has emerged, so the Nerd must channel the force to help him review Star Wars: Masters of Teräs Käsi for the PlayStation. Notes: This episode features brief footage of Star Wars Episode I: Racer for the Nintendo 64, but James Rolfe did not include a review of it for this episode. The episode was made to celebrate the then-upcoming release of Star Wars: The Last Jedi.
155	12	"Lightspan Adventures"	15:37	December 22, 2017
The Nerd has rotted his brain with such an insane number of bad games, that this Christmas he gets himself a PlayStation with a compilation of video games from the Lightspan Adventures series to help restore it.

=== Season 12 (2018) ===
No. overall	No. in season	Title	Time	Original release date
156	1	"EarthBound"	39:35	April 17, 2018 (Amazon); April 25, 2018 (YouTube)
When the Nerd finds a copy of Nintendo Power exuding a belief that EarthBound was a rotten game, he later finds reviews that show how glamorous the game was and reveals a fanbase for a title he now has to play. So he does – via the Super NES Classic Edition – and provides an insight about the game's various flaws but well-thought out gameplay. Note: This episode was not originally intended to be an AVGN episode, but rather a personal review for James Rolfe to enjoy. It was later edited to be one and advertised by Rolfe on Cinemassacre's YouTube channel, with the video initially made available on Amazon Prime a week before it was released on YouTube.
157	2	"Dirty Harry"	11:38	May 24, 2018 (Amazon); June 24, 2018 (YouTube)
The Nerd questions whether his next bad game "feels lucky", as he looks at an NES game based on the Dirty Harry movie series that featured only three levels.
158	3	"Drake of the 99 Dragons"	13:29	September 5, 2018 (Amazon); September 25, 2018 (YouTube)
No meditation can prepare the Nerd for his first review of a bad Xbox game, Drake of the 99 Dragons – a game featuring well-made "Saturday cartoon" artwork that was intended to be the basis for a comic book series and animated show, but was foiled by its glitches, poor gameplay, controls, cutscenes, voice acting and graphics.
159	4	"Tomb Raider Games"	18:57	September 5, 2018 (Amazon); October 2, 2018 (YouTube)
While the Tomb Raider franchise has featured a variety of good games, the Nerd decides to raid the tombs of three that do Lara Croft no justice, and that were made for the PlayStation, PlayStation 2, and N-Gage.
160	5	"Resident Evil Survivor"	22:16	October 11, 2018 (Amazon); October 30, 2018 (YouTube)
For the annual Halloween Special, the Nerd reviews Resident Evil Survivor for the PlayStation.
161	6	"Super Hydlide and Virtual Hydlide"	20:14	October 12, 2018 (Amazon); November 6, 2018 (YouTube)
The Nerd returns to the Hydlide franchise with Super Hydlide for the Sega Genesis and Virtual Hydlide for the Sega Saturn.
162	7	"Amiga CD32"	28:23	November 19, 2018 (Amazon); November 20, 2018 (YouTube)
The Nerd takes on Commodore's failed console the Amiga CD32. The games he plays include Dangerous Streets, Super Putty, Morph, Naughty Ones, Beavers, Gloom, Diggers, Oscar, Bubba 'n' Stix, Surf Ninjas, Kang Fu and Zool.
163	8	"The Town with No Name"	15:52	December 4, 2018 (Amazon); December 5, 2018 (YouTube)
Continuing from the previous episode, the Nerd tackles the CDTV game The Town with No Name. Due to not owning the actual console that it was made for, he is forced to play it on the Amiga CD32.
164	9	"Home Alone Games with Macaulay Culkin"	19:03	December 14, 2018 (Amazon); December 15, 2018 (YouTube)
It is the Nerd's obligatory Christmas episode and he gets a surprise from Macaulay Culkin, or rather the Pizza Boy. The two sit down to review several Home Alone related games in the hopes of finding a good one. When they fail, they decide to set up traps for the terrible ones to stop them once and for all. Guest Stars: Macaulay Culkin as himself

=== Season 13 (2019) ===
No. overall	No. in season	Title	Time	Original release date
165	1	"Chronologically Confused about Kingdom Hearts"	10:28	January 23, 2019
The Nerd examines the scattered and drawn-out chronology of the Kingdom Hearts franchise.
166	2	"Video Game Magazines"	14:59	March 13, 2019
The Nerd takes a look at some of the lesser-known video game magazines from the past, excluding Nintendo Power. Magazines covered include: Atari Age, Game Players, VideoGames & Computer Entertainment, GamePro and Electronic Gaming Monthly.
167	3	"Aladdin Deck Enhancer"	21:45	April 10, 2019
The Nerd takes on the Aladdin Deck Enhancer, an infamous NES upgrade system with its own selection of games, and gets help from the likes of Aladdin and the Genie modeled after the Disney 1992 animated movie. Notes: Gaming Historian makes a cameo with the Nerd briefly watching his video on the Aladdin Deck Enhancer. The video also features brief appearances from Game Sack, Erin Plays, Bobdunga, Ircha Gaming, JLuv81, Candi's Classic Game Shrine, Stop Skeletons From Fighting, Cannot Be Tamed, Radical Reggie, Pixel Game Squad, Rocco Botte, John Riggs, Rerez, RGT 85, and Game Dave. This episode was made to commemorate the then-upcoming release of Aladdin (2019 remake).
168	4	"Pepsiman"	23:16	May 8, 2019
The Nerd attempts to review Yo! Noid, but gets interrupted by the arrival of Pepsiman who forces him to review the game of the same name. However, Pepsiman turns out to be evil and the Nerd gets the help of the Pepsi TV Game Guy who must use the power of Mentos to defeat him. Guest Stars: Mike Butters as the TV Game Guy and Xander Arnot as Pepsiman
169	5	"Superman 64 Returns!!"	19:09	June 5, 2019
The Nerd revisits the infamous Superman 64 11 years after first reviewing it.
170	6	"Life of Black Tiger with Gilbert Gottfried"	23:21	July 31, 2019
The Nerd decides to tackle a modern game for the PS4, Life of Black Tiger. He is so horrified at its incompetence that he sets out to look for the programmer who turns out to be recurring arch-nemesis Fred Fucks. Together, they must complete the game. Guest Stars: Gilbert Gottfried as Fred Fucks
171	7	"Chex Quest"	16:25	August 21, 2019
The Nerd takes a look at the Chex Quest video game from 1996 as well as its sequels and discovers that despite its bizarre and commercial premise, it is actually a well-made Doom copy.
172	8	"Jurassic Park: Trespasser"	24:21	September 25, 2019
The Nerd tries to get away for a vacation and ends up crashing onto an island full of people in inflatable dinosaur costumes and the game Trespasser for PC. Guest Stars: Shesez as himself and Seamus Blackley as himself
173	9	"The Immortal"	13:19	October 16, 2019
Shot in one continuous take, the Nerd explores a hidden dungeon in his house, while reviewing the NES port of The Immortal.
174	10	"Spawn Games"	22:17	November 27, 2019
Following being burned alive in the previous episode, the Nerd finds himself in Hell with the Violator in his clown form and is forced to play video games based on the Image Comics character Spawn. Guest Stars: Justin Silverman as Violator, Mike Matei as Woody Bugs, and Joe La Scola as the voice of the Devil
175	11	"The Legend of Zelda: Majora's Mask"	41:04	December 11, 2019
It is the end of the year as 2020 comes upon the Nerd. In a parody of the episode "The Masks" from The Twilight Zone, the Nerd punishes his three worst games, Teenage Mutant Ninja Turtles, Action 52, and Dr. Jekyll and Mr. Hyde, by forcing them to wear masks to the end of the world. And then, the Nerd decides to challenge himself by playing The Legend of Zelda: Majora's Mask, a Nintendo 64 game that is well beloved by many, but that he himself finds frustrating and abhorrent. Guest Star: Mr. Lobo as The Narrator

=== Season 14 (2020) ===
No. overall	No. in season	Title	Time	Original release date
176	1	"Raid 2020"	23:51	January 15, 2020
Eleven years after briefly mentioning this game when reviewing Color Dreams' games in "Bible Games 2", the Nerd finally tackles the game Raid 2020 in the year 2020.
177	2	"Mortal Kombat 1 Ports"	22:03	March 11, 2020
The Nerd finally decides to give the original Mortal Kombat the respect it deserves, by reviewing the home port versions.
178	3	"Mortal Kombat Rip-Offs"	22:25	April 8, 2020
The Nerd follows up his previous review with some rip offs including Time Killers, Street Fighter: The Movie, The Kung-Fu Master Jackie Chan, Tattoo Assassins and Shadow: War of Succession.
179	4	"Dennis the Menace"	18:31	May 13, 2020
Feeling that he has not reviewed an SNES game in a while, the Nerd reviews Dennis the Menace and delves briefly into the character's media history as he suffers through the games immense difficulty.
180	5	"The Incredible Crash Dummies"	19:06	June 30, 2020
The Nerd overviews the history of The Incredible Crash Dummies franchise, and its LJN published video game.
181	6	"Bad Final Fight Games"	17:42	July 30, 2020
The Nerd looks at Final Fight Revenge and Final Fight: Streetwise, two games widely considered to be among the worst of the Final Fight franchise. Guest Star: Matthew Kowalewski as Matt McMuscles
182	7	"Mission: Impossible"	15:45	August 21, 2020
The Nerd looks at Mission: Impossible for the N64 that is published by Ocean, he also briefly talks about the TV series and movies. Guest Stars: Justin Whang as The BGF Director and Evan Ferrante as Tom Cruise Look-Alike
183	8	"Ecco the Dolphin"	16:44	September 30, 2020
The Nerd looks at the classic Sega Genesis game Ecco the Dolphin and wonders why such a frustrating game was heavily marketed by Sega.
184	9	"Countdown Vampires"	16:29	October 29, 2020
The Nerd is unable to go all out Halloween 2020 due to the COVID-19 pandemic, but that will not stop him from reviewing Countdown Vampires, a lower tier clone of the Resident Evil franchise.
185	10	"The Legend of Kage"	15:55	November 13, 2020
After repairing the Nintoaster, the Nerd takes a look at The Legend of Kage arcade port for the NES, and asserts its pronunciation as "KAH-GAY".
186	11	"Taito Legends"	34:28	November 30, 2020
Following his The Legend of Kage review, the Nerd looks at other Taito titles with Taito Legends and Taito Legends 2.
187	12	"The Simpsons: Bartman Meets Radioactive Man"	14:07	December 15, 2020
After an intro which parodies that of The Simpsons, the Nerd reviews the last of the three Simpsons games The Simpsons: Bartman Meets Radioactive Man released for the NES.

=== Season 15 (2021) ===
No. overall	No. in season	Title	Time	Original release date
188	1	"Shrek: Fairy Tale Freakdown"	15:51	March 15, 2021
The Nerd tries to watch the movie Shrek on the Game Boy Advance Video through the Game Boy Player, but finds that it does not work. He decides to play the reviled Shrek: Fairy Tale Freakdown and ends up running afoul of a Shrek cult when he calls the film overrated in a parody of The Wicker Man.
189	2	"Darkman"	20:07	March 30, 2021
Depressed over still not being able to go out due to COVID-19, the Nerd decides to hunker down and review the video game Darkman on the NES based on the movie of the same name.
190	3	"Fear and Loathing in Vegas Stakes"	26:57	April 30, 2021
In a parody of Fear and Loathing in Las Vegas, the Nerd, as Raoul Duke, and his attorney speed down the road with a collection of classic games to play once they get to Las Vegas. In flashback, the Nerd reviews the Vegas based games Vegas Dream and Vegas Stakes and while on the road reviews Road Runner's Death Valley Rally and encounter Spider-Man. Upon arriving, the Nerd reviews Caesars Palace, Pac-Kong, and LSD: Dream Emulator and reflects on his history as a "shitty game" reviewer.
191	4	"3DO Interactive Multiplayer"	21:23	May 14, 2021
The Nerd finally covers the 3DO Interactive Multiplayer, having previously mentioned it, and talks about its history and high price. The games he covers are Crash 'n Burn, Road Rash, Gex, Captain Quazar, Soccer Kid, Battle Chess, The Horde, Super Street Fighter II Turbo, Way of the Warrior, Virtuoso, Alone in the Dark, Cyberia, PO'ed, Doom, Demolition Man, Hell, Mad Dog McCree, and Crime Patrol.
192	5	"Corpse Killer"	15:42	May 28, 2021
After failing to review the zombie game Corpse Killer on the Sega CD due to technical issues, the Nerd finally takes a crack at reviewing it on the 3DO Interactive Multiplayer.
193	6	"Sega Game Gear VHS Tapes"	12:18	June 18, 2021
The Nerd tears into a series of quirky promotional tapes released by Sega featuring the Game Gear and corporate sponsors like Howard Johnson's.
194	7	"Carmageddon 64"	10:53	July 9, 2021
The Nerd takes a look at Carmageddon 64, the infamously bad Nintendo 64 port of Carmageddon II: Carpocalypse Now.
195	8	"Pac-Man 2: The New Adventures"	9:01	July 30, 2021
The Nerd plays the Sega Genesis version of Pac-Man 2: The New Adventures, a game far removed from the rest of the series.
196	9	"The Rocketeer"	18:01	August 20, 2021
The Nerd reviews The Rocketeer for NES and SNES while also commenting on his shirt.
197	10	"Greendog: The Beached Surfer Dude!"	15:20	September 10, 2021
In order to relax, the Nerd plays the incredibly bizarre Greendog: The Beached Surfer Dude! for the Sega Genesis. His anger towards it results in him dropping the game into literal lava.
198	11	"Commodore 64"	30:52	September 25, 2021
Having reviewed a handful of games on it, the Nerd decides to actually cover the Commodore 64 itself and the various games on it while also covering the history of the company behind it.
199	12	"Freddy & Jason Commodore 64"	24:15	October 27, 2021
The Nerd does his annual Halloween episode by reviewing some horror-based games on the Commodore 64. While reviewing Friday the 13th and A Nightmare on Elm Street, the Nerd gets attacked by Jason Voorhees and Freddy Krueger who are out for revenge.
200a	13a	"LJN History and Movie Games"	25:18	December 7, 2021
In part one of The Angry Video Game Nerd 200th episode, the Nerd talks about the history of LJN before going through the remainder of the LJN library, starting with the movie based games. Additionally, the Nerd becomes the official owner of the company and hires Sam Beddoes to help make an improved version of Back to the Future on NES.
200b	13b	"LJN Sports and Marvel Games"	25:15	December 10, 2021
In part two of The Angry Video Game Nerd 200th episode, the Nerd covers sports games and Marvel related games from the LJN library. Meanwhile, Sam Beddoes continues to try and redo Back to the Future on NES, but continues to run into numerous problems relating to the NES hardware that upsets the Nerd, causing him to be confronted by another Nerd.
200c	13c	"LJN Wrestling and Other Games"	26:57	December 21, 2021
In the third and final part of The Angry Video Game Nerd 200th episode, the Nerd covers wrestling games and other miscellaneous games from the LJN library. Upon completing his look at every LJN game, Sam Beddoes finishes his Back to the Future game, which turns out to be every bit as bad as the original. After the Nerd is confronted by the Angry Angry Video Game Nerd Nerd, he finally comes to the realization that making a video game is hard and forgives all bad games (except for Dr. Jekyll and Mr. Hyde on NES).

=== Season 16 (2022) ===
No. overall	No. in season	Title	Time	Original release date
201	1	"The Last Ninja"	27:27	March 17, 2022
The Nerd watches an old video of himself reviewing The Last Ninja on NES from earlier in his career. In the modern day, he decides to revisit the game with a noticeably more upbeat personality following the previous episode, but this does not last and before long he returns to his old angry persona. The Nerd eventually beats the game, much to the dismay of Ernie from Sesame Street, who later engages in a duel, to which the Nerd emerges victorious.
202	2	"Contra How I Remember It"	28:18	April 28, 2022
After using a monkey's paw to wish for a good game to play, the Nerd gets his wish, after getting punched in the face by the monkey who lost his paw to begin with. The Nerd covers Contra and Super Contra and recalls how the game was a part of his childhood. He also covers the bad Contra games, including Contra Force, Contra: Legacy of War, and C: The Contra Adventure.
203	3	"Purr Pals"	17:58	June 23, 2022
The Nerd makes due to his promise to start reviewing games for the Wii. After going through some lackluster party games including Imagine: Party Babyz, Balls of Fury, Monkey Mischief! Party Time, and Billy the Wizard: Rocket Broomstick Racing, he sets his sights on Purr Pals while his real life cat Yeti watches him. This culminates in him discovering a mini-game where one must literally scoop "cat turds" from a litter box. Note: This episode was dedicated to Boo, one of James Rolfe's cats, who died in 2020, two years prior to this episode.
204	4	"Hudson Hawk"	18:24	August 31, 2022
When it comes to movie-based games, you would think the Nerd covered them all by now, but there is another one based on the Bruce Willis film, Hudson Hawk on NES.
205	5	"Doom"	29:08	October 30, 2022
While waiting for his copy of Doom to load on his Commodore 64, the Nerd makes a deal with the Icon of Sin to play various versions of Doom, ranging from good, bad, and downright ugly. Guest Star: John Romero as himself and the voice of the Icon of Sin
206	6	"Garfield"	26:16	December 22, 2022
It is Christmas time again as the Nerd dons a Santa hat and decides to review video games based on the beloved comic strip Garfield, starting with the unreleased Atari game, the Japanese exclusive A Week of Garfield on the Famicom, and the Sega Genesis game Garfield: Caught in the Act, and then proceeds to fall down a rabbit hole with Garfield Labyrinth on Game Boy and its complex ties with the Crazy Castle series. This culminates in the Nerd getting a visit from the one who started it all: Bugs Bunny.

=== Season 17 (2023) ===
No. overall	No. in season	Title	Time	Original release date
207	1	"Kid Icarus"	21:48	February 24, 2023
The Nerd takes a look at the classic Nintendo title Kid Icarus which he does consider to be a classic title in the NES library despite its frustrating and rage inducing gameplay. He also dishes out some rather archaic and nasty mythological stories of ancient heroes.
208	2	"Earthworm Jim Trilogy"	26:57	April 28, 2023
The Nerd talks about the iconic 1990s game Earthworm Jim and its offbeat style of humor. Before he can enjoy himself, the Nerd follows up the review with Earthworm Jim 2 and Earthworm Jim 3D, both of which are considered inferior. Note: This is the first episode to be filmed in 4K 60 frames per second.
209	3	"Indiana Jones: Crystal Skull + More"	26:19	June 30, 2023
This episode is built as a Part 2 to the 2008 Indiana Jones episode, where the Nerd is playing more Indiana Jones games in the past on the release day of the movie Indiana Jones and the Kingdom of the Crystal Skull, while another part of the episode is set in the current time with the Nerd reverting time with the Dial of Destiny from Indiana Jones and the Dial of Destiny. Note: This episode was made to celebrate the release of Indiana Jones and the Dial of Destiny.
210	4	"A Boy and His Blob"	18:59	August 24, 2023
The Nerd is opening up a bag of jelly beans and flipping through the pages of Nintendo Power, in his quest to beat the David Crane NES classic, A Boy and His Blob: Trouble on Blobolonia.
211	5	"Beating Jekyll and Hyde"	26:50	October 27, 2023
In a parody of The Exorcist, the Nerd tackles Dr. Jekyll and Mr. Hyde for the third time, both on NES and Famicom, which means the Nerd will have his final confrontation with the NES game that has tortured him his entire life. He recruits his older self, a wiser, more Fatherly Nerd, who travels back in time to help the younger Nerd finally beat the game and exorcise it once and for all.
212	6	"Final Fantasy 6"	34:27	December 22, 2023
This Christmas, the Nerd crosses another game off his bucket list with the SNES RPG classic, Final Fantasy III, or Final Fantasy VI as it is known outside the United States.

=== Season 18 (2024) ===
No. overall	No. in season	Title	Time	Original release date
213	1	"The Goonies 1 & 2"	26:12	February 25, 2024
Once again, the Nerd tackles another movie licensed game as he heads under the "Goon Docks" to dig up buried treasure, but instead of One-Eyed Willie's gold, he finds something worse than the Fratellis: The Japan exclusive The Goonies for the Famicom and its American sequel The Goonies II for the NES.
214	2	"My Horse Prince"	20:00	April 19, 2024
The Nerd decided to upgrade his cellphone to an iPhone and try out mobile gaming for the first time ever with the incredibly bizarre and deranged dating sim My Horse Prince, which features an anime girl and a talking horse with an attractive human face!
215	3	"What Is the Best Castlevania?"	25:10	May 8, 2024
The Nerd celebrates 20 years of The Angry Video Game Nerd, with the series that started it all, and this time, he's going to decide what the greatest Castlevania game of all time is for good!
216	4	"SimCity"	19:17	June 25, 2024
The Nerd plays a Super Nintendo classic as he tries to achieve a lifelong dream of getting a Megalopolis and Mario statue in SimCity, at any cost!
217	5	"Glover"	17:03	July 28, 2024
The Nerd conducts his review of Glover for the Nintendo 64. He criticizes the game for its hard-to-learn controls and difficult level design. He then wrecks his copy and tries the PS1 version, which happens to be much easier than the N64 version, much to his dismay.
218	6	"Deja Vu"	22:45	August 28, 2024
The Nerd wakes up with a throbbing headache and his memories missing, so he searches his NES library for clues in hopes to solve the mystery and end this bad case of Déjà Vu!
219	7	"Nosferatu"	19:41	October 27, 2024
The Nerd digs up another vampire game for the Super Nintendo. But instead of Dracula, this one is based on the classic silent horror film based on Dracula, known simply as... Nosferatu!
220	8	"Blaster Master"	20:18	November 26, 2024
The Nerd grabs his A.I. Controller and jumps down the Sunsoft frog hole to play the NES classic Blaster Master! Guest Star: John DePasquale as A.I. Man
221	9	"Game Glitches: The Legacy Sequel"	25:53	December 20, 2024
The Nerd enlists the help of the Game Graphic Glitch Gremlin to take down the A.I. Man. Later, the Game Graphic Glitch Gremlin and his wife, Mrs. Gremlin, gift the Nerd a PlayStation 2 Holiday 2004 demo disc containing the Viewtiful Joe 2 demo, which then erases the saves on the Nerd's PS2 memory card. Guest Stars: John DePasquale as A.I. Man, Kevin Finn as the Game Graphic Glitch Gremlin, and Nicolette Shutty as Mrs. Gremlin

=== Season 19 (2025) ===
No. overall	No. in season	Title	Time	Original release date
222	1	"Gex Trilogy"	23:56	February 24, 2025
The Nerd is looking at the only video game mascot series starring a gecko! Originally 3DO's answer to Mario and Sonic, Gex would go on to spawn two sequels with Gex: Enter the Gecko and Gex 3: Deep Cover Gecko.
223	2	"Video Game Commercials"	18:15	March 4, 2025
The Nerd takes a look back at some of his favorite retro video game commercials after referencing them for years.
224	3	"Dragon's Lair Re-Revisited"	25:11	May 16, 2025
The Nerd revisits a game that he couldn't even get past the first screen on in the past, now with the sole purpose of beating it: Dragon's Lair for the NES!
225	4	"Metroid: Original Trilogy"	35:58	June 25, 2025
The Nerd takes a look back at the Metroid series' early beginnings with the original Metroid on NES, Metroid II: Return of Samus on Game Boy, and Super Metroid on SNES!
226	5	"Mario Paint with GWAR"	22:06	August 29, 2025
The Nerd pulls out the SNES Mouse to play a Nintendo classic, Mario Paint on SNES, with very special guests Grodius Maximus and Sawborg Destructo of the heavy metal band Gwar! Guest Stars: Tommy Meehan as Grodius Maximus and Matt Maguire as Sawborg Destructo
227	6	"Werewolf: The Last Warrior"	23:03	October 27, 2025
The Nerd battles his primitive urge to curse while playing through Werewolf: The Last Warrior on NES before succumbing to his fate and transforming into a Swearwolf!
228	7	"Timecop"	19:05	November 7, 2025
The Nerd goes back to the future with a game based on a movie starring Jean-Claude Van Damme as a time-traveling special agent, Timecop!
229	8	"E.T. Interplanetary Mission"	19:45	December 18, 2025
The Nerd celebrates the Christmas season by being good and playing another E.T. game, this time on PlayStation!

=== Season 20 (2026) ===
No. overall	No. in season	Title	Time	Original release date
230	1	"Contra Force"	20:38	February 6, 2026
The Nerd plays possibly the worst Contra game ever made: Contra Force on NES!
231	2	"ToeJam & Earl with Scott the Woz"	19:19	March 25, 2026
The Nerd teams up with Scott the Woz to tackle ToeJam & Earl on the Sega Genesis! It is a game about two alien rappers, random presents, and trying not to fall off the planet. It's weird, confusing, creative as hell, and exactly the kind of game that leaves the Nerd asking, "What were they thinking?!" Guest Star: Scott the Woz as himself
232	3	"Crash Bandicoot Games with Caddicarus"	23:49	July 17, 2026
The Nerd takes a look at the wild history of Crash Bandicoot, from the original PlayStation classic to the strange sequels that followed. With a little "help" from special guest Caddicarus, the Nerd dives into platforming, kart racing, party games, crossovers, and some of the weirdest moments in Crash history. Guest Star: Caddicarus as Spons, Australian Guy, and Wanku-Wanku
233	4	"Beating Bubble Bobble"	25:29	August 12, 2026
The Nerd learns that beating Bubble Bobble the right way takes more than one player. To reach the true ending, he has to bring in a very special guest. Together they blow bubbles, trap enemies, dodge Grumple Grommit (aka "Super Drunk"), decode the game's bizarre on-screen messages, and grind through both loops to earn the ending most people never saw back in the day. Guest Star: Kyle Justin as Guitar Guy
234	5	"Batman: Dark Tomorrow"	40:44	September 17, 2026
The Joker is back and forces the Nerd to take on Kemco's notorious GameCube action-adventure, one of the most reviled Batman games ever made thanks to its broken controls, confusing level design, and infamous ending. Guest Star: Mike Matei as the Joker
235	6	"Maniac Mansion"	17:27	October 23, 2026
The Nerd takes on Lucasfilm Games’ cult classic point-and-click adventure, published on NES by Jaleco in 1990. A haunted house packed with a mad scientist, sentient tentacles, killer plants, and a mysterious meteor sounds right up his alley. But he is stuck dragging a cursor with the D-pad, guessing commands, and pixel hunting in the dark. Between nuking the mansion and blowing up a hamster in the microwave, the frustration is real. Nintendo Power claimed even tuna heads would be hooked by this one.
236	7	"Cliffhanger"	16:58	November 13, 2026
The Nerd charts a course up both 1993 games based on the Sylvester Stallone movie, from lowly side-scrollers to the higher peak of beat ’em ups. Taking out bad guys on a frozen mountain should make for an awesome game... instead it’s bats, spike pits, and the "worst gun on NES." Stallone should have been more aware what crap his likeness would be used for.
237	8	TBA	TBA	December 2026

== Related videos ==
=== Cinemassacre ===
The following collection of videos features appearances by either James Rolfe, or his character The Nerd:

Episode name	Length	Release date	Episode Summary / Notes
Wizard of Oz 3: Dorothy Goes to Hell	23:00	June 11, 2006	James Rolfe and Mike Matei take part in a spoof, animated sequel of both The Wizard of Oz and Return to Oz. Note: Although technically not a video involving the Nerd, two characters from the film would later go on to feature in the AVGN series.
The Anger Begins	1:28	September 29, 2006	Footage from a 1988 home video of a young James Rolfe, getting angry at his Super Mario Bros. game on his birthday.
AVGN Extra - E3 2007	3:42	July 21, 2007	The Nerd recalls the events of GameTrailers flying him to E3.
What Was I Thinking?	10:16	November 10, 2007	A short biopic included on the AVGN Volume 1 DVD.
Top Ten Nerd Moments 2007	9:23	January 1, 2008	A look back to the top ten best moments from the 2007 series of Angry Video Game Nerd.
AVGN responds to the Nostalgia Critic!	2:02	June 12, 2008	The Nerd decides to make his response to the rants made by the Critic, as part of their feud.
AVGN: E3 recap 2008	5:32	July 19, 2008	The Nerd heads out to the E3 event for 2008, and takes a moment to recap some of his favorite games.
AVGN: PROMO – Deadly Towers: Special Episode	2:26	July 20, 2008	As the Nerd prepares for his upcoming review of Deadly Towers for the NES, James Rolfe takes a moment to challenge viewers and fans of the Angry Video Game Nerd to help with writing the episode.
Bad Movie Review	7:28	July 28, 2008	As part of an agreement with the Critic, the Nerd prepares to tackle reviewing a bad movie – Ricky 1.
Chronologically Confused About AC/DC	5:19	September 30, 2008	The Nerd rants about the inconsistency of available songs on the band's international albums and those in its native Australia.
Frankenstein Outtake	0:30	November 4, 2008	A look at the outtakes made during production of the AVGN Halloween special of Frankenstein.
Cinemassacre 200	23:04	December 20, 2008	An autobiographic film.
My NES Collection	6:15	March 7, 2009	James Rolfe gives an overview to viewers of his collection of NES games.
Mike and I playing Odyssey	5:53	April 27, 2009	James and Mike play the Odyssey in preparation for the AVGN episode Magnavox Odyssey.
Ghostbusters Xbox 360 Review	6:46	August 13, 2009	James Rolfe gives his review of Ghostbusters: The Video Game for the Xbox 360. Note: This video included a brief cameo by Rolfe's character, the Nerd.
Crazy Castle Outtake	4:42	August 20, 2009	A collection of outtakes made during production of the AVGN episode that reviewed the Crazy Castle series.
The History of Super Mecha Death Christ	6:57	November 25, 2009	The Nerd gives viewers the history behind Super Mecha Death Christ 2000 BC 4.0 Beta.
Top 20 AVGN Rants	15:48	March 17, 2010	As he takes a break, the Nerd takes this moment to pick his personal top 20 favourite rants he has made.
Holiday Memories	13:30	December 7, 2010	The Nerd decides to revisits the holiday specials from the past four years that he made.
Hanging Out in the Nerd Room	15:13	December 15, 2010	James Rolfe and Mike Matei take a walk around the Nerd Room used for filming of Angry Video Game Nerd. Note: Before the episode was posted onto YouTube, it was originally available as part of the AVGN DVD Vol. 4.
Chronologically Confused About TMNT DVDs	7:40	April 26, 2011	The Nerd rants about various issues with the DVD availability of both the 1987 and 2003 Teenage Mutant Ninja Turtles cartoon series.
TMNT Tournament Fighter Challenge SNES	5:36	June 21, 2011	James Rolfe and Mike Matei take part in a challenge – playing TMNT Tournament Fighter as part of the Turtle Tuesdays series.
Ninja Baseball Bat Man	3:31	July 29, 2011	The Nerd takes a moment to review an arcade classic – Ninja Baseball Bat Man.
Contra Memories	7:13	November 2, 2011	James Rolfe takes a moment with viewers to recall his memories of playing and beating the original Contra video game for the NES. Note: This video later spawned five more segments titled Nerd Memories published by GameTrailers.com.
SNES vs. Sega Genesis, Parts 1 and 2	26:45 (combined)	August 14, 2012 (Part 1); August 16, 2012 (Part 2)	In a two-part video special, James Rolfe talks about his experiences with the 16-Bit Wars and the two consoles involved – the SNES and Genesis. Note: A combined version of the two parts was later released on August 17, 2012.
The Nerd's Anger Management	32:26	August 30, 2012 (Cinemassacre); June 28, 2017 (YouTube)	In this audio only video, the Nerd shows the viewer how to relax.
Mike talks about the AVGN Experience	17:46	November 8, 2012	Mike Matei discusses his involvement with the AVGN videos, and gives his outside perspective of AVGN and Rolfe's other films.
Abandoned AVGN Episode: Secret Scout	4:32	December 5, 2012 (DVD); April 30, 2014 (YouTube)	James Rolfe gives viewers and fans of Angry Video Game Nerd a look at an abandoned, unfinished review for Secret Scout for the NES. Note: Prior to its release on YouTube, the video was a part of the AVGN Volume 6 DVD.
Magfest 2013 AVGN Panel	13:03	January 15, 2013; February 19, 2013 (YouTube)	James Rolfe goes to Magfest 2013 and asks the audience several questions, re-enacts quotes from various AVGN episodes, and allows them to play some video games that he reviewed.
The Original Nerd Room	4:15	December 13, 2013 (DVD); May 20, 2014 (YouTube)	James Rolfe returns to his childhood room where he filmed the first two AVGN episodes almost ten years earlier, and gives a brief overview.
Nerd Room Tour 2013	8:35	December 13, 2013 (DVD); May 30, 2020 (YouTube)	New overview of the Nerd room for the Season 7 DVD.
Video Games!! – Board James (Episode 25) with AVGN	11:18	September 5, 2015	The Nerd helps Board James review a number of video game related board games.
Dr. Jekyll and Mr. Hyde – The Game: The Movie Trailer	3:57	November 24, 2015	A Cinemassacre short spoofing the Dr. Jekyll and Mr. Hyde NES game.
THANK YOU!! 2 million YouTube Subscribers!	2:04	March 8, 2016	James/The Nerd does a shout out to his fans regarding his upcoming 10th anniversary of broadcasting on YouTube.
AVGN Auction for Charity	7:02	April 12, 2016	James Rolfe announces an auction charity event to viewers and fans of Angry Video Game Nerd, in which the proceeds from the sales of various props and other items will go to Shriners Hospitals for Children.
AVGN Script Collection PART 1 (of 3) for charity	30:56	April 20, 2016	In a three-part video, James Rolfe and Mike Matei go over AVGN scripts.
AVGN Script Collection PART 2 (of 3) for charity	25:18	April 27, 2016	In a three-part video, James Rolfe and Mike Matei go over AVGN scripts.
AVGN Script Collection PART 3 (of 3) for charity	25:31	May 4, 2016	In a three-part video, James Rolfe and Mike Matei go over AVGN scripts.
AVGN Presents "ASTRO BASTARDS" Trailer	4:30	December 22, 2016	The Nerd gives a presentation of a Cinemassacre short.
AVGN Anime Transformation	0:41	February 7, 2017	A brief anime style short to an AVGN theme.
Medusa Heads	1:18	April 3, 2017	A Cinemassacre animated short involving the Nerd, using audio from the "Castlevania, Part 1" episode.
AVGN Zelda II – Cinemassacre Animated	1:12	June 18, 2017	A Cinemassacre animated short to Zelda II, with audio excerpts from the related AVGN episode.
Top 10 AVGN Episodes	9:51	August 4, 2017	James Rolfe gives his personal opinion of the 10 best AVGN episodes.
AVGN Anime Part 2	1:41	November 27, 2017	A follow-up to AVGN Anime Transformation.
Top 10 AVGN Moments of 2018	8:58	December 31, 2018	The channel's top 10 moments of the year.
Cinemassacre Rental Reviews – Kazaam Review (1996)	23:39	April 19, 2019	The CGI genie from the AVGN episode "Aladdin Deck Enhancer" makes an appearance.
AVGN Commercial & Trailer Reel	22:00	December 18, 2019	A compilation of (mostly) AVGN related trailer spoofs.
AVGN's Yule Log of Video Games	1:02:00	December 22, 2019	A montage of the Nerd burning various poor games over an open fire with Holiday music playing.
Top 2019 AVGN Moments	12:30	December 31, 2019	A 2019 recap.
AVGN in Duck Hunt	4:59	April 22, 2020	The Nerd appears in an animated homage to Duck Hunt in the style of Looney Tunes.
AVGN 1&2 Deluxe – Release Trailer (Switch and Steam)	1:24	October 30, 2020	Promotion for the upgraded rerelease of Angry Video Game Nerd Adventures I & II.
AVGN 1&2 Deluxe – Extended Trailer	1:49	November 17, 2020	A more in depth trailer for Angry Video Game Nerd I & II Deluxe
The Making of AVGN 1&2 Deluxe – Video Game Documentary	23:23	November 27, 2020	A documentary of the repackaging of the Angry Video Game Nerd Adventures games.
Why Batman Returns is a Christmas Movie	12:24	December 11, 2020	The Nerd does a brief commercial in an otherwise non-AVGN review.
AVGN Holiday Memories 2006–2020	27:35	December 22, 2020	A montage of Nerd Holiday episodes.
Top 10 AVGN Moments of 2020	12:34	December 29, 2020	Annual Top 10 countdown of 2020.
Dragon Quest's Timeline - Chronologically Confused	22:16	February 4, 2021	Another Chronologically Confused audio/visual narrative, though this one features James instead of the Nerd character.
AVGN 1&2 Deluxe Coming Soon to Xbox and PlayStation!!	1:03	February 26, 2021	Update of AVGN 1&2 Deluxe.
New 'Rex Viper' song coming THIS Friday!!	1:47	March 2, 2021	James Rolfe uses his "Big Rigs" Trucker persona to promote the musical group Rex Viper and their upcoming Back to the Future video.
Rex Viper - Nintendo Power of Love (Music Video)	5:31	March 5, 2021	The Rex Viper video premieres on Cinemassacre feat. James Rolfe. The Nerd doesn't appear but it satirizes the Back to the Future video game published by LJN with which the Nerd has long been associated.
Michelangelo Crashes an AVGN Panel	9:09	June 4, 2021	Voice actor Robbie Rist at an AVGN panel.
Rex Viper - Hearts on Fire (Music Video)	6:04	July 15, 2021	Cinemassacre collaborates with Rex Viper again; this time with a cover of John Cafferty's "Heart's on Fire" from the soundtrack of Rocky IV. Displays training montages from various video games including The Karate Kid and Rocky.
Rex Viper - Eye of the Tiger Electronics (Music Video)	5:59	September 17, 2021	Rex Viper does a cover of Survivor's "Eye of the Tiger" (from the soundtrack of Rocky III) in relation to the Tiger Electronics LCD games. Includes clips of the Nerd from the "Tiger Electronic Games" episode.
James' Most Memorable AVGN Moments	16:54	November 19, 2021	A retrospective on Nerd history.
The AVGN Nerd Room Game Booth - How Was it Made?	6:33	February 14, 2025	Mini-doc on a replica of the Nerd Room used for MAGFest.
Angry Video Game Nerd - Every Halloween Episode So Far	6:24:06	September 26, 2025	A collection of every Halloween episode up to this point.
Miracle Piano (NES) Lost Angry Nintendo Nerd episode from 2006	3:45	April 6, 2026	A short clip from an unfinished AVGN episode from 2006, released on the series' 20th anniversary on YouTube.
World War Web: Nerd Vs Critic	58:56	September 26, 2026	A legacy special reflecting on the storyline feud between the Angry Video Game Nerd and Nostalgia Critic, featuring James Rolfe and Doug Walker both in and out of character.

=== ScrewAttack ===
The following collection of videos features appearances by either James Rolfe, or his character The Nerd:

Episode name	Length	Release date	Episode Summary / Notes
ScrewAttack's Movie Quote of the Week – Doom	1:29	June 20, 2006	The Nerd makes an appearance in ScrewAttack's Movie Quote series commenting on a specific line of dialogue from the 2005 Doom film.
ScrewAttack's Movie Quote – Pokémon	1:32	July 14, 2006	The Nerd comments on the Pokémon anime.
Toilet Tuesday	0:36	August 27, 2006	The Nerd stars in a parody of internet meme "Nintendo 64 Kid", as part of ScrewAttack's Toilet Tuesday series.
Angry Nerd's Movie Quote of the Week – Street Fighter	0:57	September 5, 2006	A Nerd commentary on a line from Street Fighter.
Angry Nerd's Movie Quote of the Week – another Pokémon.	0:22	September 23, 2006	Another Nerd commentary on a line from the Pokémon anime.
Wii Salute (History of Video Game Wars)	4:49	November 19, 2006	The Nerd goes over the history and competition between video game consoles, by re-enacting them through a series of hand puppet "consoles".
Top 10 Angry Video Game Nerd Moments of 2006	4:08	December 31, 2006	A look back at the top ten best moments from the 2006 series of Angry Video Game Nerd.
DuckTales (Video Game Vault, a ScrewAttack featurette)	1:53	February 10, 2007	The Nerd helps out with ScrewAttack's Video Game Vault series, by reviewing DuckTales for the NES.
The Best and Worst Gaming Peripherals	7:30	May 8, 2007	This episode on ScrewAttack featured a brief appearance by the Nerd about the fourth worst video game peripheral – the Power Glove.
Top 10 AVGN Moments of 2008	12:48	February 26, 2009	A look back at the top ten best moments from the 2008 series of Angry Video Game Nerd.
The Worst EVER! – Villains feat. brentalfloss and the Angry Video Game Nerd	6:13	January 18, 2014	James Rolfe, brentalfloss, and a number of others offer their opinions on the worst video game villains.
Top 10 Drunks in Video Games	6:33	August 21, 2015	The Nerd's appearance in this episode is mostly for his own (ScrewAttack published) game, Angry Video Game Nerd Adventures, that came eighth in the episode's list.
Top 10 WORST NES Games with the Angry Video Game Nerd	6:55	December 4, 2015	The Nerd hosts a special edition of ScrewAttack Top 10, as he looks at his personal ten worst games of the Nintendo Entertainment System.

=== Channel Awesome ===
The following collection of videos features appearances by either James Rolfe, or his character The Nerd. This includes Channel Awesome's collection of videos from the special crossover series between Angry Video Game Nerd and Nostalgia Critic:

Episode name	Length	Release date	Episode Summary / Notes
Nostalgia Critic – Nerd Rant	2:15	April 5, 2008	The Critic rants about his resentment towards the comparisons between himself and the Nerd, and issues an ultimatum against his new rival.
Nostalgia Critic – Nerd Rant 2	4:47	April 19, 2008	The Critic is surprised to find a compliment on the Nerd's forum, but suspects it hides a carefully disguised insult, so attempts to find it.
Nostalgia Critic – Nerd Rant 3	2:52	April 23, 2008	The Critic rants about how the Nerd beat him to reviewing a movie he planned to review, and issues another ultimatum against his rival.
The Wizard - Nostalgia Critic	16:16	May 8, 2008	Critic's review of The Wizard. The Nerd does not appear but the episode conclusion ties in to their storyline feud.
AVGN Responds to the Nostalgia Critic	2:03	June 12, 2008	The Nerd responds to Nostalgia Critic about his complaints, but a strange response shocks Nostalgia Critic.
Nerd Challenge	2:38	June 15, 2008	The Critic takes a look over the Nerd's response to his rants, and issues him a challenge.
The Battle of Epic Proportions	4:26	June 29, 2008	The Critic finally comes face to face with the Nerd, where along with issuing his challenge again and receiving a counter-challenge, the pair of them get involved in a three way brawl between themselves and an unsuspecting Captain S.
Bad Movie Review	7:27	July 23, 2008	As part of an agreement with the Critic, the Nerd prepares to tackle reviewing a bad movie – Ricky 1
Video Game Review	12:16	August 3, 2008	As part of an agreement with the Nerd, the Critic prepares to tackle reviewing a bad video game – Bebe's Kids for the SNES. Notes: This special cross-over episode with the Angry Video Game Nerd, featured a cameo appearance by Kyle Justin, performing an alternate version of the AVGN theme.
NC vs. AVGN: Last Showdown	4:26	September 24, 2008	The Critic once more rants about the Nerd, until his video is hijacked by his rival, leading the pair to finally announce a final battle between them at the Nerd's home.
AVGN vs. NC: The Final Battle	7:18	October 10, 2008	The Critic and Nerd meet again and undertake an epic battle between themselves to see who will win.
One Year Anniversary Brawl	20:13	May 10, 2009	The Critic and Nerd cross paths once more and do battle, only this time they are joined by Nostalgia Chick, Kyle Justin, and various others from ThatGuyWiththeGlasses.com in a massive brawl between gamers and reviewers.
Atop the Fourth Wall, Episode 29: Wolverine: Adamantium Rage	17:50	May 15, 2009	As part of a review on "Channel Awesome" for Wolverine: Adamantium Rage for the Genesis, James Rolfe makes a brief cameo in this episode as the Nerd.
Critic and Nerd Joint Review	18:14	June 10, 2009	After having made a truce in their epic brawl between them, the Critic and Nerd work together to review Teenage Mutant Ninja Turtles: The Making of the Coming Out of Their Shells Tour in 1990.
To Boldy Flee: Part 8	45:17	September 14, 2012	James Rolfe/The Nerd makes a guest appearance in the final part of Channel Awesome's Year Four event.
Nostalgia Critic: AVGN Movie Review	20:11	December 14, 2014	Having lost a bet to the Nerd, the Critic finds himself forced to review his new film – Angry Video Game Nerd: The Movie. Notes: Until it was posted online to Channel Awesome, this video was an exclusive feature on the film's Blu-ray release.
Nostalgia Critic & AVGN: TMNT 2014	35:18	April 1, 2015	The Nerd joins forces with the Critic, as they work together to review the 2014 Teenage Mutant Ninja Turtles film.
Shut Up and Talk: James Rolfe	26:51	September 5, 2015	Doug Walker and James Rolfe take a break from their online work, to come together and talk shop on careers, family and future ambitions.
Hammerman – Was That Real?	12:31	September 16, 2015	As part of Doug Walker's Nostalgia Critic review of Hammerman, James Rolfe makes a guest appearance as The Nerd.
Can an Ending Ruin a Film?	12:31	November 2, 2016	James Rolfe makes an appearance at the end of a Nostalgia Critic commentary as the Nerd, to promote their upcoming joint review.
TMNT: Out of the Shadows – Nostalgia Critic	33:17	November 9, 2016	The Critic is joined by the Nerd, Andre of Black Nerd Comedy, and Jon Bailey of Honest Trailers, as they come together to review the sequel to the 2014 film – Teenage Mutant Ninja Turtles: Out of the Shadows.
The Mummy – Nostalgia Critic	29:20	October 25, 2017	James Rolfe makes a guest appearance as the Nerd, at the end of Doug Walker's Nostalgia Critic review of the 1999 remake of The Mummy, to promote their upcoming joint review of the 2017 remake.
The Mummy (2017) – Nostalgia Critic	26:11	November 1, 2017	The Critic and Nerd both work together to rip apart the newest iteration of The Mummy, released in 2017.
The Most HATED Nutcracker Movie Ever Made – Nostalgia Critic	42:29	December 19, 2018	The Nerd appears among a cameo montage.
X-Men – Nostalgia Critic	36:45	March 6, 2019	An animated Nerd briefly appears during the review intro.
X2: X-Men United – Nostalgia Critic	27:39	March 13, 2019	The intro animation is reused in the Critic's continuing series on the X-Men films.
X-Men – The Last Stand – Nostalgia Critic	32:29	March 20, 2019	The intro animation appears again.
X-Men Origins: Wolverine – Nostalgia Critic	26:30	March 27, 2019	The intro animation appears again.
Justice League – Nostalgia Critic	34:10	November 6, 2019	The Nerd appears, along with Cinema Snob and CinemaSins.
Popeye Kills a Man – Dark Toons	16:53	August 20, 2020	James and Doug review the Popeye short "Happy Birthdaze" as themselves.

=== Cinevore Studios/Mixed Nuts Productions ===
The following collection of videos feature appearances by James Rolfe's character, the Nerd:

Episode name	Length	Release date
Piece of Meat (Cinevore Studios)	3:59	August 12, 2008
Living in 8 Bits No. 50 – The Game Master (Mixed Nuts Productions)	8:54	December 1, 2014
Living in 8 Bits: Super Landscape Bros.	4:48	June 29, 2016
Living in 8 Bits - Super Plumber Odyssey	6:04	August 1, 2021

=== GameTrailers ===
The following collection of videos features appearances by either James Rolfe, or his character The Nerd:

Episode name	Length	Release date	Episode Summary / Notes
Top 10 AVGN Moments of 2009	11:50	February 11, 2010	A look back at the top ten best Angry Video Game Nerd episodes from the 2009 series.
E3 2010: Nintendo Booth Tour	4:15	June 16, 2010	James Rolfe visits E3 2010 for three days as the Nerd, to take a look at a variety of games being previewed, including The Legend of Zelda: Skyward Sword, Kirby's Epic Yarn, Castlevania: Harmony of Despair, Sonic the Hedgehog 4, Back to the Future: The Game, Resident Evil 5, Kid Icarus: Uprising, and Nintendogs + Cats.
E3 2010: Day 2	4:47	June 17, 2010	James Rolfe visits E3 2010 for three days as the Nerd, to take a look at a variety of games being previewed, including The Legend of Zelda: Skyward Sword, Kirby's Epic Yarn, Castlevania: Harmony of Despair, Sonic the Hedgehog 4, Back to the Future: The Game, Resident Evil 5, Kid Icarus: Uprising, and Nintendogs + Cats.
E3 2010: Day 3	5:21	June 18, 2010	James Rolfe visits E3 2010 for three days as the Nerd, to take a look at a variety of games being previewed, including The Legend of Zelda: Skyward Sword, Kirby's Epic Yarn, Castlevania: Harmony of Despair, Sonic the Hedgehog 4, Back to the Future: The Game, Resident Evil 5, Kid Icarus: Uprising, and Nintendogs + Cats.
Pop Fiction Episode 22: Cheetahmen II	11:08	March 24, 2012	The Nerd works with Pop Fiction to tackle a review of Cheetahmen II.
Nerd Memories: Sonic	6:19	March 31, 2012	James Rolfe takes time off from his work on Angry Video Game Nerd, to recount some cherished memories of Sonic the Hedgehog from his classic games.
Nerd Memories: Double Dragon	6:35	May 3, 2012	James Rolfe takes time off from his work on Angry Video Game Nerd, to talk about his memories of playing the Double Dragon series of video games.
Nerd Memories: Mortal Kombat	8:52	July 5, 2012	James Rolfe takes time off from his work on Angry Video Game Nerd, to talk about his childhood memories of the original trilogy games of Mortal Kombat.
Nerd Memories: Killer Instinct	5:59	September 2, 2012	James Rolfe takes time off from his work on Angry Video Game Nerd, to talk about when he saw and played the two games of Killer Instinct as a teenager.
Nerd Memories: Super Mario Kart	4:06	October 4, 2012	James Rolfe takes time off from his work on Angry Video Game Nerd, to remember the day he first played Super Mario Kart for the SNES.

=== Pat the NES Punk ===
The following collection of videos features appearances by either James Rolfe, or his character The Nerd:

Episode name	Length	Release date	Episode Summary / Notes
Golgo 13: Top Secret Episode	1:41	October 14, 2010	The Nerd provides a mini-review of Golgo 13: Top Secret Episode for the Pat the NES Punk's NES Marathon.
Family Game Funness	27:22	August 5, 2011	James Rolfe and Pat Contri play a selection of family-oriented NES games such as Pictionary, Bible Buffet, Family Feud, and MTV's Remote Control.
River City Ransom	2:30	October 22, 2011	The Nerd provides a mini-review of River City Ransom for the 2nd Annual NES Marathon.
Bubble Bobble	4:33	October 21, 2012	The Nerd provides a mini-review of Bubble Bobble for the 3rd Annual NES Marathon.
Sky Kid	3:02	October 20, 2013	The Nerd provides a mini-review of Sky Kid for the 4th Annual NES Marathon.
Bayou Billy/The Punisher – AVGN & Pat the NES Punk	17:34	July 3, 2014	Following an argument between the Nerd and Pat the NES Punk, the pair try to prove the other is wrong – Nerd tries to show that Konami released a few bad games as he reviews The Adventures of Bayou Billy, while Pat proves that LJN released a few passable games by reviewing The Punisher.
Adventure Island	5:37	November 8, 2014	The Nerd provides a mini-review of Adventure Island for the 5th Annual NES Marathon.
Danny Sullivan's Indy Heat	4:55	November 11, 2015	The Nerd provides a mini-review of Danny Sullivan's Indy Heat for the 6th Annual NES Marathon.
The Adventures of Gilligan's Island	6:01	November 13, 2016	The Nerd provides a mini-review of The Adventures of Gilligan's Island for the 7th Annual NES Marathon.
Snoopy's Silly Sports Spectacular	8:51	November 12, 2017	The Nerd provides a mini-review of Snoopy's Silly Sports Spectacular for the 8th Annual NES Marathon.
Pat the NES Punk 10th Anniversary – Bad News Baseball	14:17	July 1, 2018	The Nerd makes a brief cameo.
Angry Video Game Nerd (AVGN) vs Pat the NES Punk in COMBAT!	14:17	November 30, 2019	Pat and the Nerd reunite in a review of Combat.
10th Annual NES Marathon	11:16	December 12, 2020	The Nerd recaps on his past appearances on Pat's annual charity events.
Forgotten NES Games	21:35	October 26, 2023	The Nerd makes a cameo in Pat's 15th Anniversary episode.

=== Other ===
The following collection of videos features appearances by either James Rolfe, or his character The Nerd:

Episode name	Length	Release date	Episode Summary / Notes
A Very Nerdy Non-Canonical Captain S Christmas	15:52	August 1, 2007	The Nerd joins Captain S for Christmas, so he's not alone as they conduct a review of Home Alone for the NES. Notes: Because of the family friendly nature of Captain S, James Rolfe had to tone down the nature of his character for this special episode. In addition, no review is made of Wrath of the Black Manta, despite featuring it in this episode.
Captain S/Angry Video Game Nerd Christmas Special bloopers	4:32	September 5, 2007	A look at the bloopers and outtakes made during production of the special festive, crossover episode of Captain S/Angry Video Game Nerd.
James Rolfe – Meet the Nerd!	3:13	October 29, 2008	GameZombie.tv meet with James Rolfe to interview him about his online work, including his role as The Nerd.
The Roast of the Angry Video Game Nerd	1:12:45	August 2, 2013	James Rolfe takes part in a parody roasting of his work at Too Many Games 2013, as he receives comical critiques from other independent film makers and reviewers.
Game Theory: What's Wrong with the AVGN?	10:24	December 14, 2013	The Nerd receives a psychological analysis in this special episode of Game Theory.
Let's Riff: Super Mario Odyssey w/ Angry Video Game Nerd!	11:29	April 25, 2017	As part of Let's Riff's review of Super Mario Odyssey, James Rolfe takes part, guest starring as The Nerd.
Return to Return to Nuke 'Em High AKA Volume 2	85:00	May 24, 2017	The Nerd makes a brief cameo in this Troma Entertainment production.
#1328 The ANGRY VIDEO GAME NERD films POLYBIUS at TNT Amusements	12:05	October 31, 2017	Owner of TNT Amusements, Todd Tuckey, gives a behind-the-scenes look at the making of the Angry Video Game Nerd episode that reviewed Polybius.
Talking Classics – Aggressive Games	8:29	April 29, 2019	The Nerd makes an appearance on Nathan Barnatt's YouTube channel.
Its a Bargain Bin Christmas - Scott The Woz	24:11	December 23, 2019	James Rolfe narrates the opening scene, presumably as The Nerd.
IRATE GAMER vs AVGN Epic Crossover!	24:31	July 15, 2020	The Nerd co-stars with Chris Bores (in character as Irate Gamer) to re-review Dick Tracy for NES.
Borderline Forever - Scott The Woz	1:03:49	May 23, 2021	In a sequence involving several gaming YouTuber cameos, the Nerd can be seen watching a YouTuber training video made by Scott.
79. Godzilla VS Kong (2021) (Ft. Angry Video Game Nerd) BIGJACKFILMS KING KONG REVIEWS	56:56	December 30, 2021	The Nerd contributes to a review of Godzilla vs. Kong with Big Jack Films.
The BEST Nintendo Switch Games featuring the BEST Nintendo YouTubers!	39:54	January 2, 2022	The Nerd joins an entourage of gaming personalities for the five year anniversary of the Nintendo Switch.
The Real Game Awards	35:37	January 23, 2025	The Nerd makes a special guest appearance on a livestream for Craig Skistimas' (formally of ScrewAttack) Side Scrollers channel.

== Clip Collection videos ==
Episode name	Length	Release date
Top 10 Hardest NES Games	9:18	October 10, 2013
Top 10 Worst Video Game Controls	16:16	November 1, 2013
Top 10 Moments the Nerd Lost His Mind	6:03	November 3, 2013
Top 10 Worst NES Games	7:55	November 7, 2013
Top 10 Most Epic Nerd Moments	22:24	November 10, 2013
Top 20 Weirdest Video Game Moments	12:17	November 15, 2013
Top 5 Worst NES Music	2:20	November 17, 2013
Top 5 Worst Gaming Accessories	6:20	November 24, 2013
Top 10 Worst Video Game Consoles	10:16	November 27, 2013
Top 10 Nerd's Game Abuse	8:53	December 1, 2013
Top 10 Toughest Video Game Jumps	7:47	December 5, 2013
Top 10 Nerd's Unexpected Moments	12:40	December 8, 2013
Top 10 Most Unfair Gaming Moments	5:36	December 13, 2013
Top 10 Worst Video Game Endings	7:31	December 26, 2013
Top 5 Most Ingenious Nerd Ideas	3:41	January 2, 2014
Top 10 Problems with Games	12:33	January 8, 2014
Top 10 Most Hated Weapons or Items	6:50	January 15, 2014
Top 5 Musical Episodes	7:45	January 22, 2014
Top 10 Nerd's Unwanted Guests	15:51	January 29, 2014
Top 10 Cryptic Gaming Moments	10:57	September 16, 2015
Top 5 Nerd's EPIC WINS	6:47	October 14, 2015
Top 5 Nerd's EPIC FAILS	3:29	October 15, 2015
Top 5 Gaming Conspiracies	13:11	November 4, 2015
Top 5 Game Glitches	6:05	December 11, 2015
Top 10 Worst SNES Games the Nerd has Played	7:33	November 12, 2021
Top 10 Game Destructions	9:02	December 17, 2021
Top 10 Weirdest Games	9:01	May 11, 2023
Top 10 Gaming Conspiracies	24:35	June 20, 2023

== Bad Game Cover Art ==
In 2015, from December 1 to 25, a series of mini episodes was released in the style of an advent calendar, in which the Nerd comments on poor examples of video game cover art. The following list these episodes:

Episode name	Length	Release date
Pro Wrestling (SMS)	3:03	December 1, 2015
Mega Man (NES)	2:39	December 2, 2015
Shatterhand (NES)	2:05	December 3, 2015
Action Fighter (SMS)	2:26	December 4, 2015
Shingen the Ruler (NES)	2:13	December 5, 2015
Phalanx (SNES)	1:56	December 6, 2015
Snow White and the 7 Clever Boys (PS2)	1:46	December 7, 2015
Action in New York (NES)	2:43	December 8, 2015
Rallo Gump (DOS)	1:32	December 9, 2015
Ghost Lion (NES)	2:02	December 10, 2015
Eliminator Boat Duel (NES)	2:12	December 11, 2015
Street Hockey '95 (SNES)	1:45	December 12, 2015
Irritating Stick (PS1)	1:47	December 13, 2015
Crackout (NES)	2:00	December 14, 2015
Cock'in (C64)	1:44	December 15, 2015
Treasure Master (NES)	1:53	December 16, 2015
Karnaaj Rally (GBA)	1:42	December 17, 2015
Hell Fighter (NES)	1:43	December 18, 2015
Scrapyard Dog (7800)	1:22	December 19, 2015
Rollerblade Racer (NES)	2:06	December 20, 2015
Killer Kong (ZX Spectrum)	1:39	December 21, 2015
Hammerin' Harry (NES)	1:36	December 22, 2015
Super Duper Sumos (GBA)	1:48	December 23, 2015
The Ultimate Stuntman (NES)	1:59	December 24, 2015
X-Man (2600)	2:40	December 25, 2015

== Shorts ==
YouTube Shorts featuring the Angry Video Game Nerd.

#short name	Length	Release date
ROLLING ROCK on the ROLL 'N ROCKER!!	0:08	February 14, 2023
AVGN VS. CAT IN PING PONG!!	0:08	February 16, 2023
Uncle Fester Rides the Train!	0:17	February 21, 2023
DOOM on Tiger Electronic Handheld	0:25	February 23, 2023
AVGN: A Colecovision Odyssey	0:26	March 1, 2023
NERD FARMS IS FAMILY	0:46	March 3, 2023
AVGN'S B-17 BOMBER!	0:18	March 7, 2023
Bugs Bunny's Birthday Beatdown	0:23	March 10, 2023
BIMMY AND JIMMY?! #AVGN	0:20	March 14, 2023
AVGN ZYURANGER THEME	0:06	March 16, 2023
AVGN Gets Tips From A Ninja!	0:17	March 21, 2023
AVGN Uses Resident Evil's Inventory In REAL LIFE!	0:15	March 23, 2023
AVGN Tries to Land a Ninja on a Boat	0:19	March 28, 2023
AVGN Talks Super Mario Bros. 3	0:18	April 4, 2023
AVGN Uses POWER GLOVE on Top Gun NES	0:25	April 17, 2023
THESE ALIENS WANT THESE COWS BAD!	0:26	May 10, 2023
This Looks Like a Job For Super Nerd!!	0:22	May 31, 2023
AVGN and Raiders of the Lost NES	0:21	June 27, 2023
This is Goonies 2!	0:51	March 5, 2024
A Nerd and His Blob	0:23	March 12, 2024
Final Fantasy 6 Stairs Give The Nerd PTSD	0:22	March 30, 2024
SimCity (SNES)	0:30	July 8, 2024

== Raw Gameplay ==
Compilations of unedited gameplay footage from AVGN episodes with introductions by the Nerd.

#short name	Length	Release date
AVGN TMNT (NES) Raw Gameplay 2006	1:21:38	June 29, 2026
AVGN Back to the Future (NES) raw gameplay 2006	23:05	July 21, 2026
AVGN Top Gun (NES) raw gameplay 2026	29:50	September 15, 2026

== Home releases ==
These DVDs and Blu-rays have not been sold in stores, with the exception of the ScrewAttack store.

DVD name	Release date	Episodes
The Angry Video Game Nerd: Volume 1	November 10, 2007	Disc 1: "Castlevania 2: Simon's Quest", "Dr. Jekyll and Mr. Hyde", "The Karate Kid", "Who Framed Roger Rabbit", "Teenage Mutant Ninja Turtles", "Back to the Future", "McKids", "Wally Bear and the NO! Gang", "Master Chu and the Drunkard Hu", "Top Gun", "Double Dragon 3"; Disc 2: "Friday the 13th", "A Nightmare on Elm Street", "The Power Glove", "Chronologically Confused: Movie/Game Sequels", "Rocky", "Bible Games"
The Angry Video Game Nerd: Volume 2	November 15, 2008	Disc 1: "Teenage Mutant Ninja Turtles 3" (video destruction scene), "Atari 5200", "Ghostbusters" (all three parts), "Spider-Man", "Sega CD", "Sega 32X", "Silver Surfer", "Die Hard", "Independence Day", "The Simpsons"; Disc 2: "Bugs Bunny's Birthday Blowout", "Atari Porn", "Nintendo Power", "Fester's Quest", "Texas Chainsaw Massacre", "Halloween", "Dragon's Lair", "An Angry Video Nerd Christmas Carol" (both parts)
The Angry Video Game Nerd: Volume 3	December 12, 2009	Disc 1: "Chronologically Confused 2: The Legend of Zelda Timeline", "Rambo", "Virtual Boy", "The Wizard of Oz", "DoubleVision" (both parts), "The Wizard & Super Mario Bros. 3" (Super Mario Bros. 3 review only), "NES Accessories", "Indiana Jones Trilogy"; Disc 2: "Star Trek", "Superman", "Superman 64", "Batman" (both parts), "Deadly Towers", "Battletoads", "Dick Tracy", "Dracula", "Frankenstein"; Disc 3: "CD-i Games" (all three parts), "Bible Games 2"
The Angry Video Game Nerd: Volume 4	December 15, 2010	Disc 1: "Michael Jackson's Moonwalker", "Milon's Secret Castle", "Atari Jaguar" (both parts), "Metal Gear", "Odyssey", "X-Men", "Terminator", "Terminator 2: Judgment Day", "Transformers"; Disc 2: "Mario is Missing!", "Plumbers Don't Wear Ties", "Bugs Bunny's Crazy Castle", "Godzilla", "Castlevania" (all four parts), "Wayne's World"; Disc 3: "Super Pitfall!", "Little Red Hood", "Winter Games"
The Angry Video Game Nerd: Volume 5	December 9, 2011	Disc 1: "Street Fighter 2010", "Ninja Gaiden", "Hydlide", "Swordquest", "Pong Consoles", "Action 52", "Cheetahmen", "Game Glitches"; Disc 2: "Zelda II: The Adventure of Link", "Nintendo Days Re-Revisited", "Dr. Jekyll and Mr. Hyde Re-Revisited", "Lester the Unlikely", "How the Nerd Stole Christmas", "Mike's Game Glitches"; Disc 3: Special features
The Angry Video Game Nerd: Volume 6	December 5, 2012	Disc 1: "Day Dreamin' Davey", "Star Wars Games", "R.O.B. the Robot", "Spielberg Games", "Kid Kool", "Nintendo World Championshops 1990", "Dark Castle" (in HD); Disc 2: "Bible Games 3" (in HD), "Schwarzenegger Games" (in HD), "Contra Memories", "Bubble Bobble", "Secret Scout: Aborted AVGN Review" (DVD exclusive), commentaries, You Know What's Bullshit (most episodes, 2007–present); Disc 3: "The Making of an Angry Video Game Nerd Episode: Barbie", plus other features
The Angry Video Game Nerd: Volume 7	December 13, 2013	Disc 1: "Ghosts n' Goblins", "Atari Sports", "Ikari Warriors", "Toxic Crusaders", "Bill & Ted's Excellent Adventure", "Tiger Electronic Games", "Alien 3"; Disc 2: "SNES vs. Genesis Debate", Commentary of the year, Original Nerd Room 2004, Current Nerd Room Tour 2013, Outtakes, Magfest 2013, SGC 2013, TooManyGames 2013; Disc 3: AVGN Countdowns.
The Angry Video Game Nerd: Volume 8	February 2, 2015	Single disc: "AVGN Games!", "Wish List (both parts)", "Big Rigs: Over the Road Racing", "Desert Bus", "Beetlejuice", volume 8 Commentary, Outtakes, Mike: "Game Gear", Mike: "Ghostbusters", SGC Panel 2014, TMG Panel 2014, TMG After Midnight: AVGN 10 Year Anniversary
The Angry Video Game Nerd: Season 9	2016	Disc 1: "Tagin Dragon", "ALF", "CrazyBus", "Ren & Stimpy: Firedogs", "Rocky & Bullwinkle", "Mary-Kate and Ashley: Get a Clue", "V.I.P. with Pamela Anderson", "Lethal Weapon", "Porky's", "HyperScan", "Universal Studios Theme Parks Adventure", "LJN Video Art", "Hong Kong 97", "Darkwing Duck", "Seaman for Dreamcast", "The Crow", "Mortal Kombat Mythologies: Sub-Zero", "Mega Man Games"; Disc 2: Adventure Island, Danny Sulivan, Nerdy Challenges, Season 9 Outtakes, AVGN Script Collection, and Console Setup 2016

Blu-ray name	Release date	Episodes
Angry Video Game Nerd: X Collection	December 11, 2015	Disc 1: Episodes 1–100 (about 19 hours); Disc 2: Bonus Features (about 7 hours)
Angry Video Game Nerd: X2 Collection	March 7, 2017	Disc 1: Episodes 101–114; Disc 2: Bonus Features
Angry Video Game Nerd: X3 Collection	June 26, 2017	Disc 1: Episodes 115–140; Disc 2: Bonus Features
Angry Video Game Nerd: Ready 4 Revenge	November 19, 2017	Single disc: Episodes 141–147 + Bonus Features
Angry Video Game Nerd: BFG Collection	February 18, 2020 (Disc 1-8); November 22, 2021 (Disc 9); April 15, 2024 (Disc 10)	Disc 1/2: Episodes 1–100 + Bonus Features; Disc 3/4: Episodes 101–114 + Bonus Features; Disc 5/6: Episodes 115–140 + Bonus Features; Disc 7: Episodes 141–147 + Bonus Features; Disc 8: Episodes 148–164 + Bonus Features; Disc 9: Episodes 165–187; Disc 10: Episodes 188–206
