= Rosha =

Rosha may refer to:

- Robert S. Harris (programmer) or RoSHa, video game programmer
- Rosha grass (Cymbopogon martinii), a species of grass
