= Nimble Numbers Ned! =

1982 video game

- Developer: North American Philips
- Publisher: North American Philips
- Designer: Bob Harris
- Platform: Magnavox Odyssey²
- Release: NA: September 1982
- Genres: Education, Platform
- Mode: Single-player

Nimble Numbers Ned!, also known as Nimble Numbers N.E.D., is an 1982 educational video game with platforming elements released by North American Philips for the Magnavox Odyssey². It was developed by Bob Harris and released exclusively in North America as a launch title for the Odyssey²'s voice synthesis module, "The Voice". Players guide the player character Ned over a series of numbered stones while avoiding barrels and answering math and geometry questions. It was designed in collaboration with the University of Tennessee, Knoxville for children grades 1-9. Contemporary reviews found it to be a good educational tool but were mixed on the quality of game itself.

== Gameplay ==
Nimble Numbers Ned! is an educational game with platforming elements. There are four different game modes. In the first mode, "Jumping Practice", the player character Ned stands in front of five stones represented by numbers. Ned starts on the left-most stone represented by "0" and must jump to the right-most stone represented by "5". Barrels are being hurled at Ned from the right and must be avoided. In the other modes, the player must complete an educational challenge before each round, in addition to the platforming found in "Jumping Practice". The numbers on the stones also increase each round, reaching a maximum of 100.

In the "Name the Shapes" mode, a number of shapes are shown on screen with one of them flashing. A synthesized voice asks if the flashing shape is one of a handful of included shapes (For example, "is this shape a trapezoid?"). The player uses the keyboard to answer either yes or no. In "Multiplication Runthrough", players are given a series of arithmetic problems aimed at solving a more complicated multiplication problem (For example, the player may be asked to solve 8 × 5 for 40, then 50 × 5 for 250, then finally expected to solve 58 × 5 by adding 40 and 250). In "Function Machine", players are expected to solve elementary algebra problems. A synthesized voice asks the player to determine a mystery number given the result of adding that mystery number to another known number (For example, the voice might say "if the number plus 4 is 20, then what is the number?" and players would be expect to input 16). Players can pick which mode or "drill" they want to do between each round, after "Which drill?" is asked by the voice module. The voice will also taunt players as they are platforming and congratulate them after completing a round.

== Development & release ==
Nimble Numbers Ned! was developed by Robert S. Harris who also developed Killer Bees! for the Odyssey² and War Room for the ColecoVision. Harris was a recent hire for Magnavox, joining the company in late 1981. Harris wasn't pleased with the way the game turned out. According to Harris, his original proposed title was Math Potatoes but marketing choose Nimble Numbers Ned to match with Sid the Spellbinder, another educational Odyssey² game featuring "The Voice".

It was also created in collaboration with the College of Education at University of Tennessee, Knoxville. The word Ned in the title is sometimes presented as an initialism N.E.D., in which case it stands for "Number Education Dialogue". The game was designed to integrate with the Odyssey²'s voice synthesis expansion module, named "The Voice", and was released as a launch title for the expansion in September 1982.

== Reception ==
Reception

Review score
Publication	Score
JoyStik	4/5

The Video Game Update considered Nimble Numbers Ned! to be the best cartridge launched with the Odyssey's "The Voice" module. They praised the game's applicability of the math problems and thought it was a useful product for kids of a variety of ages. Alan R. Bechtold of The Logical Gamer found the math problems to be excellent and called the idea of rewarding kids for correct answers with an action game "brilliant", but found the platforming sections to be too easy and not varied enough to be a good reward. The Logical Gamer's Mike Wilson thought it was a good learning tool and thought the voice synthesis worked well for the questions but called it "just extra noise" during the platforming phase. JoyStik magazine called it "the best use of the Odyssey² keyboard since the famed Master Strategy series of last year" and "the best use of Odyssey's voice module to date." Videogaming and Computer Gaming Illustrated awarded the game second runner-up for "Best Educational Game" in their first annual Vista Awards in 1983.

Electronic Fun with Computers & Games was highly critical, calling the game "neither fun to play nor very educational." They said the voice synthesis "sounds like someone is talking to you from a faulty phone booth in the robot burial ground." Michael Blanchet, writing for Win at Video a syndicated newspaper column, said that it was "guaranteed to confuse" and had trouble understanding the voice lines.
