= Part Time UFO =

2017 video game

- Nintendo Switch game icon
- Developer: HAL Laboratory
- Publishers: HAL Egg (iOS, Android); Nintendo (Nintendo Switch)
- Director: Teruhiko Suzuki
- Producers: Shigefumi Kawase; Yoshiya Taniguchi (Nintendo Switch); Toyokazu Nonaka (Nintendo Switch); Akira Kinashi (Nintendo Switch)
- Designer: Yuta Kawakami
- Programmers: Kaori Ishizaki; Koki Tajima
- Artists: Rieko Kawahara; Tomomi Ozaki
- Composer: Shogo Sakai
- Engine: Cocos2d-x; Unity (Nintendo Switch)
- Platforms: iOS; Android; Nintendo Switch
- Release: iOS, Android: JP: November 14, 2017; WW: February 26, 2018; Nintendo Switch: WW: October 28, 2020
- Genre: Puzzle
- Modes: Single-player, multiplayer

Part Time UFO (Note: Hataraku Yūfō (Japanese: はたらくUFO; Working UFO)) is a 2017 physics-based puzzle video game developed and published by HAL Laboratory. It was first released for iOS and Android in Japan on November 14, 2017, and worldwide on February 26, 2018. An expanded port with new features was released for Nintendo Switch, published by Nintendo, on October 28, 2020.

== Gameplay ==
In Part Time UFO, players control a sentient UFO named Jobski, who resembles a small flying saucer and is equipped with a large claw similar to a UFO catcher. The player can choose between several missions, presented as part-time jobs Jobski can take on. Each job involves using the claw to grab and lift objects, then carrying and placing them into designated areas. These include such tasks as placing a farmer's produce in his truck, organizing cheerleaders into a pyramid, or helping a museum curator reconstruct a dinosaur skeleton. Many puzzles require careful weight distribution when placing objects, as uneven structures will collapse under their own weight and will need to be reconstructed. The weight of an object can also affect Jobski's flight, making it difficult to carry without dropping it or bumping into other objects.

Once all required objects have been placed, the game will test the structure to see if it can stand under its own power for five continuous seconds; if it does not collapse, the job is completed. Each job also has three bonus objectives the player can complete: one for finishing within a time limit, and two additional tasks that vary with each job, such as placing objects in a specific order or adding an optional object to a structure. Upon completing a job, players are scored based on their remaining time and the number of bonus objectives completed, and earn money based on their score. Money can in turn be spent on costumes that alter Jobski's appearance, including one based on Qbby from the BoxBoy! series. Several costumes also give Jobski a special ability that can affect gameplay when worn, such as faster movement speed or the ability to more easily carry heavy objects. Players also earn medals from each bonus objective completed, which are used to unlock new jobs and special costumes that cannot otherwise be purchased.

The Nintendo Switch version of the game adds several new features. In "Treasure Island" mode, players are given a limited time to explore an ancient ruin and retrieve all the treasure contained within. In "Tower of Infinity" mode, players are constantly given new items to stack and must attempt to create the tallest tower possible without letting it collapse. The Switch version also includes three additional jobs, a second more difficult variant for each job, support for two-player cooperative play, and an achievement system called "Feats of Glory" that unlock animated illustrations.

== Development and release ==
On August 21, 2017, HAL Laboratory announced that the company would start developing games for mobile devices under the brand name HAL Egg. Part Time UFO released in Japan on November 14, 2017, and internationally on February 26, 2018. On October 28, 2020, a Nintendo Switch version was announced during a Nintendo Direct presentation, and released the same day. The iOS and Android versions were discontinued, and subsequently delisted from mobile storefronts, on October 22, 2024.

== Reception ==
Reception

Aggregate score
Aggregator	Score
Metacritic	(iOS) 85/100 (NS) 78/100

Review scores
Publication	Score
Destructoid	8/10
Hardcore Gamer	4/5
Nintendo Life	9/10
Nintendo World Report	(iOS) 7.5/10 (NS) 8.5/10
Pocket Gamer	4.5/5
Shacknews	7/10
TouchArcade	5/5

Part Time UFO has been positively received by critics. Shaun Musgrave on TouchArcade stated "from top to bottom, this feels like the same kind of effort HAL would put into one of their games for Nintendo's platforms." CJ Andriessen from Destructoid hoped to see more mobile games similar to Part Time UFO, saying "It's not expensive to make a mobile game, and rather than try to rope players into a long, drawn-out campaign with little innovation or talent required, I'd like to see more inexpensive titles built around a single mechanic that lasts just long enough not to wear out its welcome. You know, games like Part Time UFO." Chris Scullion of Nintendo Life called the game a "must-have", praising its "delightful, addictive" gameplay, humorously detailed levels, and "delightfully twee" soundtrack.
