= The Ultimate Stuntman =

1990 video game

- Box art
- Developer: Codemasters
- Publisher: Camerica
- Composer: Gavin Raeburn
- Platform: NES
- Release: NA: 1990
- Genre: Action
- Mode: Single-player

The Ultimate Stuntman is a 1990 video game developed by Codemasters and published by Camerica for the Nintendo Entertainment System (NES), featuring action game elements. The Ultimate Stuntman is one of 14 video games published by Camerica for the NES without proper licensing. The company had to create their own cartridges that would bypass Nintendo's lock-out chip and break the 10NES "code". Another unusual aspect of Camerica games released for the NES is their distinctive color cartridges. The Ultimate Stuntman, like all Codemasters games, was released as a gold cartridge in the U.S. and a black cartridge in Europe.

== Gameplay ==
The player is Ultimate Stuntman, a rogue mercenary who is called into duty when Jenny Aykroyd is suddenly kidnapped by Dr. Evil. Following in the footsteps of side-scrolling action games such as the Contra and Mega Man series, The Ultimate Stuntman gives the player access to a variety of levels with different concepts. A basic recurring theme in the game is the concept of three levels, a boss fight, and then a "bomb disposal". In most cases, the first level in the sequence involves Stuntman chasing down Dr. Evil in some form of vehicle such as a car, hang glider, dune buggy, etc. The second series of levels has Stuntman fighting evil on foot with the help of a firearm.

The third series of levels uses a concept where the player controls Stuntman who needs to climb a structure, similar to Crazy Climber's gameplay, but at the same time, the player acts as a sniper in Stuntman's aid by shooting down objects and creatures that threaten him while he ascends. During these levels, only one action can be conducted at any given time (i.e. the player can move Stuntman, or snipe enemies on his behalf). Once a Boss has been defeated, the player is confronted with the daunting task of disposing a bomb before the fuse has been entirely burnt. The player must use the directional pad to move the cursor from block to block keeping an eye on the number on each one. Every time the cursor moves to a certain block, the number on it decreases by one. This creates a puzzle-like scenario, where if the player makes a mistake they must reset the disposal and try again with less time. One cannot advance in the game without completing the bomb disposal in the given time.
