= Killer Kong =

1983 video game

- Developer: Gary Capewell
- Publisher: Blaby Computer Games
- Platform: ZX Spectrum
- Release: 1983
- Genre: Platform

Killer Kong is a clone of Donkey Kong written for the ZX Spectrum by Gary Capewell and published by Blaby Computer Games in 1983.

== Reception ==
Screenshot

Crash magazine called Killer Kong "a very fine version with excellent graphics and plenty of screen variation."

In 2011, retrogaming magazine ZX Spectrum Gamer wrote, "Killer Kong might actually be pretty good if it didn't play like a magazine type-in. The movement is really jerky–character square movement instead of pixel precision, and the barrels tend to flicker enough to make things really tricky".
