= War Room (video game) =

1983 video game

- Developer: North American Philips Consumer Electronics
- Publisher: Probe 2000
- Designer: Robert S. Harris
- Platform: ColecoVision
- Release: 1983
- Genre: Shoot 'em up
- Mode: Single-player

War Room is a video game written by Robert S. Harris for the ColecoVision and published by Probe 2000 in 1983. The player takes the role of a four-star general defending the United States from a nuclear attack.

== Development ==
Probe 2000 was North American Phillips' attempt to broaden their reach in the video game market. They had previously released the Odyssey series of consoles and the Odyssey² was their current system. They created the Probe 2000 brand in order to publish titles for competitors' systems. Ultimately, production issues and the video game crash of 1983 caused Philips to abandon the effort and discontinue their video game operations completely. While four titles are known to have been completed only War Room was released. Harris, the programmer of War Room, also programed games for Phillips' Odyssey²; Nimble Numbers Ned! and Killer Bees!

== Reception ==
Tracie Forman of Electronic Games wrote, "It takes the concept introduced in Missile Command a giant step further," and called War Room "one of the most addictive, exhilarating games for the ColecoVision." In 2014, Retro Gamer included War Room in their Top Ten ColecoVision Games list.
