= Killer Bees! =

1983 action video game

- North American box art
- Developer: Odyssey Software Development Group
- Publishers: NA: North American Philips; PAL: Philips N.V.
- Designer: Robert Harris
- Platforms: Odyssey²/Videopac; Philips Videopac+
- Release: Odyssey²: NA: April 1983; PAL: 1983; Videopac+: PAL: 1983
- Genre: Action
- Mode: Single-player

Killer Bees! is a 1983 action video game by Robert Harris for the Magnavox Odyssey², known in Europe as the Philips Videopac G7000. Players take on the role of a swarm of bees who must sting five robots to death while avoiding swarms of enemy bees. It was developed by the Odyssey Software Development Group, a division of North American Philips (N.A.P.). In Europe, it was also released for the Philips Videopac+ G7400. The North American version the game is compatible with "The Voice of Odyssey²", an expansion module that adds synthesized voice lines. It is one of the last games released for the Odyssey².

Harris, also known as Bob Harris or RoSHa, created the game as his second project at N.A.P. after Nimble Numbers Ned!. It was also his second and final Odyssey² game. Harris found inspiration after hearing a voice line that resembled the sound of bees buzzing. He was also inspired by Centipede and the scoring systems in pinball machines. He described difficulty programming for the Odyssey² and thought the system lacked the flexibility of the Atari 2600. Multiple features were the result of experimentation with the hardware in an attempt to expand its capabilities.

It was highly praised by a variety of different publications for its originality, addictiveness, and smooth difficulty progression. Some critics thought the graphics were too sparse. Others thought they were a mark above those from other Odyssey² games. Many also praised its sound. It is recognized by several reviewers as one of the must-own games for the system.

== Gameplay ==
Killer Bees! is an action game in which the player takes on the role of a swarm of bees. The goal of each round is to sting all five of the robots known as Beebots that wander the stage until each one turns into a gravestone. Also wandering the arena are enemy bee swarms which spawn over time from portals on all sides of the arena. If the player comes into contact with one of these swarms, they lose some of their bees until all twelve bees from their swarm are gone and the game ends. The player swarm has access to the bug zapper, a laser beam that covers a horizontal stripe of the screen and destroys any enemy swarm in its path. The bug zapper can only be used once but recharges every time a Beebot gets stung to death.

Beebots move slower the more they are stung but also get faster as the round progresses. Beebots also get faster with each progressive round. Players earn points according to how many bees they managed to keep alive by the end of a round. A point multiplier is also added every time the player completes a round without losing any bees. There are 26 rounds in total.

Typical gameplay with Beebots in red and blue, enemy swarms in green, and the player in white

== Development ==
Killer Bees! was designed and programmed by Robert S. Harris, also known as Bob Harris or RoSHa. Harris was a former Milton Bradley employee. He was hired by the North American Philips Consumer Electronics Company (N.A.P.C.E.C.), formerly known as Magnavox, in 1981 along with fellow Milton Bradley employee and returning Odyssey² programmer, Sam Overton. He became part of a team dedicated to developing Odyssey² games known as the Odyssey Software Development Group or Odyssey West. Although other Odyssey West programmers helped test the game, Harris ultimately had full creative control over the project. It was his second Odyssey² game following Nimble Numbers Ned!

The game includes a voice synthesis feature compatible with "The Voice of Odyssey²" expansion module. Harris was inspired to create Killer Bees! after hearing one of the included sounds, intended to be a cartoon spring sound. Harris thought it sounded more like bees buzzing. It was included in the game at the start of each round. Harris also says he was heavily inspired by Atari's Centipede during development and wanted to mimic the way players could manipulate the centipede's behavior. He attempted to implement this by having the Beebots move in highly predictable ways in the hope that player strategy would evolve around trapping Beebots in tight loops. Aspects of the scoring system were inspired by pinball, notably how scoring multipliers increase the more rounds the player performs without taking damage.

Harris described programming for the Odyssey² as "difficult" and thought the system's CPU, the Intel 8048, was a poor choice for a game console. He also believed the graphics chip in the system was more complicated but less flexible than the Television Interface Adaptor in the Atari 2600. He said "the chip did more for you, but it could only do those things it was designed for, and nothing more." Harris and other Odyssey West programmers experimented with bugs and other unintended features that might have allowed them to overcome some of these graphical limitations. This included drawing the same graphical element twice in different parts of the screen by moving graphics data around in the middle of frame. Harris also tried displaying certain graphical elements only on alternating frames (which would have allowed more Beebots to fit on screen but also would have produced a noticeable flicker). This was ultimately discarded for being too resource intensive. The Beebots were constructed from bottom halves of two different characters of the Odyssey²'s built-in character set, the legs from a character of a man walking and the head from the bottom of the arabic numeral 8.

Harris also included a unique title screen for the game which displays the game's title, as opposed to the "Select Game" menu which appears at the beginning of most Odyssey² games. For that screen, he programmed the background color to change on specific scanlines producing a moving rainbow effect. A similar tehcnique was used to implement the bug zapper beam. Harris said it was "an experiment to see if we could do anything useful like that. The answer was generally 'no,' but that effect was attractive enough to put in the cartridge."

Some gameplay suggestion were provided by other Odyssey West staff. The portals that enemies spawn from were a suggestion of Rex Battenbourg, who complained about enemies arriving on screen with too little warning. Sam Overton provided the idea for the bug zapper. Mike Staup, then vice president, suggested the "heart beat" sound effect that plays when no other sound effect is occurring, not unlike the background noise in Pac-Man. Staup insisted that the repetitive sound was a large part of Pac-Man's success.

== Release & reception ==
=== Release ===
Killer Bees! launched in North America in April 1983. Soon after, N.A.P. announced they were pulling development focus away from the Odyssey². Harris' made one last game for N.A.P., War Room, which released for the ColecoVision. Killer Bees! was also released in Europe for the Philips Videopac G7000. A version for the Philips Videopac+ G7400 was also released which featured an enhanced background with a honey comb pattern and images of cartoon bees and bee hives.

=== Reception ===
Games magazine considered the opportunity to play the game to be "good news for Odyssey² owners", claiming it was "one of the most addictive one-player games we've played on any system." In Electronic Fun with Computers & Games, Art Levis called the game "stinging good fun" and bemoaned how few people would get to play a game with "great play value", "great sound effects", and a lack of common cliches. Michael Blanchet, in his syndicated newspaper column Win at Video, said the game was "nothing new" but added that it was "one of the best action games" available for the Odyssey². He saw the graphics as a marked improvement over previous Odyssey² games. E.C. Meade and Jim Clarke writing for Videogaming and Computer Gaming Illustrated thought the graphics were "about as sparse as you can get" but called the gameplay "excellent". They went on to say it was "fun, fast, highly original, and sporting excellent buzzing and voice effects."

The Video Game Update thought it was "very simple" and criticized the lack of alternate modes, considering it great for kids but skeptical about its appeal to adults. Eleven year old published author of The Kid Vid's Book of Home Video Games, Rawson Stovall, thought the game was very hard with mediocre gameplay and graphics, though he did like the sound effects. Alan R. Bechtold of The Logical Gamer criticized it for ending too quickly and thought it was too difficult to tell the player's swarm apart from the enemies but thought the graphics were an "interesting departure for [Philips]." He also found the game to be very addicting, but thought there were better Odyssey² alternatives, such as K.C. Munchkin or UFO!. Fellow The Logical Gamer reviewer Mike Wilson said it was a "very fine game" and "a refreshing new challenge" with "some of the best graphics [Philips] has turned out."

French magazine Tilt complimented the games opening attract mode and thought the game was great fun, not as easy as it looks, but a bit repetitive. German magazine Telematch called it one of Philips' best action games and gave it the second best possible score. Italian magazine Videogiochi thought it was one of the best games ever made for the Videopac. Brett Weiss in 2007 called the game "highly inventive". He complemented the difficulty progression calling it "smooth as honey" and thought the graphics were an "unusual look for the system." Videogames Hardware Handbook written by Retrogamer staff called Killer Bees! an essential game for the Videopac G7000, praising the "imaginative, deep, and involving gameplay."
