= Werewolf: The Last Warrior =

1990 video game

- Cover art used in North America and Europe
- Developer: Data East/SAS Sakata
- Publishers: Data East (NA/EU); Takara (Japan)
- Director: Ken Fukaki
- Programmers: Motohiro Umeki; H. Itoh
- Artists: T. Watanabe; Eiichiro Nakatsu
- Composers: Shogo Sakai; Takafumi Miura; Yusuke Takahama
- Platform: Nintendo Entertainment System
- Release: NA: December 1990; JP: June 28, 1991; EU: September 26, 1991
- Genre: Platform game
- Mode: Single-player

Werewolf: The Last Warrior (Note: Japanese: 超人狼戦記WARWOLFウォーウルフ, Hepburn: Chō Jinrō Senki Wōurufu; lit. 'Super Werewolf Chronicles Warwolf') is a platform game for the Nintendo Entertainment System. The game was released in November 1990 in North America. It starred a werewolf character named Warwolf.

== Story ==
The game takes place on "Red Earth"—Earth's second colony planet. Dr. Faryan ventured into a cave and awoke an ancient evil force that made him turn into an evil entity. Afterwards, Dr. Faryan created an army of evil mutants who imprisoned nearly everyone on Earth. The only hope for humanity is a man named Ken, the last of a tribe of changelings who has the ability to transform into a werewolf named "Warwolf".

== Gameplay ==
Getting red "W"s will allow Ken to turn into a werewolf, granting him a longer-range melee attack, and a wall-climbing ability. Getting blue "W"s, while in werewolf form will make Ken turn back into a man. Getting bubbles will fill his anger meter and getting five of them will turn him into a super werewolf that can jump higher and do double damage for a limited time.

== Reception ==
Reception

Review scores
Publication	Score
Electronic Gaming Monthly	7/10, 7/10, 6/10, 8/10
Famitsu	4/10, 6/10, 7/10, 4/10
VideoGames & Computer Entertainment	6/10

GamePro Magazine gave a favourable review to the game, calling it "challenging" and with "slick" cutscenes between stages, but criticized the "basic storyline" and average graphics.

Magazine VideoGames & Computer Entertainment gave a negative review, criticizing it as a short, tough, "simple and uninspired" game, but praised the graphics and level backgrounds. It noted to be design flaws the "clumsy controls", which were an inverted control scheme from the usual NES interface ("B" to jump and "A" to fire), and the need to let the timer run out after the player character loses his werewolf transformation.

Seanbaby, in an editorial column in Electronic Gaming Monthly, listed Werewolf: The Last Warrior in his "Worst 7s", games that he considered to have been, in hindsight, unjustly rewarded with positive notes by previous issues of the magazine.
