= Melvin Purvis: G-Man =

1974 biographical television film

- Genre: Action; Biography; Crime; Drama
- Created by: John Milius
- Written by: John Milius; William F Nolan
- Story by: John Milius
- Directed by: Dan Curtis
- Starring: Dale Robertson; Harris Yulin; David Canary; Steve Kanaly; Matt Clark; Elliott Street; John Karlen; Woodrow Parfrey; Margaret Blye; Dick Sargent
- Theme music composer: Bob Cobert
- Country of origin: United States
- Original language: English

Production
- Executive producer: Paul R. Picard
- Producer: Dan Curtis
- Production locations: Lockeford, California; Nicolaus, Michigan Bar and Sloughhouse, California
- Cinematography: Jacques R. Marquette
- Editors: Corky Ehlers; Richard A. Harris
- Running time: 74 minutes
- Production companies: American International Pictures; Dan Curtis Productions

Original release
- Network: ABC
- Release: April 9, 1974

Related
- Dillinger; The Kansas City Massacre

Melvin Purvis: G-Man is a 1974 American TV movie about Melvin Purvis. It is a spin-off of Dillinger (directed by John Milius, co-author of the teleplay for this movie) and was followed in 1975 by The Kansas City Massacre, also directed by Dan Curtis and starring Dale Robertson as Purvis.

== Plot ==
In this largely fictionalized film, agent Melvin Purvis is placed in charge of running down notorious killer Machine Gun Kelly and sets out to do just that. The film script is loosely based on Kelly's actual 1933 kidnapping of Charles F. Urschel, an Oklahoma petroleum executive, but the names and locations are changed. However, the film does accurately depict Kelly as a weak man who is dominated by his ambitious wife Katherine Kelly.

== Cast ==
- Dale Robertson as FBI Agent Melvin Purvis
- Harris Yulin as George "Machine Gun" Kelly
- Dick Sargent as Thatcher Covington
- Margaret Blye as Katherine Ryan-Kelly
- David Canary as Eugene T. Farber
- Matt Clark as Charles "Charlie" Parlmetter
- Steve Kanaly as FBI Agent Sam Cowley
- Elliott Street as Thomas "Buckwheat" Longacre
- John Karlen as Antonio "Tony" Redecci
- Woodrow Parfrey as Nash Covington
- Don Megowan as Hamburger Stand Man
- Eddie Quillan as Hotel Clerk

== Production ==
In January 1974, there were reports Ben Johnson would reprise his role as Melvin Purvis from the film Dillinger in an ABC Movie of the Week called Purvis, which would act as a pilot for a potential series. Eventually the role was taken by Dale Robertson and Dan Curtis was the show runner. It was American International Pictures' first proper venture into TV production.

Filming was done in Nicolaus, Michigan Bar and Sloughhouse in California.

In a 1976 interview, John Milius called Dan Curtis "this asshole director." He also didn't like working for TV. "I don't like the way the networks screw around with you. The pay isn't the thing that turns me off; I'm not out to get the most money. You slave and toil over the thing and then they cut this out, cut that out, change this, for some damn reason. I won't tolerate that. I don't work hard on something to have it bowdlerized that way."

== Reception ==
The Los Angeles Times thought the pilot was superior to Dillinger "because here character and motivation are made to count much more than mere violence."

It was the second highest rating program of the week. It led to another TV movie The Kansas City Massacre (1975) though no series.

== Release ==
The film was released cinematically outside the USA, but since Machine Gun Kelly was better known than Melvin Purvis, promotion emphasized Kelly, and the film was renamed under titles mentioning Kelly. One title was The Legend of Machine Gun Kelly.
