= Terminator 2D: No Fate =

2025 video game

- Developer: Bitmap Bureau
- Publisher: Reef Entertainment
- Designer: Mike Tucker
- Programmer: Mike Tucker
- Composer: Featurecast
- Series: Terminator
- Platforms: Nintendo Switch; PlayStation 4; PlayStation 5; Windows; Xbox One; Xbox Series X/S
- Release: December 12, 2025
- Genre: Action
- Mode: Single-player

Terminator 2D: No Fate is an action video game developed by Bitmap Bureau and published by Reef Entertainment for Nintendo Switch, PlayStation 4, PlayStation 5, Windows, Xbox One, and Xbox Series X/S. The game takes place during events of the movie, Terminator 2: Judgment Day. The game was released on December 12, 2025.

== Gameplay ==
According to lead programmer and designer Mike Tucker, the game begins by revisiting the events of Terminator 2: Judgment Day, as a 2D side-scrolling game. The "No Fate" feature is activated on subsequent playthroughs, where the player can make different choices that can unlock new scenarios, secret levels, and remixed weapon loadouts. For instance, a player's choice during Sarah Connor's infiltration of Cyberdyne HQ could see her fighting with a pistol and punches, or going "guns blazing" with an assault rifle alongside the T-800's minigun in another. This feature aims to respect the original movie's plot while also offering new experiences.

== Story ==
In 1994, Sarah Connor trains her son John in preparation for his future role as the human Resistance leader. The training is interrupted when a group of thieves raid their training ground in Texas and kidnap John. After killing the thieves, Sarah evacuates John to a nearby safehouse and raids a Cyberdyne Systems lab in San Francisco, heavily damaging the facility. Upon seeing the first prototype terminator, Sarah is arrested by local police, and Cyberdyne has her committed to Pescadero State Hospital in Los Angeles. These events eventually trigger one possible future where humanity enters a war with Skynet, with an adult John taking part in gathering intelligence on Skynet's Time Displacement Equipment in order to facilitate Skynet's destruction in 2029.

In 1995, the T-1000 and a resistance-affiliated T-800 terminator are sent to intercept John, with John being rescued by the T-800. John and the T-800 rescue an escaping Sarah, and the story diverges into one of three paths depending on two key decisions the player makes in the game.

=== Resetting the T-800's chip and sparing Miles Dyson ===
The events play closely to the events of the film. Sarah arms explosives to destroy the L.A. Cyberdyne building, and the Connors recover the 1984 Terminator's remains thanks to Dyson's initial survival, but the latter is mortally wounded by L.A.P.D. S.W.A.T. during their escape. Shortly after destroying the T-1000 in the steel mill, the T-800 sacrifices himself to prevent his technology from being used for research. The story ends when John destroys Skynet's last remnants of security in 2029 and reprograms a T-800 to protect his younger self in 1995.

=== The T-800 kills Dyson ===
Believing Dyson to be a threat, Sarah orders the T-800 to assassinate Dyson, and in the aftermath, Sarah is briefly arrested by the L.A.P.D. for murder before breaking out with the T-800's help. Sarah arms the explosives to destroy the Cyberdyne building, but the group is unable to retrieve the 1984 Terminator's remains, forcing the T-800 to clear a path for the Connors' escape. Shortly after destroying the T-1000 in the steel mill, John runs away from Sarah in disgust for her role in ordering Dyson's death, and Judgment Day comes to pass. By 2029, John is captured by Skynet, forcing an elderly Sarah to free him from captivity with the T-800's aid. She volunteers herself into raiding Skynet's Time Displacement Equipment facility in order to reconcile with him. The game ends with both Connors reprogramming the T-800 for the time travel mission to 1995, reconciling with each other as they focus on rebuilding civilization.

=== Sarah kills Dyson and the T-800's chip is reset ===
The story plays out the same as the T-800 killing Dyson, except the T-800 sacrifices himself after the T-1000's destruction. However, as Sarah attempts to rescue John, an enemy terminator Sarah defeats had enough strength to kill John during her rescue mission due to the T-800 not being present to save him. Sarah notes that the human resistance is barely holding on in their war against Skynet, stating that humanity is doomed.

== Release ==
The game was originally scheduled to be released on October 31, 2025, but was delayed due to "ongoing global trade and tariff changes that delayed shipment of the components for [the] Day One and Collector's Editions." The game was then set to be released on November 25, 2025 but was delayed again to give the publisher time to complete physical editions of the game. The game was ultimately released on December 12, 2025.

== Reception ==
Reception

Aggregate score
Aggregator	Score
OpenCritic	54% recommend (Note: Based on 56 reviews)

The trailer has received positive reviews, calling it a "love letter" to the Terminator franchise.

Giant Bomb's Dan Ryckert gave the game two and a half stars out of five, praising the fan service and variety of gameplay styles, but criticized its short length compared to the recommended retail price of the game. Eurogamer reviews the game a stylish, nostalgic action platformer that’s fun but very short. Luke Reilly from IGN praised the game as a "wonderfully realized tribute" to the film with "pitch-perfect music, exquisite pixel art, and brilliant Easter eggs" but also noted its brief length. In contrast, Rick Lane from The Guardian felt that the parts of the game that followed the film felt constrained and weren't fun to play, but found the original levels more interesting.
