= Dale Robertson =

American actor (1923–2013)

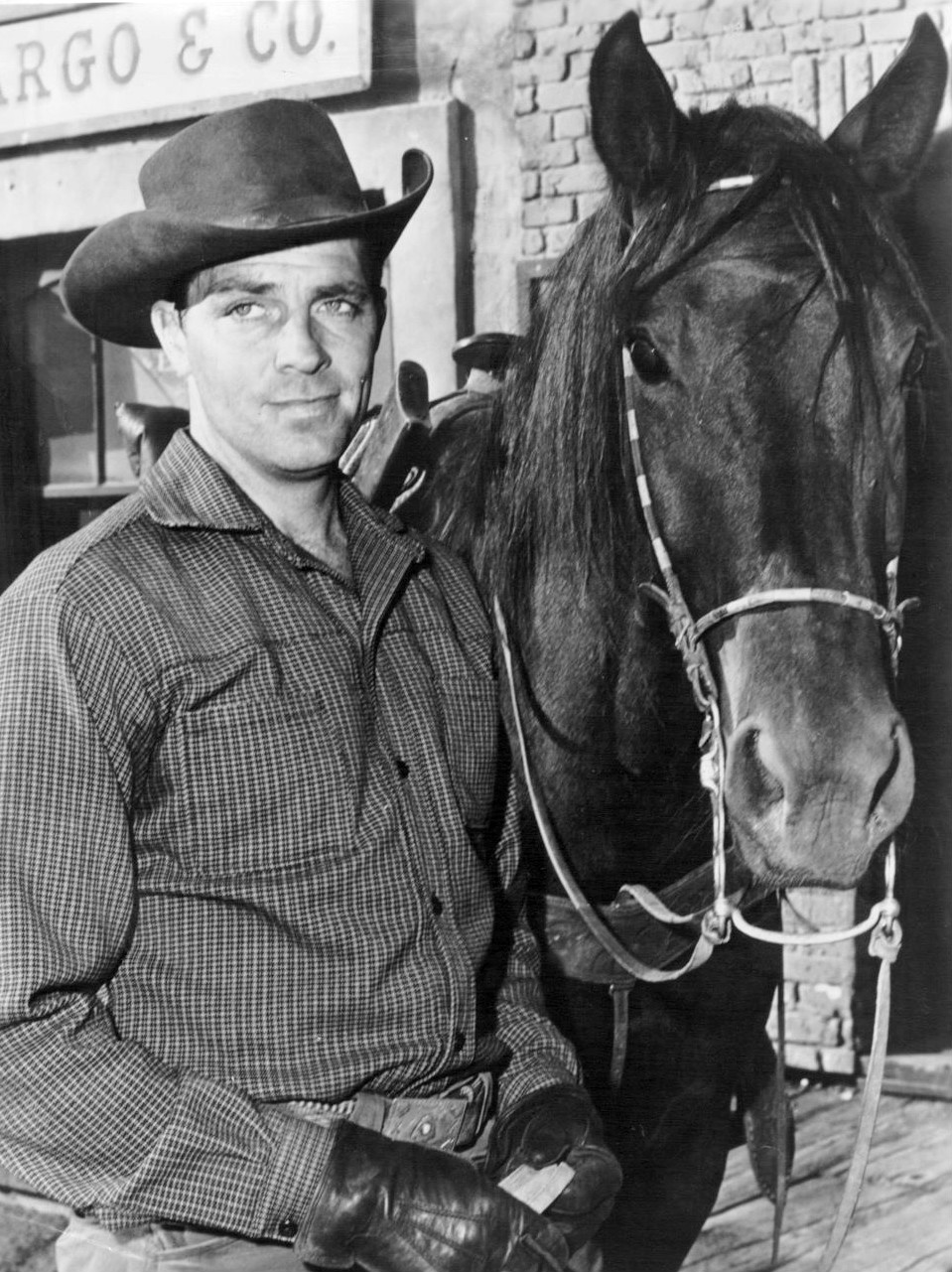
- Robertson as Jim Hardie, 1958
- Born: Dayle Lymoine Robertson; July 14, 1923; Harrah, Oklahoma, U.S.
- Died: February 27, 2013 (aged 89); La Jolla, California, U.S.
- Occupation: Actor
- Years active: 1948–1994
- Spouse(s): Frederica Jacqueline Wilson (1951–1956; divorced); 1 daughter Mary Murphy (1956–1956; annulled); Lula Mae Robertson (m. 1959–1977); two daughters Susan Robbins Robertson (married 1980–2013; his death)
- Children: 3

Dayle Lymoine Robertson (July 14, 1923 – February 26, 2013) was an American actor best known for his starring roles on television. He played the roving investigator Jim Hardie in the television series Tales of Wells Fargo and railroad owner Ben Calhoun in Iron Horse. He often was presented as a deceptively thoughtful and modest Western hero. From 1968 to 1970, Robertson was the fourth and final host of the anthology series Death Valley Days. Described by Time magazine in 1959 as "probably the best horseman on television", for most of his career, Robertson played in Western films and television shows—well over 60 titles in all.

== Early life ==
Born in 1923 to Melvin and Vervel Robertson in Harrah, Oklahoma, Robertson fought as a professional boxer while enrolled in the Oklahoma Military Academy in Claremore.

During this time Columbia Pictures offered to test Robertson for the lead in their film version of Golden Boy, but Robertson turned down the trip to Hollywood for a screen test. He did not want to leave the ponies he was training, nor his home, and the role went to William Holden.

In a 1987 appearance on The Tonight Show Starring Johnny Carson, Robertson said he was of Cherokee ancestry. He joked, "I am the tribe's West Coast distributor."

=== World War II ===
During World War II, he was commissioned through Officer Candidate School, and served in the U.S. Army's 322nd Combat Engineer Battalion of the 97th Infantry Division in Europe. He was wounded twice and was awarded the Bronze and Silver Star medals.

== Career ==
=== Early roles ===
Robertson began his acting career by chance when he was in the army. When he was stationed at San Luis Obispo, California, Robertson's mother asked him to have a portrait taken for her because she did not have one; so he and several other soldiers went to Hollywood to find a photographer. A large copy of his photo was displayed in his mother's living room window. He found himself receiving letters from film agents who wished to represent him. After the war, Robertson's war wounds prevented him from resuming his boxing career. He stayed in California to try his hand at acting. Hollywood actor Will Rogers Jr., gave him this advice: "Don't ever take a dramatic lesson. They will try to put your voice in a dinner jacket, and people like their hominy and grits in everyday clothes." Robertson thereafter avoided formal acting lessons.

Robertson made his film debut in an uncredited role as a policeman in The Boy with Green Hair (1948). Two other uncredited appearances led to featured roles in two Randolph Scott Westerns: Fighting Man of the Plains (1949), where he played Jesse James, and The Cariboo Trail (1950).

Popular acclaim to Robertson's brief roles led him to be signed to a seven-year contract to 20th Century Fox. Robertson's first role for Fox was a support part in a Western, Two Flags West (1951). He had a support part in the musical Call Me Mister (1951). He soon advanced to leading roles in films such as Take Care of My Little Girl (1951), where he played Jeanne Crain's love interest, and Golden Girl (1951), where he supported Mitzi Gaynor.

=== Stardom ===
Fox gave Robertson top billing in Return of the Texan (1952). He appeared opposite Anne Baxter in The Outcasts of Poker Flat (1952), and starred in the historical adventure Lydia Bailey (1952).

Robertson was never very cooperative with the press, even shunning the powerful columnist Louella Parsons. As a result, he won the press' Sour Apple Award for three years running. But then, commented Robertson, "that dang Sinatra had to hit some photographer in the nose and stop me from getting my fourth."

He was one of several Fox names in O. Henry's Full House (1952) and was Betty Grable's love interest in The Farmer Takes a Wife (1953).

RKO borrowed him for Devil's Canyon (1953) with Virginia Mayo and Son of Sinbad, filmed in 1953 but not released for two more years.

He returned to Fox for City of Bad Men (1953) with Crain; The Silver Whip (1954) with Rory Calhoun and Robert Wagner; and The Gambler from Natchez (1954) with Debra Paget.

=== Freelancer ===
Robertson went over to United Artists to star in Sitting Bull (1954), and Top of the World (1955), an adventure film.

Robertson did A Day of Fury (1956) for Universal and Dakota Incident (1956) for Republic, then traveled to Britain for High Terrace (1956).

=== Television ===
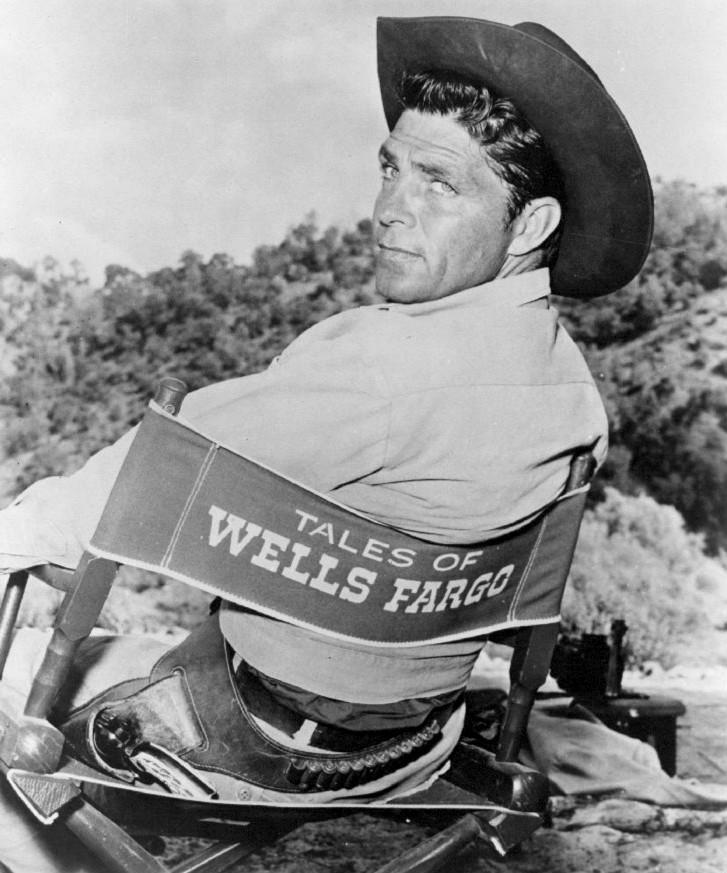
Dale Robertson 1959

Tales of Wells Fargo, his best-remembered series, aired on NBC from 1957 to 1962. Weekly black-and-white episodes were 30 minutes in length from 1957-1961. The program expanded to an hour and switched to color for its final season in 1961-1962. The show originally was produced by Nat Holt, to whom Robertson felt he owed his career for giving him his first leading roles. Robertson used his own horse, Jubilee, throughout the run of the series.

Robertson also did the narration for Tales of Wells Fargo through which he often presented his own commentary on matters of law, morality, and common sense. He was unique among his television contemporaries, stating that he hated the gun he was forced to carry, but saw it as a necessary evil, a "tool of the trade", and kept practicing.

In its cover story on television Westerns, published March 30, 1959, Time reported Robertson was 6 feet tall, weighed 180 pounds, and measured 42–34–34. He sometimes made use of his physique in "beefcake" scenes, such as one in 1952's Return of the Texan where he is seen bare-chested and sweaty, repairing a fence.

In 1960, Robertson guest-starred as himself in NBC's The Ford Show, starring Tennessee Ernie Ford. In 1962, he similarly appeared and sang a perfect rendition of "High Noon" on the short-lived Western comedy and variety series The Roy Rogers and Dale Evans Show.

=== 1960s work ===
After Tales of Wells Fargo ended its five-year run in 1962, he played the lead role in the first of A. C. Lyles' Law of the Lawless in 1963. The film was initially set to star Rory Calhoun, but Calhoun came down with pneumonia the night before the production was set to start filming. Robertson stepped in at six hours' notice. Lyles had acquired the friendship and respect of a galaxy of experienced actors who offered their services to his production.

Robertson filmed a television pilot about Diamond Jim Brady that was ultimately not picked up as a series. It did air as a TV movie, Diamond Jim: Skulduggery in Samantha, in 1965.

Robertson created United Screen Arts in 1965 which released two of his films: The Man from Button Willow, a 1965 animated film where he voiced the main character (also reuniting with Tales of Wells Fargo guest stars Edgar Buchanan, Edward Platt, and Howard Keel), and The One Eyed Soldiers, a 1966 crime film shot in Yugoslavia.

In the 1966–67 season, Robertson starred in another television pilot called Scalplock, which was picked up as a series and released as a TV movie: Iron Horse, in which his character Benjamin Calhoun wins an incomplete railroad line in a poker game and then decides to manage the company. The series ran for 48 episodes from 1966 to 1968.

In October 1968, he succeeded Robert Taylor as the host of Death Valley Days, a role formerly held by Stanley Andrews and future U.S. President Ronald Reagan. The series would come to its end, after 19 years on the air, with Robertson's full season of 26 episodes as host. In rebroadcasts, Death Valley Days (often known as Trails West at the time), featured Ray Milland in the role of revised host.

Robertson guest-starred on the November 17, 1969, episode of The Dean Martin Show.

=== Later career ===
In 1970 he had the lead playing a US Army Major in the Japanese film Aru heishi no kake.

Robertson guest-starred as himself in the episode "Little Orphan Airplane" of The Six Million Dollar Man in 1974.

He portrayed legendary FBI agent Melvin Purvis in two made-for-television movies Melvin Purvis: G-Man (1974) and The Kansas City Massacre (1975).

In 1981, Robertson was in the original starring cast of Dynasty, playing Walter Lankershim, a character who disappeared after the first season. Robertson also played Frank Crutcher in five episodes of the TV series Dallas during the 1982–83 season.

In 1983, Robertson made Big John, another television pilot, where he played a Georgia sheriff who becomes a New York Police Department detective. From 1987 to 1988, he starred as the title character the detective series J.J. Starbuck.

Robertson played a central part in a two-part episode of Murder, She Wrote with Angela Lansbury. He was not credited in either appearance because he took issue with the show's protocol of naming all guest stars alphabetically with no exception. When the show's producers would not waver on this subject, he asked not to be credited.

In December 1993 and January 1994, Robertson appeared in three episodes of Harts of the West in the role of Zeke Terrell, which would be the final credited roles of his career.

He received the Golden Boot Award in 1985, has a star on the Hollywood Walk of Fame, and is also in the Hall of Great Western Performers and the National Cowboy & Western Heritage Museum in Oklahoma City.

In 1999, Robertson won the award for film and television from the American Cowboy Culture Association in Lubbock, Texas.

In the last few years before his death, Robertson hosted a radio program called Little Known Facts, which was broadcast on 400 radio stations.

During the 27th Annual Texas Trail of Fame Awards held October 24, 2024, Robertson was awarded a bronze star on the walkway located in the Stockyards at Fort Worth, Texas.

== Death ==
In his later years, Robertson and his wife, Susan Robbins, whom he married in 1980, lived on his ranch in Yukon, Oklahoma, where it was reported he owned 235 horses at one time, with five mares foaling grand champions. Due to his declining health, he relocated to the San Diego area in what would be his final months, dying at Scripps Memorial Hospital in La Jolla, California, on February 26, 2013, from lung cancer and pneumonia.

== TV and filmography ==
- The Boy with Green Hair (1948) – Cop (uncredited)
- Flamingo Road (1948) – Tunis Simms (uncredited)
- The Girl from Jones Beach (1949) – Lifeguard (uncredited)
- Fighting Man of the Plains (1950) – Jesse James
- The Cariboo Trail (1950) – Will Gray
- Two Flags West (1950) – Lem
- Call Me Mister (1951) – Capt. Johnny Comstock
- Take Care of My Little Girl (1951) – Joe Blake
- The Secret of Convict Lake (1951) – Narrator (voice, uncredited)
- Golden Girl (1951) – Tom Richmond
- Return of the Texan (1952) – Sam Crockett
- The Outcasts of Poker Flat (1952) – John Oakhurst
- Lydia Bailey (1952) – Albion Hamlin
- Lure of the Wilderness (1952) – Opening off-screen narrator (voice, uncredited)
- O. Henry's Full House (1952) – Barney Woods (segment "The Clarion Call")
- The Silver Whip (1953) – Race Crim
- The Farmer Takes a Wife (1953) – Dan Harrow
- Devil's Canyon (1953) – Billy Reynolds
- City of Bad Men (1953) – Brett Stanton
- The Gambler from Natchez (1954) – Capt. Vance Colby
- Sitting Bull (1954) – Major Robert 'Bob' Parrish
- Top of the World (1955) – Maj. Lee Gannon
- Son of Sinbad (1955) – Sinbad
- The Ford Television Theatre (1956) – Donny Weaver (1 episode, "The Face")
- A Day of Fury (1956) – Jagade
- Dakota Incident (1956) – John Banner
- High Terrace (1956) – Bill Lang
- Schlitz Playhouse of Stars (1956) – Jim Hardie (1 episode, A Tale of Wells Fargo)
- Hell Canyon Outlaws (1957) – Sheriff Caleb Wells
- Tales of Wells Fargo (1957–1962) – Jim Hardie (all 201 episodes)
- Anna of Brooklyn (1958) – Raffaele
- Gunfight at Black Horse Canyon (1961, TV movie) – Jim Hardie
- Law of the Lawless (1964) – Judge Clem Rogers
- Blood on the Arrow (1964) – Wade Cooper
- The Man from Button Willow (1965) – Justin Eagle (voice)
- Coast of Skeletons (1965) – A. J. Magnus
- The Hollywood Squares (1966) – himself (5 episodes)
- Scalplock (1966, TV movie) – Benjamin Calhoun (a repackaging of the series pilot of Iron Horse)
- The One Eyed Soldiers (1966) – Richard Owen
- Iron Horse (1966–1968) – Benjamin Calhoun (all 48 episodes)
- The Dean Martin Show (1969) – himself (1 episode)
- Death Valley Days (1969–1970) – host (26 episodes)
- East Connection (1970)
- Aru heishi no kake (The Walking Major, 1970) – Major Clark J. Allen
- The Six Million Dollar Man (1974) – himself (1 episode)
- Melvin Purvis: G-Man (1974, TV movie) – Melvin Purvis
- The Kansas City Massacre (1975, TV movie) – Melvin Purvis
- Fantasy Island (1979) – Peter Dawlings (1 episode)
- The Last Ride of the Dalton Gang (1979, TV movie) – Judge Isaac C. Parker
- The Love Boat (1980) – Mason Fleers (1 episode)
- Dynasty (1981) – Walter Lankershim (9 episodes)
- Dallas (1982) – Frank Crutcher (5 episodes)
- The New Hollywood Squares (1987) – himself (1 episode)
- J.J. Starbuck (1987–1988) – J.J. Starbuck (all 16 episodes)
- Murder, She Wrote (1988–1989) – Col. Lee Goddard (2 episodes, uncredited)
- Wind in the Wire (1993, TV movie)
- Harts of the West (1993–1994) – Zeke (3 episodes, final role)

== Radio appearances ==
Year	Program	Episode/source
1952	Lux Radio Theatre	Take Care of My Little Girl
