= Guy Deghy =

Hungarian-born actor (1912–1992)

- in Where Eagles Dare (1968)
- Born: Gedeon Aladar Istvan Deghy; 11 October 1912; Budapest, Austria-Hungary
- Died: 25 February 1992 (aged 79); London, England
- Years active: 1944-1989

Guy Deghy (born Gedeon Aladar Istvan Deghy; 11 October 1912 – 25 February 1992), was a Hungarian-born radio producer and actor who appeared largely in British films and television.

== Career ==
Deghy was first a producer for BBC Leeds. The Leeds-born novelist, playwright and journalist Keith Waterhouse recalls in his autobiography, City Lights, submitting his first radio play, The Town That Wouldn't Vote: I was summoned to the BBC to meet my producer, Guy Stephen Deghy, (whom) I recognised as one of the bearded bohemians of Whitelock's (Ale House). Despite a 20-year age gap, Guy and I hit it off from the start, and we were to become lifelong friends. Eventually, Deghy took off for London to act (and) write . . . a further spur to my ambition to reach my Chelsea garret.

Deghy appeared in the 5th episode of the first season of The Saint depicting Inspector Oscar Kleinhaus, also making another appearance as the same character in an episode of the 5th series, as well as appearances in an additional episode and a TV movie as different characters. Another example was his 1960 appearance in the Patrick McGoohan television series Danger Man episode "The Traitor" as a guard on a train as well as in the 1961 episode "Name, Date and Place" as Vogel.

Deghy also appeared on the London stage.

He died in London, at the age of 79, on 25 February 1992.

== Selected filmography ==
- Mister Emmanuel (1944) - Police Lieutenant
- Against the Wind (1948) - German Sergeant Major
- The Fake (1953) - Stranger (uncredited)
- The Divided Heart (1954) - Schoolteacher
- Companions in Crime (1954)
- The Colditz Story (1955) - German Soldier
- The Constant Husband (1955) - Stromboli
- Little Red Monkey (1955) - Social Club Recreation Director
- All for Mary (1955) - Ski Instructor
- Lost (1956) - Erikkson (uncredited)
- The Steel Bayonet (1957) - Artillery N.C.O.
- Carve Her Name with Pride (1958) - SS Man (uncredited)
- The Mouse That Roared (1959) - Soviet Ambassador (uncredited)
- The House of the Seven Hawks (1959) - Desk Lieutenant
- Follow That Horse! (1960) - German Delegate (uncredited)
- Surprise Package (1960) - Tibor Smolny
- A Matter of WHO (1961) - Ivonovitch
- The Silent Invasion (1962) - Pierre
- Sammy Going South (1963) - Doctor
- The Mouse on the Moon (1963) - Russian Scientist
- Becket (1964) - Minor Role (uncredited)
- Devil Doll (1964) - Hans (uncredited)
- The Comedy Man (1964) - Schuyster
- The Yellow Rolls-Royce (1964) - Mayor
- Operation Crossbow (1965) - Dutch Barge Skipper (uncredited)
- The One Eyed Soldiers (1966) - Harold Schmidt / Zavo
- Spia spione (1967)
- Dark of the Sun (1968) - Delage
- Amsterdam Affair (1968) - Will Munch
- Duffy (1968) - Captain Schallert
- Subterfuge (1968) - Dr. Lundgren
- Where Eagles Dare (1968) - Major Wilhelm Wilner (uncredited)
- Vendetta for the Saint (1969) - Maresciallo
- Before Winter Comes (1969) - Kovacs
- A Walk with Love and Death (1969) - The Priest
- The Looking Glass War (1970) - Fritsche
- The Kremlin Letter (1970) - Professor
- Cry of the Banshee (1970) - Party Guest
- Been Down So Long It Looks Like Up to Me (1971) - Kovacs
- Universal Soldier (1972) - Timmerman
- March or Die (1977) - Ship's Captain
- The Greek Tycoon (1978) - Tablir
- Success Is the Best Revenge (1984) - Angry Old Man
