= The One Eyed Soldiers =

1966 film by Jean Christophe

- Film poster
- Directed by: John Ainsworth (credited as Jean Christophe)
- Written by: John Ainsworth; Richard Aubrey
- Produced by: Clive Sharp
- Starring: Dale Robertson; Luciana Paluzzi; Guy Deghy
- Cinematography: Branko Ivatovic
- Music by: Various
- Production companies: Avala Film; United Screen Arts
- Release date: 1966
- Running time: 80 minutes 74 minutes (DVD)
- Countries: United Kingdom; Italy; Yugoslavia; United States
- Language: English

The One Eyed Soldiers is a 1966 United Kingdom/Yugoslavian/Italian/United States international co-production crime film shot in Yugoslavia that was directed and co-written by John Ainsworth under the name of Jean Christophe. The film, shot in Ultrascope starred and was co-produced by Dale Robertson for his United Screen Arts company that released the film in the USA as a double feature with Secret Agent Super Dragon.

== Plot ==
A United Nations diplomat is murdered by being thrown off a building in a European nation. His dying words are "the one eyed soldiers." The murder and cryptic message lead to the police, to the diplomat's daughter and American reporter. A criminal syndicate led by a sadistic dwarf and a Sydney Greenstreet type smuggler and his mute assistant battle each other.

== Cast ==
- Dale Robertson as Richard Owen
- Luciana Paluzzi as Gava Berens
- Guy Deghy as Harold Schmidt / Zavo
- Andrew Faulds as Colonel Ferrer
- Mile Avramovic as Antonio Caporelli

*Mirko Boman as The Mute 

- Bozidar Drnic as Dr. Charles Berens
- Dragan Nikolić as Officer
- Dusan Tadic as Bandit
- Milan Bosiljcic as Waiter

== Production ==
In 1965 actor Dale Robertson formed his own production company United Screen Arts (USA). On 27 August of that year it was announced that USA announced a three way production deal between their company Yugoslavia's Avala Film and Switzerland to film The One Eyed Soldiers with Robertson and originally Rosanna Schiaffino. The film was budgeted at US$1,700,000

== Soundtrack ==
The film featured music from several different European films including Before It's Too Late from Agent 077: From the Orient with Fury.
