= Richard A. Harris =

American film editor

- Born: February 6, 1934 (age 92); New York City, New York, U.S.
- Education: USC School of Cinematic Arts
- Occupation: Film editor
- Awards: See below

Richard A. Harris (born February 6, 1934) is an American film editor with a career spanning nearly 40 years. He won the Academy Award for Best Film Editing for his work on Titanic (1997), with a previous nomination for Terminator 2: Judgment Day (1991).

== Life and career ==
He graduated from the School of Cinematic Arts of the University of Southern California in 1956. He is most associated with the films of Michael Ritchie (Downhill Racer, The Candidate, An Almost Perfect Affair), James Cameron (Terminator 2: Judgment Day, True Lies, Titanic), Dan Curtis and Mick Jackson

== Filmography ==
=== Feature films ===
==== As director ====
Year	Title	Notes
1983	The American Snitch	

==== As editor ====
Year	Title	Director	Notes
1968	The Bamboo Saucer	Frank Telford	
1969	Downhill Racer	Michael Ritchie	
1971	Dusty and Sweets McGee	Floyd Mutrux	
1971	The Christian Licorice Store	James Frawley	
1971	Chandler	Paul Magwood	with William B. Gulick
1972	The Candidate	Michael Ritchie	with Robert Estrin
1974	Catch My Soul	Patrick McGoohan	
1975	Smile	Michael Ritchie	
1976	The Bad News Bears	Michael Ritchie	
1977	Semi-Tough	Michael Ritchie	
1978	The Bad News Bears Go to Japan	John Berry	with Dennis Virkler
1979	An Almost Perfect Affair	Michael Ritchie	
1980	The Island	Michael Ritchie	
1982	The Toy	Richard Donner	with Michael A. Stevenson
1983	The Survivors	Michael Ritchie	
1985	Fletch	Michael Ritchie	
1986	Wildcats	Michael Ritchie	
1986	The Golden Child	Michael Ritchie	
1988	The Couch Trip	Michael Ritchie	
1989	Fletch Lives	Michael Ritchie	Also associate producer
1991	L.A. Story	Mick Jackson	with Greg Le Duc
1991	Terminator 2: Judgment Day	James Cameron	with Conrad Buff IV and Mark Goldblatt
1992	The Bodyguard	Mick Jackson	with Donn Cambern
1993	Last Action Hero	John McTiernan	with John Wright
1994	True Lies	James Cameron	with Conrad Buff IV and Mark Goldblatt
1997	Titanic	James Cameron	with Cameron and Conrad Buff IV
2008	The X-Files: I Want to Believe	Chris Carter	
2010	Flying Lessons	Derek Magyar	

=== Television films and miniseries ===
Year	Title	Director	Notes
1974	Scream of the Wolf	Dan Curtis	
1974	Bram Stoker's Dracula	Dan Curtis	
1974	Melvin Purvis: G-Man	Dan Curtis	with Corky Ehlers
1974	The Great Ice Rip-Off	Dan Curtis	
1975	The Kansas City Massacre	Dan Curtis	with Dennis Virkler
1977	Murder at the World Series	Andrew V. McLaglen	with John F. Link
1982	The Executioner's Song	Lawrence Schiller	with Tom Rolf
1983	Tiger Town	Alan Shapiro	with John F. Link
1984	Her Life as a Man	Robert Ellis Miller	
1988	14 Going on 30	Paul Schneider	
1989	My Boyfriend's Back	Paul Schneider	
1989	A Mother's Courage: The Mary Thomas Story	John Patterson	
1995	Indictment: The McMartin Trial	Mick Jackson	

== Awards and nominations ==
Award	Year	Category	Work	Result	Ref.
Academy Award	1992	Best Film Editing	Terminator 2: Judgment Day	Nominated	
Academy Award	1998	Best Film Editing	Titanic	Won	
American Cinema Editors Award	1992	Best Edited Feature Film – Dramatic	Terminator 2: Judgment Day	Nominated	
American Cinema Editors Award	1995	Best Edited Feature Film – Dramatic	True Lies	Nominated	
American Cinema Editors Award	1996	Best Edited Miniseries or Motion Picture for Television	Indictment: The McMartin Trial	Won	
American Cinema Editors Award	1998	Best Edited Feature Film – Dramatic	Titanic	Won	
British Academy Film Award	1998	Best Editing	Titanic	Nominated	
CableACE Award	1995	Editing a Dramatic Special or Miniseries	Indictment: The McMartin Trial	Won	
Primetime Emmy Award	1995	Outstanding Picture Editing for a Limited or Anthology Series or Movie	Indictment: The McMartin Trial	Won	
Satellite Award	1998	Best Editing	Titanic	Won	
