= Return of the Texan =

1952 film by Delmer Daves

- Film poster
- Directed by: Delmer Daves
- Screenplay by: Dudley Nichols
- Based on: Fred Gipson (Based on a Novel by)
- Produced by: Frank P. Rosenberg
- Starring: Dale Robertson; Joanne Dru; Walter Brennan
- Cinematography: Lucien Ballard
- Edited by: Louis R. Loeffler
- Music by: Sol Kaplan
- Color process: Black and white
- Production company: 20th Century-Fox
- Distributed by: 20th Century-Fox
- Release date: February 13, 1952
- Running time: 88 minutes
- Country: United States
- Language: English

Return of the Texan is a 1952 American Western film directed by Delmer Daves and starring Dale Robertson, Joanne Dru and Walter Brennan.

== Plot ==
After his wife dies, Sam Crockett honors her last wish by moving back to their native Texas with their two sons and Grandpa Firth. They have a farm there that is in serious disrepair.

Neighbor and old acquaintance Rod Murray has become owner of a large ranch by marrying Averill Marshall. He hates poachers and resents Grandpa hunting deer on his land. He also is unhappy that Averill's sister Ann, engaged to a doctor, is developing a romantic interest in Sam.

Sam needs money and does some fencing work for Rod, who is slow to pay him, leading to a fight. Grandpa suffers a stroke and Ann helps nurse him back to health. She knows that Sam still loves his late wife, but persuades him that they can begin a life of their own.

== Cast ==
- Dale Robertson as Sam Crockett
- Joanne Dru as Ann Marshall
- Walter Brennan as Grandpa Firth Crockett
- Richard Boone as Rod Murray
- Tom Tully as Stud Spiller
- Robert Horton as Dr. Jim Harris
- Helen Westcott as Averill Murray
- Lonnie Thomas as Yo-Yo Crockett
- Dennis Ross as Steve Crockett
- Willis Bouchey as Isham Gilder

== See also ==
- List of American films of 1952
