= Top of the World (1955 film) =

1955 film by Lewis R. Foster

- Theatrical release poster
- Directed by: Lewis R. Foster
- Screenplay by: John D. Klorer; N. Richard Nash
- Produced by: Lewis R. Foster; Michael Baird
- Starring: Dale Robertson; Evelyn Keyes; Frank Lovejoy; Nancy Gates; Paul Fix; Robert Arthur; Peter Hansen
- Cinematography: William H. Clothier; Harry J. Wild; Paul Mantz (aerial photography)
- Edited by: Robert Ford
- Music by: Albert Glasser
- Production company: Landmark Productions
- Distributed by: United Artists
- Release date: May 1955
- Running time: 91 minutes
- Country: United States
- Language: English

Top of the World is a 1955 American aviation adventure film, directed by Lewis R. Foster, and written by John D. Klorer and N. Richard Nash. The film starred Dale Robertson, Evelyn Keyes, Frank Lovejoy, Nancy Gates, Paul Fix, Robert Arthur, and Peter Hansen. Composer Albert Glasser composed the music to the film.

Top of the World was released in May 1955, by United Artists. The United States Air Force endeavoured to support the production of Top of the World as a means to inform the public of the work of the USAF in the far north. USAF photographers would work directly with studio cinematographers. Major Stockton Shaw was assigned to the production as a technical advisor. (Note: A unique collection of USAF aircraft were on hand. These included Boeing SB-17G, Cessna LC-126, Douglas C-47 Skytrain and Waco CG-15 rescue aircraft and North American F-82 Twin Mustang and Northrop F-89 Scorpion fighters.)

== Plot ==
Unable to fly jet missions at his age, Major (soon promoted to Lieutenant Colonel) Lee Gannon (Dale Robertson) is reassigned from a Californian air base to a weather station in Alaska, against his wishes. He perks up on learning that ex-wife Virgie (Evelyn Keyes) now owns a nightclub in Fairbanks.

Gannon reports for duty to Major Brad Cantrell (Frank Lovejoy), who explains to a skeptical Gannon how vital the weather situation is, apparently in a remote region near the North Pole that could be vulnerable to a Soviet air attack. Lieutenant Mary Ross (Nancy Gates), who handles public relations, is in love with Cantrell, but he has become attracted to Virgie and plans to marry her.

Virgie reveals a dark secret about her marriage with Gannon, then accuses Cantrell of sending her former husband on a dangerous mission just to get him out of the way. Stationed on a large block of drift ice far north of Alaska, Gannon and his men are at great risk as the floe melts and rescue aircraft are unable to land. Cantrell pilots a glider to rescue the men, with Gannon volunteering to be left behind, then stages a daring return trip. Gannon realizes he still loves Virgie, and a relieved Mary realizes she has not lost Cantrell.

== Cast ==
- Dale Robertson as Maj. Lee Gannon
- Evelyn Keyes as Virgie Rayne
- Frank Lovejoy as Maj. Brad Cantrell
- Nancy Gates as Lt. Mary Ross
- Paul Fix as Maj. George French
- Robert Arthur as Lt. Skippy McGuire
- Peter Hansen as Capt. Cochrane
- Nick Dennis as Master Sgt. Cappi
- Russ Conway as Col. Nelson
- William Schallert as Capt. Harding
- Peter Bourne as Lt. "Johnny" Johnson
- David McMahon as Brownie
- Marya Marco as Koora

== Production ==
Top of the World began as a Warner Bros. vehicle with filming taking place in 1953 when the then director Felix Feist, "air boss" Paul Mantz and cinematographer William H. Clothier were dispatched to Ladd Army Airfield and Baker Island Airfield in Alaska. The group were able to spend a month with USAF units filming their operations.

While in Alaska, the Warner Bros. crew were on hand to film a dramatic rescue mission from the B-25 camera ship brought by Paul Mantz. The scene was later incorporated in the final film. Shortly after, in 1954, the film rights were acquired by Lippert Pictures and United Artists.

Clothier was in charge of the aerial sequences. He said he used an Arriflex 35 camera to shoot scenes in the film. Paul Mantz used his B-25 bomber as a camera platform for the production, as well as flying as a contract pilot in aerial scenes.

== Reception ==
Top of the World opened in Los Angeles on April 25, 1955, to generally positive critical reviews. Variety noted that, "Details here are handled in such a fashion as to be interesting without becoming tedious as they blend into and service the personal dramatics."

Aviation film historian Stephen Pendo in Aviation in the Cinema, considered Top of the World to have "... some exciting moments during survival and rescue scenes."
