= Devil's Canyon (1953 film) =

1953 film by Alfred L. Werker

- Theatrical release poster
- Directed by: Alfred L. Werker
- Screenplay by: Frederick Hazlitt Brennan; Harry Essex
- Story by: Bennett Cohen; Norton S. Parker
- Produced by: Edmund Grainger
- Starring: Virginia Mayo; Dale Robertson; Stephen McNally; Arthur Hunnicutt
- Cinematography: Nicholas Musuraca
- Edited by: Gene Palmer
- Music by: Daniele Amfitheatrof
- Production company: RKO Pictures
- Distributed by: RKO Pictures
- Release dates: August 6, 1953 (Preview); August 19, 1953 (U.S.); October 2, 1953 (New York)
- Running time: 92 minutes
- Country: United States
- Language: English
- Box office: $1,100,000 (US)

Devil's Canyon is a 1953 American Western 3-D film directed by Alfred L. Werker. The film stars Virginia Mayo, Dale Robertson, Stephen McNally and Arthur Hunnicutt.

== Plot ==
In 1897 Arizona, female outlaw Abby Nixon warns lawman Billy Reynolds that her accomplices Bud and Cole Gorman are nearby. Reynolds kills both men in a gunfight, but finds himself arrested for murder, convicted and sentenced to a desert prison known as Devil's Canyon.

One of the prisoners there is a third Gorman brother, the ruthless Jesse, who intends to exact revenge. Jesse is also romantically involved with Abby but is unaware that it was she who informed Reynolds of his brothers' whereabouts.

Reynolds is treated fairly by Morgan, the warden, but not by Captain Wells, a sadistic guard. Abby is also sent to Devil's Canyon for a robbery. To keep her as far as possible from the male inmates, Abby is assigned to work with Dr. Betts in the prison infirmary. She treats Reynolds' wounds after Jesse injures him in a fight.

Abby plots a jailbreak. Sneaking guns to Joe and Red, Jesse's outlaw partners, she tries to persuade Reynolds to join them. He refuses, respecting the law and also distrusting Jesse. Wells finds knives in Reynolds' cell that had been planted there by Jesse. As a result, Reynolds is placed in solitary, which will make it easier for Jesse to kill him during the prison break.

During the breakout, Jesse takes command of the prison and shoots Wells in cold blood. Guards are taken hostage and the other prisoners are set free. Abby is now afraid of Jesse and his violent ways, and he slaps her and leaves her behind. She frees Reynolds, who takes control of the guards' machine-gun nest, kills Jesse and orders the others back to their cells. The warden vows to do everything in his power to secure pardons for Reynolds and Abby.

== Cast ==
- Virginia Mayo as Abby
- Dale Robertson as Reynolds
- Stephen McNally as Jesse
- Arthur Hunnicutt as Frank Taggert
- Robert Keith as Warden Morgan
- Jay C. Flippen as Capt. Wells
- George J. Lewis as Colonel Jorge Gomez
- Whit Bissell as Virgil Gates
- Earl Holliman as Joe
- Paul Fix as Gatling Guard

== Production ==
Yvonne De Carlo was originally cast for the female leading role.

The film's working title was Arizona Outpost. It was first screened for a preview audience in Pittsburgh on August 6, 1953.

== Reception ==
In a contemporary review for The New York Times, critic Bosley Crowther wrote: "Outside of a couple of seedy specimens, played by Arthur Hunnicutt and Jay C. Flippen, the yarn is as flat as the desert on which the prison is set. And that is a fact, for all the 3-D in which the picture is made. Once more it is evident that a mechanical technique is no salvation for a meagre film."

Reviewer Hortense Morton of the San Francisco Examiner wrote: "'Devil's Canyon' is as violent as a volcano and director Alfred Werker has polished every facet of the Frederick Hazlitt Brennan screen play until life within the walls of a prison in Territorial Arizona becomes just as realistic as any law-abiding citizen can handle in one dose."
