= The Kansas City Massacre =

- Genre: Crime; Drama
- Written by: William F. Nolan; Ric Hardman
- Directed by: Dan Curtis
- Starring: Dale Robertson
- Theme music composer: Bob Cobert
- Country of origin: United States
- Original language: English

Production
- Producer: Dan Curtis
- Production locations: 20th Century Fox Studios - 10201 Pico Blvd., Century City, Los Angeles, California; Marysville, California
- Cinematography: Paul Lohmann
- Editors: Richard A. Harris; Dennis Virkler
- Running time: 100 minutes
- Production company: ABC Circle Films

Original release
- Network: ABC
- Release: September 19, 1975

Related
- Dillinger; Melvin Purvis: G-Man

The Kansas City Massacre is a 1975 American television film about Melvin Purvis. It is the second spin-off of the 1973 film Dillinger, following Melvin Purvis: G-Man in 1974, also directed by Dan Curtis and starring Dale Robertson as Purvis.

== Plot ==
Gangsters free one of their colleagues Frank Nash being escorted to prison and kill several FBI agents and local police officers in the attempt. FBI agent Melvin Purvis puts together a special squad to track down and capture the men responsible.

== Cast ==
- Dale Robertson as FBI Agent Melvin Purvis
- Bo Hopkins as Charles "Pretty Boy" Floyd
- Elliott Street as George "Baby Face" Nelson
- Harris Yulin as John Lazia
- Matt Clark as Verne Miller
- Scott Brady as Commissioner Herbert Tucker McElwaine
- John Karlen as FBI Agent Sam Cowley
- Lynn Loring as Vi Morland
- Robert Walden as Adam Richetti
- Mills Watson as Frank "Jelly" Nash
- Philip Bruns as Captain Jackson
- William Jordan as John Dillinger
- Sally Kirkland as Wilma Floyd
- Morgan Paull as Alvin Karpis
- Ike Eisenmann as Jimmie Floyd
- Brion James as Homer Van Meter
- James Gammon as Garth

== Production ==
Filming was done in Marysville, California.

== Reception ==
The Los Angeles Times called it "a smartly produced, sharply acted slice of TV entertainment."

== See also ==
- List of American films of 1975
