= Michigan Bar, California =

Michigan Bar
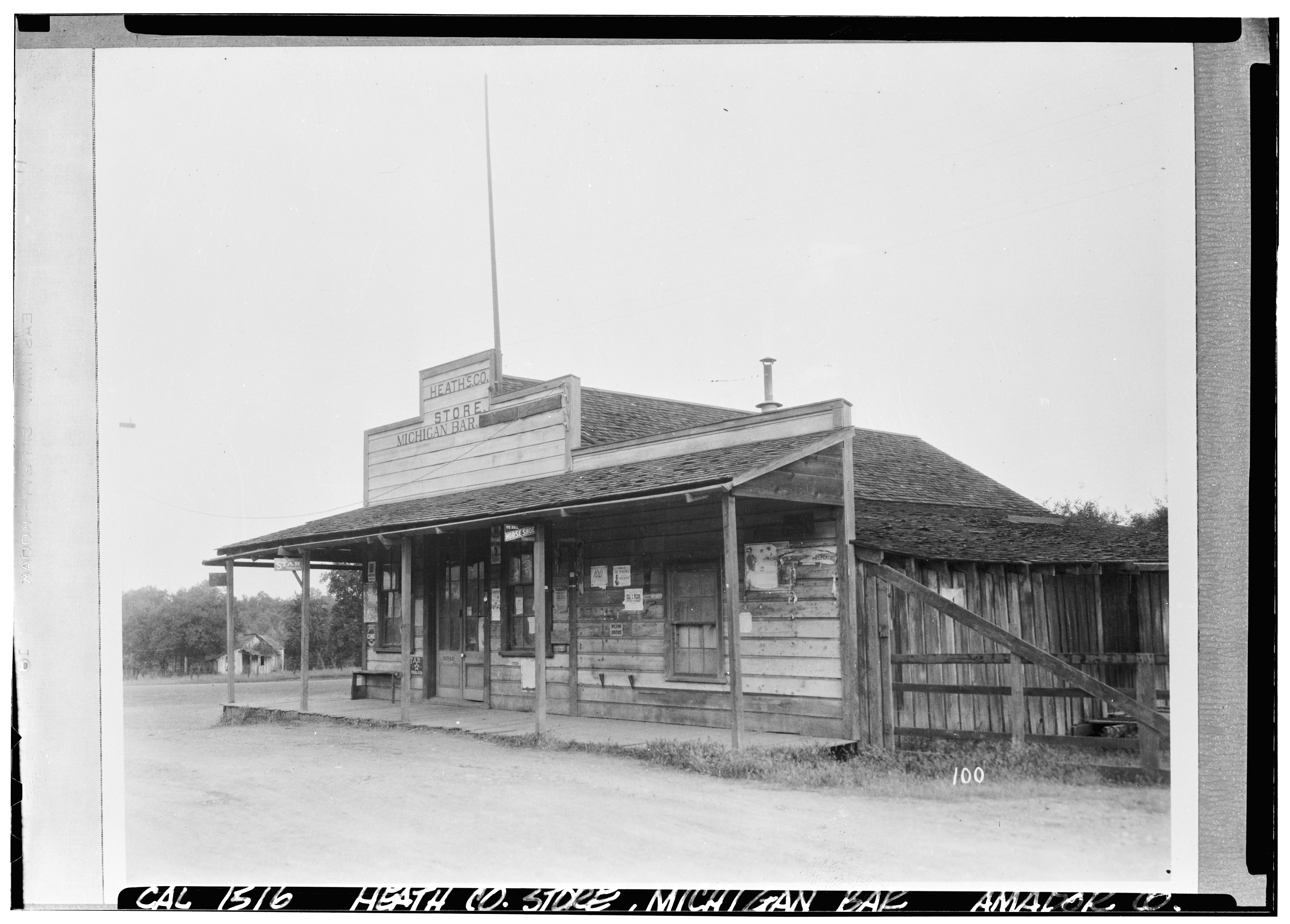
- Heath's Store, Michigan Bar. April 1940.
- Interactive map of Michigan Bar
- 38.4999°N 121.0453°W
- Location: Sacramento County

California Historical Landmark
- Designated: August 30, 1950
- Reference no.: 468

Michigan Bar was a former mining camp near a sandbar in the Cosumnes River in Sacramento County, California, United States which was founded by two gold miners from Michigan. The town site expanded out of the mining camp and by the 1850s contained a population of approximately 1500. By 1899, it had its own post office. Later hydraulic mining destroyed the original settlement, when the name came to designate a mining district.

California Historical Landmark #468 marks part of the town as well as the mining district.
