= Terminator 2 (disambiguation) =

Terminator 2: Judgment Day is a 1991 science-fiction action film directed by James Cameron

Terminator 2 may also refer to:

== Video games ==
- Terminator 2: Judgment Day (arcade game)
- Terminator 2 (computer game)
- Terminator 2 (Game Boy video game)
- Terminator 2 (8-bit video game)
- Terminator 2 (16-bit video game)
- Terminator 2D: No Fate

== Other uses ==
- Terminator the Second, a play based on Terminator 2: Judgement Day
- T2-3D: Battle Across Time
- Terminator 2, the original title for the 1989 film, Shocking Dark
