= Town and Country =

Town and Country (and variants) may refer to:

== Business ==
- Town & Country Bank, former Australian bank
- Town & Country Club (Saint Paul, Minnesota), a golf club in St. Paul, Minnesota
- Town & Country Food Stores, a chain of convenience stores headquartered in San Angelo, Texas
- Town & Country Surf Designs (disambiguation), a Hawaiian surf brand of surfboards, clothing, games, and other related products
- Town & Country, a discount store owned by Lane Bryant

=== Malls and shopping centers ===
- Town & Country Mall (fl. 1990s), a mall in Houston, Texas
- Town & Country Village (Houston), a shopping center in Houston, Texas
- Town and Country Shopping Center (Kettering), a mall in Kettering, Ohio
- Town & Country Shopping Center, one of United States' first (Opened March 1, 1949) regional shopping centers, located in Whitehall, Ohio

== Entertainment ==
- Town and Country Magazine, founded 1769, a British monthly magazine
- Town and Country (play), 1807 play by Thomas Morton
- Town & Country (magazine), founded 1846, an American magazine
- Town and Country (album), a 1969 album by Humble Pie
- Town & Country (band), a 1998 American rock band
- Town & Country (film), a 2001 film starring Warren Beatty and Diane Keaton

== Towns ==
- Town 'n' Country, Florida
- Town and Country, Missouri
- Town and Country, Washington

== Other ==
- Town and Country Club, a live music venue in Leeds
- The Town & Country Club, a live music venue in London
- Chrysler Town & Country (minivan), a minivan manufactured by Chrysler
- Chrysler Town & Country (1941–1988), cars manufactured by Chrysler
