= Outback Jack (wrestler) =

Australian professional wrestler (born 1958)

Personal information
- Born: Peter Stilsbury; 4 February 1958 (age 68) Victoria, Australia

Professional wrestling career
- Ring name(s): The Mercenary; Sgt. Green; Outback Jack
- Billed height: 6 ft 5 in (1.96 m)
- Billed weight: 300 lb (140 kg)
- Billed from: Humpty Doo, NT, Australia
- Trained by: Les Thornton
- Debut: November 1986
- Retired: May 1988

Peter Stilsbury (born 4 February 1958) is an Australian former professional wrestler, best known for appearing in the World Wrestling Federation as Outback Jack from 1986 to 1988. He portrayed a northern Australian bushman coming to America to compete in the WWF.

== Professional wrestling career ==
=== Early career ===
Stilsbury started his career in Canada with Stu Hart's Stampede Wrestling in November 1986. He was brought into the WWF that month in response to the mainstream popularity of the Australian film Crocodile Dundee. Wearing an Australian bush jacket, he appeared in several vignettes hyping his debut by showing him in the wilds of the Australian Outback—specifically, the Northern Territory. In the vignettes, he drove a Jeep and drank beer with cows. In addition, as part of the storyline, he claimed to have learned survival skills from the Aborigines.

=== World Wrestling Federation (1986–1988) ===
Stilsbury, as Outback Jack, made his WWF debut in November 1986. His wins mainly came over jobbers such as Jose Estrada, Steve Lombardi, Barry O, Barry Horowitz and "Iron" Mike Sharpe. However, Outback Jack also defeated well-known superstars such as Nikolai Volkoff and former WWE Champion The Iron Sheik. Eventually, Stilsbury started becoming a jobber himself, losing matches to high-level superstars such as "Million Dollar Man" Ted DiBiase and Rick Rude. Outback Jack feuded with Frenchy Martin, and the two had matches featured on May 4 and 25 1987 episodes of WWF Prime Time Wrestling, both of which Outback Jack won. During this time, he also feuded with Killer Khan.

On 3 August episode of Prime Time Wrestling, Outback Jack rescued Tito Santana from an attack by Ron Bass, leading to a match between him and Bass later in the show, which Bass won. The pair continued to face each other into the following year. Outback Jack made one appearance on the interview segment The Snake Pit with Jake "The Snake" Roberts on 6 June.

On 7 May 1988 episode of WWF Superstars of Wrestling, Outback Jack competed in his final televised match, teaming with Brady Boone and Steve Blackman in a loss to The Islanders; this was the only match in which The Islanders competed as a team of three, as they were joined by new Islander Siva Afi. On 15 May, Outback Jack wrestled his last match in Kissimmee, Florida, against Greg Valentine. The outcome of his rematch with Valentine remains a mystery although Valentine had pinned him three days prior at the Columbus Municipal Auditorium. The WWF had LJN Wrestling Superstars create an Outback Jack action figure to be produced and distributed worldwide. His sudden departure from the WWF has led to him being described as "one of the most asked about people in the business".

== Personal life ==
Stilsbury is blind in one eye due to a helicopter crash, and has limited vision in his other due to diabetes.

== Awards and accomplishments ==
- Pro Wrestling Illustrated
  - PWI ranked him No. 371 of the top 400 wrestlers in WWE history in 2003
