= Texas Tank Bernard =

American professional wrestler

Professional wrestling career
- Ring name: Texas Tank Bernard
- Billed weight: 501 lb (227 kg)
- Billed from: Texas

Texas Tank Bernard was an American professional wrestler from Texas.

== Professional wrestling career ==
He wrestled in the South during the 1970s. Tex decided to go to wrestle in New York about 1978, including a wrestling promotion out of New York City, New York called Vega International Wrestling Promotions, promoted by Osvaldo Vega.

Tex had always been big, even when he was a child. He weighed 501 pounds in 1979. Tex also had experience in judo, jiu jitsu, and karate. His finishing move in the wrestling ring was the Big Splash.

During his time with Vega International Wrestling Promotions, he had many bloody wrestling matches with wrestler Mike DiBlanco. In 1979, after wrestling with Vega Promotions, Tex also wrestled with some World Wrestling Federation (WWF) wrestlers including Sammy Rivera and S. D. Jones.
