= Back to the Future (1989 video game) =

- Developer: Beam Software
- Publisher: LJN
- Producer: Andrew Davie
- Designers: Trevor Nuridin; Russell Conte
- Composer: Gavan Anderson
- Series: Back to the Future
- Platform: Nintendo Entertainment System
- Release: NA: September 1989
- Genre: Action
- Mode: Single-player

Back to the Future is a 1989 video game released by LJN for the Nintendo Entertainment System. The game is loosely based on the 1985 film of the same name. A sequel, Back to the Future Part II & III, was released in 1990.

== Gameplay ==
In the single mode game, the player controls Marty McFly through various stages set in 1955 in which he collects various clock icons in order to advance to the next level, and avoid the gradual vanishing of his future (indicated by a fading photograph at the bottom of the screen). If the photograph fades fully, Marty would lose a life as it would show him vanishing. Collecting 100 clocks restored the photograph to its full, unfaded status. Two power-ups can help improve Marty's control: bowling balls that can destroy enemies and a skateboard which can speed up gameplay. There are also three minigames at the end of each stage, featuring such scenarios as Marty repelling Biff Tannen's gang of bullies from a cafe, blocking all the kisses Lorraine sends Marty (in the shape of little hearts), and having to position his guitar properly to stay in tune at the dance in order for George and Lorraine to kiss. The gameplay on these stages is often compared to that of Paperboy. A certain score had to be achieved in order to complete each minigame. Failure would result in one loss of life and having to repeat the last street segment in order to once again attempt to subgame.

In the final stage, Marty gets to control the DeLorean time machine on the street at night, dodging lightning bolts and obstacles while accelerating in such a way as to reach 88 miles per hour (142 km/h) precisely at the end of the stage, enabling the time machine to bring Marty home to 1985. This stage is a one-shot attempt, regardless of how many lives the player may still have.

The game contains only two music tracks, both of which come from the film. The first is a cover of "The Power of Love" which plays throughout most of the game; the other is "Johnny B. Goode", which plays during the guitar level. Both songs are sped up in the game for unknown reasons.

If Marty loses all his lives, the player is shown a game over screen reading, "Tough luck Marty! It looks like you are stuck here". The player is also presented with this message if Marty fails to get the DeLorean to 88 mph by the time he reached the wires, regardless of how many lives he has left.

== Reception ==
Bob Gale, screenwriter of the Back to the Future films, has called the NES game "one of the worst games ever", and even insisted in interviews that fans should not buy it. According to Gale, LJN refused his requests to give input while the game was being developed; once he was shown the game, he asked them to make changes, but was told it was too late in the process to change anything.

VideoGames & Computer Entertainment gave the game an overall score of 4 with scores of 2 for sound and music, 5 for graphics, and 5 for playability. Chris Bieniek's review stated that it is "nearly impossible to get through the entire game without" the slow motion feature of the NES Advantage and that the difficulty of the game would give players the urge "to remove the cartridge and chuck it out the window". He criticized the music as repetitive and graphics as uninspired.

== Works cited ==
- Bieniek, Chris (March 1990). "Review: Back to the Future". VideoGames & Computer Entertainment. Beverly Hills: L.F.P. pp. 30–34.
