= Town & Country Surf Designs =

Town & Country Surf Designs may refer to:

- Town & Country Surf Designs, a Hawaiian surf brand of surfboards, clothing, games, and other related products
  - Town & Country Surf Designs: Wood & Water Rage, a 1988 surfing and skateboarding video game for the Nintendo Entertainment System
  - Town & Country II: Thrilla's Surfari, a 1992 surfing and skateboarding video game for the Nintendo Entertainment System
