= Jack Friedman =

American businessman (1939–2010)

- Born: July 9, 1939; New York City, U.S.
- Died: May 3, 2010 (aged 70); Los Angeles, California, U.S.
- Occupations: Entrepreneur, businessman

Jack Friedman (July 9, 1939 – May 3, 2010) was an American entrepreneur, businessman, veteran of the toy and video game industries, and a philanthropist. Regarded as an influential member in the toy and video game industries, Friedman founded the three toy companies LJN, THQ, and Jakks Pacific; LJN and THQ later switched focus to video games.

== Early life ==
Born in Queens, New York City on July 9, 1939, and raised Jewish by his mother, Friedman began his career in the 1960s as a sales representative for the toy company Norman J. Lewis Associates, selling plush toys and novelty items to stores along the East Coast.

== Career ==
=== LJN Toys ===
After working at Norman J. Lewis, Friedman began considering his own concepts for toy products. In 1967, he formed LJN Toys Ltd., which created toy lines and video games based on movies, television shows and celebrities. The company was established with the financial backing of Friedman's employer, Norman J. Lewis, who later sold his interest in the company to a Chinese investor. After Lewis moved on, Friedman remained committed to promoting the company's growth and focused the company's strategy toward licensing. Basing toys on popular characters wasn't a new concept, but Friedman had an instinct for recognizing blockbusters, could conceive products for diverse audiences, and could negotiate and execute licenses quickly, which brought the practice to a new level. LJN found initial success making merchandise from the film E.T. the Extra-Terrestrial. Friedman continued to acquire licenses, personally meeting with celebrities such as Michael Jackson and Brooke Shields, before making dolls based on their figure.

By 1983, LJN Toys had attained $51 million in sales and attracted the attention of MCA Inc., which was at the time the parent company of Universal Studios. MCA had been acquiring many companies during the mid-1980s, and had a particular interest in acquiring toy companies. In 1985, MCA acquired a 63 percent interest in LJN Toys, completing a $32 million stock deal that required Friedman to move to Los Angeles County, California. Friedman signed a long-term employment agreement with MCA and began running LJN Toys from southern California. Friedman was an avid movie fan, and had considered producing films, but after two years and just before MCA sold LJN to Acclaim Entertainment, Friedman left the company, preferring to be on his own in the business world. The LJN name was retired by Acclaim in 1995 but five years later in 2000 the LJN brand made one last unexpected appearance as game publisher for the critically panned racing game for the Sega Dreamcast and Microsoft Windows Spirit of Speed 1937 which earned the dubious distinction of the Worst Video Game of 2000 by the online gaming magazine GameSpot.

=== THQ ===
Friedman's next business venture was THQ. In 1990, Friedman founded THQ in Calabasas, California, with a personal investment of $1 million. During the summer of 1991, Friedman agreed to have THQ acquired by Trinity Acquisition Corp., a publicly held shell corporation that had been organized to raise capital for an unspecified future venture, in a stock swap valued at about $33 million with THQ's shareholders owning 51.7% of the new entity. Friedman became the president of the merged company.

During THQ's formative years, Friedman acquired licenses for Hollywood productions and focused the development of the company's video games on popular films. The company flourished at first, and Friedman sold his 46 percent stake in the company on its initial public offering, gaining $13 million. In 1992, THQ's sales greatly increased, jumping more than 70 percent, but the video game industry began to head towards a more technical focus. In an August 26, 2002, interview with the Los Angeles Business Journal, Jakks Pacific's chief financial officer, Joel Bennett, explained the turn of events. "Then," Bennett said, referring to the early 1990s, "games were more like toys than technology." When the development of game software evolved toward the technological side, "it became beyond Jack's comfort zone," Bennett explained. "He's kind of a low-tech guy."

Frustrated and stuck in a business where he increasingly had no natural affinity for, Friedman struggled to remain content at THQ. After the company reported a $18 million loss for 1994, Friedman left to start another venture. To assist in the venture's start-up, Friedman asked his longtime friend Stephen G. Berman to co-found the company with him. Between 1988 and 1991, Berman had served as president of Balanced Approach, Inc., a distributor of personal fitness products and services. Berman then left Balanced Approach in 1991 to join Friedman at THQ, where he served four years as vice president and managing director of THQ International, Inc., a subsidiary of THQ, Inc. THQ ceased operations in 2013.

=== Jakks Pacific ===
In 1995, with almost $3 million in personal investment, Friedman co-founded the toy company Jakks Pacific with Berman.

From the start, Friedman wanted to use Jakks Pacific to consolidate the fragmented toy industry. At the time, the industry was dominated by the "Big Two," Hasbro and Mattel, who together controlled one-third of the approximately $15 billion wholesale US toy industry. With plenty of room to grow the company to the ranks of Hasbro and Mattel, Friedman hoped to out-compete the hundreds of small competitors and the handful of medium-sized toy companies by acquiring their rivals and forging licensing agreements with other companies. During the company's first year, Friedman signed a licensing agreement with Titan Sports, at that time the parent company of the World Wrestling Federation (WWF) whose popularity exploded during the 1990s, which secured an important source of revenue for the company. The exclusive, ten-year deal gave Jakks Pacific the rights to develop and market a line of action figures based on the WWF's wrestling personalities, such as Stone Cold Steve Austin and the Undertaker. For the next several years, Jakks Pacific attained much of its growth from the licensing agreement and the thousands of WWF action figures that were produced, similar to how Hasbro began their growth through sales of G.I. Joe.

As the toy industry struggled with low profits, in 1999, the company was selected as one of the country's fastest-growing companies by Fortune magazine, a distinction it would earn for the next two years.

Friedman had a fondness for classic toys—die-cast collectible cars, metal trucks, bulldozers—and a business strategy that revolved around licensing toys and acquiring other companies. One company Jakks bought was Toymax, which made Funnoodle pool products such as pool noodles. It also developed a line of toys with Nickelodeon and manufactures products for Disney, Hello Kitty, Cabbage Patch Kids and many other well-known brands.

In April 2010 less than a month before his death, Friedman stepped down as CEO and accepted the position of Chairman Emeritus to spend more time with his family. Co-founder and friend Stephen Berman succeeded him as CEO.

== Philanthropy ==
Friedman was a philanthropist and supporter of the company's Jakks Cares program, which donated to organizations such as the Toy Industry Foundation, Camp Ronald McDonald for Good Times, the Special Olympics, Feed the Children, Boys & Girls Clubs of America, Marine Toys for Tots and more. In 2009, Jakks Pacific was recognized by the Los Angeles Business Journal as one of the "Top 20 Corporate Philanthropists in Los Angeles," and as a "Power Player Philanthropist" by the Toy Industry Foundation. Under the program, the company had donated over $40 million worth of toys and school supplies to children around the world as of 2010.

== Death and legacy ==
After being hospitalized at Ronald Reagan UCLA Medical Center for several weeks, Friedman died on May 3, 2010, at the age of 70 due to complications from a rare blood disorder.

Jakks Pacific's co-founder and CEO, Stephen Berman, said of Friedman:

"Jack was a legendary toymaker and a real titan in our industry. He dedicated his talents to Jakks Pacific for 15 years, and he will be sorely missed. On behalf of all JAKKS employees, we send our sincere condolences to his wife Karen and his children for their loss."
