= Friday the 13th (1989 video game) =

1989 video game

- Developer: Atlus
- Publisher: LJN
- Composer: Hirohiko Takayama
- Platform: Nintendo Entertainment System
- Release: NA: February 1989
- Mode: Single player

Friday the 13th is a video game developed by Atlus and published by LJN for the Nintendo Entertainment System. Based on the horror franchise of the same name, the player controls counselors at Camp Crystal Lake as they attempt to defeat Jason Voorhees. The game received generally negative reviews, with criticism centered on its high difficulty and poor gameplay.

== Gameplay ==
Gameplay of Friday the 13th

The player controls one of six camp counselors with varying levels of running, jumping, throwing and rowing ability in a side-scrolling perspective. The counselors start with a rock attack. The goal is to find and defeat Jason Voorhees three times. Along the paths are cabins, caves, a lake and wooded areas. Apart from the cabins, these areas have enemies like zombies, crows, and wolves. The player may upgrade their weapon upon finding a new one. A timed alarm appears at certain intervals, requiring the player to find Jason before he kills one or more children or a counselor. Using the map, the player must navigate to Jason's location or switch to the counselor being attacked and defeat him. If they do not make it in time, Jason will kill the counselors or the children.

Upon nearing Jason's location, he may appear on the path or in the lake and attack the player. When inside a cabin, Jason will attack the player in a way reminiscent of the video game Punch-Out!!. The player may light the fireplaces in the larger cabins. After lighting each fireplace, a flashlight and torch weapon become available. Notes are found in some of the large cabins, leading the player to other notes in different locations and eventually to new items. The goal is to survive for three days and three nights while attempting to find and kill Jason. The player may fight Jason's mother who is in a hidden locked room in the cave. She is represented as a Medusa-like floating head that swoops down to attack the player. Navigating in the woods or cave can be confusing as they are designed to disorient the player. They hide several locked rooms/cabins. If all counselors or children die, the game is over.

== Development and release ==
Friday the 13th was developed by Japanese company Atlus as an adaptation of the film franchise of the same name. The game was supervised by Atlus founder Hideyuki Yokoyama, who stated that he oversaw eight titles being produced for the North American market during this time. Ryutaro Ito, later a planner on the Shin Megami Tensei series, was a junior member at Atlus during the development of Friday the 13th. Working as a tester, he recalled it being very hard to progress in the game. He claimed that this was because it was a trend of certain publishers to make highly difficult NES releases for the US at the time. While the Friday the 13th franchise is known in Japan as 13-Nichi no Kinyōbi Shirīzu (13日の金曜日シリーズ), Ito said that the game project was abbreviated as 13 Kin (13金) among Atlus staff. Publisher LJN released Friday the 13th exclusively in North America in February 1989. It was produced as part of an "aggressive expansion" by LJN to focus on video games based on media licenses. The purple and blue outfit worn by Jason in the game may have been influenced by a Japanese promotional poster for Friday the 13th Part III that depicts him tinted by blue light.

== Reception ==
Friday the 13th was released in North America exclusively in February 1989, as part of LJN's focus on creating video games based on licenses, to poor critical reception. Game Informer lists the game among the most difficult horror games of all time. Michigan Daily's Matt Grandstaff called it a "poor offering" by LJN. GamePro listed it as the 10th worst video game based on a film, criticizing its "repetitive music score and amazingly frustrating gameplay". In 1997, Electronic Gaming Monthly ranked it the eighth worst console video game of all time. GamesRadar's Mikel Reparaz criticized its box, commenting that only LJN "would ever think to surround Jason Voorhees with neon-pastel vomit, thereby making him even more of an '80s relic than he already is." Writer Christopher Grant commented that the game was more terrible than the deaths of the campers in the first Friday the 13th film, calling it "craptacular". IGN's Levi Buchanan used this game as an example of LJN's poor development abilities. The book Vintage Games: An Insider Look at the History of Grand Theft Auto, Super Mario, and the Most Influential Games of All Time criticizes it for not being frightening, citing technical reasons for this. The authors of Nintendo Power rated Friday the 13th the sixth worst game ever made in the magazine's September 1997 issue. The writer stated "After playing a few minutes of this aardvark, you wanted Jason to slaughter all the counselors and then you. Anything so it would just end." Joystiq's James Ransom-Wiley noted it as a game that the staff "loved to hate." The Daily News of Los Angeles, however, noted it as a hit.

=== Legacy ===
In June 2013, the National Entertainment Collectibles Association released an exclusive figurine of the video game-style Jason with the turquoise and purple color palette to go along with their other horror figure, a video game-style Freddy Krueger based on LJN's A Nightmare on Elm Street.

In 2017, after developer IllFonic released Friday the 13th: The Game, a "Retro Jason" skin based on Jason from the 1989 game was added by developers in a video game patch to apologize to fans for issues the game experienced when initially released.

== See also ==
- Friday the 13th: The Computer Game
- Friday the 13th: The Game
- A Nightmare on Elm Street (1989 video game)
