= Friday the 13th: The Computer Game =

Friday the 13th
- Developer: Domark
- Publisher: Domark
- Platforms: Commodore 64, Amstrad CPC, ZX Spectrum
- Release: 1986
- Mode: Single-player

Friday the 13th: The Computer Game (often shortened to Friday the 13th) is the first game adaptation based on the films of the same name. It was released in 1986 by Domark for the Amstrad CPC, Commodore 64, and ZX Spectrum. The game was released on floppy diskette and cassette tape. The player's goal is to find and kill Jason, while making sure their friends or they themselves are not killed by Jason.

== Gameplay ==
The player can roam freely around the scenery and walk both inside and outside buildings. Jason, as well as other characters, do the same. It is the player's task to make sure their friends do not get killed by Jason, who often appears disguised as one of them, unless he is hit once and becomes visible as a man dressed in black. Various improvised weapons (e.g., a chainsaw, a pitchfork, a machete, etc.) are scattered around the camp and inside various buildings such as a barn, a church and a cabin. Once picked up, they can be used to confront Jason. There are five levels in the game and each time the player assumes the role of another character. The character assignment is random at the start of the round. The game uses an early pseudo-3D view along with a more traditional side view, depending on the character's location. The game also features a "fear meter", in the form of a blonde woman's head with hair standing on end, to symbolize the player character's level of fright at the time. Unlike the later Nintendo Entertainment System (NES) title, the game included scenes of gore consistent with the film franchise. For example, when a character is killed by Jason, sometimes there is a scream followed by a quick cut to a graphic image of a machete embedded into their head.

== Development ==
Domark based the game on Friday the 13th Part 2. The game was revealed to journalists at Ye Olde Cheshire Cheese in London, England. In the cellar of the pub, Dominic Wheatley, co-founder of Domark burst through a solid door dressed as Jason and holding a cleaver, scaring the assembled journalists. According to The Games Machine, some magazines refused to run ads for the game due to the game's graphic packaging; Crash ran ads for the game and prominently featured Jason Voorhees on the cover of issue #23, which caused the magazine to receive many complaints from parents, including one woman who also wrote to the Press Council about the incident. Computer Gamer described the game's advertising as being "the subject of much controversy"; in March 1986 it was reported that ads for Friday the 13th were withdrawn by Domark due to complaints about their violent content, and the cover was redesigned. Another redesigned version of the cover was used for copies sold at John Menzies stores, omitting the knife.

In regards to the game's controversial marketing and the criticism that children can buy the game, Dominic Wheatley stated that "Many X-rated films are accompanied by books which are often more vivid in their descriptions and yet under 18s can buy those. We are trying to amuse people — Friday the 13th will not incite anyone to run around and hurt someone."

The game came packaged with two capsules of fake blood, which was omitted when Prism Leisure re-released the game as a budget title. To promote the game, Domark ran a trivia contest in Amtix magazine, with two winners receiving a "ghost hunting" trip to New York. In a 1987 interview, Mark Strachan, co-founder of Domark, called the game "something I'd rather forget about", and said that the game's quality issues stemmed from being made by inexperienced programmers.

== Reception ==
Reception

Review scores
Publication	Score
Micromanía	8/10 (C64)
Computer + Video Games	7/10
Commodore Horizons	5/8 (C64)
Your Commodore	6.5/10 (C64)
Computer Gamer	2.5/5 (C64); 1.5/5 (Spectrum)
Sinclair User	2/5 (Spectrum)
Popular Computing Weekly	2/5
Crash	32% (Spectrum)
Commodore User	1.6/5 (C64)
Your Sinclair	3/10 (Spectrum)
Aktueller Software Markt	2.75/12
Zzap!64	13% (C64)

The game's main appeal was the obvious horror elements, which included atmospheric music and digitized screams. Some criticized that it changed elements from the franchise, such as Jason being dressed all in black, which has nothing in common with his appearance from the movies.

The game received otherwise negative reviews, regardless of the platform. Zzap!64 gave it 13%, Your Sinclair gave it 3/10, Crash 32% and Sinclair User 4/10.

In 1987, Crash called Friday the 13th "one of the worst tie-ins ever".
