= Major League Baseball (video game) =

1988 video game

- Developer: Atlus
- Publisher: LJN
- Programmer: David Rolfe
- Composer: Tsukasa Masuko
- Platform: Nintendo Entertainment System
- Release: NA: April 1988
- Genre: Sports (baseball)
- Modes: Single-player, multiplayer

Major League Baseball is a 1988 baseball video game developed by Atlus and published by LJN for the Nintendo Entertainment System. It is notable for being one of the first video games licensed by Major League Baseball, although it was not endorsed by the Major League Baseball Players Association. Without the backing of the Players Association, the game could not name the actual players, although it was able to use their numbers, thus accurately portraying the contemporary teams and their rosters. In doing so, it became the first baseball game for the Nintendo Entertainment System to carry official Major League Baseball licensing and lineups.

Major League Baseball featured many facets of realistic gameplay and a focus on managerial details, which stressed the importance of choosing a well-balanced team. Despite its graphical limitations, it was considered a three-dimensional game at the time and was featured in the first issue of Nintendo Power as compared to the system's other baseball games of the era.

== Development ==
Lineup selection screen.

In 1988, Atlus signed on to develop an "official" Major League Baseball game for the Nintendo Entertainment System, which would be a first for the console. American company LJN agreed to be the publisher and David Rolfe was brought on board as the game's programmer. Rolfe had previously worked with Activision and Intellivision.

== Gameplay ==
Officially licensed by Major League Baseball, the game features all twenty-six teams that existed in 1987. Additionally, the lineups and the player numbers are accurate to the team rosters that year. Since the game did not have the endorsement of the Major League Baseball Players Association at the time, the team members are only listed by number, not name. In addition to their numbers the players are represented by their statistics, abilities, throwing arm, and even placement in the batting order. 1988's Major League Baseball was therefore the first NES game to be officially endorsed by Major League Baseball and to feature accurate contemporary lineups, albeit without the actual player names attached to their numbers.

A Toronto Blue Jays player prepares to bunt.

Managerial decisions are a focus and game players are allowed to select their own lineups, although the game lacks Sabermetrics statistics due to the limitations of the era. Instead, the "manager" must make their decisions based on data such as player's average and home run totals. They also have the ability to change and decide who will be a pinch-hitter and who will be a substitute pitcher. One is even allowed to pick out a designated hitter. The game prohibits one from putting out more team members in a certain part of the field than would normally be allowed, which makes deciding which player will be used where a part of the experience.

There are three modes that can be played with teams from either the American League or the National League: regular season games, All-star games or the World Series (interleague). The World Series rounds, however, are only one match each, which is not accurate to the real World Series. Due to the licensing, the teams even appear complete in their official uniforms and colours and also have all the options that a real baseball player would have, including bunting, pitching out, base stealing and throwing errors.

=== Gameplay limitations ===
In Major League Baseball, the pitcher is unable to move around the pitcher's mound and many are also able to perform the feat of 100 mph (160 km/h) pitches. The ball's physics have been called into question, with the ball stopping on a dime after three or less bounces. The game's camera system does not function properly and, when a ball is hit, the outfield camera follows the ball looking upwards, making it impossible for the game player to see where their fielders are. The ball can also be thrown and get stuck in the well between the stands and the field on an overthrow of a baseman and cause inside the park home runs, which would not happen within a real game (in that case a ground rule double and/or error would be scored instead). Another bug allows players to go into the stands past the wall with the ball if they enter at certain points in foul territory. Each baseman is also controlled individually, allowing for user error in certain situations where a running baseman will be called out if the baseman ahead of them remains at their last base if the player fails to advance them.

There are also gameplay issues when the player takes their turn to bat. The AI is not developed and, when the player hits a pitch, it nearly always takes the longest possible route to the ball, making runs easier to score. It also lacks the capability to throw out a runner who is returning to a base (instead of advancing) or perform a double play after catching a fly ball. Furthermore, the batter can only move vertically, not horizontally, in the batter's box.

== Technology ==
=== Graphics ===
A grand slam does not display any alternate screen from a home run.

The graphics themselves were considered to be three-dimensional given the constraints of the technology at the time. Each player's batting stance is exactly the same. The game view is always top down; when batting or pitching, it is centered above the catcher, behind the batter and with an overhead look of the pitcher. In the outfield, there is an aerial view of a portion of the field, with the team members represented by tiny sprites and an inset with red dots representing where the players are on base. Although the official colors are intact, the actual symbols on their uniforms are absent. The crowd is represented by a series of colored dots, while the dugouts are represented by plain white parallelograms.

=== Music and sound effects ===
There are a limited number of effects and, aside from brief ballpark jingles, there is no real background music present during the game. For example, the charge fanfare is played at random points and the introductory screen begins with a different baseball tune while the player is loading up and selecting his team, along with a home run fanfare. Generic sound effects include the bat cracking upon contact with the ball, the sound of the ball flying through the air during a pitch, bouncing and throwing effects, and a stream of crowd noises.

== Reception ==
Major League Baseball was featured in the first issue of Nintendo Power and compared to R.B.I. Baseball and Bases Loaded, although the magazine did not pass any judgment on which game was superior. Allgame rated it three stars out of five. The Los Angeles Times noted the game was a leading seller.
