= LJN Video Art =

1987 video game console

- Developer: LJN
- Manufacturer: LJN
- Type: Home video game console
- Generation: Third generation
- Released: WW: 1987
- Availability: 1989
- Lifespan: 1987–1989
- Discontinued: 1989
- Media: ROM cartridge
- CPU: Thomson-made EF6805 Motorola 6800-based microcontroller
- Display: NTSC television
- Graphics: 16 colors, Thomson EF9367P VDP
- Controller input: Joystick
- Power: 9V power supply
- Best-selling game: Video Art Activity Cartridge

The LJN Video Art is a home video game console marketed as educational that was developed and manufactured by LJN. It was launched in 1987 with a two-year market presence of mostly negative critical reviews but sharing retail prestige among hit toys. It was discontinued in late 1989 at a heavy price drop, as ultimately a commercial failure. It is LJN's only video game console, and nine games were produced for it.

== Gameplay ==
Core functionality is similar to basic personal computer paint programs. There are two main inputs on the system's controller—a joystick controlling a cursor to draw lines and curves, and a slider to select up to 16 colors. Turning on the system without a cartridge inserted gives a blank screen for drawing. The library is based on themed coloring books. Animations can be made by creating a series of drawings and recording a slide show to a VCR. Video Art Activity Cartridge is included, with several outline drawings that can be colored.

== Games ==
This is the Video Art game cartridge library:

- Video Art Activity Cartridge
- A Trip To The Zoo
- Disney Coloring Book
- Disney Story Book
- Looney Tunes
- Marvel Super-Heroes
- My Dream Day
- My Favorite Doll
- On the Move

== Marketing ==
Video Art was positioned against a wide range of educational toys and interactive television systems, such as View-Master Interactive Vision and VideoSmarts, and against television itself. It was sold alongside, but not directly positioned against, mainstream game consoles such as the Nintendo Entertainment System and the Master System. A patent was filed in 1986, which was granted in 1988.

In 1987, LJN spent most of its $5 million TV and print advertising budget on Gotcha! and Video Art. A TV advertisement includes a rap-style beat, saying "Watching TV, watching TV, you just keep searching for something to see. But then my mom, she got smart! She got me Video Art!"

== Reception ==
In December 1987, in a year of increasing price trends on high-tech interactive toys but without a single breakaway hit product, Toys R Us reported that the Video Art at about US$100 (equivalent to about $283 in 2025) was among its "hot toys" for Christmas, alongside the NES and talking dolls such as Cabbage Patch Kids and Julie. The Philadelphia Daily News said likewise, also including LJN's own Gotcha! paintball game.

The console was mostly panned by critics. On December 2, 1987 USA Today negatively reviewed a list of toys that "deserve to be dumped", calling Video Art "A costly color Etch-a-Sketch for your TV set that's much harder to work and not much fun. The results don't look nearly as lush and well-defined as those shown on the TV ads." On December 6, 1987, Newsday reviewed a variety of educational and artistic electronic toys, saying of Video Art that "The toy's most innovative feature is its animation potential. You can make cartoons by recording your drawings one at a time on your VCR, then playing them back." Roger Ebert, in the Siskel & Ebert Holiday Video Gift Guide for 1987, remarked that "this is a very hard toy or program. I tried to use it [the day before the show was taped] and even if you get good at it, the results look crummy. The joystick is a crude instrument to draw with [...] and there is no way that any kid is ever going to draw a picture that looks even half as good as the one on the box." In 1989, Catherine Cella of the Entertainment News Service reviewed the Video Art, saying that "the slightest touch sends the cursor all over the screen, making even the simplest drawing impossible" and found the included Video Art Activity Cartridge to be capable of only "video scribbling". She said the Video Art was one of the less successful interactive video machines compared to View-Master Interactive Vision and VideoSmarts. James Rolfe of The Angry Video Game Nerd also panned it critically (as with his other reviews on LJN games,) calling the console "not fun at all" and "a disaster [that] no human being should ever have the misfortune of playing."
