= WWF Superstars 2 =

1992 video game

- North American cover art featuring Hulk Hogan, The Mountie, The Undertaker and "Macho Man" Randy Savage
- Developer: Sculptured Software
- Publisher: Acclaim Entertainment (Note: Released under the LJN brand name.)
- Programmer: John L. Guymon Jr.
- Artist: Les Pardew
- Composer: Paul Webb
- Platform: Game Boy
- Release: NA: August 1992; JP: May 21, 1993
- Genre: (Sports) (professional wrestling)
- Modes: Single-player, multiplayer

WWF Superstars 2 is a video game based on the World Wrestling Federation (WWF), released in 1992 for the Game Boy by Acclaim Entertainment. It is the sequel to WWF Superstars and the second WWF game for the Game Boy system. The game is similar to WWF WrestleMania: Steel Cage Challenge for the Nintendo Entertainment System, although it runs much faster.

The game features six wrestlers: Hulk Hogan, "Macho Man" Randy Savage, The Undertaker, Sid Justice, Jake "The Snake" Roberts, and The Mountie.

== Gameplay ==
WWF Superstars 2 features a more limited moveset than its predecessor. All wrestlers share the same moveset with no signature moves. Moves are limited to strikes (punching and kicking), grapples (headbutt, suplex, and bodyslam), ground attacks (stomp and elbow drop), Irish whip moves (clothesline and dropkick), and an aerial attack (flying elbow drop). Players can press the Select button once per match to regain strength.

Modes of play include one-on-one (standard and cage match variations), tag team, and tournament, where the player chooses a wrestler and must defeat the other five to win the WWF World Heavyweight Championship.

== Reception ==
In North America, the game sold 160,272 units and grossed $4,808,160.

== See also ==
- List of licensed wrestling video games
- List of fighting games
