= Terminator 2 (8-bit video game) =

1992 video game

Terminator 2: Judgment Day
- European NES box art
- Developers: Software Creations; Arc Developments (Sega versions)
- Publishers: LJN (NES); Flying Edge (other versions)
- Programmer: Stephen Ruddy
- Artist: Anthony Anderson
- Composer: Geoff Follin
- Series: Terminator
- Platforms: NES, Game Gear, Master System
- Release: NES: NA/UK: February 1992; Master System: UK: November 1993; Game Gear: NA: December 1993
- Genre: Action
- Mode: Single-player

Terminator 2: Judgment Day is an action game released for several 8-bit consoles, including the Nintendo Entertainment System (NES) and Sega's Game Gear and Master System. It is based on the 1991 film of the same name. The NES version was developed by Software Creations and published by LJN in February 1992. The Sega versions were published in late 1993 by Flying Edge.

== Gameplay ==
Terminator 2: Judgment Day is a side-scrolling action game with a T-800 Terminator as the player character. The NES version includes five levels based on the film. The first level is set at a truck stop, where the player must beat up truckers and acquire a motorcycle and gun. The second level is played from a diagonal overhead perspective, as the T-800 flees on motorcycle from a semi-truck, driven by the T-1000. Driving through a flood channel, the player must avoid debris while simultaneously using the gun to shoot at the oncoming truck, keeping it back a safe distance.

The player then searches for Sarah Connor in a mental hospital, encountering staff members and the T-1000. The player loses energy if they kill any hospital employees, and instead must crouch down and shoot them in the leg, disabling them. The player then travels to Cyberdyne Systems to plant explosives and destroy the facility. A final battle ensues between the two Terminators in a steel mill. The Sega versions omit the motorcycle level.

== Development and release ==
LJN acquired the rights to a Terminator 2 video game after reading the film's script. The company said that the film license offered an array of gameplay possibilities and lasting popularity. The game was developed by Software Creations and published by LJN for the NES. LJN also published a version for the Game Boy. The company believed that players who owned an NES were also the same people who would own a Game Boy. Therefore, LJN chose to make the NES version a completely different game, offering players a variety.

The NES version was released in February 1992 in North America and the United Kingdom. Flying Edge published the Sega versions. The Master System version was released in the UK in November 1993, followed by the US release of the Game Gear version a month later.

== Reception ==
Reception

Review scores
Publication	Score
AllGame	NES: 2.5/5
Computer and Video Games	NES: 84%
Nintendo Power	NES: 3.1/5; 3.3/5; 2.9/5; 3/5
Total!	NES: 74%
Video Games (DE)	NES: 59%
VideoGames & Computer Entertainment	SGG: 7/10
Mean Machines	NES: 72%
Sega Magazin	40%
Sega Master Force	52/100
Sega Power	SMS: 42% SGG: 44%
Sega Pro	SMD: 35% SGG: 20%

The NES version was praised for its graphics and sound. GamePro wrote that it "packs good looks and a great challenge". Steve Jarratt of Total! felt that the gameplay had a lack of originality. Paul Rand of Computer and Video Games found it "reasonably enjoyable" despite offering "nothing new or innovative". Reviewers for Mean Machines considered it inferior to the Game Boy version of Terminator 2, concluding, "Possibly the greatest film licence ever is wasted on a fun, but ultimately shallow game".

The gameplay in the Sega versions was also criticized for a lack of originality. Rob Pegley of Sega Power stated that the "vast majority of the gameplay is coma-inducing". Sega Pro found it to be outdated and "tedious in the extreme", and criticized the lack of features, such as skill levels or multiplayer. The magazine concluded that it was a "dull, uninteresting game that lacks vitality and new ideas. [...] Even on the MS this is poor". Sega Master Force felt that the game was released too late after the film.

The Sega versions were also criticized for their graphics and sound. Sega Pro noted the presence of flickering characters in both versions. GamePro, in its review of the Game Gear version, wrote that the graphics "are small and poorly defined. You can't see any detail in the characters, and very few in the backgrounds. Telling the Cyberdyne labs apart from the hospital is pretty hard". VideoGames, reviewing the same version, wrote, "The characters are a bit small, and there isn't that much variety throughout it. The music will also get on your nerves after a while". Sega Pro criticized the "scratchy" music and stated that the sound "consists of white-noise every time you hit someone".

In a later review for AllGame, Christopher Michael Baker offered praise to the NES version for its graphics and music, although he criticized the difficulty.
