= WWF Superstars (handheld video game) =

1991 video game

- European cover art featuring "Macho Man" Randy Savage, Hulk Hogan and Ultimate Warrior
- Developer: Rare
- Publisher: LJN
- Artist: Kevin Bayliss
- Writer: Paul Machacek
- Composer: David Wise
- Platform: Game Boy
- Release: NA: April 1991; EU: 1991
- Genres: Wrestling
- Modes: Single-player, multiplayer

WWF Superstars is a wrestling video game for the Game Boy handheld console developed by Rare and published by LJN, based on the WWF's syndicated television show of the same name. This game was the first WWF game for the Game Boy system.

The game was succeeded by WWF Superstars 2, which was released in 1992 by LJN. A unique engine was built from the ground up; the developers never attempted to emulate the gaming engine found in the more advanced WWF games.

== Overview ==
WWF Superstars was developed by Rare and published by LJN. It was released in Europe and North America in 1991, which was followed by its Japanese release on February 14, 1992.

Before every match, wrestlers cut promos on their opponent. Following the match, Vince McMahon comments on the action. The wrestlers each have two comments. One is a generic taunt, while the second is specific to the opponent.

The game features five wrestlers: Hulk Hogan, "Macho Man" Randy Savage, The Ultimate Warrior, "The Million Dollar Man" Ted DiBiase, and Mr. Perfect.

Nintendo Power reviewed WWF Superstars in their April 1991 issue and rated it a score of 2.9 out of 5.

== Gameplay ==
All wrestlers have the same moves, with the exception of individualized strike attacks. The moveset consists of attack moves (punch and kick), a bodyslam, grappling moves that can only be performed when the players pick an opponent up from the mat (piledriver, suplex, headlock with punches), ground attack moves (elbow or knee drop), Irish whip moves (clothesline and dropkick), and flying turnbuckle moves (elbow or knee drop). Players can also wrestle outside the ring by throwing their opponent over the ropes or by performing a dropkick through the ropes. Throwing the opponent out of the ring can be done once per match and causes considerable damage.

Once a player selects a wrestler, they must defeat the other four in a series of matches to be named WWF World Heavyweight Champion. On completion, the player gets a portrait picture of their chosen superstar.

== Reception ==
In North America, the game sold 265,392 units and grossed $7,961,760.
