= A Nightmare on Elm Street (video game) =

1990 video game

- Cover art
- Developer: Rare
- Publisher: LJN
- Programmer: Steve Patrick
- Composer: David Wise
- Platform: Nintendo Entertainment System
- Release: NA: October 1990
- Genre: Platforming
- Modes: Single-player, multiplayer

A Nightmare on Elm Street is a video game released on the Nintendo Entertainment System in 1990 based on Wes Craven's slasher film of the same name. The game was developed by Rare and published by LJN.

== Gameplay ==
The player takes on the role of an ordinary teenager. Additional teenagers can be controlled by up to three other players with the use of the NES Four Score. The objective is to scour the vicinity of Elm Street, collect the bones of the supernatural serial killer Freddy Krueger and dispose of them in the local high school's furnace.

A Nightmare on Elm Street is a horizontal side-scrolling beat 'em up. The game's environment is inhabited by hostile characters, such as zombies, cats, dogs, skeletons, bats, rats, spiders and minotaurs, that will attack the player character. Being attacked a certain number of times will cause the player to lose a life. Because the game takes place around midnight, certain areas are initially locked off from the player and require a key to be collected for later access. Within the individual buildings, the player must collect the bones scattered throughout the level before being able to leave. When all the bones are collected, a boss battle with Freddy will commence. Defeating Freddy will both allow the player to exit the area and earn the player a key that allows access to a new area.

A game mechanic unique to the title is the "Sleep Meter". The meter indicates how close the player character is to falling asleep. If even one player's meter is fully drained, all will be transported to an alternate version of the environment referred to as the "Dream World", where the player is more vulnerable to attacks from Freddy. The Sleep Meter decreases automatically, but does so at a slower pace when the player character stays in motion. The Sleep Meter can be increased by collecting cups of coffee scattered throughout the levels. When in the Dream World, the player character can be returned to the default version of the level by collecting a boombox. Collecting certain icons grants the player characters special powers while they are within the Dream World, namely the ability to throw shurikens, javelins or magic projectiles.

== Development ==
In April 1989, LJN revealed to Game Players that development of an NES game based on A Nightmare on Elm Street began, an initial release date planned sometime in the fall. According to the game magazine Nintendo Power, the original concept of this game varied greatly from what was eventually released. In the original game concept, the players would control Freddy Krueger and should kill the teenagers who were attempting to gather his scattered bones in order to rebury them. The final LJN release coincided with Monarch Software's Commodore 64 also based on the franchise.

== Reception ==
Reception

Review scores
| Publication | Score |
|---|---|
| Electronic Gaming Monthly | 6/10; 4/10; 4/10; 5/10 |
| Nintendo Power | 3/5; 3/5; 2.6/5; 2.6/5 |
| VideoGames & Computer Entertainment | 7/10 |

All of A Nightmare on Elm Street's contemporaneous reviews were published before its October 1990 release. The earliest of these was an April 1990 "ProView" by Brother Buzz for GamePro who called it a "ripping good time". Chris Bieniek of VideoGames & Computer Entertainment called A Nightmare on Elm Street unusually good for a film-based game, praising its "smooth, quick, and responsive" controls, and strong presentation, highlighting the "movielike wavering of the screen" that occurs when entering the dream world. Writing in retrospect in 2010, an IGN journalist was mixed towards the game, praising its sleep meter element but also feeling it was a "low-rent Castlevania with a great but bizarrely weak super-villain." In 2022, the game was number 77 on a readers-voted list of best Rare games by Time Extension in 2024.

=== Legacy ===
In 2013, NECA released a GameStop exclusive figure of the Freddy Krueger with colors based on his appearance in the game, similar to their Jason Voorhees figure with colors based on LJN's 1988 Friday the 13th game.

== See also ==
- Friday the 13th (1989 video game)
