= S. D. Jones =

American professional wrestler

Personal information
- Born: Conrad Efraim; March 30, 1945 Antigua, British Leeward Islands
- Died: October 26, 2008 (aged 63) Antigua, Antigua and Barbuda
- Cause of death: Stroke

Professional wrestling career
- Ring name(s): Roosevelt Jones; S. D. Jones; Special Delivery Jones
- Billed height: 6 ft 1 in (185 cm)
- Billed weight: 275 lb (125 kg)
- Billed from: "Antigua in the West Indies"; Philadelphia, Pennsylvania
- Trained by: Johnny Rodz, Killer Kowalski
- Debut: 1971
- Retired: 1995

Conrad Efraim (March 30, 1945 – October 26, 2008) was an Antiguan professional wrestler best known by his ring name Special Delivery Jones or S. D. Jones (sometimes referred to as S. D. "Special Delivery" Jones) during his time in the World Wrestling Federation (WWF, now WWE) from 1974 to 1990. He also wrestled in Jim Crockett Promotions and the National Wrestling Alliance (NWA), and he won the NWA Americas Tag Team Championship three times.

== Professional wrestling career ==
Before becoming a wrestler, Efraim worked at a telephone company. He also took part in boxing and lifting weights. While there, he began training under Johnny Rodz and Killer Kowalski in the sport of professional wrestling. Upon completion of his training, he quit his job and began working for NWA Mid-Atlantic under the name "Roosevelt Jones" in a tag team with his partner and kayfabe cousin Rufus R. Jones. While there, they had a memorable feud with the Anderson family (Ole and Gene).

On January 17, 1975, after leaving the Mid-Atlantic area for California, Jones won his first of three tag team titles, combining with Porkchop Cash to take the NWA Americas Tag Team Championship from the Hollywood Blonds (Buddy Roberts and Jerry Brown). The following month, Jones and Cash dropped the titles back to the Blonds. Jones won the title again in 1977, teaming with Tom Jones to defeat Black Gordman and Goliath. Gordman and Goliath regained the championship, but SD and Tom Jones won the belts back from them on November 18, 1977.

S. D. Jones had his first match in the WWWF on April 25, 1974, facing Nikolai Volkoff in Trenton, New Jersey. Jones would continue to wrestle in the WWF (WWWF) as a mid-card babyface who would give the heels a hard time but end up losing. He did, however, win quite a few matches on smaller cards against lower card or fellow mid carders like Ron Shaw and Johnny Rodz. Jones was often featured in tag team matches partnered with Tony Atlas, and the two challenged Mr. Fuji and Mr. Saito for the WWF Tag Team Championship several times in 1981. On one occasion, the two ended up as the final men in a battle royal and flipped a coin to decide the winner, as seen on the WWF Coliseum Video 'Best of the WWF Volume 4' and 'Grand Slams' video cassettes.

S. D. helped put over Greg Valentine at a 1979 TV taping when Valentine locked in his figure-four leglock and refused to let go, leading to Jones doing a stretcher job and subsequently appearing in Madison Square Garden with his leg in a cast. He was also the tag team partner of André the Giant on November 13, 1984, when André's hair was cut by Ken Patera and Big John Studd. At the inaugural WrestleMania in 1985 he famously lost to King Kong Bundy in an official match time of nine seconds, although the actual time from bell to pinfall was seventeen seconds. In any case, it would stand as the quickest match in WrestleMania history until Kane defeated Chavo Guerrero in 11 seconds to win the ECW Championship at WrestleMania 24.

Jones was a workhorse for the WWF as he wrestled 240 matches per year during his career and twice wrestled over 300 matches in a single year with (302) in 1978 and (305) in 1984. Despite mainly being used as a preliminary talent in the 1980s WWF, Jones garnered further recognition when LJN created two action figures of him for their Wrestling Superstars toy line. One was with a yellow shirt with blue palm trees and the other was with a red shirt. He also appeared in the WWF's music video for Land of a Thousand Dances. Jones last match was in New York City at Madison Square Garden on October 19, 1990, losing by pinfall against Iron Mike Sharpe.

After WWF, he wrestled for Herb Abrams's Universal Wrestling Federation and Universal Wrestling Superstars in New York City. He retired from the sport in 1995. In 2006, S. D. Jones appeared for the WWE inducting Tony Atlas into the WWE Hall of Fame. S. D. Jones was added to the WWE Hall Of Fame on April 7, 2019, as a legacy inductee.

== Personal life and death ==
After retiring from wrestling, Jones lost a considerable amount of weight and took a job at the New York Daily News. He died in Antigua on October 26, 2008, following a stroke suffered two days earlier.

Following his death, his wife recalled "On Wednesday, he was laughing and singing and all of that… He went to feed the dogs, and when he came back, he called my name. He said, ‘Kay.’ He showed me his fingers, and the next thing I know, his body went limp. We went to the doctor's, and he had three-quarters of his brain bleeding, covered with blood."

== Championships and accomplishments ==
- East Coast Pro Wrestling
  - ECPW Hall of Fame (Class of 2019)
- NWA Hollywood Wrestling
  - NWA Americas Tag Team Championship (3 times) – with Porkchop Cash (1 time) and Tom Jones (2 times)
- Universal Superstars of America
  - USA Tag Team Championship (1 time) - with Tony Atlas
- WWE
  - WWE Hall of Fame (Class of 2019)
