= Wrestling Superstars =

Action figure series

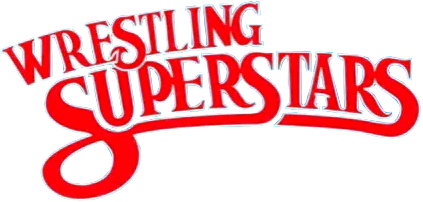
- Type: Action figures
- Invented by: Richard Derwald
- Company: LJN
- Country: United States
- Availability: 1984–89
- Materials: Plastic
- Features: WWF wrestlers

Wrestling Superstars were the first action figures based on the wrestlers of the WWF. Wrestling action figures were the brainchild of Richard Derwald of Buffalo, New York who sold the idea to LJN in the summer of 1984. (Video in references). They were made by the toy and video game company LJN from 1984 to 1989. The figures were made of solid rubber and paint and were very accurate in appearance to their real life counterparts.

LJN closed its toy division in 1989, canceling the Wrestling Superstars line with it. The last six figures produced were only distributed by Grand Toys of Canada making them rarer than most of the other figures.

The line was restarted in 2021 by Jazwares, which produced an action figure of Cody Rhodes with LJN branding for All Elite Wrestling. Wrestling Superstars figures for AEW wrestlers Darby Allin and CM Punk have also been announced for 2022.

In 2025, the 8" line was revived in a retro toyline by Mattel titled LJN WWE Superstars. Exclusive to Target, the figures resemble the design of the original line down to the card art and pack-in poster, and include wrestlers from the LJN days as well as newer wrestling stars. The first wave includes Hulk Hogan, Dusty Rhodes, John Cena, and Logan Paul.

== 8" Series ==
The 8" series was the main line in the Wrestling Superstars collection. Each superstar came with a biography card on the packaging and a poster inside. There are 64 figures with unique molds, plus an additional 6 major repaints that change the figures look significantly. The major repaints are Hulk Hogan in a white shirt (red shirt), Tito Santana in Strike Force attire (purple trunks), S. D. Jones in a Hawaiian shirt (red shirt), André the Giant (short hair version) with black strap attire (blue trunks), Corporal Kirchner with a painted beard, and the Referee in a white shirt (blue shirt). There are also numerous minor repaints and several minor mold changes.

=== Series 1 ===
Advertisement for the action figure series

- André the Giant (Note: with long hair)
- Big John Studd
- Hillbilly Jim (Note: with hat)
- Hulk Hogan (Note: with black title belt)
- The Iron Sheik (Note: orange or yellow designs on tights)
- Jimmy "Superfly" Snuka
- Junkyard Dog (Note: with dog collar and (black, silver or red chains))
- Nikolai Volkoff
- "Rowdy" Roddy Piper (Note: with kilt (red or brown boots))

=== Series 2 ===
- André the Giant (Note: with short hair)
- Brutus Beefcake
- George "The Animal" Steele
- Greg "The Hammer" Valentine (Note: light hair, dark blonde hair, or no belly button)
- King Kong Bundy
- "Mr. Wonderful" Paul Orndorff

=== Series 3 ===
- Bobby "The Brain" Heenan (Note: with or without scrolls designs on shoulders of shirt)
- Bruno Sammartino
- Captain Lou Albano (Note: red or white lapels of Albano's blazer on T-shirt print)
- "Classy" Freddie Blassie (Note: with cane)
- Corporal Kirchner (Note: clean shaved face, stubble, or full beard)
- Davey Boy Smith
- Magnificent Muraco (Note: large or small text on t-shirt)
- Dynamite Kid
- Jesse "The Body" Ventura (Note: blonde hair/brown mustache/neon pink tights, blonde hair/brown mustache/dull pink tights, blonde hair/blonde mustache/neon pink tights, brown hair/brown mustache/neon pink tights)
- Jimmy Hart (Note: hearts on megaphone or no hearts on megaphone)
- Mr. Fuji
- "Macho Man" Randy Savage (Note: pink trunks, purple trunks, or no stars on trunks)
- "Mean" Gene Okerlund (Note: WWF logo on microphone, or no WWF logo on microphone)
- Ricky "The Dragon" Steamboat
- S. D. Jones (Note: red or tropical shirt)
- Terry Funk with branding iron & hat (Note: teeth showing or no teeth showing)
- Tito Santana (Note: purple trunks)

=== Series 4 ===
- "Adorable" Adrian Adonis
- Billy Jack Haynes
- Bret "The Hitman" Hart (Note: pink or purple tights)
- B. Brian Blair (Note: tan skin color, non-tan skin color, or no stripes on trunks)
- Cowboy Bob Orton
- Elizabeth (Note: with gold or purple skirt)
- King Harley Race with crown
- Hercules Hernandez (Note: upper or lower molded Titan Sports Inc trademark on back)
- Jake "The Snake" Roberts (Note: with snake Damien (glossy tights or matte tights)
- Jumping Jim Brunzell (Note: tan skin color or non-tan skin color)
- Jim "The Anvil" Neidhart (Note: pink or purple tights)
- Ken Patera
- Kamala
- Koko B. Ware (Note: with parrot Frankie)
- Outback Jack
- Ted Arcidi
- Vince McMahon

=== Series 5 ===
- Ax
- Bam Bam Bigelow
- Hacksaw Jim Duggan (Note: with 2x4)
- Honky Tonk Man (Note: with acoustic guitar)
- Hulk Hogan (Note: with title belt (white or red shirt))
- One Man Gang
- Referee (Note: blue or white shirt)
- "Luscious" Johnny Valiant
- Rick Martel
- Slick
- Ted DiBiase
- Tito Santana (Note: White Strike Force trunks)

=== Series 6 ===
- André the Giant (Note: black single strap singlet)
- Big Boss Man (Note: with nightstick)
- Haku
- Rick Rude
- Ultimate Warrior
- Warlord

=== Re-released ===
(on series 6 black cards)

- Hulk Hogan
- Big John Studd
- Brutus "The Barber" Beefcake
- Bam Bam Bigelow
- Honky Tonk Man (Note: with guitar)
- Jake "The Snake" Roberts (Note: with snake Damien)
- Demolition Ax
- Randy "Macho Man" Savage
- Miss Elizabeth (Note: with gold or purple skirt)
- Bret "Hitman" Hart
- Ted DiBiase
- Hacksaw Jim Duggan
- Adrian Adonis

=== Tag Team Box Sets ===
(each set came packed with a poster, and 2 brown tag team champion belts. Strike Force, however, came with black belts)

- The British Bulldogs
- Brutus Beefcake and Greg "The Hammer" Valentine
- Hart Foundation
- Hulk Hogan and Hillbilly Jim (Note: with Hillbilly Jim's hat)
- The Iron Sheik and Nikolai Volkoff (Note: with Nikolai Volkoff's hat)
- The Killer Bees
- Strike Force

=== Value Packs ===
(included 2 posters) (usually Series 1-3 overstock)

- Two random figures

=== Accessories ===
- Sling 'Em-Fling 'Em Wrestling Ring
- Cage Match Accessory

== Bendies ==
The Bendies line was fashioned after the original 8" series using the same paint scheme and pose as their taller version. The difference was that they were much smaller and had metal wire inside allowing the toys to bend. There were 18 figures with unique molds plus variations. There are a total of four figures which include wrestlers who were produced both with and without laces on their boots: Hulk Hogan, Paul Orndorff, Roddy Piper and Iron Sheik. Hulk Hogan has a third variant which has blue knee pads instead of red, and is .25" taller than the rest of the line. There is a variant of the Cage Match Challenge ring set that came with red posts/turnbuckles and tan colored cage, instead of the standard blue color posts/turnbuckles and grey colored cage.

=== Single Figures ===
- André the Giant
- Big John Studd
- Bobby Heenan
- Brutus Beefcake
- Captain Lou Albano
- Corporal Kirchner
- George "The Animal" Steele
- Hillbilly Jim
- Hulk Hogan (red knee pads with laces on boots, red knee pads without laces on boots, or blue knee-pad versions)
- The Iron Sheik (with laces on boots, or without laces on boots)
- Jesse "The Body" Ventura
- Junkyard Dog
- King Kong Bundy
- "Mr. Wonderful" Paul Orndorff (with laces on boots, or without laces on boots)
- Nikolai Volkoff
- "Macho Man" Randy Savage
- Ricky "The Dragon" Steamboat
- "Rowdy" Roddy Piper (with laces on red boots, or without laces on brown boots)

=== Tag Team 2 Packs ===
- Hulk Hogan & Junkyard Dog
- The Iron Sheik & Nikolai Volkoff
- George Steele & Captain Lou Albano
- King Kong Bundy & Big John Studd
- Randy Savage & Jesse Ventura
- Ricky Steamboat & Corporal Kirchner

=== Accessories ===
- Cage Match Challenge. Includes Hulk Hogan with blue knee pads and one other figure. (with blue or red posts/turnbuckles, and grey or tan cage)

== Thumb Wrestlers ==
The Thumb Wrestler line consisted of only 12 figures which were sold in two-packs. Jake Roberts and King Kong Bundy were produced in very small quantities in comparison to the other 10 figures. There is one variant which is the Roddy Piper thumb wrestler figure with either red or brown boots.

- Hulk Hogan
- Big John Studd
- The Iron Sheik
- King Kong Bundy
- Nikolai Volkoff
- "Macho Man" Randy Savage
- Jake "The Snake" Roberts
- "Rowdy" Roddy Piper (brown or red boots)
- Hillbilly Jim
- Junkyard Dog
- Ricky "The Dragon" Steamboat
- "Mr. Wonderful" Paul Orndorff

=== Available in these two-packs ===
- Hulk Hogan vs. Big John Studd
- Hulk Hogan vs. The Iron Sheik
- Hulk Hogan vs. King Kong Bundy
- Hulk Hogan vs. Nikolai Volkoff
- Hulk Hogan vs. "Macho Man" Randy Savage
- Hulk Hogan vs. Jake "The Snake" Roberts
- Hulk Hogan vs. "Rowdy" Roddy Piper
- Hillbilly Jim vs. The Iron Sheik
- Hillbilly Jim vs. Big John Studd
- Hillbilly Jim vs. Nikolai Volkoff
- Hillbilly Jim vs. "Macho Man" Randy Savage
- Hillbilly Jim vs. "Rowdy" Roddy Piper
- Junkyard Dog vs. The Iron Sheik
- Junkyard Dog vs. Big John Studd
- Junkyard Dog vs. "Rowdy" Roddy Piper
- Junkyard Dog vs. Nikolai Volkoff
- Ricky "The Dragon" Steamboat vs. "Macho Man" Randy Savage
- Ricky "The Dragon" Steamboat vs. "Rowdy" Roddy Piper
- Ricky "The Dragon" Steamboat vs. Nikolai Volkoff
- Ricky "The Dragon" Steamboat vs. Jake "The Snake" Roberts
- "Mr. Wonderful" Paul Orndorff vs. Big John Studd
- "Mr. Wonderful" Paul Orndorff vs. King Kong Bundy
- "Mr. Wonderful" Paul Orndorff vs. "Rowdy" Roddy Piper

== 16" Series ==
- Hulk Hogan (with title belt & shirt)
- "Rowdy" Roddy Piper (with kilt, belt & shirt)

== Stretch Wrestlers ==
The Stretch Wrestlers line from 1987 consisted of only 8 figures and were not produced in very high numbers, thus commanding high prices on the secondary collector market for figures that are in good condition. The main gimmick to these figures was that they could be stretched and retain their elongated state for a short time before shrinking back to its original shape.

These figures were originally based on the same technology as the Stretch Armstrong toy that Kenner produced in 1976. Each WWF Stretch figure was packaged in an attractive colorful box which contained a plastic tray and clear plastic cover for the tray. The figures have a thin layer of latex rubber skin which is extremely condition sensitive. Because of the fragile nature of these figures, the latex rubber skin is prone to cracking and the gel-filled inner contents is prone to leaking.

The only variant in this series is King Kong Bundy, which had red boots instead of black boots.

- George "The Animal" Steele
- Hulk Hogan
- Junkyard Dog
- King Kong Bundy (with black or red boots)
- "Mr. Wonderful" Paul Orndorff
- "Macho Man" Randy Savage
- Ricky "The Dragon" Steamboat
- "Rowdy" Roddy Piper

== Prototypes, rarities, and errors ==
Various different prototypes were photographed in various LJN advertising and packaging, such as, Adrian Adonis with scarves, Rick Steamboat with red trunks, Tito Santana with an entirely different mold, Fred Blassie with a painted cane and glittered jacket, Hillbilly Jim with a black undershirt, Jimmy Hart with a pink megaphone, Kamala with an alternate paint job, Koko B. Ware with light blue tights, Haku as 'King Haku', and Rick Rude with green tights among others.

As for the Bendies Series, there are documented issues of the LJN Toy Catalog for retailers in the year 1987 that show prototype bendies for Tito Santana, Magnificent Muraco, Bruno Sammartino, and Terry Funk. There have never been any documented showings of anyone possessing these figures.

Photographed prototype versions of George Steele with painted on chest hair, as well as a Roddy Piper figure with a panther shirt are rumored to have actually been produced.

The Bendies series figure cards featured a Mail-In promotion for a brass die-cast metal belt buckle that was a replica of the WWF Championship Belt. The requirements for the "Free" mail-in offer were four proofs of purchase (Wrestling Superstars points on the card backs) and $1.00 to cover postage and handling. The "WWF Championship Belt Buckle mail-in offer" expired on March 31, 1987.

LJN also produced a child size "WrestleMania Championship Belt" in 1987. The belt featured an action lever which could change the frontal belt image into a new image featuring Hulk Hogan holding the belt. The side plates that were attached on the straps of the belt featured WWF champions of the past and included Buddy Rogers, Bruno Sammartino, Bob Backlund, The Iron Sheik, Ivan Koloff, Pedro Morales, and Superstar Billy Graham. The packaging for the title belt featured pictures of unproduced large size "Wrestling Superstars Muscle Grip" action figures of Hulk Hogan and Randy Savage complete with title belts.

A "Wrestling Superstars Jumbo Collectors Case" was produced in 1986; however, this action figure case was not produced by LJN and was produced by Tara Toys. The case is officially licensed and features artwork from the Hulk Hogan's Rock 'N' Wrestling cartoon from 1985.

There were also Canadian release "Value Packs" which contained a randomly assorted two-pack of figures generally taken from, but not limited to, the first three series of the line.

The final series of figures that were scheduled but never produced included: Bad News Brown, Brother Love, Bushwhacker Luke, Bushwhacker Butch, Demolition Smash and The Barbarian. Photographs of the wrestlers appeared on the backs of the black Series 6 Superstars '89 cards and they were mentioned in various ads by a company called The Wrestling Ring contained in 1989 issues of Pro Wrestling Illustrated and their various publications, but photographs of the actual figures have never been seen. Miss Elizabeth was also pictured on the back of the black cards as an available re-release. To date, there has not been any verifiable proof that it was released as one has yet to turn up in circulation.

An 8" Sgt. Slaughter figure was made by LJN. Slaughter had a contract dispute with the WWF over merchandising, and left the company. The figure was never released to stores and was instead purchased by Hasbro. Hasbro then made the 8" Sarge figure available as a mail order tie-in with their G.I. Joe action figure line. Slaughter was shipped in a plastic bag which had a chemical reaction with the unpainted portions of the rubber. The result was green spots that plague most Slaughter figures. The first design of the figure was a re-molded body of Jimmy Snuka.

There were two prominent misspellings on the red stickers affixed to the figures' packaging. Vince McMahon's name was spelled "Vince McMann" and Bret Hart's was spelled "Brett Hart", though Hart's wasn't really an error as "Brett" was the spelling used on every episode of Championship Wrestling.

LJN released several different Hulkamania exercise sets for boys in 1985, and was advertised as a complete exercise program for boys. Despite being linked to Hogan, TV commercials featured rival wrestler Paul Orndorff. The five exercise sets released were:

=== Deluxe Hulkamania Workout Set ===
- 40-minute exercise cassette tape, titled "Workout Set 40 Minute Audio Program"
- Two pre-weighted 3 lb (1.4 kg) blue dumbbells
- Professional jump rope with swivel handles
- Large (facsimile) autographed Hulk Hogan poster with workout instructions, titled "Workout Chart"
- One super hand grip squeezer
- One "Hulkster" headband
- Two wrist sweat bands

=== Deluxe Hulkamania Barbell Workout Set ===
- 40-minute exercise cassette tape, titled "Barbell Set 40 Minute Audio Program"
- Total of 17 lbs (7.7 kg) lifting weight; Two 5 lb (2.3 kg) blue weights; Two 2.5 lb (1.1 kg) blue weights
- Two barbell clamps
- One 2 lb (0.9 kg) chrome plated bar
- Large (facsimile) autographed Hulk Hogan poster with workout instructions, titled "Barbell Set"
- One "Hulkster" headband

=== Hulkamania Dumbbell Workout Set ===
- 40-minute exercise cassette tape, titled "Dumbell Set 40 Minute Audio Program"
- Two pre-weighted 3 lb (1.4 kg) blue dumbbells
- One "Hulkster" headband
- Large (facsimile) autographed Hulk Hogan poster with workout instructions, titled "Workout Chart"

=== Hulkamania Swivel Handle Jumprope Set ===
- Professional jump rope with swivel handles
- One "Hulkster" headband

=== Hulkamania Power Hand Grip Set ===
- Two super hand grip squeezers
- One "Hulkster" headband

A Hulkamania "Workout Kit" was released in 1987, that featured the 1985 LJN "Hulkster" headband, a 2 fl oz bottle of shampoo and a bar of soap with a sticker of Hulk Hogan affixed on top of the soap; however, this set was not produced and distributed by LJN. It was produced and distributed by the G.T. Fulford Co., Ltd in Canada.

The original "Sling 'Em-Fling 'Em Wrestling Ring" was recalled on November 4, 1991, due to 4 cases of children seriously injuring themselves falling on the corner ring posts. In one of those cases, a plastic ring post penetrated the child's body causing serious injury. The posts were made of hard plastic and would not budge much, if at all when fallen or stepped on. 1.4 million rings were sold. The rights to the ring were purchased by the toy company Jakks Pacific and it was re-released as The Monster Ring in the '90s. Protective caps were attached to the posts for added safety.
