= Terminator 2 (16-bit video game) =

1993 video game

Terminator 2: Judgment Day
- European Mega Drive cover art
- Developer: Bits Studios
- Publishers: Flying Edge (Genesis); LJN (SNES)
- Designers: Foo Katan; Gary Sheinwald; Alex Martin
- Programmers: Steve Howard; Steve Clark
- Artists: Laurence McDonald; Carl Cropley; Alan Barton
- Composer: Shahid Ahmad
- Series: Terminator
- Platforms: Super NES, Sega Genesis
- Release: Super NES: NA: September 1993; UK: 1993; Genesis: NA: December 1993; UK: 1993
- Genre: Action
- Mode: Single-player

Terminator 2: Judgment Day is a 1993 action game developed by Bits Studios for two 16-bit game consoles: the Sega Genesis and the Super Nintendo Entertainment System (SNES). It was published by Acclaim Entertainment subsidiary companies: Flying Edge for the Genesis, and LJN for the SNES. It is based on the 1991 film of the same name, and features side-scrolling and driving levels. Players act as the T-800 Terminator completing a variety of objectives at several levels with settings from the film before battling the T-1000 in a steel mill. Reviews from gaming magazines were generally negative. Although its dedication to the source material was positively covered, the gameplay, collision detection, and character sprites were frequent aspects of condemnation.

== Gameplay ==
Terminator 2: Judgment Day is a side-scrolling action game in which the player takes control of a T-800 Terminator. Levels are based on eight locations from the film, including a truck stop, John Connor's house, a shopping mall, a mental hospital, a weapons cache, the house of Miles Dyson, and Cyberdyne Systems. The final level is a battle between the T-800 and the T-1000 in a steel mill.

HUD messages appear on-screen to inform the player of mission objectives, mimicking the T-800's point of view in the films. Objectives, which include locating specified items or people, must be cleared before proceeding to the next level. On some levels, the player must lead John to safety. One objective throughout the game is to collect items that have materialized from the future. The player can use a variety of weapons as the game progresses.

Driving levels, viewed from an overhead perspective, appear in between the side-scrolling levels. A motorcycle is used for most of the driving portions, although other vehicles are used later on, including a police car. Roadblocks are a frequent obstacle for the player, who must also avoid traffic.

== Reception ==
Reception

Review scores
Publication	Score
AllGame	1/5 (Genesis); 1.5/5 (SNES)
Mean Machines Sega	15/100 (Genesis)
Player One	20% (Genesis)
Total!	31% (SNES)
VideoGames & Computer Entertainment	4/10 (Genesis)
Electronic Games	86% (SNES)
SNES Force	46/100 (SNES)
Mega	22% (Genesis)
Mega Action	89% (Genesis)
MegaTech	12% (Genesis)
SegaForce	26/100 (Genesis)
Sega Power	27% (Genesis)
Sega Zone	33% (Genesis)

Terminator 2 received generally negative reviews. SNES Force considered it a "massive disappointment", while Jonathan Davies of Sega Zone called it a "film licence game of the very worst, most despicable sort". MegaTech wrote, "You'll be hard pressed to find a more inept game than this. It's absolute trash and Acclaim should be ashamed that they're actually releasing it". Mean Machines Sega called the game an "outright disaster for Acclaim who ought to bin this title before anyone notices it exists". Total!, in a February 1994 review, claimed it the worst licensed SNES game so far.

Reviewers were critical of the graphics, especially the small character sprites. VideoGames opined that the game "looks like it was programmed on a Commodore 64". MegaTech called it "a ridiculous-looking romp which brings new meaning to the word appalling". GamePro considered the sprites easily identifiable despite their small size, and wrote, "All the character movements are well detailed and deftly animated." Total! panned the T800 sprite as unlike its source material and too "big" and "clunky", noting a glitch where it became invisible once a bullet passed. Mockery was made towards the Terminator's jumping animation by Paul Mellerick of Mega and Mean Machines Sega, describing it as similar to a "constipated bunny"; Mean Machines Sega also joked that he "hits like a baby". The backgrounds were criticized by Total! as "drab" and GamePro as "mostly squarish objects with little variation".

The gameplay was criticized as well, including its poor collision detection. Total! and SNES Force considered the gameplay tedious, and Sega Power found it too basic. However, the variety of gameplay styles received some praise. The controls were criticized, especially in the driving portions, which MegaTech called "horrendously laughable". GamePro considered the driving segments a "major drawback", writing, "The confusing controls seriously detract from an otherwise excellent cartridge". Conversely, Mellerick considered these segments to be the best part of the game, and also praised the need to search through buildings for items. However, MegaTech stated that these searches are "slow at best and frustrating at worst". In a positive review, Steve Atherton of Mega Action called the game "well thought out and good fun", concluding it to be "All in all a great conversion" of the film.

The game received some praise for closely following the film's plot. Some critics found the on-screen text difficult to read, and others were critical of the sound and music, although Atherton found the latter to be atmospheric. GamePro criticized the SNES version for using the same music through much of the game.

In a later review for AllGame, Brett Alan Weiss called the Genesis version "a truly wretched gaming experience" with "almost no redeeming value". He criticized the controls, and stated that the music "comes up far short" and that sound effects "are strangely absent" for most of the game. He considered the SNES version "superior in every way", writing, "While still a lousy game, it has better graphics, music, and sound effects".
