= Terminator 2 (Game Boy video game) =

1991 video game

Terminator 2: Judgment Day
- Developer: Bits Studios
- Publisher: LJN
- Producer: Foo Katan
- Designer: Foo Katan
- Programmer: Jason Austin
- Artists: Mark Jones; Martin Wheeler
- Composer: David Whittaker
- Series: Terminator
- Platform: Game Boy
- Release: 1991
- Genre: Action-adventure
- Mode: Single-player

Terminator 2: Judgment Day is a 1991 action-adventure game developed by Bits Studios and published by LJN. It is based on the 1991 film of the same name, and was released for the Game Boy. It was praised for its graphics, gameplay, and music.

== Gameplay ==
Terminator 2 is an action-adventure game played across six levels. The player has unlimited ammunition for most of the game. In the first two levels, the player controls John Connor, who is leading a human resistance against Skynet and its machines in 2029. The player travels through Skynet territory and battles numerous machines. The third level is a puzzle game in which John has limited time to reprogram a T-800 Terminator, by rearranging circuitry in the back of its head.

The T-800 is sent to 1990s Los Angeles to protect young John from a T-1000, who has been sent by Skynet to kill him. The player controls the T-800 for subsequent levels. In the fourth level, John and the T-800 ride a motorcycle through a drainage canal to evade the T-1000, who is pursuing them in a semi-truck. The player uses a shotgun to keep the truck back, and must also avoid debris in the canal.

Later, the player infiltrates Cyberdyne Systems to retrieve technology from a previous T-800, while encountering SWAT guards throughout the facility. In the final level, the player faces off against the T-1000 in a steel mill, using either guns or hand-to-hand combat. John's mother, Sarah Connor, appears in between levels to explain the story.

== Development and release ==
Terminator 2 was published by LJN, which acquired the film rights from production company Carolco. The game was developed by Bits Studios, based in the U.K.; it was the first game the company developed entirely in-house, having previously focused on Game Boy and NES ports of games developed by other companies. Bits consulted with the film company, which stated repeatedly that Sarah Connor's "bangs" were too small in the game. Because of regional differences, the development team misunderstood the term and continually made Sarah's breasts larger, before finding out that the film company had been referring to her hair. Arnold Schwarzenegger portrayed the T-800 in the film, although images of his face could not be used in the game for legal reasons.

The game was released in the U.S. in November 1991, followed by a U.K. release shortly thereafter.

== Reception ==
Reception

Review scores
Publication	Score
Joystick	92%
Total!	80%
Zero	90/100
GO!	92%
Mean Machines	90%
N-Force	83%
Play Time	65%

Terminator 2 was praised for its graphics. Andy Dyer of Total! wrote, "There's a genuine scary feel to the cold, oppresive look of the Skynet buildings, the desolate canal, and that forbidding steel mill". GamePro, though praising the graphics, stated that the action scenes were "a tad small even for the Game Boy".

The gameplay received praise, particularly for its variety. GamePro concluded that it was "basic, good old-fashioned Game Boy fun". Dyer praised the game's pacing, writing that the levels end "just before you get bored or irritated". He further wrote that the game "takes the best bits from the movie" and "cuts out all the boring bits where things weren't getting blown up", concluding, "I only wish all film tie-ins could be as good as this!" N-Force found it to be a "great" film-based game, while Mean Machines considered it one of the best Game Boy games to date. The game's music was also praised.
