= Back to the Future Part II & III =

1990 video game

- Box art of Back to the Future Part II & III
- Developer: Beam Software
- Publisher: LJN
- Designer: Paul Mitchell
- Programmers: Graeme Scott; Trevor Nuridin
- Composers: Tania Smith (Music); Gavan Anderson (Sound Effects)
- Platform: Nintendo Entertainment System
- Release: September 1990
- Genres: Platform; Action-adventure; Puzzle
- Mode: Single-player

Back to the Future Part II & III is a 1990 video game for the Nintendo Entertainment System based on the second and third films in the Back to the Future trilogy. The game was produced by Beam Software and published by Acclaim Entertainment under their LJN label.

== Plot ==
=== Part II ===
When Doc brings Marty to the year 2015 to prevent his future son from committing a crime, old Biff takes the Gray's Sports Almanac and travels back to 1955 and gives the book to his younger self. Over the next three decades, young Biff uses the information to win money on the outcome of each sporting event he bets on, making him the richest and most powerful man in the world by 1985. To ensure that nobody else gets their hands on the almanac, Biff travels through time and collects various items and puts them behind locked doors in three different periods. This action has caused a disruption in time, and now the space-time continuum is falling apart. With Hill Valley in ruins, Marty must now travel to the three periods, then find and return all the items back to their initial places in order to retrieve the almanac and destroy it.

=== Part III ===
After Marty returns all the items to their rightful places and burns the almanac, he then receives a letter from Doc via a courier that was written in 1875 (1885 in the film). According to the old letter, Doc has become stranded in the past and must be rescued or else the future will be threatened. Marty must now go back in time in order to rescue Doc with the old but repaired DeLorean. Before they can go back to 1985, Marty must find and return ten more items to their rightful location.

== Gameplay ==
1985A Street Level from part II

=== Street level ===
The player controls Marty and attempts to defeat enemies by jumping on or throwing projectiles at them. The player must also collect fuel for the time machine and junk food for extra lives as progress is made through each timeline.

Scattered and hidden throughout each timeline are Object Rooms (containing objects which must later be returned to other locations) and alleyways used to navigate street to street within the timeline. Some alleyways appear in all three timelines while others only appear in one or two. At other points, the player must use the DeLorean to navigate large chasms that appear in different timelines.

=== Object rooms ===
As the player progresses through the level, they obtain keys by killing certain enemies. These keys are used to unlock the various object rooms throughout each level. Within each object room, the player must obtain one of the items ostensibly scattered by Biff. The rooms appear as locked doors in Part II and caves or various buildings in Part III.

To retrieve the items Biff scattered, the player must participate in a minigame within the object room which involves collecting a certain number of stop watches in 60 seconds while avoiding enemies and obstacles such as cacti, quicksand and falling pellets.

=== Puzzle rooms ===
Puzzle rooms are hidden throughout each level and found in various drainage pipes and manholes. Each puzzle room contains the scrambled name of the object that belongs there. The player must unscramble the word and select the proper item from their inventory. Correctly choosing the item that belongs within the room reveals one section of a picture puzzle. However, if the player chooses the wrong item, it is removed from their inventory and returned to the object room in which it was previously located. This forces the player to complete the challenge within that room to regain the object.

In Part III, puzzle rooms are located under rocks that the player must break open by jumping on them.

=== Time travel ===
After finding the remote control to summon the DeLorean, players can time travel between 1955, 1985 and 2015. However, adequate fuel must be collected before being able to time travel in the DeLorean.

Additionally, each time the player time travels, a clone of Marty is created in that year which will result in instant death upon contact.

Some platforms are out of reach in certain areas which need to be accessed to progress through the level. The player can plant an acorn in 1955 and then revisit that same location in 1985 or 2015 where a full-grown tree appears. This allows the player to access the previously unreachable space.

== Reception ==
Reception

Review scores
Publication	Score
AllGame	2.5/5
Nintendo Power	3.22/5 (Note: Nintendo Power awarded Back to the Future Part II & III 3.5/5 for graphics and sound, 3.4/5 for play control, and two 3/5 ratings for challenge and theme/fun.)
Game Freaks 365	5/10
VideoGames & Computer Entertainment	3/10

Skyler Miller of AllGame acknowledged Back to the Future Part II & III had little to do with the source material and had nonsensical elements. It was "a decent Super Mario Bros. rip-off" with "reasonably tight" controls and "passable" graphics. GamePro, also comparing the game to Super Mario Bros., suggested its various arcade-style minigame levels makes this cart as challenging and that they provide hours of fun.

Stan Stepanic of Gamefreaks365.com made positive remarks about Back to the Future II & III in regards to its similarities with The Goonies II, but gave it a largely negative review due to the lack of a password or save feature coupled with its notorious length, although there was a code to skip to the second half of the game. Stepanic stated that it took him roughly six hours just to map it, and he spent so much time trying to finish it he actually turned it off out of boredom.
