= Town & Country Surf Designs: Wood & Water Rage =

1988 video game

- Developer: Atlus
- Publisher: LJN
- Composer: Tsukasa Masuko
- Platform: NES
- Release: NA: February 1988
- Genre: Sports
- Mode: Multiplayer

Town & Country Surf Designs: Wood & Water Rage is a skateboarding and surfing game published by LJN for the Nintendo Entertainment System in February 1988. The game shares its name with the surfboard manufacturer, Town & Country Surf Designs, and features the company's mascot characters, known as "Da Boys".

== Gameplay ==
Town & Country Surf Designs: Wood & Water Rage is divided into three events. "Street Skate Session", "Big Wave Encounter", and "Wood and Water Rage". In Street Skate Session, players choose either Joe Cool or Tiki Man and attempt to complete a timed linear obstacle course on a skateboard, evading obstacles and scoring points. The player can control their skater's speed and steer them with the D-pad. The B Button gains speed if tapped, while the A button jumps. If Left on the D-Pad is held, the skater will grip the back end of their skateboard, gradually slowing them down. If the A button is pressed while in this state, the skater will perform an ollie, clearing pitfalls and other obstacles that would stop the skateboard. Performing an ollie against a railing will make the skater grind across it, while timing an ollie over a ramp will launch the skater a much longer distance. If the skater bails, the player loses a life. Completing a course adds bonus points to the player's score based on the amount of time and number of lives remaining. The game continues until the player runs out of time.

Big Wave Encounter is the surfing event, played with either Kool Kat or Thrilla Gorilla. Unlike Street Skate Session, the goal is to survive surfing on a large wave rather than compete against a clock. Players move their surfer with the D-pad and jump at the top of the wave with the B button, steering away from hazards that enter the wave while picking up bananas for extra points. Going too deep into the wave, suffering a collision with an obstacle, or leaving the wave entirely results in the loss of a life. Eventually, the wave will approach a pier which the player must surf past to end the round. Completing a round adds a 1,000 point bonus, as well as 100 points per remaining life.

Wood and Water Rage is a mixed skateboarding and surfing event, alternating between skateboarding and surfing with every Round. Players pick a team of two characters to play in each respective sport: either Joe Cool paired with Thrilla Gorilla, or Tiki Man paired with Kool Kat. Each sport plays identically to Street Skate Session and Big Wave Encounter respectively, and the players' scores are carried over between the two sports.

== Sequel ==
A follow-up game was released in North America in March 1992 entitled Town & Country II: Thrilla's Surfari. While it shared a common title and characters, the gameplay diverged away from its predecessor to take on more action and platforming elements.
