= Spirit of Speed 1937 =

1999 video game

- North American Dreamcast cover art
- Developer: Broadsword Interactive
- Publishers: Hasbro Interactive (Note: Released under the MicroProse label) (PC); Acclaim Entertainment (Note: Released under the LJN label) (Dreamcast)
- Producer: Nick Court
- Designers: David Rowe; John Jones-Steele
- Programmers: Jim Finnis; John Jones-Steele
- Artists: David Rowe; Andy Nicholas
- Platforms: Microsoft Windows, Dreamcast
- Release: Windows: UK: November 19, 1999; Dreamcast: EU: June 9, 2000; NA: June 27, 2000; AU: July 28, 2000; JP: April 5, 2001
- Genre: Racing
- Mode: Single-player

Spirit of Speed 1937 is a racing game developed by Broadsword Interactive. The game was originally released in 1999 exclusively in Europe by Hasbro Interactive, who released the game under the MicroProse brand name. In 2000, the game was ported to the Dreamcast, and was published by Acclaim Entertainment under the LJN banner, the final game published with this label, five years after LJN was shut down by Acclaim. This version saw a North American release, and was released there on June 27, 2000. Spirit of Speed 1937 takes place in 1937, when motorsport was in its infancy.

== Gameplay ==
Spirit of Speed 1937 features 15 classic vehicles, including the first twin-supercharged single-seat racer, the Alfa Romeo P3. Also featured are the twin V8 Alfa Romeo Bimotore designed by Scuderia Ferrari, the Alfa Romeo 12C, the Auto Union Type C which was designed by Ferdinand Porsche, and the Auto Union Type D.

Other cars include the Bugatti Type 35, Bugatti Type 59, Prince Bira's ERA "Remus", Mercedes-Benz W125, Mercedes-Benz W154, Duesenberg, Miller, and the 24-litre Napier-Railton. Players race around nine legendary courses located in Mellaha (Libya), AVUS (Germany), Trenton Speedway (U.S.), Roosevelt Raceway (U.S.), Montlhéry (France), Pau (France), Donington (England), Brooklands (England), and Monza (Italy).

Spirit of Speed 1937's modes of play are Single Race, Championship Season, and Scenario. Single Race allows players to select a car and course to race on. Championship Season is where users take part in a series of races in an attempt to win the title. Scenario is a mode that sets up a historic racing moment for the player to experience. Each mode is broken into three separate difficulties but none of them include a two-player feature. Along with the standard controller, the game also supports arcade sticks and steering wheels.

== Reception ==
Reception

Aggregate score
Aggregator	Score	
Aggregator	Dreamcast	PC
GameRankings	39%	N/A

Review scores
Publication	Score	
Publication	Dreamcast	PC
Famitsu	25/40	N/A
GameSpot	1.9/10	N/A
GameSpy	1/10	N/A
GameStar	N/A	44%
IGN	2.2/10	N/A
Jeuxvideo.com	7/20	16/20
Joypad	2/10	N/A

The Dreamcast version received unfavorable reviews according to the review aggregation website GameRankings. IGN's Jeremy Dunham called it "the poorest excuse for a Dreamcast game I have ever laid eyes on", harshly criticizing nearly every aspect of the game, including the load times, course designs, control, and graphics. GameSpot's Frank Provo criticized the sound effects and the visuals of the game. In Japan, however, where the game was ported and published by Acclaim Japan on April 5, 2001, Famitsu gave it a score of 25 out of 40.

GameSpot named it the Worst Video Game of 2000 – the first year the award was given for console games.

Conversely, DC Swirl gave the game 3 out of 5 swirls, commending the accurate portrayal of auto racing of the period, and approving of the relatively low price point at which the game was retailed. HappyPuppy gave a rating of 6.5/10 and a mixed review criticizing the gameplay but complimenting the graphics. Argentine magazine Next Level gave the game 70%, approving the low price and the authentic representation of themes of the era. Spain-based magazine Super Juegos gave a better score of 72. GF3K.com gave a far better score of 7.8 out of 10, praising the controls, sound, and the game's accuracy in portraying vintage racing cars.
