= Town & Country Club (Saint Paul, Minnesota) =

Golf club in St. Paul, Minnesota

- Interactive map of Town & Country Club
- 44.949°N 93.201°W

Club information
- Location: St. Paul, Minnesota
- Established: 1888
- Type: Private Club
- Tota holes: 18
- Tournaments: various amateur events
- Designed by: E. J. Frost; Robert Foulis (redesign)
- Par: 72
- Length: 6,400 yards (5,900 m)
- Course rating: 71.9
- Slope rating: 137

Town & Country Club is a golf club located in St. Paul, Minnesota which was founded in 1888. Designed by George McCree and E. J. Frost, and later redesigned by Robert Foulis. Foulis, an early professional at Town & Country Club who was recommended to the membership by C.B. MacDonald.

== Club history ==
As the first "country club" in Minnesota, Town & Country Club was founded as a social organization inspired by the clubs in Saint Paul that were formed as a nucleus of the annual Winter Carnival. A residence on Lake Como was used as the first clubhouse in 1887. The Club moved in 1890 to its present home at the Marshall Avenue Bridge on the Saint Paul side of the Mississippi River. Today, this “country club” is in the heart of the Twin Cities metropolitan area, but in 1890, it was in the far reaches of Saint Paul.

The original Town & Country Club, a Saint Paul landmark, was designed by state capitol architect, Cass Gilbert, and built in the early 1890s for $25,000.

The first round of golf in Minnesota was played at the Town & Country Club of Saint Paul in 1893. Golf began here as an afterthought. George McCree, a transplanted Scot, had migrated to Minnesota from Canada and was familiar with the game of golf. An early member recalled, “I took McCree out to the Club with my lawn mower in the back of my roadster to help lay out the course. Using an old driver and a twenty-five cent gutta percha ball, after a couple shots, McCree marked a spot with a stake - 'This is the first hole,' he said. In this fashion, the first five holes were laid out."

In 1895, E. J. Frost, a well-known amateur out of Chicago, was hired to lay out Town & Country Club’s first nine holes with the help of Charles B. Macdonald and Henry James Whigham. In 1897, $2,000.00 was budgeted to lay out the new course. On June 9, 1898, the new nine holes were opened for play. Also at this time, Robert Foulis, the first golf pro and expert maker of clubs, was acquired from St. Andrew’s Golf Club. The first greens keeper was also engaged at this time.

Town & Country Club's golf course is the second oldest golf course in the United States still being played on its original land, behind only Shinnecock Hills Golf Club in New York.

Town & Country Club is one of the first 25 member clubs of the United States Golf Association and is a founding member of the Western Golf Association.

== Scorecard ==
Town & Country Club
Tee	Rating/Slope	1	2	3	4	5	6	7	8	9	Out	10	11	12	13	14	15	16	17	18	In	Total
Par	---	4	3	3	5	4	4	4	4	4	35	4	3	5	4	3	5	5	5	3	37	72
Back	71.9/137	324	110	163	490	354	468	354	366	414	3026	377	186	533	283	230	552	521	522	170	3355	6400

== Tournaments ==
The Town & Country Club has hosted the following events:

National

- Walker Cup (1940*)
- U.S. Women's Amateur (1951)
- Women's Western Amateur (1937)

State

- Minnesota Amateur (1903, 1907, 1910, 1916, 1929, 1941, 1960, 1982)
- Minnesota Senior Amateur (1961, 1971, 1980, 1993)
- Minnesota Junior Boys' Championship (2001)
- MGA Players' Championship (1987)
- Minnesota Mid-Amateur (2012)

*Was awarded but not played due to World War II
