= Town & Country II: Thrilla's Surfari =

1992 video game

- Cover art
- Developer: Sculptured Software
- Publisher: LJN
- Composer: Paul Webb
- Platform: Nintendo Entertainment System
- Release: NA: March 1992
- Genre: Action game
- Mode: Single-player

T&C Surf Designs II: Thrilla's Surfari is a sequel to Town & Country Surf Designs: Wood & Water Rage for the Nintendo Entertainment System (NES) video game system.

== Gameplay ==
Gameplay of Thrilla's Surfari

The game features Thrilla Gorilla, the gorilla mascot of Town & Country Surf Designs, on a quest to save his girlfriend Barbi Bikini from an African witch doctor named Wazula, as you find out in the opening scenes. The game features settings such as jungles, deserts, waterfalls, rivers, and submerged caverns. Thrilla rides a skateboard through the jungle and desert levels, a surfboard through the river and waterfall levels, and a shark in the submerged cavern levels.

Gameplay involves steering Thrilla around obstacles, over pits and past enemies while collecting coconuts, bananas and other powerups such as the handstand, which grants temporary invulnerability to all manners of danger but pitfalls. Enemies include elephants, giraffes, giant spiders, carnivorous plants, snakes, electric eels, and many others.

Reception

Review score
Publication	Score
GamePro	4/5
