= LJN =

American toy and video game publishing company

LJN Toys Ltd.
- Type: Private (1967–85); Subsidiary (1985–94)
- Industry: Entertainment
- Founded: 1967
- Founder: Jack Friedman
- Defunct: 1994; 32 years ago
- Fate: Dissolved
- Headquarters: New York City, U.S.
- Products: Video games, action figures
- Brands: Wrestling Superstars (1984–89)
- Parent: MCA Inc. (1985–90); Acclaim Entertainment (1990–95)

LJN Toys Ltd. was an American toy company and video game publisher founded by Jack Friedman in 1967. MCA Inc. acquired the company in 1985, and sold to Acclaim Entertainment in 1990.

The toy division of the company was closed by Acclaim and a majority of its employees were fired as the company was shifted towards video game publishing. It was closed in 1994, but its label was used once more in 2000.

== History ==
=== Early history (1967–1985) ===
Jack Friedman founded LJN in 1967 using funds from his employer Norman J. Lewis Associates (from which the company name "LJN" is derived, being a reversal of Lewis' initials) after seeing the sales figures of Mattel and Milton Bradley Company increase. Friedman later founded THQ and Jakks Pacific after leaving LJN. LJN shifted money used for television advertising to instead purchase licenses to make toys based on television shows. The first toyline by LJN based on a television show was for Emergency! The highest amount the company paid for a license by 1982 was $250,000.

LJN purchased the license to make toys based on E.T. the Extra-Terrestrial for $25,000 due to other companies declining the option, including Kenner Products and Ideal Toy Company, and sold over $16–25 million worth of merchandise without the need of an advertising campaign. A doll based on Brooke Shields was released with a $2 million advertising budget and made over $12 million in 1982. LJN's revenue rose from $5 million in 1971 to $70 million in 1982 due to the E.T. and Brooke Shields toys.

In 1984 LJN became the toy licensee of the World Wrestling Federation. The Wrestling Superstars line, which featured action figures based on WWF's roster of wrestlers, was produced from 1984 to 1989. LJN competed with Mattel in the toy market. The company produced the ThunderCats toyline in competition with Mattel's Masters of the Universe.

=== MCA ownership (1985–1990) ===
On March 26, 1985, MCA Inc. announced that it would purchase 63% of LJN's shares for $39.8 million and proposed to buy the remainder of the stock for $14.26 for each share which would increase the total value of the deal to almost $65 million. However, the company failed to make a net income from 1986 to 1989, and MCA had to take a $53 million after-tax charge due to the expenses of the company before selling it to Acclaim Entertainment for $30 million in April 1990. LJN had a revenue of $110,510,000 and a net loss of $37.3 million in 1987. MCA received 1.2 million shares in Acclaim as part of the LJN deal. 181,000 shares were returned as part of a price adjustment agreement and the remainder was sold for around $4.3 million in 1991.

LJN entered the video game industry by publishing games based on movies and television shows developed by companies including Atlus, Beam Software, and Rare for the Nintendo Entertainment System in 1987. The company released the LJN Video Art in 1987. At least 75% of the company's $70 million in sales in 1990 came from video game sales on the Nintendo Entertainment System and Game Boy.

The company released a paint gun line named Gotcha! with a license from the film Gotcha!, but this line were criticized by consumer protection groups due to the danger it posed to eyes. The toyline was financially unsuccessful, and MCA had to take a $35 million after-tax charge due to its failure and the expenses of the Coleco. The company was also criticized by police officers and Americans for Democratic Action for its Entertech line of toy water guns due to how realistic they looked; LJN changed the design of the toys after three people in the United States from ages 13 to 19 were killed as a result of police officers thinking they had actual guns, and multiple cities and states banned the sale of realistic toy guns.

Lawrence J. Kirk Jr. fired half of the company's employees as part of a cost-cutting plan during his seven months as president from 1989 to 1990. LJN attempted to acquire Buddy L during his tenure, but MCA ended the negotiations before announcing that it was selling LJN.

=== Acclaim Entertainment ownership (1990–2000) ===
Acclaim closed LJN's toy division and shifted the company's focus to video game publishing. It fired 45 of the company's 70 employees and moved its headquarters from Lyndhurst, New Jersey to Oyster Bay, New York, the same place as Acclaim's headquarters.

Lawrence Kanaga filed a lawsuit on behalf of Clark Thiemann on January 31, 1990, against LJN, Nintendo, and Major League Baseball claiming that the game Major League Baseball was falsely advertised to Thiemann stating that it would allow him to simulate being a baseball team manager and Kanaga stating that the game was advertised as having all of the players, but instead only had their uniform numbers. In 1991, the U.S. Consumer Product Safety Commission recalled LJN's Sling 'Em-Fling 'Em wrestling ring toys based on the World Wrestling Federation, which sold 1.4 million products from 1985 to 1989, due to multiple children between six and ten being injured by the toys.

Acclaim closed LJN in 1994, but reused the company's name for the release of Spirit of Speed 1937 in 2000.

== Products ==
=== The Blinkins ===
The Blinkins are a series of characters created for LJN. Baby Blinkins dolls were marketed in the United States in the mid-1980s following the popularity of the Cabbage Patch Kids.

The story of The Blinkins television specials broadcast in 1986 follows the adventures of a group of five anthropomorphic female fireflies who protect the beauty of the forest. The main protagonists are Blink, Shady, Flashy, Flick, and Twinkle, who defend the forest from villains such as Mr. Slime, an alligator. The series was produced by MCA Television in association with TMS Entertainment.

These episodes tell stories about how the Blinkins face various threats to their home in the forest and help other characters in need:

- "The Blinkins" – April 1986
- "The Blinkins and the Bear" – September 1986
- "The Blinkins and the Blizzard" – December 1986

The specials were syndicated and released on videotape by MCA Home Video as The Blinkins: The Bear and the Blizzard.

=== Video game software ===
Year	Title	Platform(s)	Developer(s)	Ref.
1987	Gotcha! The Sport!	NES	Atlus	
1987	Jaws	NES	Atlus	
1987	The Karate Kid	NES	Atlus	
1988	Major League Baseball	NES	Atlus	
1988	Town & Country Surf Designs: Wood & Water Rage	NES	Atlus	
1989	Back to the Future	NES	Beam Software	
1989	Friday the 13th	NES	Atlus	
1989	NFL	NES	Atlus	
1989	The Uncanny X-Men	NES		
1989	Who Framed Roger Rabbit	NES	Rare	
1990	The Amazing Spider-Man	Game Boy	Rare	
1990	Back to the Future Part II & III	NES	Beam Software	
1990	A Nightmare on Elm Street	NES	Rare	
1990	Pictionary	NES	Software Creations	
1990	The Punisher	NES	Beam Software	
1990	WWF WrestleMania Challenge	NES	Rare	
1991	Roger Clemens' MVP Baseball	Super NES, NES, Game Boy	Sculptured Software	
1991	Wolverine	NES	Software Creations	
1991	Beetlejuice	NES	Rare	
1991	WWF Superstars	Game Boy	Rare	
1992	Beetlejuice	Game Boy	Rare	
1992	NBA All-Star Challenge	Super NES	Beam Software	
1992	Spider-Man and the X-Men in Arcade's Revenge	Super NES	Bits Studios	
1992	Spider-Man and Venom: Maximum Carnage	Super NES	Software Creations	
1992	Terminator 2	NES	Software Creations	
1992	Town & Country II: Thrilla's Surfari	NES	Sculptured Software	
1992	WWF Superstars 2	Game Boy	Sculptured Software	
1992	WWF Super WrestleMania	Super NES	Sculptured Software	
1992	WWF WrestleMania: Steel Cage Challenge	NES	Sculptured Software	
1993	Alien 3	Super NES, NES, Game Boy	Probe Software	
1993	Terminator 2	Super NES	Bits Studios	
1993	WWF King of the Ring	NES, Game Boy	Gray Matter; Eastridge Technology	
1993	WWF Royal Rumble	Super NES	Sculptured Software	
1994	Spider-Man and the X-Men in Arcade's Revenge	Game Boy	Unexpected Development	
1994	Spider-Man and Venom: Maximum Carnage	Super NES	Software Creations	
1994	Wolverine: Adamantium Rage	Super NES	Bits Studios	
1994	WWF Raw	Super NES, Game Boy	Sculptured Software; Realtime Associates	
2000	Spirit of Speed 1937	Dreamcast	Broadsword Interactive	
